= Timeline of Berlin =

Coordinates: 52.516667°N 13.383333°E

The following is a timeline of the history of the city of Berlin, Germany.

== Prior to 17th century ==
- 1163 – Berlin founded by Albert the Bear (approximate date).
- 1183 – Oak beam, discovered in 2008 by archaeologists, dated to 1183.
- 1200 – Saint Peter's Church built in Cölln (approximate date).
- 1220 – Population: 2,400.
- 1230
  - St. Nicholas' Church built (approximate date).
  - Tabor Church (Berlin-Hohenschönhausen) built (approximate date).
- 1237 – 28 October: First documentation of Cölln.
- 1240 – Marienfelde church built (approximate date).
- 1244 – 29 April: First documentation of Berlin.
- 1250
  - Population: 1,200–2,000.
  - Jesus Church, Berlin-Kaulsdorf built (approximate date).
  - Franziskaner-Klosterkirche built (approximate date).
  - Karow (Berlin) church built (approximate date).
- 1253 – Oldest known town seal of Berlin.
- 1272 – Bakers' guild established.
- 1278 – Georgenhospital established.
- 1282 – First documentation of official papers of the Margrave of Brandenburg.
- 1292 – 3 January: St. Mary's Church in existence.
- 1300 – Heinersdorf church construction begins.
- 1307
  - 20 March: Legal union of Berlin and Cölln.
  - Population: 4,000–7,000.
- 1360 – Berlin-Cölln joins the Hanseatic League.
- 1380 – Fire.
- 1400
  - Population: 7,000–8,500.
  - 1,100 buildings.
- 1432 – Merger of Berlin and Cölln.
- 1433 – Schützengilde Berlin Korp. von 1433 (militia) formed.
- 1442 – Berlin leaves the Hanseatic League.
- 1443 – Stadtschloss (palace) construction begins.
- 1446 – 7 December: Pogrom against Jews.
- 1448 – 14 October: Unsuccessful protest against the construction of the Stadtschloss. Town privileges curtailed.
- 1450 – Population: 7,000–8,000.
- 1451 – Stadtschloss built.
- 1454 – St. Erasmus Chapel consecrated.
- 1468 – First documentation of Kammergericht.
- 1484 – 18 October: Jerusalem Church in existence.
- 1486 – 11 March: Berlin Stadtschloss becomes permanent seat of Brandenburg Electors.
- 1510 – 100 Jews accused of desecrating hosts. 38 burned, the rest banished and stripped of their possessions.
- 1530 – Tiergarten hunting park built.
- 1539 – 1 November: Protestant Reformation.
- 1540
  - Church possessions secularized.
  - Printing press in operation.
- 1542 – Kurfürstendamm avenue built.
- 1543 – Jagdschloss Grunewald hunting lodge built.
- 1558 – Köpenick Palace built.
- 1576
  - Population: 11,000–12,000.
  - Bubonic plague kills 6,000 people.
- 1594 – Spandau Citadel built.

== 17th century ==
- 1600 – Population: 9,000.
- 1618 – Population: 12,000.
- 1631 – Population: 8,100.
- 1636 – Joachimsthalsches Gymnasium (school) relocates to Berlin.
- 1647 – Unter den Linden boulevard laid out.
- 1642 – Population: 7,500.
- 1648 – Population: 6,000.
- 1650 – Berlin Fortress construction begins.
- 1653 – Alte Kommandantur built.
- 1661 – Library of the Elector opened.
- 1664 – Schönhausen Palace built.
- 1669 – Kronprinzenpalais built.
- 1671 – 21 May: 50 Jewish families from Austria settled in Berlin.
- 1674 – Dorotheenstadt receives town privileges.
- 1677 – Köpenick Palace rebuilt and enlarged.
- 1678 – Dorotheen Church built.
- 1680 – Population: 10,000.
- 1685
  - 29 June: Börse Berlin stock exchange founded.
  - 6,000 Huguenots settle in Berlin.
  - Wooden Neustädtische Brücke built.
  - Population: 17,500.
- 1688
  - Gendarmenmarkt laid out.
  - Jungfern Bridge built.
  - Leipziger Straße (street) laid out.
  - Population: 18,000–20,000.
- 1690 – Hohenschönhausen Castle built.
- 1691 – Friedrichstadt (Berlin) founded.
- 1693 – Jagdschloss Glienicke completed.
- 1695
  - 21 July: Sebastiankirche opened.
  - Friedrichsfelde Palace built.
  - Lange-brucke (bridge) built.
- 1696 – Academy of Arts founded.

== 18th century ==
- 1700
  - 11 July: Electoral Brandenburg Society of Sciences founded.
  - Population: 28,500.
- 1701 – 18 January: Berlin becomes capital of the Kingdom of Prussia.
- 1702 – Friedrichs-Waisenhaus Rummelsburg orphanage and infirmary established.
- 1703
  - 8 July: Parochialkirche opened.
  - Wooden Friedrichs Bridge built.
- 1704 – Vossische Zeitung founded.
- 1705
  - Charlottenburg founded.
  - French Cathedral built in Friedrichstadt.
- 1706 – Zeughaus built.
- 1708
  - 9 April: Neue Kirche completed in Friedrichstadt.
  - Frankfurter Allee built.
- 1709
  - Berlin merges with the cities of Cölln, Dorotheenstadt, Friedrichstadt, and Friedrichswerder to create the capital and royal residence of Berlin.
  - Population: 55,196.
- 1710 – Charité hospital established.
- 1712 – Population: 61,000.
- 1713
  - 18 June: Spandauische Kirche inaugurated.
  - Charlottenburg Palace built.
  - Nicolaische Buchhandlung (bookseller) in business.
- 1715 – City hosts Treaty of Berlin (1715).
- 1716 – 12 July: Luisenkirche inaugurated.
- 1717 – Compulsory schooling established.
- 1720 – Späth nursery founded.
- 1721 – Population: 65,300.
- 1722 – Garrison Church built.
- 1726 – Population: 72,000.
- 1730 – Population: 72,387.
- 1732
  - 13 December: Treaty of the Three Black Eagles signed by Prussia.
  - 1,200 Bohemians settle in Berlin to escape religious persecution.
  - Population: 77,973.
  - Crown Prince's Palace remodelled.
- 1733
  - Prinzessinnenpalais built.
  - Population: 79,017.
- 1734
  - Potsdam Gate constructed.
  - Pariser Platz laid out.
  - Das Rondell laid out.
- 1735 – Population: 86,000.
- 1737
  - City fortifications replaced by the Berlin Customs Wall
  - Opera Palace constructed.
  - Zietenplatz built.
- 1738 – Ordenspalais built.
- 1739
  - 13 August: Holy Trinity Church built.
  - Prinz-Albrecht-Palais built.
- 1740 – Population: 90,000.

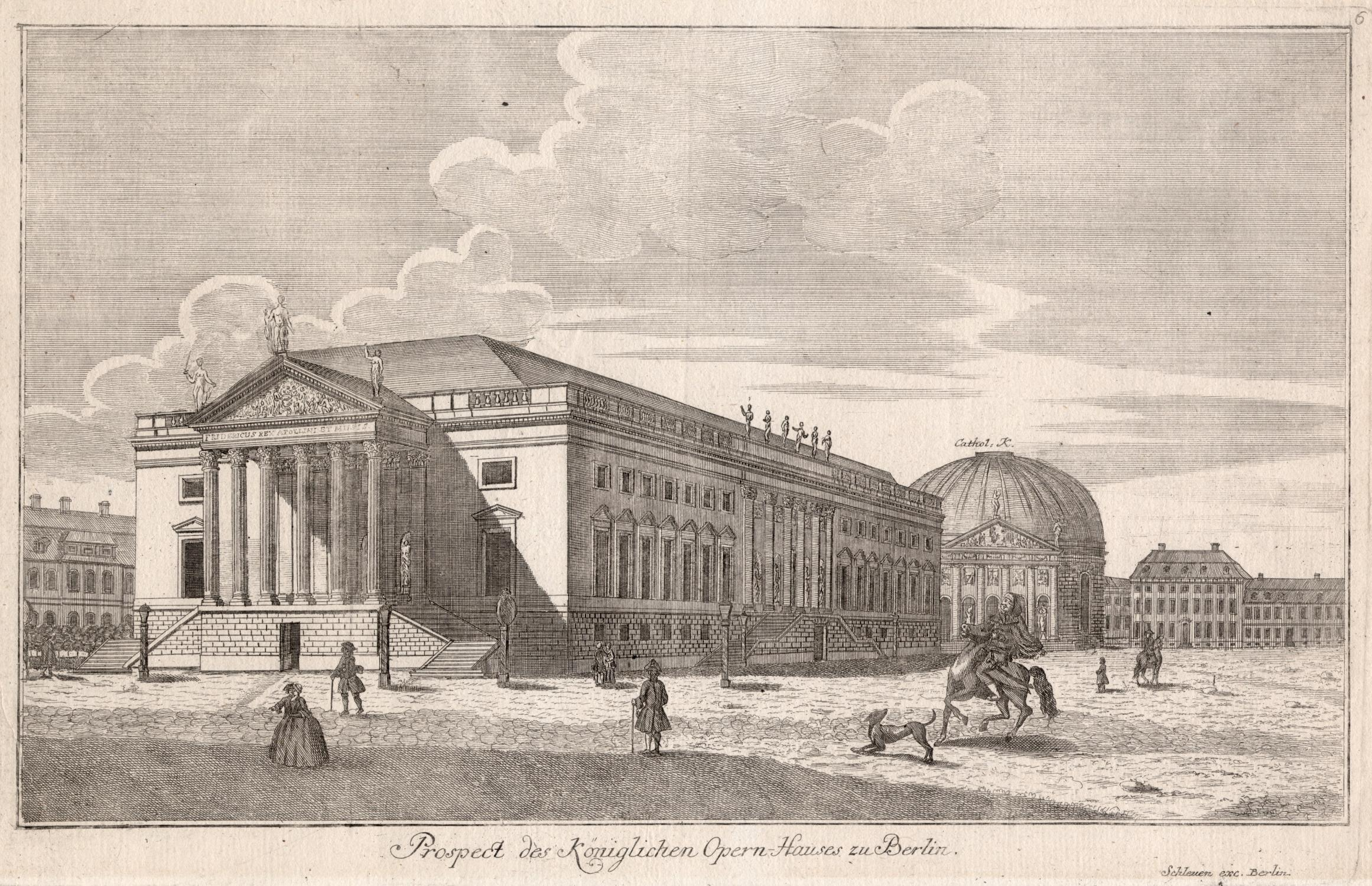
Berlin State Opera in the 1740s

- 1742
  - 28 July: City hosts signing of the Treaty of Berlin (1742).
  - 7 December: Berlin State Opera house inaugurated.
- 1743 – Opernplatz (square) laid out.
- 1746 – Population: 97,000.
- 1747 – Population: 107,224.
- 1748
  - Berlin Cathedral built.
  - Population: 107,635.
- 1749 – Population: 110,933.
- 1750 – Population: 113,289.
- 1751
  - 22 September: Ackerstraße building begins.
  - Population: 116,483.
- 1752 – Population: 119,224.
- 1753
  - Palais am Festungsgraben built.
  - Luisenstädtische Kirche rebuilt.
  - Population: 122,897.
- 1754 – Population: 125,385.
- 1755 – Population: 126,661.
- 1756 – Population: 99,224.
- 1757
  - 16 October: 1757 raid on Berlin. Austrian general András Hadik raids Berlin.
  - Population: 94,219.
- 1758 – Population: 92,356.
- 1759 – Population: 94,433.
- 1760
  - 9–12 October: Raid on Berlin. City taken by Russian and Austrian forces.
  - Population: 95,245.
- 1761 – Population: 98,238.
- 1762 – Population: 98,090.
- 1763
  - 19 September: Royal Porcelain Factory, Berlin founded in Charlottenburg.
  - Population: 119,219.
- 1764
  - Döbbelinsches Theater opened, the first permanent German-language theater in Berlin.
  - Population: 122,667.
- 1765
  - Bank established.
  - Population: 125,139.
- 1766
  - Ephraim Palace built in Nikolaiviertel.
  - Population: 125,878.
- 1767 – Population: 127,140.
- 1768 – Population: 130,359.
- 1769
  - Brick Friedrichs Bridge built.
  - Population: 132,365.
- 1770
  - Bergakademie Berlin established.
  - Population: 133,520.
- 1771 – Population: 133,639.
- 1772 – Population: 131,126.
- 1773
  - 1 November: St. Hedwig's Church consecrated.
  - Population: 132,204.
- 1774
  - Französisches Komödienhaus (French Comedy House) established.
  - Population: 134,414.
- 1775 – Population: 136,137.
- 1776 – Population: 137,468.
- 1777 – Population: 140,719.
- 1778 – Population: 124,963.
- 1779 – Population: 138,225.

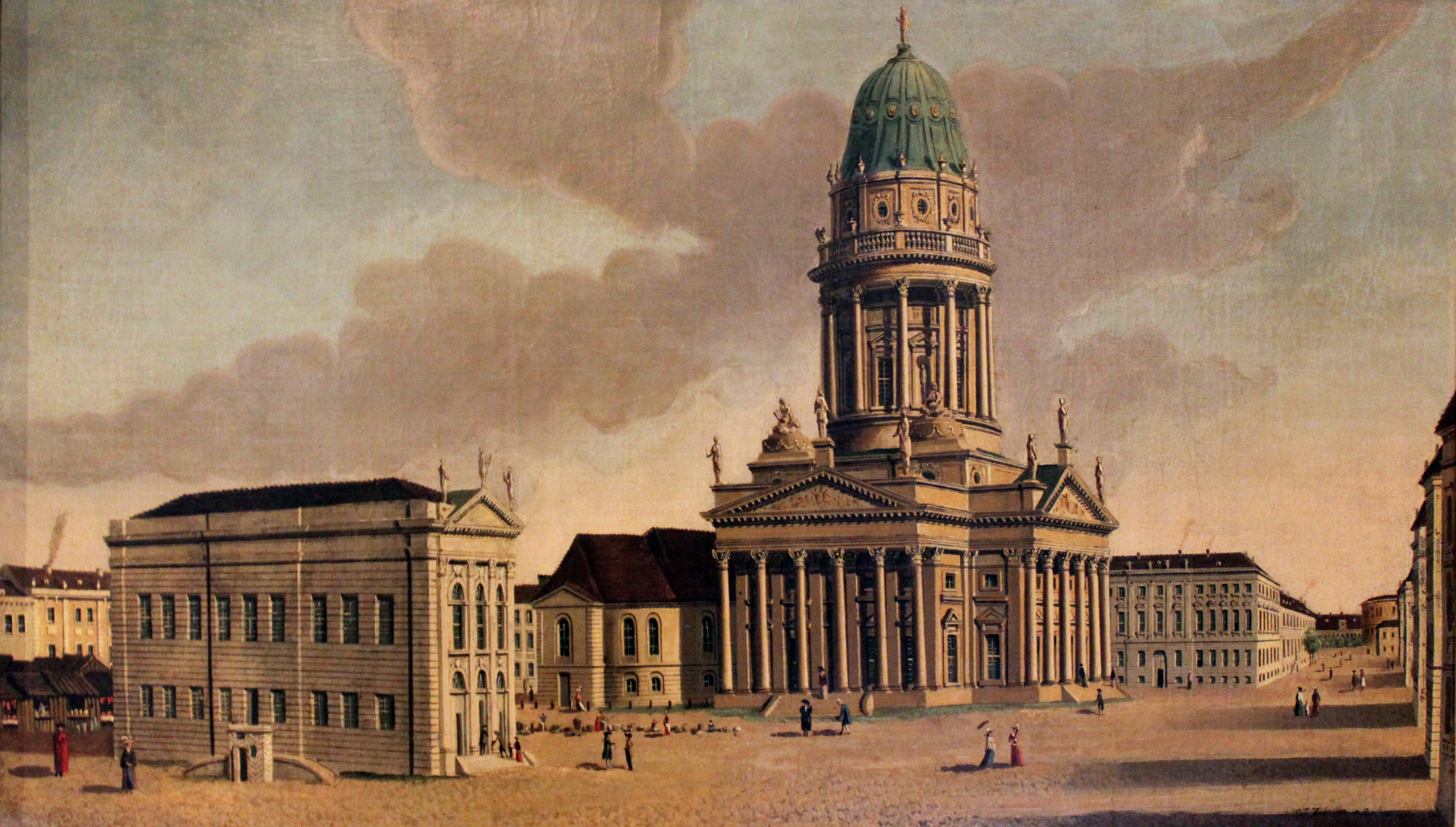
French Comedy House and French Cathedral in the 1780s

- 1780
  - Alte Bibliothek (Berlin) (library) built.
  - Population: 140,625.
- 1781 – Population: 142,375.
- 1782 – Population: 143,098.
- 1783
  - Wednesday Society active.
  - Berlinische Monatsschrift (magazine) begins publication.
  - Population: 144,224.
- 1784 – Population: 145,021.
- 1785 – Population: 146,647.
- 1786
  - Bellevue Palace built.
  - Population: 147,338.
- 1787 – Population: 146,167.
- 1788 – Population: 149,274.
- 1789 – Population: 149,875.
- 1790 – Population: 150,803.
- 1791
  - 24 May: Sing-Akademie zu Berlin (choral society) founded.
  - Brandenburg Gate dedicated.
  - Population: 155,211.
- 1792 – Population: 157,534.
- 1793 – Population: 157,121.
- 1794 – Population: 157,603.
- 1795
  - First steam engine in Berlin, used to power spinning machines.
  - Population: 156,218.
- 1796
  - Zuckerbäckerei Johann Josty & Co. established.
  - Population: 160,733.
- 1797
  - Pfaueninsel Palace built.
  - Population: 164,978.
- 1798 – Population: 169,019.
- 1799
  - 18 March: Bauakademie founded.
  - Population: 169,510.

== 19th century ==
=== 1800s–1860s ===
- 1800 – Population: 172,132.
- 1801 – Population: 176,709.
- 1802 – Population: 177,029.
- 1803 – Population: 178,309.
- 1804
  - Royal Prussian Iron Foundry established.
  - Population: 182,157.
- 1805
  - 25 October: Alexanderplatz renamed in honor of Tsar Alexander I of Russia.
  - Population: 155,706.
- 1806
  - 24 October: Berlin occupied by the French army.
  - 21 November: Napoleon issues Berlin Decree while passing through city.
  - Population: 155,000.
- 1807 – Population: 150,489.
- 1808
  - December: French occupation ends.
  - Population: 145,941.
- 1809
  - Elections to city council held.
  - 25 March: Berlin Police formed.
  - 4 November: Gesetzlose Gesellschaft zu Berlin founded.
  - Population: 151,119.
- 1810
  - 15 October: University of Berlin established.
    - Natural History Museum established as part of the University of Berlin.
  - Population: 162,971.
- 1811 – Population: 169,763.
- 1812
  - Café Josty in business (approximate date).
  - Population: 171,000.
- 1813 – Population: 178,641.
- 1814 – Population: 185,659.
- 1815
  - 10 March: Nathan Israel Department Store established.
  - City becomes part of the Province of Brandenburg.
  - Population: 197,717.
- 1816
  - First continental European locomotive built at the Royal Prussian Iron Foundry.
  - Population: 197,817.
- 1817 – Population: 195,689.
- 1818
  - 18 September: Neue Wache inaugurated.
  - Population: 198,125.
- 1819 – Population: 209,138.
- 1820 – Population: 201,900.
- 1821
  - 30 March: Prussian National Monument for the Liberation Wars opened.
  - 18 June: Schauspielhaus Berlin (theatre) inaugurated.
  - Population: 205,965.
- 1822 – Population: 209,146.
- 1824
  - 29 February: Berlin Missionary Society constituted.
  - Schlossbrücke rebuilt.
- 1825
  - 1 December: Population: 220,277.
  - Sing-Akademie building constructed.
  - First horse-drawn omnibus line operational.
- 1826
  - Glienicke Palace built.
  - First gas lighting in Berlin at the Unter den Linden.
  - Crelle's Journal founded.
- 1827 – 29 April: Premiere of Mendelssohn's opera Hochzeit des Camacho.
- 1828
  - 1 December: Population: 236,830.
  - Berlin Geographical Society founded.
- 1830
  - 3 August: Königliches Museum opens.
  - Museum Vaterländischer Altertümer formed.
- 1831
  - 10 July: Friedrichswerder Church inaugurated.
  - 1 December: Population: 248,682.
- 1834
  - 3 December: Population: 265,122.
  - Café Kranzler in business.
- 1835 – 24 April: Berlin Observatory opened.
- 1837
  - 13 August: Ss. Peter and Paul inaugurated.
  - 3 December: Population: 283,722.
  - August Borsig founds Machine factory on Chausseestraße.
  - Old Palace built.
  - Schinkelplatz laid out.
- 1838
  - 22 September: Berlin-Zehlendorf station opened.
  - 29 October:
    - first railway in Prussia, the Berlin–Potsdam railway opened.
    - Berlin Potsdamer Bahnhof opened.
  - Bote & Bock music publisher in business.
- 1839 – 13 June: Berlin Rathaus Steglitz station opened.
- 1840
  - 3 December: Population: 330,230.
  - Zwei Friedenssäulen erected outside Charlottenburg Palace.
- 1841
  - 1 July:
    - Berlin–Halle railway opened.
    - Berlin Anhalter Bahnhof opened.
  - Verein Berliner Künstler (artists association) founded.
- 1842
  - 1 August: Bernau bei Berlin station opened.
  - 1 October: Stettiner Bahnhof opened.
  - 23 October:
    - Berlin–Wrocław railway opened.
    - Frankfurter Bahnhof opened.
    - Berlin-Friedrichshagen station opened.
    - Berlin-Köpenick station opened.
  - Johann Friedrich Ludwig Wöhlert opens locomotive factory at Chausseestrasse No. 29.
  - Springer-Verlag (publisher) in business.
- 1843
  - 3 December: Population: 353,149.
  - Royal Opera House rebuilt.
- 1844
  - Kroll Opera House opened.
  - Berlin Zoological Garden opened.
- 1845
  - 14 January: Physical Society of Berlin established.
  - Stadtschloss completed.
- 1846
  - 24 September: Discovery of Neptune planet at the Observatory.
  - 15 October:
    - Berlin–Hamburg Railway opened.
    - Berlin-Stresow station opened.
    - Hamburger Bahnhof opened.
    - Nauen station opened.
  - 3 December: Population: 408,502.
  - 15 December: Berlin–Hamburg Railway completed.

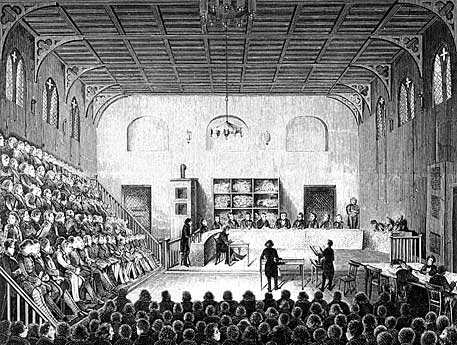
Trial of Polish insurgents in 1847

- 1847
  - April: Prussian parliament begins meeting in the Stadtschloss.
  - 2 August: Start of the trial of 254 Poles accused of preparing the Greater Poland Uprising of 1846.
  - 1 October: Siemens founded.
  - 2 December: Trial of Poles accused of preparing the Greater Poland Uprising of 1846 concluded with eight sentenced to death and 50 to prison.
  - Stern Gesangverein founded.
  - Neue Berliner Musikzeitung begins publishing.
- 1848
  - 18 March: "Barricade fights." King Friedrich Wilhelm promises reforms.
  - 19 March: Polish residents of Berlin petitioned the king to grant amnesty to the convicted Polish insurgents.
  - 20 March: Polish insurgents released from prison.
  - 20 March: Establishment of a Polish Guard in Berlin.
  - 22 May: Elected assembly held.
  - 15 June: Political unrest.
  - 21 November: St. Marien am Behnitz consecrated.
  - 5 December: Elected assembly dissolved and monarchist constitution imposed.
  - Falkensee station opened.
- 1849
  - 3 December: Population: 423,902.
  - Moabit Prison built.
  - Berliner Gummiwaarenfabrik founded.
  - Wolffs Telegraphisches Bureau in business.
- 1850
  - 31 January: Prussian House of Lords established.
  - Berliner Musikschule (music school) founded.
  - Friedrich-von-Raumer-Bibliothek founded.
- 1851
  - 31 May: Equestrian statue of Frederick the Great inaugurated on Unter den Linden.
  - 15 October: Disconto-Gesellschaft founded.
  - 19 November: Corps Vandalia-Teutonia founded.
  - Schering AG founded.
- 1852
  - 3 October: Eisengießerei und Maschinen-Fabrik von L. Schwartzkopff founded.
  - 3 December: Population: 438,958.
  - Luisenstadt Canal constructed.
- 1853
  - 1 October: C. Bechstein Pianofortefabrik founded.
  - F. W. Borchardt delicatessen founded.
  - Katholischer Studentenverein Askania-Burgundia Berlin established.
- 1855
  - 3 December: Population: 447,483.
  - Advertising columns installed in city.
  - New Museum opens.
- 1856 – J. F. Schwarzlose Söhne perfume maker founded.
- 1857 – Berliner Entomologische Zeitschrift scientific journal founded.
- 1858 – Population: 458,637.
- 1859
  - 10 May: Alexander von Humboldt funeral.
  - Berlin-Spandau Ship Canal opened.
  - Charlottenburg Canal opened.
- 1860 – Customs Wall removed.
- 1861
  - Moabit and Wedding become part of Berlin.
  - Tiergarten locality established.
  - Deutsche Allgemeine Zeitung begins publishing.
  - 28 October: St. Michael's Church consecrated.
  - 3 December: Population: 547,571.
- 1862 – Berthold Kempinski wine shop in business.
- 1863
  - Photographers Association founded.
  - Exchange built.
  - Ed. Westermayer piano manufacturer founded.
  - Grieben-Verlag (publisher) in business.
- 1864
  - Wallner Theater built.
  - 3 December: Population: 632,749.
- 1865 – 22 June: First horse-drawn tram line set up.
- 1866
  - 27 February: Lette-Verein (women's educational organization) founded.
  - 7 May: Ferdinand Cohen-Blind's assassination attempt against Otto von Bismarck.
  - 5 September: New Synagogue consecrated.
  - 13 September: Berlin-Grünau station opened.
  - Berlin–Görlitz railway opened.
  - Westend (Berlin) locality established.
- 1867
  - 29 September: Friedrichstadt-Palast built.
  - 1 October: Berlin Old Ostbahnhof opened.
  - 3 December: Population: 702,437.
- 1868
  - 24 May: Berlin-Schöneweide station opened.
  - 20 September: Berlin-Lichterfelde Ost station opened.
  - City wall dismantled.
  - Berliner Pfandbriefinstitut bank established.
  - Palais Strousberg built.
  - Biesdorf Palace built.
  - Kunstgewerbemuseum Berlin established.
- 1869
  - 25 August: Kaulsdorf station opened.
  - 3 October: Rotes Rathaus (city hall) opened.
  - Royal School of Art in Berlin founded.
  - St. Thomas inaugurated.

=== 1870s–1890s ===
- 1870 – 10 March: Deutsche Bank established.
- 1871
  - 18 January: Berlin becomes capital of the newly unified German Empire.
  - 17 July: Berlin Ringbahn (railway) begins operating.
  - 1 December: Population: 826,341.
  - Federal Institute for Materials Research and Testing founded.
- 1872
  - 1 January:
    - Berlin-Gesundbrunnen station opened.
    - Berlin-Neukölln station opened.
    - Berlin-Tempelhof station opened.
  - 1 May:
    - Berlin Frankfurter Allee station opened.
    - Berlin-Wedding station opened.
  - 15 December: Berlin-Lichterfelde West station opened.
  - German Society of Surgery founded.
  - Ludwig Loewe & Co. in business.
  - Berlin-Lichterfelde West station built.
- 1873
  - 2 September: Victory Column inaugurated on Königsplatz.
  - Ethnological Museum of Berlin opened.
- 1874
  - 1 June:
    - Wannsee Railway opened.
    - Berlin-Schlachtensee station opened.
    - Berlin-Wannsee station opened.
  - 1 November: Berlin-Friedenau station opened.
  - Fachschule für Dekomponieren, Komponieren und Musterzeichnen established.
  - Twelve Apostels Church opened.
- 1875
  - 1 February: Berlin Treptow station opened.
  - 1 May: Berlin Greifswalder Straße station opened.
  - 17 June:
    - Berlin Dresdner Bahnhof opened.
    - Marienfelde station opened.
    - Rangsdorf railway station opened.
  - 15 October: Royal Prussian Military Railway opened.
  - 1 December: Population: 966,858.
  - Socialist Workers' Party of Germany headquartered in Berlin.
  - Hotel Kaiserhof in business.
  - Königliche Hochschule für Musik active.
- 1876
  - 1 January: Reichsbank established.
  - 1 April: Orenstein & Koppel founded.
  - 31 December: Population: 980,194.
  - Imperial Health Agency established.
  - National Gallery opens.
  - Spandau Prison built.
- 1877
  - 1 June: Berlin-Blankenburg station opened.
  - 10 July:
    - Berlin-Hermsdorf station opened.
    - Berlin-Schönholz station opened.
    - Berlin-Wilhelmsruh station opened.
    - Berlin-Wittenau station opened.
    - Berlin Wollankstraße station opened.
    - Berlin Old Nordbahnhof opened.
  - 15 November:
    - Berlin Ringbahn completed.
    - Berlin-Halensee station opened.
    - Berlin Hermannstraße station opened.
    - Berlin-Westend station opened.
  - Berlin Wuhlheide station opened.
  - 31 December: Population: 1,008,566.
  - Wasserturm Prenzlauer Berg water tower completed.
- 1878
  - 13 July: City hosts Congress of Berlin.
  - Berlin Stadtbahn (city railway) begins operating.
- 1879
  - 1 April: Technische Hochschule in Charlottenburg (now Technische Universität Berlin) formed.
  - 15 May: Berlin-Rahnsdorf station opened.
  - 26 June: Berlin-Buch station opened.
  - 1 August:
    - Berlin-Grunewald station opened.
    - Berlin Schönhauser Allee station opened.
  - 1 September: Rangierbahnhof station opened.
  - Imperial Treasury headquartered in city.
  - Crown Prince Bridge built.
  - Plötzensee Prison established.
- 1880
  - 15 June: New Berlin Anhalter Bahnhof opened.
  - 15 August: Südende station opened.
  - 9 September: Weißensee cemetery inaugurated.
  - 15 October: Berlin-Pankow station opened.
  - 1 December: Population: 1,122,330.
  - Berlin movement initiated.
  - Matthew Church (Berlin-Steglitz) built.
- 1881
  - 29 April: Electromote presented.
  - 4 May: Berlin Storkower Straße station opened.
  - 16 May: Gross-Lichterfelde Tramway in service, the world's first electric tram line.
  - 15 October: Berlin Julius-Leber-Brücke station opened.
  - Berlin administrative district separates from Province of Brandenburg.
  - Martin-Gropius-Bau built.
  - Berlin-Lichtenberg station opened.
  - Zentralfriedhof Friedrichsfelde cemetery built.
  - Städtischer Friedhof III cemetery built.
  - Industrial museum established.
- 1882
  - 7 February:
    - Berlin Stadtbahn (railway) begins operating.
    - Berlin Alexanderplatz station opened.
    - Berlin Bellevue station opened.
    - Berlin-Charlottenburg station opened.
    - Berlin Hackescher Markt station opened.
    - Berlin Zoologischer Garten railway station opened.
    - Berlin Jannowitzbrücke station opened.
    - Berlin Friedrichstraße station opened
    - Stralau-Rummelsburg station opened.
  - 1 May: Berlin Philharmonic established.
  - 15 November:
    - Berlin-Karow station opened.
    - Neu-Rahnsdorf station opened.
  - Pestalozzi-Fröbel Haus founded.
  - Berlin-Blankenheim railway opened.
  - Kietz-Rummelsburg station opened.
- 1883
  - 1 June: Lichtenrade station opened.
  - 15 December: Berlin Heidelberger Platz station opened.
  - AEG founded.
  - Berliner Lokal-Anzeiger founded.
- 1884
  - Dankeskirche (church) built.
  - 20 May: Berlin-Waidmannslust station opened.
  - 11 August: Berlin Warschauer Straße station opened.
  - 7 September: Dahlewitz railway station opened.
  - 15 November: City hosts West Africa Conference.
- 1885
  - 5 January: Berlin-Tiergarten station opened.
  - 26 February: West Africa Conference concluded.
  - 1 August: Berlin-Biesdorf station opened.
  - 19 November: St. George's Anglican Church inaugurated.
  - 1 December: Population: 1,315,287.
  - St. George's Anglican Church built.
- 1886 – Ethnological museum established.
- 1887
  - German Colonial Society headquartered in Berlin.
  - Kaiser-Wilhelm-Brücke (Berlin) (bridge) and Heiligekreuzkirche (church) built.
  - Society for Friends of Photography founded.
- 1888
  - 3 March: Urania founded.
  - 15 April: BFC Germania 1888 founded.
  - 11 September: Lessing Theater opened.
- 1889
  - 6 June: BFC Viktoria 1889 founded.
  - 14 June: Treaty of Berlin (1889) signed over Samoa.
  - Museum of Natural History opens.
  - Academic Alpine Club of Berlin formed.
- 1890
  - 5 February: Allianz founded.
  - 20 May: Baumschulenweg station opened.
  - 1 December: Population: 1,578,794.
  - May Day begins.
  - Wittenbergplatz laid out.
- 1891
  - April: Moltke Bridge opened.
  - 1 July: Robert Koch Institute founded.
  - 1 October: Western Berlin Yorckstraße station opened.
  - Oder–Spree Canal opened.
  - Hotel Bristol in business.
- 1892
  - 4 January: Berliner Illustrirte Zeitung begins publishing.
  - 1 May:
  - Berlin Bundesplatz station opened.
  - Berlin Prenzlauer Allee station opened.
  - 2 July: Berliner SV 1892 founded.
  - 25 July: Hertha BSC founded.
  - 24 September: Komische Oper Berlin opened.
  - 20 December: Wriezen Railway opened.
  - Neues Theater opens.
  - Luther Bridge opened.
- 1893
  - 26 February: Gethsemane Church inaugurated.
  - 26 June: St. Sebastian opened.
  - 1 August: Lichterfelde Süd station opened.
  - 1 October:
    - First section of the Kremmen Railway opened.
    - Berlin Alt-Reinickendorf station opened.
    - Berlin Karl-Bonhoeffer-Nervenklinik station opened.
    - Berlin-Pankow-Heinersdorf station opened.
    - Schulzendorf railway station opened.
    - Berlin-Tegel railway station opened.
    - Hennigsdorf station opened.
  - 20 December: Second section of the Kremmen Railway opened.
  - Department of Medical Microbiology (Schering AG) established.
  - Mendelssohn Palace built.
- 1894
  - 8 January: Adlershof station opened.
  - 1 May:
    - Berlin Beusselstraße station opened.
    - Berlin Jungfernheide station opened.
  - 1 October: Eichborndamm station opened.
  - 5 December: Reichstag building completed.
  - Friedrichs Bridge completely rebuilt.
  - Chapel of Reconciliation built.
  - Ss. Constantine and Helena Church built.
- 1895
  - 15 February: Attilastraße station opened.
  - 1 May:
    - Berlin-Karlshorst station opened.
    - Berlin Landsberger Allee station opened.
  - 1 September:
    - Kaiser Wilhelm Memorial Church consecrated.
    - Mahlsdorf railway station opened.
  - 15 September: Spandau Synagogue dedicated.
  - 1 December:
    - Population: 1,677,304.
    - Lankwitz station opened.
  - 13 December: Premiere of Mahler's Symphony No. 2.
  - 17 December: Berolina unveiled.
  - Pan (magazine) begins publishing.
- 1896
  - Oberbaum Bridge rebuilt.
  - 1 May: Great Industrial Exposition of Berlin opened.
  - 8 June: Baumschulenweg–Neukölln link line opened.
  - 1 August: Berlin Savignyplatz station opened.
  - September: Treptow Observatory opened.
  - 17 September: Weidendammer Bridge rebuilt.
  - 15 October: Great Industrial Exposition of Berlin closed.
  - Messter Film in business.
- 1897
  - 22 March: National Kaiser Wilhelm Monument unveiled.
  - 1 May: Heiligensee station opened.
  - 30 September: International Automobile Exhibition begins.
  - Rot-Weiss Tennis Club founded.
- 1898
  - 1 May:
    - Ahrensfelde station opened.
    - Berlin-Marzahn station opened.
  - 31 August: Population: 1,820,000.
  - 1 October: Berlin Westhafen station opened.
  - 15 October: Wriezen Railway completed.
  - Jewel Palace (Berlin) built.
  - Einkaufsgenossenschaft der Kolonialwarenhändler im Halleschen Torbezirk zu Berlin established.
  - Berlin Secession (art group) founded.
  - Café des Westens in business.
- 1899
  - 18 March: Die Woche begins publishing.
  - 30 April: Kopenhagener Straße opened.
  - 2 December: Tripartite Convention signed, dividing Samoa into German and American spheres of influence.
  - Deutsches Kolonialmuseum (museum) opens.

== 20th century ==
=== 1900s–1945 ===
- 1900
  - 15 August: Berlin-Staaken station opened.
  - 1 December: Population: 1,888,848.
  - Berlin Automobile Association founded.
  - Viktoria-Luise-Platz laid out.
- 1901
  - Population: 1,901,567.
  - 18 January: Überbrettl cabaret opened.
  - 1 October: Teltow railway station opened.
  - 1 December:
  - Anhalt Suburban Line opened.
  - Berlin Papestraße station opened.
  - Neuer Marstall built.
  - Catholic Apostolic Church (Kreuzberg) opened.
- 1902
  - 15 February:
    - Berlin U-Bahn begins operating.
    - Kottbusser Tor (Berlin U-Bahn) station opened.
    - Möckernbrücke (Berlin U-Bahn) station opened.
  - 18 February:
    - Görlitzer Bahnhof (Berlin U-Bahn) station opened.
    - Hallesches Tor (Berlin U-Bahn) station opened (U1 line).
    - Berlin Potsdamer Platz station station opened.
    - Berlin Potsdamer Platz station station opened.
    - Schlesisches Tor (Berlin U-Bahn) station opened.
  - 11 March:
    - Bülowstraße (Berlin U-Bahn) station opened.
    - Nollendorfplatz (Berlin U-Bahn) station opened.
    - Berlin Zoologischer Garten U-Bahn station opened.
    - Wittenbergplatz (Berlin U-Bahn) station opened.
  - 1 May: Berlin-Nikolassee station opened.
  - 22 July: Capernaum Church completed.
  - 17 August: Warschauer Straße (Berlin U-Bahn) station opened.
  - 14 December:
    - Ernst-Reuter-Platz (Berlin U-Bahn) station opened.
- 1903
  - 1 May: Western Berlin Yorckstraße station opened.
  - 27 May: Telefunken founded.
  - 1 October: Berlin-Friedrichsfelde Ost station opened.
  - German Colonial House built.
  - Original American Church in Berlin built.
- 1904
  - 4 September: Rykestrasse Synagogue inaugurated.
  - 1 November: Zehlendorf-Beerenstraße station opened.
  - Kaiser-Friedrich-Museum opens.
  - Tietz department store in business on Alexanderplatz.
- 1905
  - 27 February: Berlin Cathedral consecrated after rebuilding.
  - 20 May: Charlottenburg Town Hall opened.
  - 1 June: Siemensstadt-Fürstenbrunn station opened.
  - 20 December: Tabor Church consecrated.
  - Neues Schauspielhaus built.
  - Population: 2,040,148.
- 1906
  - 14 May:
    - Deutsche Oper (Berlin U-Bahn) station opened.
    - Richard-Wagner-Platz (Berlin U-Bahn) station opened.
  - 2 June: Teltow Canal opened.
  - 23 September: Hackesche Höfe courtyard opened.
  - 8 November: Museum of East Asian Art founded.
  - Britz Canal opened.
  - Griebnitz Canal opened.
  - Virchow Hospital opens in Moabit.
- 1907
  - 1 January: Schiller Theater opened.
  - 17 February: Reformation Church consecrated.
  - 27 March: Kaufhaus des Westens established.
  - 16 November: Glienicke Bridge inaugurated.
  - Hotel Fürstenhof built.
  - Märkisches Museum built in Köllnischer Park.
- 1908
  - 29 March:
    - Kaiserdamm (Berlin U-Bahn) station opened.
    - Sophie-Charlotte-Platz (Berlin U-Bahn) station opened.
    - Theodor-Heuss-Platz (Berlin U-Bahn) station opened.
  - 2 April: Hotel Excelsior opened.
  - 1 October:
    - Hausvogteiplatz (Berlin U-Bahn) station opened.
    - Kaiserhof U-Bahn station opened.
    - Spittelmarkt (Berlin U-Bahn) station opened.
    - Stadtmitte (Berlin U-Bahn) U2 platform opened.
  - Reichskanzlerplatz laid out.
  - Charlottenburg Gate opened.
  - Hotel Esplanade Berlin opened.
  - Friedrichstraßenpassage shopping arcade built.
  - Shot Ball Tower (Berlin) built.
- 1909
  - 1 May: Berlin Botanischer Garten station opened.
  - 23 May: Rennbahn station opened.
  - 26 September: Johannisthal Air Field opened.
  - 1 November: Berlin Heerstraße station opened.
  - AEG turbine factory built.
  - Expressionist Der Neue Club founded.
- 1910
  - April: Liebermann Villa completed.
  - 1 May: Berlin-Frohnau station opened.
  - 24 May: Berlin-Dahlem Botanical Garden and Botanical Museum opened.
  - 15 July: Berlin-Spandau station opened.
  - 7 August: Last horse-drawn tram line closed.
  - 17 November: Hohenzollern-Sport-Palast opened.
  - 1 November: Berlin Hohenzollerndamm station opened.
  - 1 December:
    - Population: 2,071,257.
    - Bayerischer Platz (Berlin U-Bahn) station opened.
    - Berlin Innsbrucker Platz station station opened.
    - Rathaus Schöneberg (Berlin U-Bahn) station opened.
    - Viktoria-Luise-Platz (Berlin U-Bahn) station opened.
  - Berlin Hohenzollerndamm station built.
  - Rathaus Schöneberg (Berlin U-Bahn) opened.
  - Der Sturm magazine begins publication.
- 1911
  - 9 April: Tabor Church (Berlin-Wilhelmshagen) consecrated.
  - 5 September: Berlin-Pichelsberg railway station opened.
  - 1 October: Berlin Sonnenallee station opened.
  - 29 October: Altes Stadthaus inaugurated.
  - 31 December: Population: 2,084,045.
  - Kaiser Wilhelm Society for the Advancement of Sciences founded.
  - Kaiser Wilhelm Institute for Physical Chemistry and Electrochemistry founded.
  - Hotel Esplanade built.
  - Haus Cumberland built.
  - Spandau Suburban Line opened.
  - Die Aktion magazine begins publication.
- 1912
  - February: Haus Potsdam built.
  - 26 August: Fasanenstrasse Synagogue opened.
  - 22 September: Mater Dolorosa church consecrated.
  - 3 November: Gleisdreieck (Berlin U-Bahn) station opened.
  - 7 November: Deutsche Oper Berlin opened.
  - 31 December: Population: 2,095,030.
- 1913
  - 8 June:
    - Deutsches Stadion (Berlin) opened.
    - Stadion U-Bahn station opened.
  - 15 June: Märchenbrunnen opened.
  - 1 July:
    - Berlin Alexanderplatz station U-Bahn line U2 opened.
    - Klosterstraße (Berlin U-Bahn) station opened.
    - Märkisches Museum (Berlin U-Bahn) station opened.
  - 27 July:
    - Eberswalder Straße (Berlin U-Bahn) station opened.
    - Schönhauser Tor U-Bahn station opened.
    - Berlin Schönhauser Allee station station opened.
    - Senefelderplatz (Berlin U-Bahn) station opened.
  - 12 October:
    - Breitenbachplatz (Berlin U-Bahn) station opened.
    - Dahlem-Dorf (Berlin U-Bahn) station opened.
    - Fehrbelliner Platz (Berlin U-Bahn) station opened.
    - Berlin Heidelberger Platz U-Bahn station opened.
    - Hohenzollernplatz (Berlin U-Bahn) station opened.
    - Podbielskiallee (Berlin U-Bahn) station opened.
    - Rüdesheimer Platz (Berlin U-Bahn) station opened.
    - Freie Universität (Thielplatz) (Berlin U-Bahn) station opened.
    - Thielpalatz U-Bahn station opened.
  - 17 October: Johannisthal air disaster.
  - 31 December: Population: 2,079,156.
  - Cines-Palast (cinema) opened.
  - Neukölln Ship Canal opened.
  - Schillerpark opened.
- 1914
  - 25 March: Rathaus Schöneberg opened.
  - 31 December: Population: 1,945,684.
  - Volksbühne (theatre) and Bendlerblock built.
  - Pacifist Bund Neues Vaterland headquartered in city.
- 1915 – 31 December: Population: 1,835,094.
- 1916
  - 1 April: Witzleben station opened.
  - 19 November: Deulig Film company established.
  - 1 December: Population: 1,771,491.
  - Schleusen Bridge rebuilt.
  - Eiserne Bridge rebuilt.
  - Körnerpark opened.
- 1917
  - 22 November: Standardisation Committee of German Industry founded.
  - 5 December: Population: 1,744,085.
  - 13 December: Deutsche Luft-Reederei founded.
  - 18 December: UFA GmbH established.
  - Rathaus Friedenau built.
- 1918
  - 9 November:
    - Proclamation of the Republic by Philipp Scheidemann from the Reichstag building.
    - Die Rote Fahne newspaper begins publication.
  - 23 December: The Volksmarinedivision occupies the Reich Chancellery.
  - 24 December: Christmas crisis.
  - 31 December: Population: 1,748,000.
- 1919
  - 1 January: Communist Party of Germany founded.
  - 5–12 January: Spartacist uprising.
  - 15 January: Socialists Rosa Luxemburg and Karl Liebknecht killed by Freikorps.
  - February: Dadaist Jedermann sein eigner Fussball published.
  - 3–16 March: Berlin March Battles: Socialist uprising crushed by the government, 1,200 killed.
  - 10 March: Marxist revolutionary Leo Jogiches killed by right-wing paramilitaries.
  - May: Premiere of LGBT-themed film Anders als die Andern.
  - 22 June: Prizyv begins publishing.
  - 6 July: Institut für Sexualwissenschaft opened.
  - 8 October: Population: 1,902,508.
  - 7 November: SPD politician Hugo Haase killed by Johann Voss.
  - 31 December: Population: 1,928,432.
  - City becomes capital of the Weimar Republic.
  - Deutsche Luft-Reederei airline begins operating its Weimar-Berlin route.
- 1920
  - February: Berlin Psychoanalytic Institute established.
  - 13–17 March: Kapp Putsch.
  - June: First International Dada Fair held.
  - 20 June: SC Berliner Amateure founded.
  - 7 August: Stadion An der Alten Försterei opened.
  - 16 August: Köllnische Heide station opened.
  - 1 October: City area expands per Greater Berlin Act, incorporating Charlottenburg, Köpenick, Lichtenberg, Neukölln, Schöneberg, Spandau, and Wilmersdorf.
  - October: Deutsche Hochschule für Politik founded.
  - 31 December: Population: 3,879,409.
  - Lokomotiv-Versuchsamt Grunewald facility established.
  - Akaflieg Berlin founded.
- 1921
  - 15 March: Assassination of Talat Pasha by Soghomon Tehlirian.
  - 25 August: U.S.–German Peace Treaty (1921) signed.
  - 24 September: AVUS established.
  - 31 December: Population: 3,914,151.
  - Archenhold School built.
- 1922
  - 28 March: Assassination of Vladimir Dmitrievich Nabokov by Russian monarchists.
  - 17 April: Cemal Azmi assassinated by Armenian revolutionaries.
  - 27 April: Release of the first part of Dr. Mabuse the Gambler by Fritz Lang, filmed and set in Berlin.
  - 22 May: Neu-Westend (Berlin U-Bahn) station opened.
  - 24 June: Foreign Minister Walther Rathenau assassinated.
  - December: International of Revolutionary Syndicalists founded in Berlin.
  - 31 December: Population: 3,953,920.
- 1923
  - 30 January:
    - Französische Straße (Berlin U-Bahn) station opened.
    - Berlin Friedrichstraße U-Bahn station opened.
    - Hallesches Tor U6 line opened.
    - Kochstraße (Berlin U-Bahn) station opened.
    - Oranienburger Tor (Berlin U-Bahn) station opened.
    - Naturkundemuseum (Berlin U-Bahn) station opened.
    - Stadtmitte (Berlin U-Bahn) U6 platform opened.
  - 8 March:
    - Leopoldplatz (Berlin U-Bahn) station opened.
    - Reinickendorfer Straße (Berlin U-Bahn) station opened.
    - Schwartzkopffstraße (Berlin U-Bahn) station opened.
    - Seestraße (Berlin U-Bahn) station opened.
    - Berlin-Wedding U-Bahn station opened.
  - 25 August: Last horse-drawn omnibus run in Berlin.
  - 8 October: Tempelhof Airport established.
  - 31 December: Population: 3,918,985.
- 1924
  - 9 February: Stadion am Gesundbrunnen opened.
  - 19 April:
    - Mehringdamm (Berlin U-Bahn) station opened.
    - Gneisenaustraße (Berlin U-Bahn) station opened.
  - 31 May: Bank of Workers, Employees, and Civil Servants established.
  - 7 July: Stadt und Land founded.
  - 14 December: Südstern (Berlin U-Bahn) station opened.
  - 31 December: Population: 3,986,458.
  - Traffic light installed in Potsdamer Platz.
  - Internationale Funkausstellung Berlin (radio exhibit) begins.
  - Berlin Radio Symphony Orchestra active.
- 1925
  - 1 February: Deutsche Werke formed.
  - 26 April: Ahmadiyya Mosque Berlin inaugurated.
  - 16 June: Population: 4,024,286.
  - 31 December: Population: 4,082,778.
  - Hufeisensiedlung housing estate construction begins.
- 1926
  - 6 January: Deutsche Luft Hansa founded.
  - 14 February: Kreuzberg U-Bahn station opened.
  - 11 April:
    - Hermannplatz (Berlin U-Bahn) U7 platform opened.
    - Bergstrasse U-Bahn station opened.
    - Rathaus Neukölln (Berlin U-Bahn) station opened.
  - 24 April: Treaty of Berlin (1926) signed with the Soviet Union.
  - 3 September: Funkturm Berlin (radio tower) erected.
  - 24 October:
    - Kurfürstenstraße (Berlin U-Bahn) station opened.
    - Nollendorfplatz U-Bahn station platforms added.
  - 31 December: Population: 4,125,824.
  - Das Buddhistische Haus built.
- 1927
  - 10 January: Premiere of film Metropolis.
  - 1 May: Adolf Hitler gives his first speech in Berlin, at the Clou Concert Hall.
  - 4 July: Der Angriff begins publishing.
  - 17 July:
    - U8 (Berlin U-Bahn) line opened.
    - Boddinstraße (Berlin U-Bahn) station opened.
    - Hermannplatz (Berlin U-Bahn) U8 platform opened.
    - Schönleinstraße (Berlin U-Bahn) station opened.
  - 10 September: Paradestraße (Berlin U-Bahn) station opened.
  - 17 November: Betriebshaltepunkt Nieder-Schöneweide station opened.
  - 31 December: Population: 4,195,725.
  - Tempelhof Airport terminal built.
  - Kaiser Wilhelm Institute of Anthropology, Human Heredity, and Eugenics founded.
- 1928
  - 12 February: Kottbusser Tor U-Bahn station U8 platform opened.
  - 6 April:
    - Neanderstraße U-Bahn station opened.
    - Moritzplatz (Berlin U-Bahn) station opened.
  - 23 August: Berlin Eichkamp station opened.
  - 31 August: Premiere of Brecht's The Threepenny Opera.
  - 1 October: Founding of NSDAP Gau Berlin.
  - 7 October: Priesterweg station opened.
  - 10 December: Berlin Westkreuz station opened.
  - 31 December: Population: 4,272,375.
  - First TV broadcast in Berlin.
  - Titania Palast (theatre) opens.
- 1929
  - 11 April: Kino Babylon opened.
  - 1–3 May: Blutmai unrest. 32 killed, 1,228 arrested and 11,000 rounds of ammunition fired by the police.
  - 28 May: Poststadion opened.
  - 4 August: Leinestraße (Berlin U-Bahn) station opened.
  - 22 December:
    - Krumme Lanke (Berlin U-Bahn) station opened.
    - Onkel Toms Hütte (Berlin U-Bahn) station opened.
    - Oskar-Helene-Heim (Berlin U-Bahn) station opened.
    - Ruhleben (Berlin U-Bahn) station opened.
    - Berlin-Tempelhof U-Bahn station opened.
  - 25 December: Lichtburg cinema opens.
  - 31 December: Population: 4,328,760.
  - Charlotten Bridge rebuilt.
  - Spandauer Kirchenmusikschule established.
- 1930
  - 18 April:
    - Berlin Alexanderplatz station U-Bahn line U8 opened.
    - Bernauer Straße (Berlin U-Bahn) station opened.
    - Berlin-Gesundbrunnen U-Bahn station opened.
    - Berlin Jannowitzbrücke U-Bahn station opened.
    - Rosenthaler Platz (Berlin U-Bahn) station opened.
    - Voltastraße (Berlin U-Bahn) station opened.
    - Weinmeisterstraße (Berlin U-Bahn) station opened.
  - 29 June: Vinetastraße (Berlin U-Bahn) station opened.
  - 13 August: Roman Catholic Archdiocese of Berlin established.
  - 17 August: Mommsenstadion opened.
  - 30 September: Berlin rocket launching site opened.
  - 21 December:
    - Berlin Alexanderplatz station U-Bahn line U8 opened.
    - Frankfurter Allee (Berlin U-Bahn) station opened.
    - Frankfurter Tor (Berlin U-Bahn) station opened.
    - Friedrichsfelde (Berlin U-Bahn) station opened.
    - Grenzallee (Berlin U-Bahn) station opened.
    - Neukölln (Berlin U-Bahn) station opened.
    - Magdalenenstraße (Berlin U-Bahn) station opened.
    - Berlin-Lichtenberg station U-Bahn station opened.
    - Samariterstraße (Berlin U-Bahn) station opened.
    - Schillingstraße (Berlin U-Bahn) station opened.
    - Strausberger Platz (Berlin U-Bahn) station opened.
    - Weberwiese (Berlin U-Bahn) station opened.
  - 31 December: Population: 4,332,834.
  - Pergamon Museum built.
- 1931
  - 22 January: Haus des Rundfunks inaugurated.
  - 9 August: Murder of Paul Anlauf and Franz Lenck.
  - 31 December: Population: 4,314,466.
  - Großsiedlung Siemensstadt housing built.
- 1932
  - 24 January: Hitler Youth member Herbert Norkus killed by Communists.
  - 14–20 March: Ice Hockey European Championship 1932.
  - 3–7 November: 1932 Berlin transport strike.
  - 31 December: Population: 4,273,701.
  - Columbushaus built on Potsdamer Platz.
- 1933
  - Nazi headquarters relocated to Berlin from Munich.
  - 30 January: Hitler named Chancellor.
  - 27 February: Reichstag fire.
  - 19 March: Kirche am Hohenzollernplatz inaugurated.
  - April: Research Office of the Reich Air Ministry established.
  - 26 April: Nazi Gestapo (secret police) headquartered in Berlin, on Prinz-Albrecht-Straße.
  - 6 May: Institut für Sexualwissenschaft destroyed by the German Student Union.
  - 10 May: Nazi book burnings in Opernplatz.
  - 6 June: Afghan ambassador to Germany, Prince Shirdar Mohammed Aziz Khan, assassinated by an Afghan student.
  - 16 June: Population: 4,242,501.
  - 21–26 June: Köpenick's week of bloodshed.
  - 1 July: Berlin Innsbrucker Platz station opened.
  - July: Columbia concentration camp established.
  - 19 September: Ufa-Palast am Zoo premiere of the Hitlerjunge Quex, the first major Nazi propaganda film.
  - 22 September: Reich Chamber of Culture established.
  - 31 December: Population: 4,221,024.
  - City becomes capital of the Greater German Reich.
  - Hufeisensiedlung housing built.
  - Strength Through Joy national leisure programme headquartered in Berlin.
- 1934
  - 30 June – 2 July: Night of the Long Knives.
    - Kurt von Schleicher, Ferdinand von Bredow, Gregor Strasser, Erich Klausener, Edgar Jung, Herbert von Bose, Karl Ernst and Karl-Günther Heimsoth killed.
  - 1 July: Berlin Sundgauer Straße station opened.
  - 27 September: Ferdowsi millennial celebration in Berlin.
  - 31 December: Population: 4,218,332.
  - City becomes seat of the Greater Berlin and Mark Brandenburg Gaue (Nazi administrative divisions).
- 1935
  - 31 January: Berlin Humboldthain station opened.
  - 22 March: First TV broadcasting service in the world in operation.
  - 28 March: Premiere of the film Triumph of the Will.
  - 1 October: Berlin Bornholmer Straße station opened.
  - 29 November: Deutschlandhalle inaugurated.
  - 31 December: Population: 4,226,584.
  - Olympiapark Schwimmstadion Berlin built.
  - Nazi SS-Hauptamt headquartered in Berlin, on Prinz-Albrecht-Straße.
- 1936
  - January: Gosen Canal opened.
  - 1 April: Luftkriegsschule 2 Berlin-Gatow staff and technical college opened.
  - 28 May:
    - Berlin Nord-Süd Tunnel opened.
    - Berlin Oranienburger Straße station opened.
  - July: Sachsenhausen concentration camp established near the city.
  - 16 July: Berlin-Marzahn concentration camp established.
  - 27 July: Berlin Brandenburger Tor station opened.
  - 1 August: Olympic Stadium opened.
  - 1–16 August: 1936 Summer Olympics held.
  - 2 August: Waldbühne amphitheater opened.
  - August: Air Ministry Building completed.
  - 31 December: Population: 4,267,560.
  - Bundesautobahn 9 from Berlin to Munich opened.
  - Vorbunker built.
- 1937
  - 5 January: Julius Lippert becomes mayor.
  - 30 January: Albert Speer becomes Generalbauinspektor for the Reich capital.
  - 28 May: Volkswagen auto company founded.
  - 31 December: Population: 4,314,432.
  - 700th anniversary of the city celebrated.
  - Messe Berlin built.
- 1938
  - 20 April: Olympia (1938 film) released.
  - 29 April: DEST founded.
  - 9–10 November: Kristallnacht; Fasanenstrasse Synagogue and Spandau Synagogue burned.
  - 31 December: Population: 4,347,875.
  - Schwimmhalle Finckensteinallee opened.
  - Helicopter flight demonstrated.
  - Elektro-Mess-Technik founded.
- 1939
  - 10 January: New Reich Chancellery completed.
  - 15 April: Berlin Potsdamer Platz station opened.
  - 20 April: Adolf Hitler's 50th birthday.
  - 17 May: Population: 4,338,756.
  - 1 September: German declaration of war against Poland.
  - 31 December: Population: 4,330,640.
- 1940
  - 1 January: Altglienicke station opened.
  - July: Ludwig Steeg becomes mayor.
  - 25 August: Bombing of Berlin in World War II begins.
  - 31 December: Population: 4,330,810.
  - Reichsbank extension (Haus am Werderschen Markt) built.
  - Telefunkenwerk Zehlendorf built.
- 1941
  - 14 October: Deportation of Jews to the east ordered by Kurt Daluege.
  - 11 December: German declaration of war against the United States.
  - 31 December: Population: 4,383,882.
  - Tempelhof Airport terminal built.
  - Zoo Tower built.
- 1942
  - 20 January: Wannsee Conference.
  - 31 December: Population: 4,478,102.
  - Schwerbelastungskörper built.
- 1943
  - 24 February: Polish resistance organization Zagra-Lin detonated a bomb at a railway station.
  - 28 January: Mass deportation of Jews to Auschwitz concentration camp ordered.
  - February–March: Rosenstrasse protest.
  - 18 February: Proclamation of Total War in the Sportpalast speech by Joseph Goebbels.
  - 1 April: Berlin Albrechtshof station opened.
  - 10 April: Polish resistance organization Zagra-Lin detonated a bomb at a railway station.
  - 18 November: Battle of Berlin (RAF campaign) begins.
  - 31 December: Population: 4,430,204.
  - Bunker (Berlin) air raid shelter built.
- 1944
  - 31 March: RAF bombing campaign ends.
  - 21 July: Execution of 20 July plot conspirators.
  - 23 October: Führerbunker completed.
  - 31 December: Population: 4,361,398.
- 1945
  - 16 April: Battle of Berlin begins.
  - 20 April: Operation Clausewitz begins.
  - 22 April: Panzerbär begins publishing.
  - 23 April: Battle in Berlin begins.
  - 24 April: Red Army encirclement of Berlin complete.
  - 30 April: Death of Adolf Hitler in the Führerbunker.
  - 1 May: Suicides of Joseph and Magda Goebbels.
  - 2 May:
    - Red Army capture of the Reichstag building.
    - Battle of Berlin ends.
    - Nikolai Berzarin becomes commander of the Soviet sector of city.
  - 8 May: Ceremonial German Instrument of Surrender signed in Karlshorst.
  - 21 May: Berliner Zeitung begins publishing.
  - Spring–summer: Mass rape of 200,000 German women by the Red Army.
  - 5 June: Berlin Declaration (1945).
  - 13 June: Deutsche Volkszeitung begins publishing.
  - 4 July: Floyd L. Parks becomes commander of the U.S. sector of city.
  - 5 July: Lewis Lyne becomes commander of the British sector of city.
  - 7 July: Das Volk begins publishing.
  - 11 July: Geoffroi du Bois de Beauchesne becomes commander of the French sector of city.
  - 17 July-2 August: Potsdam Conference held.
  - 21 July: Victory Parade.
  - 12 August: Population: 2,807,405.
  - 30 August: Allied Control Council constituted.
  - 12 December: Berlin Air Safety Centre established.
  - 31 December: Population: 3,064,629.

=== 1946–1989 ===
- 1946
  - 15 May: Buckower Chaussee station opened.
  - October: City election held.
  - 29 October: Population: 3,170,832.
  - 31 December: Population: 3,213,966.
  - Berlin Schönefeld Airport opened.
- 1947
  - 8 February: Karlslust dance hall fire.
  - Ernst Reuter becomes mayor.
  - 31 December: Population: 3,271,179.
- 1948
  - 5 April: 1948 Gatow air disaster.
  - 24 June: Soviet blockade begins.
  - 26 June: Allied airlift of supplies begins.
  - 4 December: Free University of Berlin established.
  - 31 December: Population: 3,312,307.
  - Berlin Tegel Airport opened.
  - Kampfgruppe gegen Unmenschlichkeit formed.
  - Handelsorganisation grocery opens in East Berlin.
- 1949
  - 12 May: Berlin Blockade ends.
  - November: Berliner Ensemble founded.
  - 8 December: Supreme Court of East Germany set up.
  - 31 December: Population: 3,328,193.
  - City divided into East Berlin and West Berlin.
  - East Berlin becomes capital of the German Democratic Republic.
  - Currywurst introduced on Kantstraße.
- 1950
  - 18 January: Marienfelde refugee transit camp opened.
  - 29 April: Liebknecht Bridge opened.
  - 20 May: Walter-Ulbricht-Stadion opened.
  - 31 December: Population: 3,336,026.
  - Werner-Seelenbinder-Halle opened.
  - Academy of Arts established in East Berlin.
  - Freedom Bell installed in city hall of West Berlin.
- 1951
  - 11 January: Landtag (parliament) of West Berlin established.
  - 6–17 June: Berlin International Film Festival begins in West Berlin.
  - 27 July: Ernst Thälmann Pioneer Park opened.
  - 3 August: Stalin Statue (Berlin) dedicated.
  - 31 December: Population: 3,351,865.
  - East Berlin hosts 3rd World Festival of Youth and Students.
  - Berliner Festspiele established in West Berlin.
- 1952
  - Deutsche Waggon und Maschinenfabrik in business.
  - 1 May: Hochhaus an der Weberwiese completed.
  - 20 February: Knaack club opened.
  - 1 October: Friedrich-Ludwig-Jahn-Sportpark opened.
  - 31 December: Population: 3,374,178.
- 1953
  - June: Uprising in East Berlin.
  - 31 December: Population: 3,367,406.
- 1954
  - 25 January – 18 February: Berlin Conference (1954) held.
  - 10 September: Amerika-Gedenkbibliothek opened.
  - 31 December: Population: 3,350,957.
  - Academy of Arts established in West Berlin.
  - SC Dynamo Berlin founded.
- 1955
  - 2 July: Tierpark Berlin opened.
  - 31 December: Population: 3,343,182.
  - Radrennbahn Weissensee cycling track opened.
- 1956
  - 3 May:
    - Afrikanische Straße (Berlin U-Bahn) station opened.
    - Kurt-Schumacher-Platz (Berlin U-Bahn) station opened.
    - Rehberge (Berlin U-Bahn) station opened.
  - 3 June: Plänterwald railway station opened.
  - 31 December: Population: 3,345,650.
  - Westhafen Canal opened.
  - Rotes Rathaus reconstructed; becomes city hall of East Berlin.
- 1957
  - 31 December: Population: 3,338,561.
  - International Building Exposition held.
  - Haus der Kulturen der Welt built in West Berlin.
- 1958
  - 31 May:
    - Alt-Tegel (Berlin U-Bahn) station opened.
    - Borsigwerke (Berlin U-Bahn) station opened.
    - Holzhauser Straße (Berlin U-Bahn) station opened.
    - Otisstraße (Berlin U-Bahn) station opened.
    - Scharnweberstraße (Berlin U-Bahn) station opened.
  - 31 December: Population: 3,316,353.
  - Bundesautobahn 100 opened.
- 1959
  - 2 June: Spichernstraße (Berlin U-Bahn) station opened.
  - 31 December: Population: 3,290,333.
  - Institute for European Politics founded in West Berlin.
  - Jüdisches Gemeindehaus Fasanenstraße (Jewish centre) inaugurated in West Berlin.
- 1960
  - 31 December: Population: 3,274,016.
  - Gropiusstadt developed.
- 1961
  - 28 January: Birkenstraße (Berlin U-Bahn) station opened.
  - 8 May: Augsburger Straße (Berlin U-Bahn) station opened.
  - 4 June: Berlin Crisis of 1961 begins.
  - 13–15 August: Berlin Wall construction begins between East Berlin and West Berlin.
  - 19–20 August: U.S. vice president Lyndon B. Johnson visits West Berlin
  - 28 August:
    - Amrumer Straße (Berlin U-Bahn) station opened.
    - Hansaplatz (Berlin U-Bahn) station opened.
    - Kurfürstendamm (Berlin U-Bahn) station opened.
    - Leopoldplatz U9 platform opened.
    - Spichernstraße U9 platform opened.
    - Turmstraße (Berlin U-Bahn) station opened.
    - Berlin Westhafen station station opened.
    - Berlin Zoologischer Garten U9 platform opened.
  - 27–28 October: U.S.–Soviet confrontation at Checkpoint Charlie.
  - 31 December: Population: 3,252,691.
  - Max Planck Institute for Human Development established.
  - Ampelmännchen pedestrian signal introduced in East Berlin.
- 1962
  - 27 May: Grünbergallee station opened.
  - 17 August: Killing of Peter Fechter at the Berlin Wall by East German border guards.
  - 31 December: Population: 3,235,231.
- 1963
  - 5 May: Maria Regina Martyrum consecrated.
  - 26 June: U.S. president Kennedy gives Ich bin ein Berliner speech in West Berlin.
  - 28 September:
    - Blaschkoallee (Berlin U-Bahn) station opened.
    - Parchimer Allee (Berlin U-Bahn) station opened.
  - 29 September: Britz-Süd (Berlin U-Bahn) station opened.
  - 15 October: Berliner Philharmonie opened.
  - 15 November: Kino International opened.
  - 31 December: Population: 3,251,489.
  - Berliner Philharmonie (concert hall) built in West Berlin.
  - Berliner Singakademie founded in East Berlin.
  - Hotel Berolina opened.
  - Wellblechpalast opened.
  - Biotronik founded.
- 1964
  - 18 July: Fernmeldeturm Berlin in service.
  - 31 December: Population: 3,270,959.
  - Old Palace rebuilt.
  - Prinzessinnenpalais rebuilt.
  - JazzFest Berlin begins in West Berlin.
- 1965
  - 2 April: Europa-Center inaugurated.
  - 31 December: Population: 3,274,500.
- 1966
  - 28 February:
    - Alt-Mariendorf (Berlin U-Bahn) station opened.
    - Alt-Tempelhof (Berlin U-Bahn) station opened.
    - Kaiserin-Augusta-Straße (Berlin U-Bahn) station opened.
    - Möckernbrücke U7 platform opened.
    - Ullsteinstraße (Berlin U-Bahn) station opened.
    - Westphalweg (Berlin U-Bahn) station opened.
  - May: Zentraler Omnibusbahnhof Berlin opened.
  - 17 September: Deutsche Film- und Fernsehakademie Berlin founded.
  - 31 December: Population: 3,265,398.
  - Prussian Heritage Image Archive established.
- 1967
  - 2 June: Death of Benno Ohnesorg.
  - 15 September: Brücke Museum opened.
  - 31 December: Population: 3,245,325.
  - Strausberger Platz built.
  - Sister city relationship established with Los Angeles, USA.
- 1968
  - 11 April: Josef Bachmann's assassination attempt against Rudi Dutschke.
  - 31 December: Population: 3,225,354.
  - New National Gallery opens in West Berlin.
- 1969
  - 30 September: World Clock (Alexanderplatz) opened.
  - 3 October: Fernsehturm Berlin (TV tower) erected in East Berlin.
  - 31 December: Population: 3,218,112.
  - Neuer Berliner Kunstverein founded.
  - Kulturpark Plänterwald opened.
- 1970
  - 2 January:
    - Johannisthaler Chaussee (Berlin U-Bahn) station opened.
    - Lipschitzallee (Berlin U-Bahn) station opened.
    - Wutzkyallee (Berlin U-Bahn) station opened.
    - Zwickauer Damm (Berlin U-Bahn) station opened.
  - 7 October: Hotel Stadt Berlin built in East Berlin.
  - 31 December: Population: 3,208,719.
  - Protestant Church of Plötzensee inaugurated.
- 1971
  - 29 January:
    - Bayerischer Platz U7 platform opened.
    - Berliner Straße (Berlin U-Bahn) station opened.
    - Blissestraße (Berlin U-Bahn) station opened.
    - Berlin Bundesplatz U-Bahn station opened
    - Eisenacher Straße station opened
    - Fehrbelliner Platz U7 platform opened.
    - Friedrich-Wilhelm-Platz (Berlin U-Bahn) station opened.
    - Güntzelstraße (Berlin U-Bahn) station opened.
    - Kleistpark (Berlin U-Bahn) station opened.
    - Walther-Schreiber-Platz (Berlin U-Bahn) station opened.
    - Berlin Yorckstraße U7 platform opened.
  - 4 December: Georg von Rauch shot and killed during arrest by West Berlin police.
  - 31 December: Population: 3,172,902.
  - 2 June Movement anarchist group active in West Berlin.
- 1972
  - 15 May: Memorial to Polish Soldiers and German Anti-Fascists dedicated.
  - 3 June: Four Power Agreement on Berlin in force.
  - 1 July: Rudow (Berlin U-Bahn) station opened.
  - 21 December: Basic Treaty, 1972 signed.
  - 31 December: Population: 3,152,489.
  - Kunstbibliothek Berlin opened.
- 1973
  - 25 June: Tierpark (Berlin U-Bahn) station opened.
  - 31 December: Population: 3,136,776.
  - Großgaststätte Ahornblatt (restaurant) built in East Berlin.
- 1974
  - 30 September:
    - Berlin Rathaus Steglitz U-Bahn station opened.
    - Schloßstraße (Berlin U-Bahn) station opened.
  - 13 October: Berlin Marathon begins in West Berlin.
  - 31 December: Population: 3,118,134.
- 1975
  - 31 December: Population: 3,083,011.
  - Berlinische Galerie opened.
  - Hochschule der Künste Berlin (art school) formed.
  - Peter Lorenz becomes president of the Landtag of West Berlin.
- 1976
  - 23 April: Palace of the Republic inaugurated.
  - 30 April:
    - Nauener Platz (Berlin U-Bahn) station opened.
    - Osloer Straße (Berlin U-Bahn) U9 station opened.
  - 13 October: Bierpinsel opened.
  - 30 December: Berlin Springpfuhl station opened.
  - 31 December: Population: 3,056,973.
- 1977
  - 5 October:
    - Osloer Straße U8 platform opened.
    - Pankstraße (Berlin U-Bahn) station opened.
  - 31 December: Population: 3,044,968.
- 1978
  - 28 April:
    - Adenauerplatz (Berlin U-Bahn) station opened.
    - Bismarckstraße (Berlin U-Bahn) station opened.
    - Konstanzer Straße (Berlin U-Bahn) station opened.
    - Wilmersdorfer Straße (Berlin U-Bahn) station opened.
  - July: Air Berlin established.
  - 31 December: Population: 3,038,689.
  - Berlin Motor Show begins in West Berlin.
  - Berlin State Library building opens on Haus Potsdamer Straße in West Berlin.
- 1979
  - 5 March: BESSY founded.
  - 2 April: Internationales Congress Centrum Berlin opened.
  - 31 December: Population: 3,042,504.
  - Teufel Audio company founded.
- 1980
  - 1 May: Tempodrom opened.
  - 1 October:
    - Halemweg (Berlin U-Bahn) station opened.
    - Jakob-Kaiser-Platz (Berlin U-Bahn) station opened.
    - Berlin Jungfernheide U7 station opened.
    - Mierendorffplatz (Berlin U-Bahn) station opened.
    - Rohrdamm (Berlin U-Bahn) station opened.
    - Siemensdamm (Berlin U-Bahn) station opened.
  - Islamische Föderation Berlin founded.
  - Memorial to the German Resistance erected.
  - 15 December:
    - Mehrower Allee station opened.
    - Raoul-Wallenberg-Straße station opened.
  - 31 December: Population: 3,048,759.
- 1981
  - 20 November: Western entrance to Teltow Canal reopened.
  - 31 December: Population: 3,050,974.
  - AG Märkische Kleinbahn established.
- 1982
  - 15 January: 1982 Berlin restaurant bombing.
  - 31 December: Population: 3,042,612.
- 1983
  - 12 August: Weltkugelbrunnen opened.
  - 25 August: Bombing of French consulate in West Berlin.
  - 26 September: IAV founded.
  - 31 December: Population: 3,040,035.
  - German Museum of Technology opened.
  - Berliner Rock- und Pop-Archiv founded.
- 1984
  - 9 February: Eberhard Diepgen becomes mayor of West Berlin.
  - 1 October:
    - Altstadt Spandau (Berlin U-Bahn) station opened.
    - Haselhorst (Berlin U-Bahn) station opened.
    - Paulsternstraße (Berlin U-Bahn) station opened.
    - Rathaus Spandau (Berlin U-Bahn) station opened.
    - Zitadelle (Berlin U-Bahn) station opened.
  - 20 December: Berlin-Hohenschönhausen station opened.
  - 31 December: Population: 3,045,456.
- 1985
  - 31 December: Population: 3,075,670.
  - West Berlin hosts Bundesgartenschau (garden show).
  - ESCP Europe school moves to Berlin.
- 1986
  - 1 January: Deutsches Herzzentrum Berlin opened.
  - 5 April: West Berlin discotheque bombing.
  - 31 December: Population: 3,115,473.
- 1987
  - 750th anniversary of founding of Berlin celebrated.
  - Topography of Terror exhibit opens.
  - 27 April:
    - Franz-Neumann-Platz (Berlin U-Bahn) station opened.
    - Paracelsus-Bad (Berlin U-Bahn) station opened.
    - Residenzstraße (Berlin U-Bahn) station opened.
  - 1 May: May Day in Kreuzberg begins.
  - 12 June: U.S. president Reagan gives Tear down this wall! speech in West Berlin.
  - 31 December: Population: 3,273,630.
- 1988
  - 31 March – 2 April: Four Nations Tournament (1988).
  - 1 July:
    - Biesdorf-Süd (Berlin U-Bahn) station opened.
    - Elsterwerdaer Platz (Berlin U-Bahn) station opened.
  - 31 December: Population: 3,352,848.
  - West Berlin designated a European Capital of Culture.
  - 1988 IMF/World Bank protests.
  - Metropol Verlag founded.

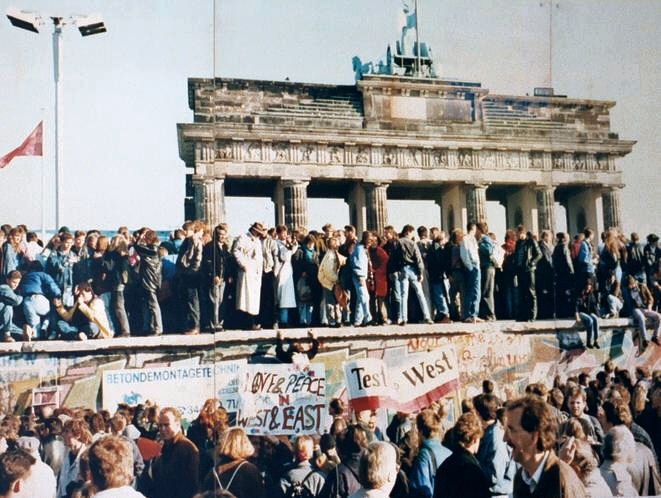
Fall of the Berlin Wall

- 1989
  - Population: 1,279,212 in East Berlin.
  - 1 July:
    - Cottbusser Platz (Berlin U-Bahn) station opened.
    - Hellersdorf (Berlin U-Bahn) station opened.
    - Hönow (Berlin U-Bahn) station opened.
    - Kaulsdorf-Nord (Berlin U-Bahn) station opened.
    - Louis-Lewin-Straße (Berlin U-Bahn) station opened.
    - Kienberg (Gärten der Welt) (Berlin U-Bahn) station opened.
    - Berlin Wuhletal station opened.
  - 7 October: Demonstrations in East Berlin.
  - 4 November: Alexanderplatz demonstration in East Berlin.
  - 9 November: Berlin Wall opened between East Berlin and West Berlin.
  - 31 December: Population: 3,409,737.

=== 1990s ===
- 1990
  - 19 March: Deutsche Kreditbank direct bank founded.
  - 13 June: Demolition of the Berlin wall begins.
  - 1 August: Most roads between West and East Berlin rebuilt and reopened.
  - 28 September: East Side Gallery opened.
  - 3 October: German reunification; unified Berlin designated capital of the Federal Republic of Germany.
  - 7 November: Stasi Museum opened.
  - 1 December: Schichauweg railway station opened.
  - 31 December: Population: 3,433,695.
  - Federal Commissioner for the Stasi Records and German Academy for Urban and Regional Spatial Planning headquartered in Berlin.
  - Kunsthaus Tacheles established.
- 1991
  - 20 June: Decision on the Capital of Germany.
  - 4 July: Alba Berlin founded.
  - 31 December: Population: 3,446,031.
- 1992
  - 1 January: Weierstrass Institute established.
  - 17 September: Mykonos restaurant assassinations.
  - 31 December: Population: 3,456,891.
  - A-Trane club opened.
- 1993
  - 1 October: West and East Berlin Academy of Arts merged.
  - 31 December: Population: 3,461,421.
  - Max Planck Institute for Infection Biology established.
  - Berlin Cathedral renovated.
  - Transparency International headquartered in city.
  - Magix founded.
  - Japanische Internationale Schule zu Berlin established.
- 1994
  - March: Max Planck Institute for the History of Science established.
  - 26 April: Berlin-Bonn Act.
  - 9 September: Russian and Allied forces depart.
  - 24 September:
    - Berlin Karl-Bonhoeffer-Nervenklinik U-Bahn station opened.
    - Lindauer Allee (Berlin U-Bahn) station opened.
    - Rathaus Reinickendorf (Berlin U-Bahn) station opened.
    - Berlin-Wittenau U-Bahn station opened.
  - 31 December: Population: 3,452,284.
  - Berlin-Hohenschönhausen Memorial opened.
  - Berlin British School founded.
- 1995
  - 17 January: Die Pyramide completed.
  - 10 May: German-Russian Museum opens.
  - June: Artist Christo wraps the Reichstag.
  - 31 December: Population: 3,446,039.
  - Berlin Central and Regional Library opened.
- 1996
  - 13 July: Berlin Hermannstraße U-Bahn station opened.
  - 13 December: Max-Schmeling-Halle opened.
  - 31 December: Population: 3,428,644.
  - Crown Prince Bridge rebuilt.
  - City website online (approximate date).
  - Berggruen Museum and Café Einstein Unter den Linden open.
- 1997
  - 5 September: Velodrom arena opened.
  - December: Propeller Island City Lodge founded.
  - 31 December: Population: 3,387,901.
  - Computer Games Museum founded.
- 1998
  - 20 May: Treptowers opened.
  - 12 June: Gemäldegalerie opened.
  - 25 September: Osdorfer Straße station opened.
  - 2 October: Mendelssohn-Bartholdy-Park (Berlin U-Bahn) station opened.
  - 31 December: Population: 3,358,235.
  - Allied Museum opened.
- 1999
  - 17 February: 1999 Israeli consulate attack in Berlin.
  - 19 April: German Bundestag (legislature) relocated to Berlin from Bonn per Berlin-Bonn Act.
  - 31 December: Population: 3,340,887.
  - Molecule Man (sculpture) installed in the Spree River.
  - Clocktower reinstalled on Potsdamer Platz.
- 2000
  - 14 June: Sony Center opened.
  - 31 December: Population: 3,331,232.
  - Bahntower built.

== 21st century ==
- 2001
  - February: Anhalter Steg bridge built.
  - 2 May: Federal Chancellery (Berlin) completed.
  - 16 June: Klaus Wowereit becomes governing mayor.
  - 9 September: Jewish Museum, Berlin opened.
  - 21 October: Berlin state election, 2001.
  - 31 December: Population: 3,337,232.
  - Merger of boroughs: Charlottenburg-Wilmersdorf, Friedrichshain-Kreuzberg, Marzahn-Hellersdorf, Steglitz-Zehlendorf, Tempelhof-Schöneberg, and Treptow-Köpenick formed.
  - DZ Bank building constructed.
  - Jewish Museum opens.
  - Berlin International Literature Festival begins.
- 2002
  - 31 December: Population: 3,336,248.
  - SRH Hochschule Berlin established.
  - Berlin Philharmonic Chamber Orchestra founded.
  - Exberliner English-language magazine founded.
- 2003
  - 2 December: AquaDom opened.
  - 31 December: Population: 3,330,242.
- 2004
  - 1 January: Federal Joint Committee health agency established.
  - May: Badeschiff opened.
  - 3 June: Museum of Photography, Berlin opened.
  - 9 December: University Library of the TU Berlin and UdK opened.
  - 31 December: Population: 3,333,108.
  - Festival of Lights begins.
- 2005
  - 7 February: Honor killing of Hatun Sürücü.
  - 24 February: Berlin-Lichterfelde Süd–Teltow Stadt railway opened.
  - 10 May: Memorial to the Murdered Jews of Europe unveiled.
  - 30 June: Gustav Heinemann Bridge opened.
  - 31 December: Population: 3,339,436.
  - Philological Library opened.
  - Transradio founded.
- 2006
  - February: Institute for Media and Communication Policy.
  - 26 May: Berlin Hauptbahnhof (Central station) constructed.
  - 27 May: Berlin North–South mainline opened.
  - 9 July: FIFA World Cup Final held at Olympiastadion.
  - 15 July: DDR Museum opened.
  - 17 September: Berlin state election, 2006.
  - 31 December: Population: 3,348,805.
  - Türk Bakım Evi nursing home established.
- 2007
  - July: Berlin Fashion Week first held.
  - 12 September: Alexa Centre shopping mall opened.
  - 31 December: Population: 3,353,858.
  - Rocket Internet founded.
- 2008
  - July: Scharf-Gerstenberg Collection opened.
  - 10 September: Mercedes-Benz Arena (Berlin) opened.
  - 1 October: BMG Rights Management founded.
  - October: Zalando founded.
  - 16 October: Khadija Mosque opened.
  - 31 December: Population: 3,362,843.
- 2009
  - 8 August:
    - U55 (Berlin U-Bahn) line opened.
    - Bundestag (Berlin U-Bahn) station opened.
    - Berlin Hauptbahnhof U55 platforms opened.
  - 15–23 August: 2009 World Championships in Athletics held.
  - 16 October: Neues Museum reopened.
  - 31 December: Population: 3,369,672.
  - International Psychoanalytic University Berlin founded.
  - Prinzessinnengärten (garden) created.
- 2010 – 31 December: Population: 3,387,562.
- 2011
  - 29 June: Humboldt Box opened.
  - 18 September: Berlin state election, 2011.
  - 15 October: Occupy Berlin.
  - 31 December: Population: 3,427,114.
- 2012
  - March: Zoofenster high-rise completed.
  - 27 September: Rathaus Bridge inaugurated after rebuilding.
  - 31 December: Population: 3,469,621.
- 2013
  - 21 March: 2013 Berlin helicopter crash.
  - 2 June: Hohenzollern Stadtschloss (palace) reconstruction begins.
  - 3 November: Berlin energy referendum, 2013 held.
  - 15 November: Museum in the Kulturbrauerei opened.
  - 31 December: Population: 3,517,424.
  - N26 (bank) founded.
- 2014
  - March: .berlin internet domain name begins.
  - 28 August: 2014 Conference of Western Balkan States, Berlin held.
  - 25 September: Mall of Berlin opened.
  - 31 December: Population: 3,562,166.
  - Headquarters of the Federal Intelligence Service built.
- 2015
  - 7 February: Victoria released.
  - 31 December: Population: 3,610,156.
- 2016
  - July: Protest against gentrification in Friedrichshain.
  - 18 September: Berlin state election, 2016.
  - 1 December: Berlin Police Academy established.
  - 19 December: 2016 Berlin truck attack.
  - 31 December: Population: 3,670,622.
- 2017
  - 13 April: IGA Cable Car opened.
  - 13 October: Babylon Berlin TV series released.
  - 10 December: Berlin–Munich high-speed railway opened.
  - 31 December: Population: 3,711,930.
  - Urban Nation museum opens.
- 2018 – 31 December: Population: 3,748,148.
- 2022 - 8 June - 2022 Berlin car attack.
- 2024 - 14 July - UEFA Euro 2024 final
- 2026
  - 3 January: 2026 arson attack on the Berlin power grid.
  - 25 July: 2026 Berlin Pride attack

== See also ==
- History of Berlin
- List of governing mayors of Berlin

== Bibliography ==
=== Published in 17th-19th centuries ===
- "Berlin". Topographia Electoratus Brandenburgici et Ducatus Pomeraniae. Topographia Germaniae. 1652. 1652/1680
- Thomas Nugent (1749), "Berlin", The Grand Tour, vol. 2: Germany and Holland, London: S. Birt, hdl:2027/mdp.39015030762572
- "Berlin". A Geographical, Historical and Political Description of the Empire of Germany, Holland, the Netherlands, Switzerland, Prussia, Italy, Sicily, Corsica and Sardinia: With a Gazetteer. London: John Stockdale. 1800. OCLC 79519893.
- Abraham Rees (1819), "Berlin", The Cyclopaedia, London: Longman, Hurst, Rees, Orme & Brown
- John Russell (1828), "Berlin", A Tour in Germany, and Some of the Southern Provinces of the Austrian Empire, in 1820, 1821, 1822, Edinburgh: Constable, OCLC 614379840
- David Brewster, ed. (1830). "Berlin". Edinburgh Encyclopædia. Edinburgh: William Blackwood.
- Edward Augustus Domeier (1830), "Berlin", Descriptive Road-Book of Germany, London: Samuel Leigh, hdl:2027/hvd.hx167e
- Mariana Starke (1839), "Berlin", Travels in Europe (9th ed.), Paris: A. and W. Galignani
- Charles Knight, ed. (1866). "Berlin". Geography. English Cyclopaedia. Vol. 2. London: Bradbury, Evans, & Co. hdl:2027/nyp.33433000064786.
- Berlin and its Treasures. New York: D. Appleton and Company. 1867.
- George Henry Townsend (1867), "Berlin", A Manual of Dates (2nd ed.), London: Frederick Warne & Co.
- William Henry Overall, ed. (1870), "Berlin, Prussia", Dictionary of Chronology, London: William Tegg, hdl:2027/uc2.ark:/13960/t9m32q949, OCLC 2613202
- "Berlin", Northern Germany (5th ed.), Coblenz: Karl Baedeker, 1873, OCLC 5947482; famous guidebook
- "Berlin". Handbook for North Germany. London: J. Murray. 1877.
- Henry Vizetelly (1879), Berlin under the New Empire, London: Tinsley Bros., OCLC 1819784, OL 23280773M + v.2
- W. Pembroke Fetridge (1884), "Berlin", Harper's Hand-Book for Travellers in Europe and the East (23rd ed.), New York: Harper & Brothers, hdl:2027/nyp.33433066588363
- James Pollard (1894), A study in municipal government: the corporation of Berlin, Edinburgh: Blackwood, OL 7191669M
- Norddeutscher Lloyd (1896), "Berlin", Guide through Germany, Austria-Hungary, Italy, Switzerland, France, Belgium, Holland and England, Berlin: J. Reichmann & Cantor, OCLC 8395555
- "Berlin", Bradshaw's Illustrated Hand-book to Germany and Austria, London: W.J. Adams & Sons, 1898

=== Published in 20th century ===
in English

- Robert C. Brooks (1901), "Berlin", Bibliography of Municipal Problems and City Conditions, Municipal Affairs, vol. 5 (2nd ed.), New York: Reform Club, OCLC 1855351
- "Berlin". Chambers's Encyclopaedia. London. 1901.
- Berlin and its Environs (3rd ed.), Leipzig: Karl Baedeker, 1908, OCLC 00575650
- Phillips, Walter Alison (1910). "Berlin" . Encyclopædia Britannica. Vol. 3 (11th ed.). pp. 785–791.
- Benjamin Vincent (1910), "Berlin", Haydn's Dictionary of Dates (25th ed.), London: Ward, Lock & Co.
- Nathaniel Newnham Davis (1911), "Berlin", The Gourmet's Guide to Europe (3rd ed.), London: Grant Richards
- David C. Preyer (1912), The Berlin Galleries, Boston: St. Botolph Society, OCLC 3077308, OL 25070700M
- Joseph Lins (1913). "Berlin". Catholic Encyclopedia. New York.
- Leon E. Seltzer, ed. (1952), "Berlin", Columbia Lippincott Gazetteer of the World, New York: Columbia University Press, p. 203, OL 6112221M
- J.L. Simpson (1957). "Berlin: Allied Rights and Responsibilities in the Divided City". International and Comparative Law Quarterly. 6 (1): 83–102. doi:10.1093/iclqaj/6.1.83. JSTOR 755897.
- Wolfgang Hofmann (1969). "West Berlin – The Isolated City in the Twentieth Century". Journal of Contemporary History. 4 (3): 77–93. doi:10.1177/002200946900400305. JSTOR 259732. S2CID 154750065.
- Berlin, Great Cities, Time-Life Books, 1977, OL 3850712M
- T.H. Elkins; B. Hofmeister (1988), Berlin: the spatial structure of a divided city, London: Methuen, ISBN 0416922201
- David Stanley (1992), "Berlin", Eastern Europe (2nd ed.), Lonely Planet, p. 86+
- John Czaplicka (1995). "History, Aesthetics, and Contemporary Commemorative Practice in Berlin". New German Critique (65): 155–187. doi:10.2307/488540. JSTOR 488540.
- Trudy Ring, ed. (1995). "Berlin". Northern Europe. International Dictionary of Historic Places. Fitzroy Dearborn. ISBN 978-1-136-63944-9.
- Ronald Taylor (1997), Berlin and its culture, New Haven, Conn: Yale University Press, ISBN 0300072007
- Wolfgang Schivelbusch (1998), In a cold crater: cultural and intellectual life in Berlin, 1945–1948, Berkeley: University of California Press, ISBN 0520203666
- Evanovich, Janet (1999). "Berlin". Germany. Let's Go. St Martins Press. ISBN 9780312194833. OL 24980049M.

in German

- P. Krauss und E. Uetrecht, ed. (1913). "Berlin". Meyers Deutscher Städteatlas [Meyer's Atlas of German Cities] (in German). Leipzig: Bibliographisches Institut.
- Berlin. Griebens Reiseführer (in German). Berlin: Albert Goldschmidt. 1920 – via Internet Archive.

=== Published in 21st century ===
- Jack Holland (2001), Rough Guide to Berlin, Rough Guides, London, OL 24743282M
- Matt Erlin (2003), Berlin's Forgotten Future: City, History, and Enlightenment in Eighteenth-Century Germany, University of North Carolina Press, ISBN 9780807881279
- Florian Urban (2003). "Picture Postcards of Urbanity: Reflections on Berlin's Inner City and the 1999 Master Plan". Journal of Architectural Education. 57 (1): 68–73. doi:10.1162/104648803322336601. JSTOR 1425741. S2CID 109813934.
- Hartmut Haussermann (2004). "Berlin: from divided into fragmented city". Greek Review of Social Research.
- Gösta Arvastson; Tim Butler, eds. (2006). "Shopping Malls and Shishas ... Berlin and Moscow". Multicultures and Cities. Museum Tusculanum Press. ISBN 978-87-635-0372-3.
- Christian Hartel (2006). Berlin: a Short History.
- Daum, Andreas W. (2008). Kennedy in Berlin. New York: Cambridge University Press. ISBN 978-0-521-85824-3.
- Davis, Belinda (2008). "City as theater of protest: West Berlin and West Germany, 1962-83". In Gyan Prakash and Kevin Michael Kruse (ed.). Spaces of the Modern City: Imaginaries, Politics, and Everyday Life. Princeton University Press. ISBN 978-0-691-13343-0.
- Joachim Schlör (2010). "Berlin 1900". In Christian Hermansen Cordua (ed.). Manifestoes and Transformations in the Early Modernist City. Ashgate Publishing. ISBN 978-0-7546-7948-6.
- Agata Anna Lisiak (2010). Urban Cultures in (Post)colonial Central Europe. Purdue University Press. ISBN 978-1-55753-573-3. (about Berlin, Budapest, Prague, Warsaw)
- Daniel A. Bell; Avner de-Shalit (2011), "Berlin", Spirit of Cities: Why the Identity of a City Matters in a Global Age, Princeton, New Jersey: Princeton University Press, ISBN 9780691151441
- Roman A. Cybriwsky (2013). "Berlin". Capital Cities around the World: An Encyclopedia of Geography, History, and Culture. ABC-CLIO. p. 48+. ISBN 978-1-61069-248-9.
- Stephen Evans (7 January 2014). "Berlin 1914: A city of ambition and self-doubt". BBC News.
- Quinn Slobodian; Michelle Sterling (2014), "Sacking Berlin", The Baffler, no. 23, USA
- "36 Hours in Berlin", New York Times, 12 August 2015
