= A Protocol of 1919 =

Fabricated antisemitic text

A Protocol of 1919 is a fabricated text published as an appendix in some editions of The Protocols of the Elders of Zion. It was purportedly found on 9 December 1919 among the documents of a Jewish Red battalion commander killed in the Estonian War of Independence. The document's supposed authors, the "Israelite International League", gloat over their success at reducing the Russian people to "helpless slaves", and urge their fellow Jews to "excite hatred" and "buy up Government loans and gold", in order to grow in "political and economic power and influence". The text has been cited, as with other antisemitic canards, as evidence for the antisemitic belief that the Jews are conspiring to take over the world.

== History ==
A Protocol of 1919 was first published in the Estonian newspaper Postimees (morning edition) on 31 December 1919. Postimees detailed how the originally Hebrew text was found from the pocket of Shunderev, a Jewish Bolshevik battalion commander in the 11th Rifle Regiment who had been killed in action on the night before 9 December. At the time, Postimees was owned by Jaan Tõnisson, an Estonian nationalist politician.

The text appeared next on 5 February 1920 in Prizyv, a Russian newspaper in Berlin. Prizvy described it as "an interesting document". Later it was reproduced in the appendix of a greatly expanded English-language edition of The Protocols of the Elders of Zion, published in 1934 by the Patriotic Publishing Co., operating from a post office box in Chicago, Illinois.

Walter Laqueur, an American historian, states that "the German right-wing extremist press was supplied for years with information first published in Prizyv during its nine months of existence", and points to A Protocol of 1919 as a "typical" example.

== Content ==
The document consists of eleven short paragraphs of vague antisemitic generalizations, with eight admonitions to be "careful" or "cautious", and is signed by "The Central Committee of the Petersburg Branch of the Israelite International League".
