= Französisches Komödienhaus =

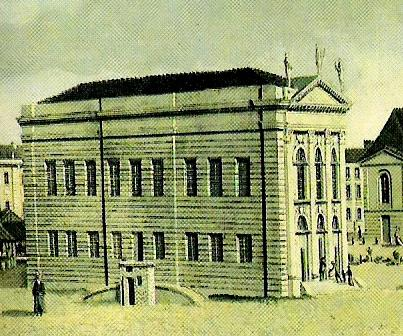
An image of Französisches Komödienhaus

The Französisches Komödienhaus or French Comedy House, was a theater in Berlin, active between 1774 and 1801.

Prior to 1742, Berlin was visited by travelling theater companies but had no permanent theater, until an opera house was founded by Frederick the Great that year. The opera house was only used by Italian opera performers, and there were plans to found a theater house for French language stage actors as well. A German language theater house, Döbbelinsches Theater, was active in the city from 1764, but French theater was the fashion and preferred by the monarch. The plans where finally realized in 1774 and the French theater was inaugurated in 1776. The French theater was primarily frequented by the nobility and royal court and much favored by the king. While its main rival, the German language Döbbelinsches Theater, was given no financial support at all by the king, he financed the French theater to great costs. In 1786, the successor of Frederick the Great, Frederick William II of Prussia, named the German language theater as royal theater and gave the localities of the former French theater to them, which was the beginning of a great age for German language theater in Berlin.
