= Schwimmhalle Finckensteinallee =

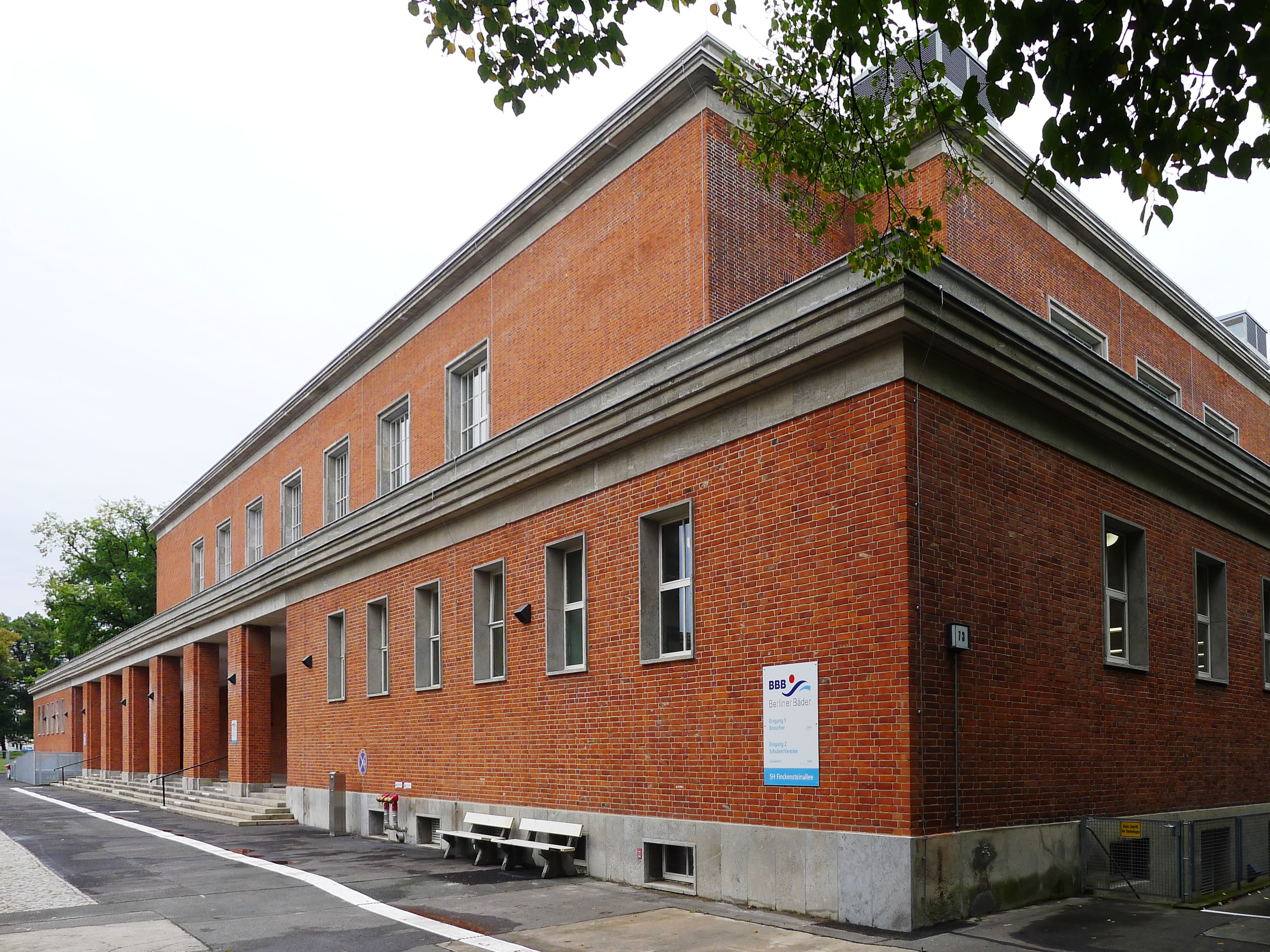
- Schwimmhalle Finckensteinallee

- Location within Berlin

General information
- Location: Berlin-Lichterfelde, Finckensteinallee 73
- Coordinates: 52.431876°N 13.297780°E
- Completed: 1937/1938

Design and construction
- Architects: Karl Reichle, Karl Badberger, Wilhelm Weigandt

The Schwimmhalle Finckensteinallee, an indoor swimming pool in Berlin's Finckensteinallee was completed in 1938 as a training facility for the SS regiment Leibstandarte Adolf Hitler. An outstanding example of architecture from the National Socialist era, it was used by the American military from 1945 to 1994. Due to its historical and architectural significance, the building received listed building protection in 2001. After being comprehensively restored between 2008 and 2014, its doors were opened to the public in August 2014, since which the pool has been used by schools and clubs and for sports events. The pool is located in the Lichterfelde district of Berlin.

== History ==
The indoor pool was built on land belonging to the former Prussian Central Cadet School (at Finckensteinallee 63–97) as part of its expansion for use by the SS regiment Leibstandarte Adolf Hitler. In keeping with the importance accorded to swimming for the training of SS recruits, from the outset, the building was conceived as an expensive architectural showpiece. The pool was designed by the secret state councillor Karl Reichle in cooperation with undersecretary Karl Badberger, both of the Third Reich's Ministry of Finance.

Once completed, the pool complex ranked among the largest and most modern in Europe. The pool itself was 50 metres long and 25 metres wide. With a depth of between 2.5 and 4.8 metres, it was equipped with a 10-metre-high diving platform. One special design feature was the skylight which spanned the entire ceiling above the pool. The building has two entrance portals, each flanked by a pair of larger-than-life statues of archetypal National Socialist style idealising the sexes.

While the barracks in Finckensteinallee suffered major bomb damage during the Second World War, the swimming pool itself suffered only minor roof damage. In 1945 the site was taken over by the American military. Renamed Andrews barracks, it was enlarged into a military headquarters for the American Sector in West Berlin. After prolonged disuse, the swimming pool was pressed back into service in 1954. Prior to this, the technical facilities were updated and modifications made to the hall's interior. In the early 1970s, the swimming hall's glass roof was replaced by a solid lead roof, its transparent ceiling being replaced by an opaque acoustic layer. At the same time, the hall's fenestration was drastically simplified.

Following the departure of the US military in 1994, the pool was once again opened to the public, but was forced to close for frequent repairs due to structural defects.

Between 2008 and 2014, the complex underwent comprehensive restoration, jointly funded by the Berlin Senate and EU, which together provided around 13 million Euros from the Senate's then Pool Restoration Programme and EU's Environmental Relief Programme (UEP II). Architect Nils Meyer of Veauthier Meyer Architekten, Berlin, led the concept and design for the project, with project management being undertaken by Tobias Reckert. The historically important elements of the building (façades, entrance areas, stairways, basic structures and historical surfaces) were preserved. The central swimming hall was returned to its original appearance, and functional areas brought up to date both technically and stylistically. The pool's complicated technical equipment was modernised. While the original dimensions of the pool were maintained in terms of length and width, its variable depth was replaced by a uniform depth of just two metres. With the ten-metre-high (33-foot) diving platform being rendered obsolete as a result, it was pulled down after extensive disputation, since stripped of its original function, its preservation would have been possible.

The indoor swimming pool in Finckensteinallee opened its doors to the public as a sports venue on 1 September 2014. Those regularly using the facilities include both the Steglitz and Zehlendorf Swimming Clubs.

== Description ==
The swimming hall has a ferro-concrete skeleton and is spanned by ferro-concrete trusses, with cladding on both its external and internal walls. The hall has a rectangular layout, with a raised central section flanked to the north and south by lower side wings. To the east is a broad entrance portal linking both main entrances, which are identical in appearance. The entire structure is built symmetrically, consisting of two vestibules, two large changing areas located in the low side wings and two sets of shower facilities in the passages leading to the pool hall, not to mention the two galleries to the north and south. Floor-to-ceiling windows are incorporated into the western side of the hall, the lower third of which originally could be opened to access the greenery outside. The interior of the hall has been restored with sgrafitto plasterwork, the lower areas being clad in restored panels of Trosselfels marble. For both budgetary and environmental reasons, the original transparent ceiling skylight could not be reconstructed. That being said, in terms of its outline and cubing, the restored ceiling was recreated to resemble the spatial impression of the original.

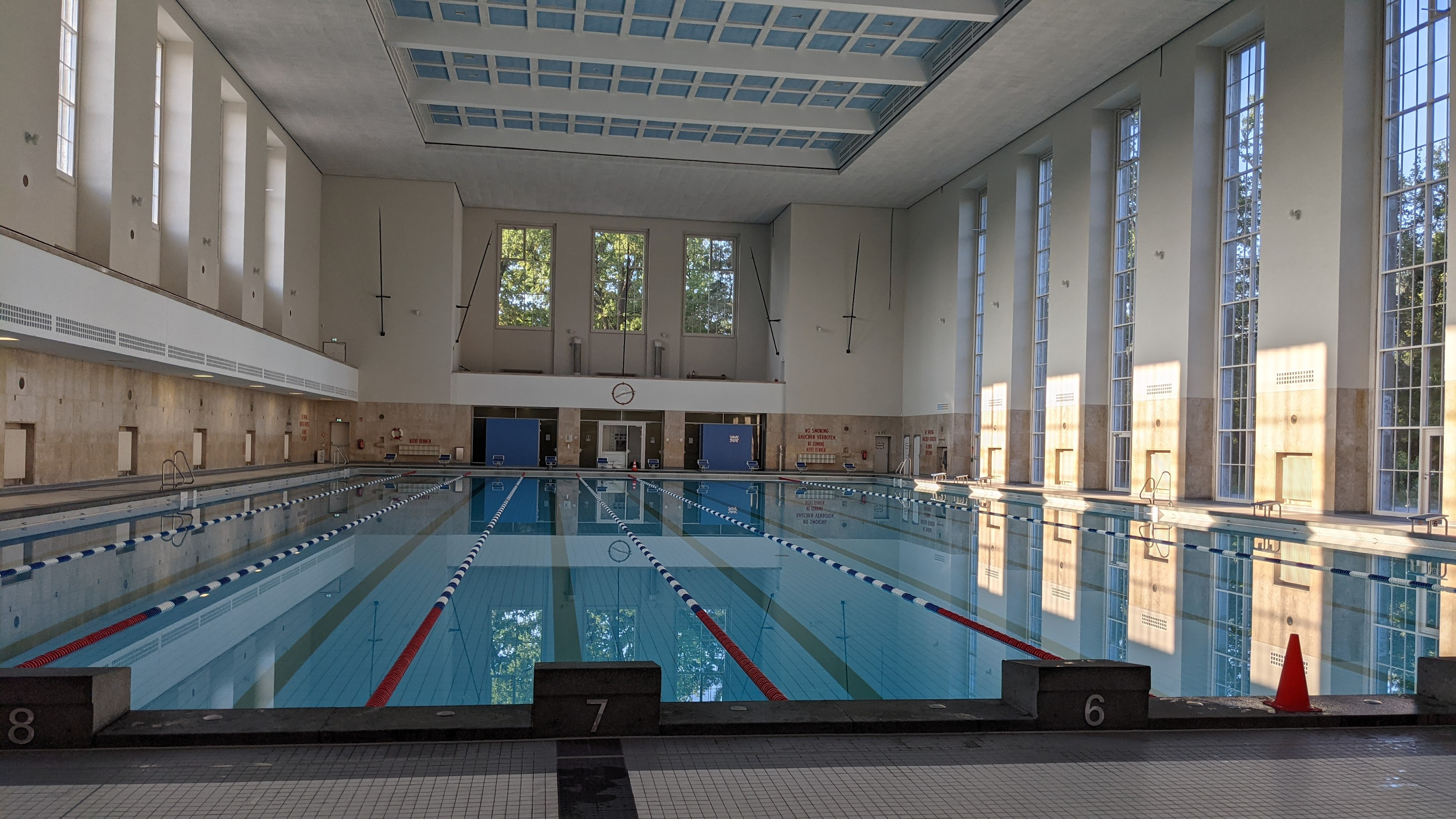
The inside of the pool is dominated by the huge windows.

The 50-metre-long pool has ten lengthwise lanes, each equipped with starter's podiums at either end. Additionally, there are twenty lanes widthwise. The modern pool has a volume of 2500 m^{3} (compared with 4000 m^{3} of the original) and is clad in white tiles. The pool is edged by small, coloured, anti-slip tiles resembling the original marble mosaic tiles. The preserved signs on the walls declaring "No running/Nicht rennen" and "No smoking/Rauchen verboten" serve as reminders of the pool's long use by the American military. Functional rooms such as showers and changing areas have been given a contrasting contemporary appearance. The vivid colour scheme, extending from the colourful shower cubicles all the way to the swimming hall itself, also serve as a means of orientation. The new additions to the fabric of the building have been designed so as to be both recognisable and reversible. The same holds true for the shower cubicles, the changing areas and front counters as well as the disabled ramp outside. Additional features such as a non-swimmer's pool, sauna or whirlpool have not been incorporated into the new complex.
