= Café Josty =

Café in Berlin, Germany

Coordinates: 52°30′36″N 13°22′25″E

Café Josty was a Berlin café located on Potsdamer Platz. At the beginning of 2001 a new Café Josty was opened at the Sony Center, not far from its original location; it no longer exists.

== History ==
=== Nineteenth century ===
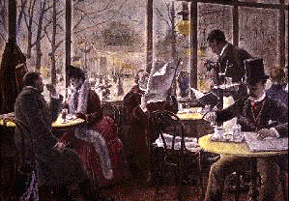
Paul Hoeniger: Im Café Josty, 1890

The Josty brothers immigrated from Sils in Switzerland to Berlin and founded the pastry bakery Zuckerbäckerei Johann Josty & Co. in 1796. From this company emerged the Café Josty, starting at least from 1812. First located on "An der Stechbahn", then on the Schlossfreiheit (now the Schlossplatz square), and finally after 1880, on the Potsdamer Platz.

The earlier addresses were frequented by artists like Heinrich Heine, Joseph von Eichendorff and the Grimm Brothers—and during the imperial times Theodor Fontane and Adolph von Menzel. In 1900, the Josty family sold the cafe to the widow of the founder of the Café Bauer. The Josty was modernized but retained its original name.

=== Twentieth century ===
In the twentieth century, the cafe became an important meeting place for artists, especially of the Expressionism and New Objectivity movements. Paul Boldt described the appearance of the cafe in a well-known 1912 sonnet.

Erich Kästner used the cafe as the setting for an important scene in the children's book Emil und die Detektive.

The cafe closed in 1930, and the building was destroyed during World War II. In Wim Wenders' film Wings of Desire, Homer, an old poet and storyteller played by Curt Bois, attempts to find the location of the cafe but fails.

== New Café Josty ==
The new Café Josty was located in the Sony-Center, only 200 meters away from its original location. It was a restaurant rather than a coffee house, and had nothing but the name in common with the old one; it no longer exists.

== See also ==
- Hotel Esplanade (Berlin)
