= Karl Badberger =

German architect

Karl Badberger (14 January 1888, in Munich – ??) was a German architect.

== Biography ==
Badberger graduated from the Technical University of Munich in 1911, became Regierungsbaumeister in 1919 and joined the Bayerische Staatsbauverwaltung (Bavarian State Construction Administration) in 1920. Afterwards, he served as a Ministerialrat at the Reichs Ministry of Finance in Berlin. After World War II, in the rank of an Oberregierungsbaudirektor, he led the Bundesbaudirektion (Federal Building Authority) in Bonn.

== Works (selection) ==
- 1922: war memorial of the former Bavarian railroad troops of World War I, Eisenbahnkaserne
- 1926–1928: Landesamt für Maß und Gewicht (regional office of measures and weights), Munich

== Publications ==
- Badberger, Karl: Das Münchener Kriegerdenkmal, in the Süddeutsche Baugewerkszeitung, 28. Jg., No. 8, 20. 4. 1925, pp. 105–108.
- Badberger, Karl: Bundeswohnungsbau in Bonn, in Die Bauverwaltung 1 (1952), pp. 87–91.

== Awards ==
- Order of Merit of the Federal Republic of Germany (1953)
- Order of St. Sylvester
