= Veritas AG =

German automotive parts manufacturer

Veritas
- Formerly: Veritas AG
- Type: Aktiengesellschaft
- ISIN: DE0007674004
- Industry: Automotive
- Founded: 1849 under the name "Berliner Gummiwaarenfabrik"
- Headquarters: Livonia, Michigan, USA
- Key people: Patrick Paige, President & CEO
- Operating income: 223.6 million euro (2011)
- Number of employees: 5,000 + (2026)
- Website: veritasauto.com

Veritas AG is an international, automotive corporation based in Gelnhausen, Germany, in the Main-Kinzig circle of the Hessen state. The family-owned company employs today over 4,300 people worldwide. In 2011 the turnover of the company was around €580 million.

== History ==
Veritas was founded in 1849 as Berliner Gummiwaarenfabrik (Rubberware Factory of Berlin) and is today the oldest rubber manufacturer in Germany. In 1883 the company signed a public stock and became Berliner Gummiwaarenfabrik AG.

In 1886 Berliner Gummiwaarenfabrik AG merged with Frankfurter Gummiwarenfabrik Wendt, Buchholz & Co., being the latter based in the city of Gelnhausen. The headquarters of the now Vereinigte Berlin-Frankfurter Gummiwaaren-Fabriken AG (United Rubber Factories of Berlin-Frankfurt) moved to Berlin, but a production plant remained in the Barbarossa street in Gelnhausen. In 1899 a fire burned down most of the production hall there at Gelnhausen.

In 1900 the Vereinigte Berlin-Frankfurter Gummiwaaren-Fabriken AG started to produce tires for automobiles. The corporation began to market tires; both with and without spikes, under the trade name Veritas. In 1905, these particular, spiked tires fitted with metal tacks, were a first-time; world novelty.

During the years before World War I, the corporation stood at its highest success levels. The company had grown into a large corporation, with two plants in Berlin, one in Gelnhausen, one in Bremen, as well as one in the then-Bohemian Grottau (what today is Hrádek nad Nisou). In 1929, and linking to the trade name of its successful tire, the corporation was renamed Veritas Gummiwerke AG (Veritas Rubber Works). The impact of the economic crisis of 1929 almost brought production to a halt. Only the operation at Hrádek nad Nisou, now in Czechoslovakia, was fully booked.

In 1933 the Berlin operation, in collaboration with the IG-Farben (Leverkusen) test laboratories, succeeded in introducing the synthetic rubber "Buna" for practical manufacture. The first innovation of the new material was the use in brake hoses for the German National Railway (Deutsche Reichsbahn).

The danger of a second world war moved the board of directors to abandon business in east-Europe. The Grottau operation was sold. That operation never generated a loss and was of great help for the whole corporation.

Because of the war, the management was moved from Berlin-Lichterfelde to Gelnhausen. Hence were the companies' archives rescued, because shortly after the move, the operation in Berlin-Lichterfelde was severely destroyed, as a result of the continuous air raids. The production buildings in Gelnhausen endured the war almost intact. Two years after the war ended, also the headquarters of the company were officially relocated from Berlin to the Gelnhausen works. Additionally, the war-winning forces' agreements kept Berlin away from west-Germany. The currency reforms brought new leverage and working enthusiasm in the Berlin and Gelnhausen works. However, the Berlin blockade put the plant there in raw material difficulties.

1955 presented excellent economical conditions. Veritas reinvested its profit and a generously equipped laboratory was erected in Gelnhausen. In the Veritas rubber facilities in Berlin and Gelnhausen, 700 workers and employees are active. 1968-69 came with an enormous economic upswing and the turn over grew 30% compared to the previous year.

From 1978 on, Veritas in Gelnhausen purchased land in the Stettiner Street, and began construction of a new production facility. Particularly for the manufacture of rubber hose, the old plant had become very small. The production at Berlin gradually moved to Gelnhausen. In 1982 the Berlin-Lichterfelde operation closed. With it, 133 years came to an end, an era that started with the founding of the first Rubber factory in Germany (1849) and the cornerstone of what today is Veritas AG. A year later, at the Gelnhausen site a new compounding plant - one of the most modern in Germany - started production. From 2008 on, this plant produced all compounds needed for the Veritas Group, including the affiliated Poppe Group.

The acquisition of the Ulrich Gummiwerke AG took place in 1986. With the purchase of additional land, plus that belonging to the Ulrich AG company, permitted a generous, long-term plan for the segmentation of operations within the corporation. In 1990 and with Veritas' sponsorship, the first German state-technical school for rubber and plastic opened in Gelnhausen.

Strong recessions of the automotive industry through 1992–1993 also led Veritas to considerable decline in revenue and new businesses. After 117 years; in 1993 and according to a plan, the old premises located in the Barbarossa street, were emptied.

In the late 20th and early 21st centuries, three new plants were established in Dunakiliti, Hungary (1995); Puebla, Mexico (1998); and Sarajevo, Bosnia and Herzegovina (2011), marking a period of strategic adaptation as the company sought stability and sustainability in lower-cost regions during times of market uncertainty.

The Poppe-Veritas Group entered insolvency in April 2019 following financial declines in 2018 and 2019, which were further exacerbated by the COVID-19 global pandemic.

=== Veritas Today ===
Veritas is a globally recognized automotive supplier with a heritage spanning nearly two centuries, known for its innovation, strength, and customer focus. The name Veritas is derived from the Latin word for truth, reflecting our shared values of precision, ingenuity, and engineering excellence.

With more than 5,000 employees at 14 locations in Africa, Asia, Europe and North America, the company stands for state-of-the-art cooling, fluid management and HVAC solutions made from rubber, plastic, aluminum and steel. Headquartered in Livonia, Michigan (USA), they are a leading Tier 1 supplier to the global top OEMs in the automotive space.

In 2024, HDT Automotive Solutions LLC acquired the majority of the assets of Veritas AG and integrated the two companies. Since 2025, the combined company has officially addressed the market under the unified brand name Veritas.

In 2026, the company expanded into Africa with the establishment of a manufacturing facility in Tangier, Morocco, its first facility on the continent.

== Expansion ==
In its systems portfolio, an important milestone came about with the purchase of a rubber facility in Rülzheim. With the establishment in 1995 of the Veritas Dunakility Kft in Hungary, Veritas took the first step to become a Global Player within the automotive industry. The plant is located in the tri-country corner of Hungary-Austria-Slovakia, not far from Vienna and Bratislava, at the Hungarian banks of the Danube. Three years later Veritas Thüringen (Thuringia) GmbH was founded in Benshausen. Right across the Highway from the Volkswagen Plant in Puebla, Mexico; and also in 1998 Automotive Veritas de México was established.

A long prepared step, that signalized the expansion of the product range and the core-competences, was taken in 1999: the corporation changed its name. This step towards modernization was the renaming, from Veritas Gummiwerke AG to Veritas AG. The expertise does not anymore lay solely on the manufacture of rubber articles. Plastic and metal components equally belong to the product assortment that Veritas, as a successful worldwide supplier of automotive systems, is reckoned with.

The internationalization of Veritas grew further in 2005, with the acquisition of PS Fertigungstechnik GmbH in Austrian Mieders, where metal products were made. The product portfolio was broadened: additional to rubber also plastic and metal were supplied as part of the systems. By 2008, close to Istanbul Veritas Otomotiv was founded, as an additional location for injection molding.

In 2010 Veritas acquired OGW - Ostsächsiche Gumiwerke Polenz GmbH in Neustadt, in the Saxony state. In 2012 this site was registered under the name Veritas Sachsen GmbH.

Current Veritas locations also include Veritas Automotive Systems, in Kunshan, China; as well as sales offices in Korea, Wolfsburg, and Troy, Michigan.
