= J. F. Schwarzlose Söhne =

J.F. Schwarzlose Söhne was a German perfume-manufacturer that operated from 1856 to 1976, with its heyday between about 1870 and the Second World War. It specialized in perfume but also sold powders, soaps and other toiletries. A new company was founded in 2012, as J.F. Schwarzlose Berlin, selling fragrances under some of the same historical brand names.

== History ==
In 1856, Joachim Friedrich Schwarzlose, a piano maker, founded the company J.F. Schwarzlose Söhne for his children Franz, Kurt, Max and Hedwig. The company was initially a pharmacy but two of the brothers, Kurt and Max, left the main business and came to specialize in the production of perfumes. The store was located at Markgrafenstraße 29 in Berlin. In 1895, J.F. Schwarzlose Söhne took over the distinguished fragrance manufacturer Treu & Nuglisch, which was founded in the 1820s and had been a purveyor to the Court, thus giving the company a good reputation among imperial and royal personages. From then on, business was done under the name of J.F. Schwarzlose Söhne – Treu & Nuglisch.

In 1902, Ernst Köthner, grandson of Joachim Friedrich Schwarzlose, became the owner and with him the company began to expand, from Europe to Asia and Australia. In 1922, Ernst Köthner and his wife, Hedwig Köthner, renamed the company J.F. Schwarzlose Söhne GmbH. The factory was located at 5 Dreysestraße in Moabit. In September 1930, they moved to a modernized store located at 113 Leipziger Straße. Two months later, in November 1930, Ernst Köthner died and his son Werner took over the company and became head of the company with his mother Hedwig Köthner.

After the factory and shops were destroyed in 1944, Anni Köthner restarted the business in 1947, first in Hamburg, then again in Berlin. Difficulties came with the building of the Berlin Wall in 1961, because offices in the districts of Prenzlauer Berg and Moabit and the shop in Leipziger Straße were separated by it. In 1965, Anni Müller-Godet – born Köthner – became the head of the company. In 1976, J. F. Schwarzlose Söhne was liquidated.

== Products ==
The fragrances that were popular included the floral "Rosa Centifolia" and "Hymen", a German bouquet-fantasy "Royalin", or masculine cologne "Finale". Between the First and Second World Wars, leather fragrances "Juchten" and "IA-33" (for women) were popular throughout Germany and Europe. The latter's unusual name derived from the vehicle license plate for Berlin at this time. The flacon was designed in the Art déco style and resembled a car radiator grill – a sign of the modern way of life in the intellectual and progressive capital. Other important products were "Treffpunkt 8 Uhr", "Hohenzollern Veilchen" and "Lilaflor".

== J.F. Schwarzlose Berlin ==
A new company was founded in 2012, under the name of J.F. Schwarzlose Berlin. The perfumer Véronique Nyberg (of International Flavors & Fragrances) and the designer Lutz Herrmann created four fragrances: floral linden fragrance "1A-33", spicy woody fragrance "Treffpunkt 8 Uhr", "Trance" and "Rausch". The first three use the names from the old company, and the fourth was new.
