= Georgenhospital =

German leper hospital

The Georgenhospital was a leper hospital established in Berlin in the thirteenth century. It was built outside the city, in Oderberg.

There is another hospital of the same name in Frankfurt (Oder).

There were many other St. Georgen hospitals in central and eastern German-speaking areas. They were always located outside the gates of medieval towns, mostly on important trade routes, and were originally leprosariums. They had buildings for the accommodation of the sick, a St. George's chapel and an enclosed cemetery. When the plague had disappeared, the hospitals were often used as poorhouses.
