= Anhalter Steg =

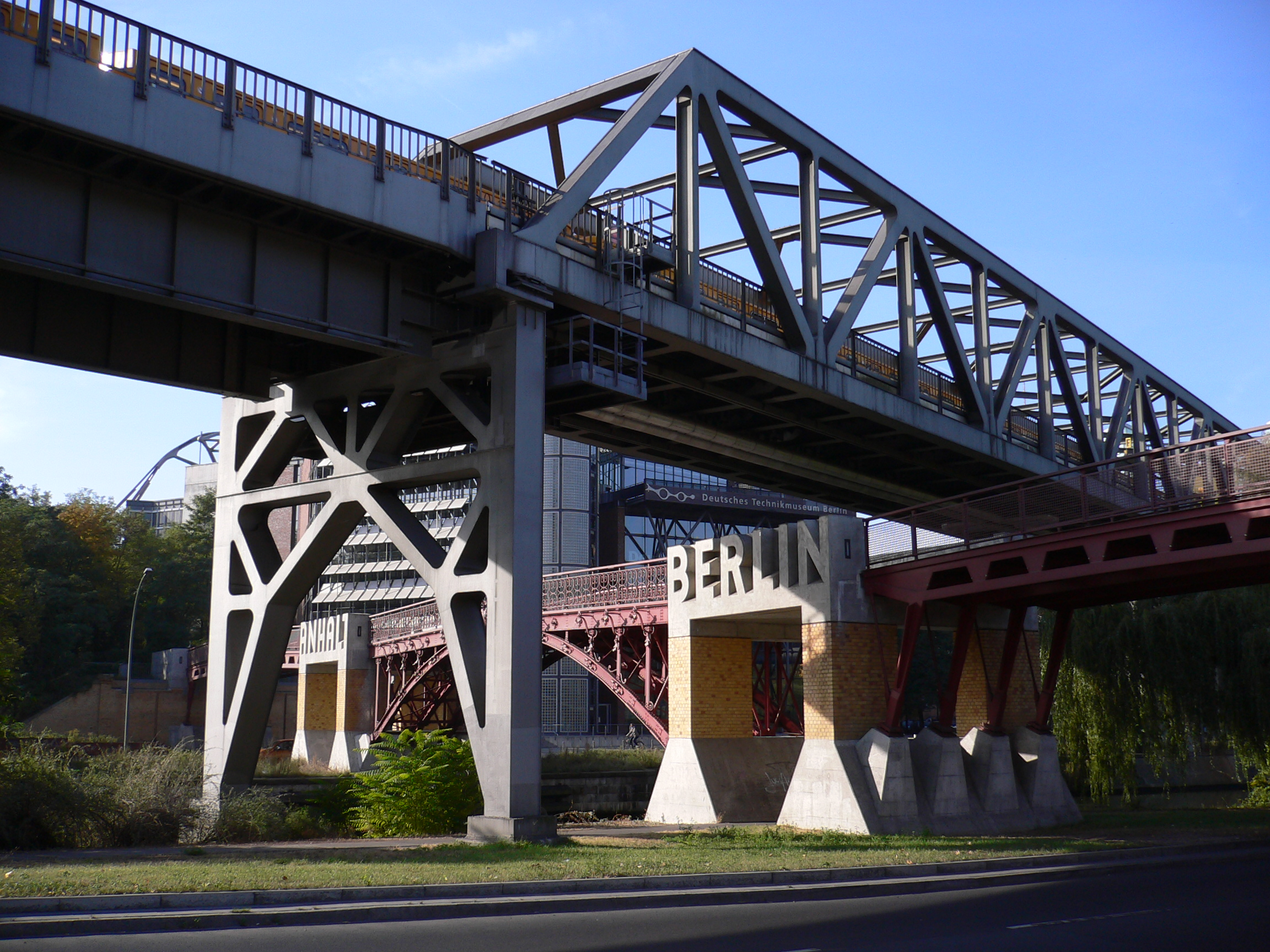
- The Anhalter Steg footbridge
- Coordinates: 52.4992°N 13.3789°E
- Carries: Pedestrians and cyclists
- Crosses: Landwehr Canal
- Locale: Kreuzberg, Berlin, Germany
- Begins: German Museum of Technology
- Ends: Hallesches Ufer
- Named for: Anhalter Bahnhof
- Preceded by: Möckern Bridge
- Followed by: Schöneberg Bridge

Characteristics
- Design: Arch bridge
- Material: Riveted cast iron, concrete and clinker brick (piers)
- Total length: 75 m
- Longest span: 25 m (central arch)
- No. of spans: 3

History
- Architect: Benedict Tonon
- Construction cost: €1.5m
- Opened: February 2001
- Replaces: Railway bridge from Anhalter Bahnhof

The Anhalter Steg is a footbridge over the Landwehr Canal between the Möckern and Schoneberg Bridges, in Kreuzberg, on the southern side of Berlin city centre. Opened in February 2001, it links the German Museum of Technology with the Hallesches Ufer. It rests on the foundations of the railway bridge leading south from the Anhalter Bahnhof, which was destroyed by bombing in World War II.

The Senate of Berlin laid plans for a cycle and footbridge on the site during the 1980s, but it was not built until the necessary €1.5m were made available by DaimlerChrysler Immobilien GmbH in exchange for permission to develop Potsdamer Platz. The first section was erected in September 2000.

The bridge was designed by the Berlin architect Benedict Tonon. It consists of three sections, each 25 metres long. The central arch, of riveted cast iron, is salvaged from the Marschallbrücke, which was rebuilt in the 1990s.

The concrete piers are clad in Berlin's traditional yellow clinker brick. In a nod to railway history, the concrete cap of the northern pier reads 'Berlin' and the southern 'Anhalt'.
