= Stadt und Land =

Agency overview
- Formed: 7 July 1924
- Type: GmbH
- Jurisdiction: Berlin, Germany
- Headquarters: Werbellinstraße 12, 12053 Berlin
- Employees: 528 (2014)
- Annual budget: €246.6 million (2014)
- Agency executive: Chair of the Supervisory Board, Dr Christoph Landerer
- Parent department: Government of Berlin
- Website: www.stadtundland.de

Stadt und Land Wohnbauten GmbH is a German state-owned public housing company which manages properties in Berlin and Brandenburg.

== Operations ==
The company was founded in 1924 and manages more than 42,000 residential apartments and 700 commercial properties. It also owns a further 9,000 residential apartments which are managed by third parties.

The company aims to ensure Berliners of all income levels are able to afford to live in the city.
