= Gustav Heinemann Bridge =

Bridge in Berlin, Germany

Gustav Heinemann Bridge Gustav-Heinemann-Brücke
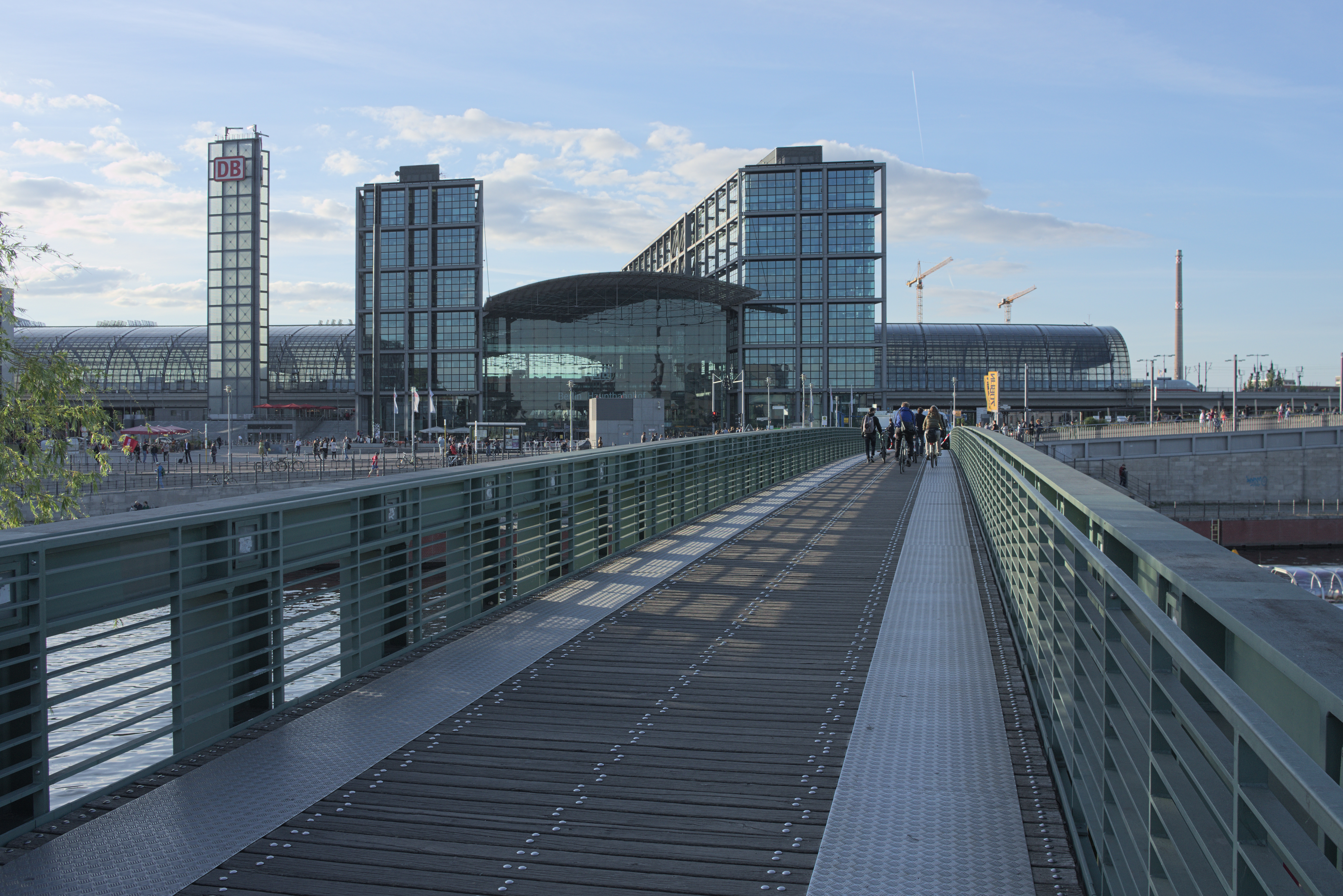
- The bridge in 2015
- Coordinates: 52°31′22″N 13°22′15″E
- Locale: Berlin, Germany
- Begins: Berlin-Moabit
- Ends: Tiergarten

Location
- Interactive map of Gustav Heinemann Bridge

Gustav Heinemann Bridge (German: Gustav-Heinemann-Brücke) is a Vierendeel truss bridge connecting Berlin-Moabit and Tiergarten in Berlin, Germany. It was designed by Max Dudler. The bridge began construction in May 2005 and was completed on June 30, 2005. It carries pedestrian traffic. It is 88.00 m (288.71 ft) in total length and has a truss height of 2.25 m (7.38 ft). The bridge is named after former president of West Germany, Gustav Heinemann (1969-1974).
