= Prizyv =

German newspaper in Berlin (1919–20)

Prizyv was a daily newspaper published in Berlin, Germany from June 22, 1919 to March 14, 1920. It is notorious for having translated and republished A Protocol of 1919 from the Estonian newspaper Postimees. The 1934 300-page compilation of the Protocols of the Elders of Zion allegedly quotes from this paper this antisemitic item. Says Walter Laqueur:

On these ideological rubbish dumps, Prizyu, a daily newspaper published in Berlin, flourished for a brief period in 1919-1920. The German right-wing extremist press was supplied for years with information first published in Prizyv during its nine months of existence.

== See also ==
- The Protocols
