= Luther Bridge =

Luther Bridge Lutherbrücke
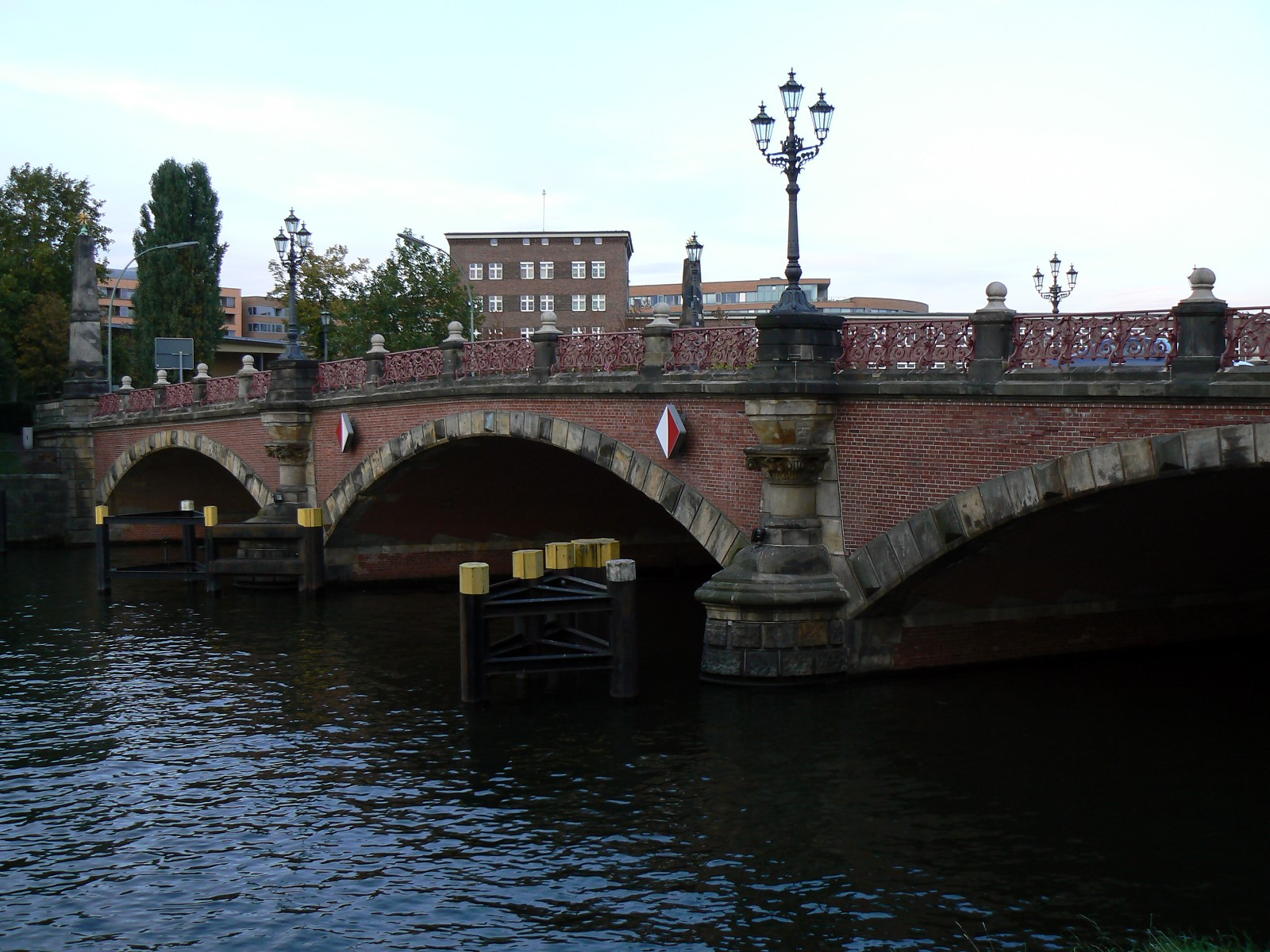
- The bridge in 2007
- Coordinates: 52°31′03″N 13°21′17″E
- Named for: Martin Luther

History
- Construction end: 1892

Luther Bridge (German: Lutherbrücke) is a bridge over the Spree in Berlin, Germany. The bridge connects Spreeweg, adjacent to the Tiergarten, with Paulstraße in Moabit.

== Design and history ==
The bridge was built in 1892 and is named after Martin Luther, who was a seminal figure in the Protestant Reformation. The bridge was designed by architects Karl Bernhard and Otto Stahn.
