= Hotel Esplanade Berlin =

Demolished hotel in Berlin

Coordinates: 52.51°N 13.374444°E

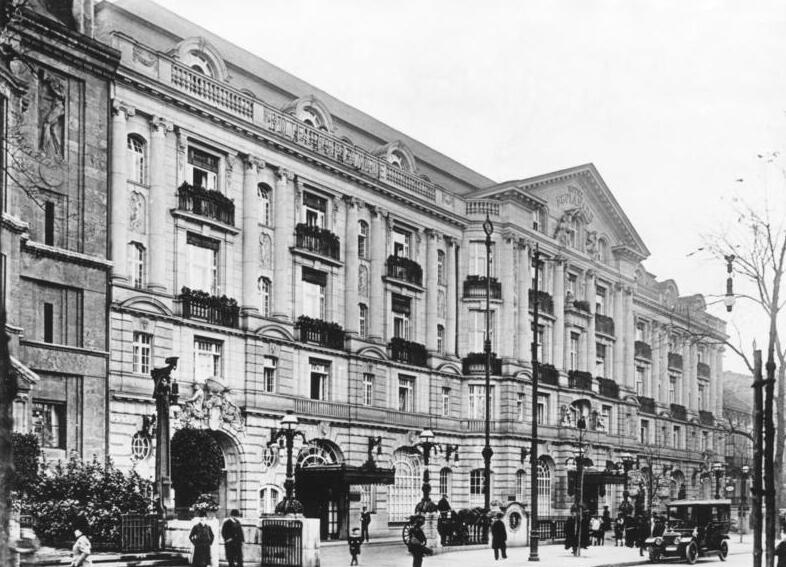
Hotel Esplanade

Location of Hotel Esplanade in Berlin

Hotel Esplanade was a luxury hotel with 400 rooms, which once stood on Berlin's busy transport and nightlife hub Potsdamer Platz. During its colorful and turbulent history it went from being one of the German capital's most luxurious and celebrated hotels to a bombed-out ruin lost in the wastelands alongside the Berlin Wall. A section of it still survives today, albeit as a fragment incorporated into the soaring modern complex of the Sony Center. Wilhelm II is said to have spent many evenings at the hotel entertaining guests, although no women were allowed at these dining parties. The hotel was visited in the 1920s by movie stars such as Charlie Chaplin and Greta Garbo.

== Construction and design ==
The hotel was built between 1907 and 1908 by the Fürstengruppe (Hohenlohe, Fürstenberg und Henckel von Donnersmarck) in accordance with the plans of Otto Rehnig, architect of the nearby and similarly fated Hotel Excelsior. When it opened in 1908 the construction cost an unprecedented 23 million marks (ℳ). The architectural style, with its richly ornamented sandstone façade, was that of the Belle Epoque, and the interior palatial design incorporated elements from the Neo-Baroque and Neo-Rococo. The hotel accommodated numerous magnificent halls, amongst these was the Kaisersaal (the emperor's hall). It was here that Kaiser Wilhelm II held an exclusive men's evening. One of the most celebrated aspects of the hotel was a 1600 m^{2} garden designed by garden architect Willi Wendt, which lay in the inner courtyard.

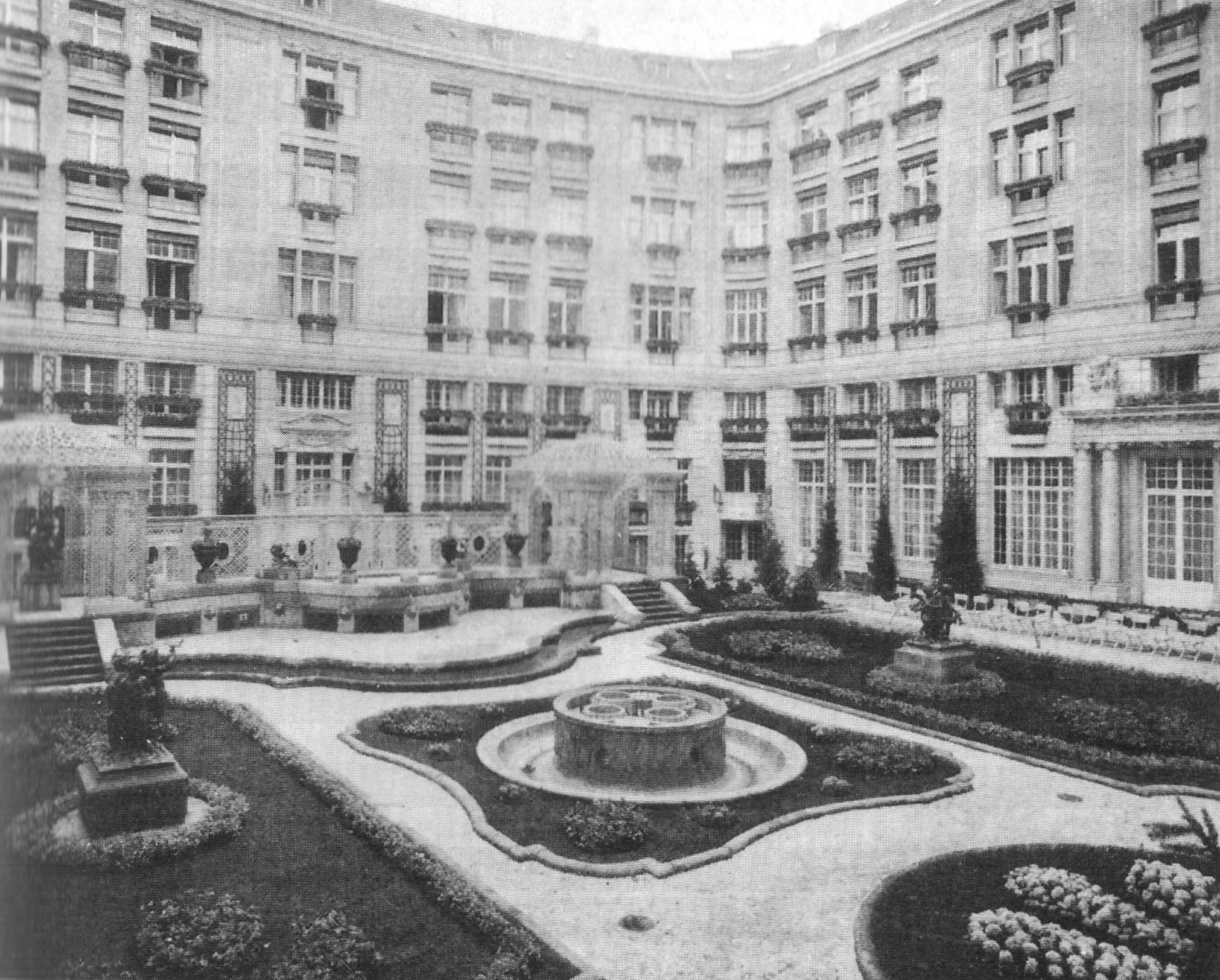
Willi Wendt's inner courtyard garden

In the "Golden Twenties", the Esplanade became the scene of popular tea and dancing afternoons, which were regularly broadcast on the radio. Stars like Charlie Chaplin and Greta Garbo stayed here.

== Once destroyed and twice revived ==
In the winter of 1944/45 90% of the Esplanade was destroyed in bombing raids that crushed the once thriving hub of Potsdamer Platz. The sections that did manage to survive relatively unscathed were the Kaisersaal and the breakfast hall, as well as the stairwell and wash rooms. After the war they were restored and together formed part of the original "Esplanade Hall Building". The ceiling of the Palm Courtyard was restored and one of the other halls, the Silver Hall, was redesigned with its walls and ceiling decorated with silver and pillars adorned with abstract figures and patterns. And so, amidst what was then a rubble-strewn wilderness, the revived Esplanade became a hive of public activity once more. During the 1950s it was used variously as a restaurant and for fancy dress dances and carnival balls, and then later also for fashion shows.

However, in 1961 the Berlin Wall was erected only a short distance away. As a consequence the lively programme of festivities was promptly curtailed.

Nevertheless, although now adrift from the rest of the city it was, with police permission, still accessible and so began a third lease of life as a popular set for films and television programmes. The interior can be seen in such international films as Cabaret (1972) and Wings of Desire (1987).

== The preservation of historical monuments ==
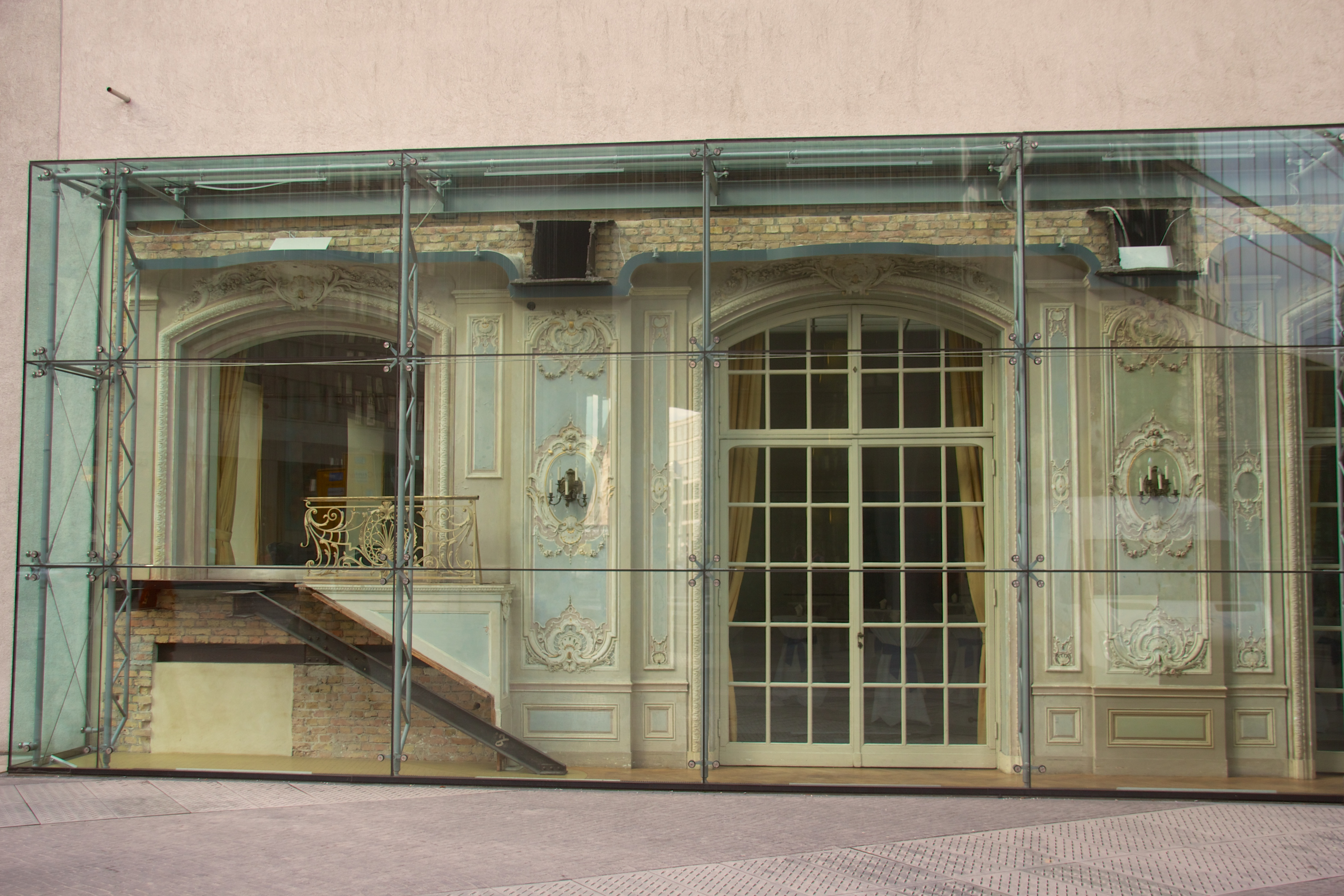
The remains of the Kaisersaal peer out from behind the glass façade of the Sony Center

After the fall of the wall in 1989 the remaining part of the hotel was safeguarded as a listed historical monument. However, when the resurrection of Potsdamer Platz was underway and the first plans for the new Sony Center were drawn up, this factor was not considered; the Kaisersaal stood in the way and was therefore earmarked for demolition. In 1993 a plan was developed to move the Kaisersaal 75 metres (246 feet) and integrate it into the Center itself. This was carried out in March 1996 at a cost of 75 million marks. The Breakfast Hall was dismantled into 500 pieces and then later put back together again; this can be found today in FREDERICK'S.
