= Döbbelinsches Theater =

Former theater in Germany

The Döbbelinsches Theater or Döbbelin Theater, was a theatre in Berlin, active between 1764 and 1799. It was the first permanent German language theatre in Berlin. It was founded by Karl Schuch and was situated in Behrenstraße, replacing the temporary wooden stages on the Gendarmenmarkt nearby. From 1768 on Karl Theophil Döbbelin served as an interim director and after Schuch died on 3 January 1775, Heinrich Gottfried Koch took over on 10 June the same year. When Koch died in 1775, Döbbelin became the theatre's director on 17 April. Prior to its foundation, Berlin had an opera house (founded in 1742) which only employed Italian artists, and travelling theater troupes often visited the city, but the Döbbelin theater was the first permanent theater for a permanent German language stage company.

Among the most notable premieres where Goethe's Götz von Berlichingen in 1774 and Lessing's Nathan the Wise in 1783.

The theatre was dismantled in 1799. In 1892 the Komische Oper Berlin was erected basically at the same location, restarting the theatrical tradition, though mainly concentrating on operettas and musicals while more serious plays were performed in the National-Theater at Gendarmenmarkt from 1802 onwards.
