= Haselhorst station =

Station of the Berlin U-Bahn

Coordinates: 52°32′20″N 13°13′58″E

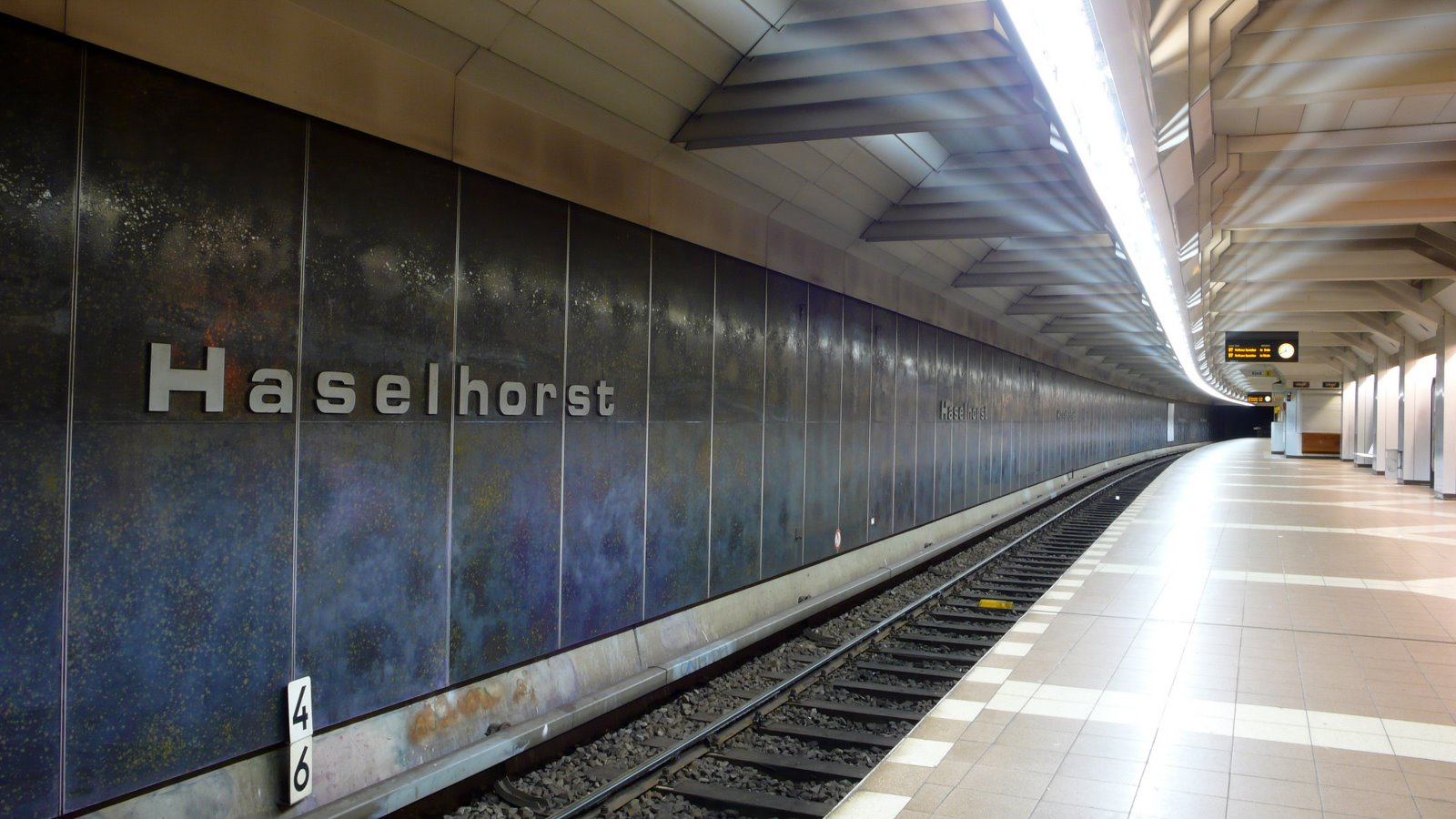

General information
- Owner: Berliner Verkehrsbetriebe
- Operator: Berliner Verkehrsbetriebe
- Platforms: 1 island platform
- Tracks: 2
- Train operators: Berliner Verkehrsbetriebe
- Connections: X33 X36 133 236 N7 N33

Construction
- Structure type: Underground

Other information
- Fare zone: VBB: Berlin B/5656

History
- Opened: 1 October 1984; 42 years ago

Services
| Preceding station | Berlin U-Bahn | Following station |
|---|---|---|
| Zitadelle towards Rathaus Spandau | U7 | Paulsternstraße towards Rudow |
Location
- Location within Berlin

Haselhorst is a station on the Berlin U-Bahn line U7. It was opened on 1 October 1984 with the line's extension from Rohrdamm to Rathaus Spandau. Its name means "hazel eyrie" in English; it was named for the locality where it lies: Haselhorst in the borough of Spandau. It is situated between the stations Zitadelle and Paulsternstraße. It was built by R.G.Rümmler, mentionable are interesting light effects on the ceiling. The next station is Paulsternstraße.
