= Haselhorst =

- Quarter of Berlin
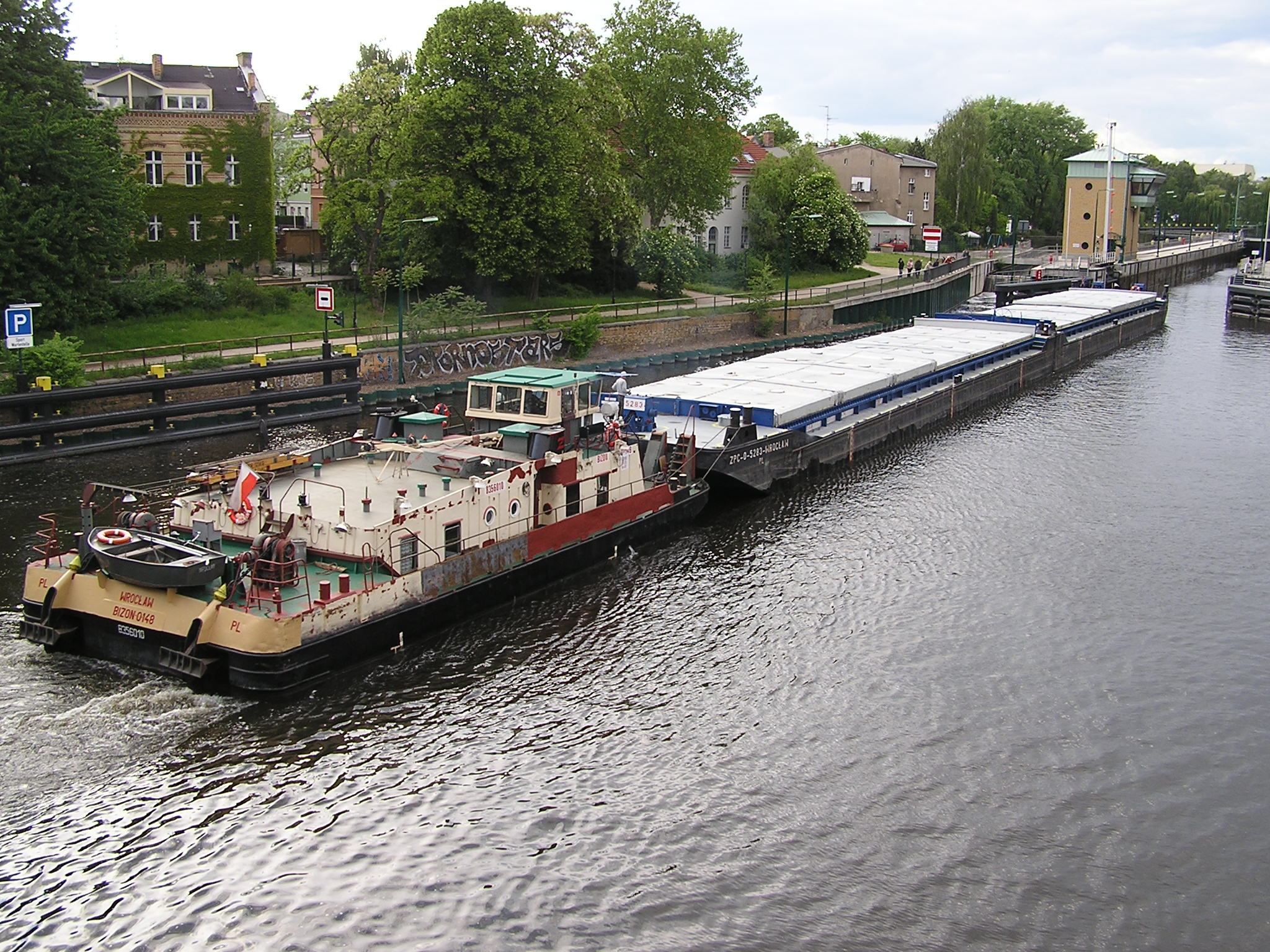
- Havel river between Spandau and Haselhorst

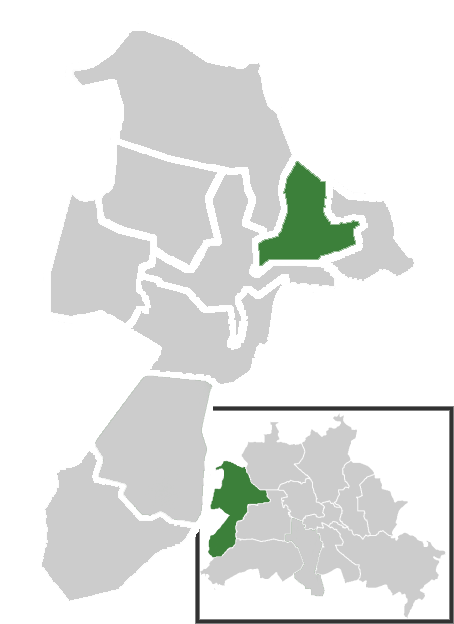
- Location of Haselhorst in Spandau district and Berlin
- Interactive map of Haselhorst
- Location within Germany Location within Berlin
- Coordinates: 52°32′34″N 13°14′23″E
- Country: Germany
- State: Berlin
- City: Berlin
- Borough: Spandau
- Founded: 1910

Area
  - Total: 4.73 km^{2} (1.83 sq mi)
- Elevation: 35 m (115 ft)

Population (2024-12-31)
  - Total: 19,994
  - Density: 4,230/km^{2} (10,900/sq mi)
- Time zone: UTC+01:00 (CET)
  - Summer (DST): UTC+02:00 (CEST)
- Postal codes: 13599
- Vehicle registration: B

Haselhorst (German pronunciation: [ˈhaːzl̩ˌhɔʁst]) is a locality in the borough of Spandau in Berlin. It is located between Siemensstadt and the Old Town of Spandau and is separated from the Hakenfelde locality by the River Havel.

== Overview ==
The manor of Haselhorst was incorporated into the City of Spandau in 1910 and together with it became a part of Greater Berlin in 1920.

The Spandau Citadel is located in Haselhorst. The kings of Prussia kept barracks in Haselhorst. Today industries such as BMW motorcycles, Siemens and Osram are located there.

== Transportation ==
Haselhorst is served by the U7 line of the Berlin U-Bahn at the stations Paulsternstraße, Haselhorst and Zitadelle.
