= Zitadelle station =

Station of the Berlin U-Bahn

Coordinates: 52°32′16″N 13°13′04″E

Zitadelle
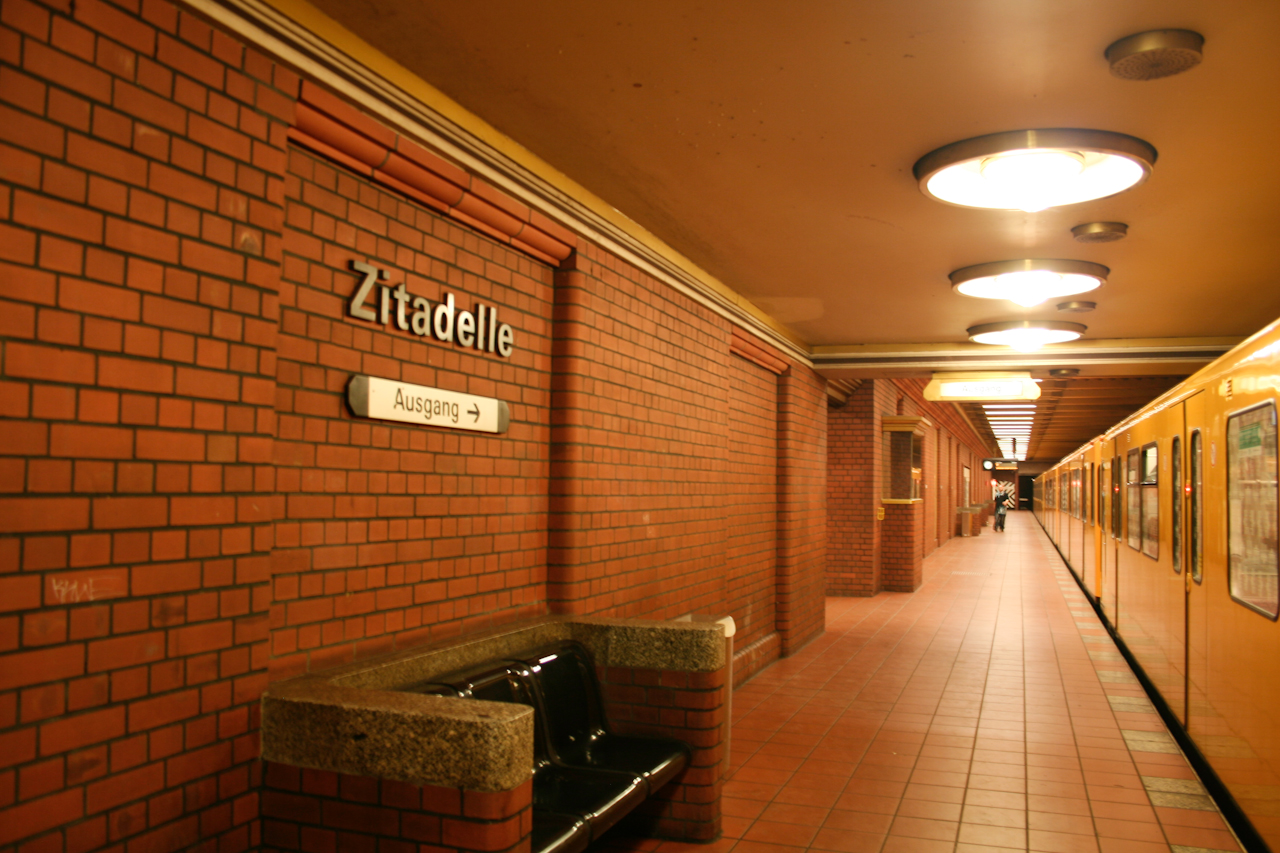
- Platform view of Zitadelle

General information
- Owner: Berliner Verkehrsbetriebe
- Operator: Berliner Verkehrsbetriebe
- Platforms: 2
- Tracks: 2
- Train operators: Berliner Verkehrsbetriebe

Construction
- Structure type: Underground

Other information
- Fare zone: VBB: Berlin B/5656

History
- Opened: 1 October 1984; 42 years ago

Services
Preceding station	Berlin U-Bahn	Following station
Altstadt Spandau towards Rathaus Spandau	U7	Haselhorst towards Rudow
Location

Zitadelle is a station on the Berlin U-Bahn line U7. It was opened on 1 October 1984 with the line's extension from Rohrdamm to Rathaus Spandau. Its name means "Citadel" in English and it was named for the historic Spandau Citadel. Unlike most U-Bahn stations, Zitadelle has side platforms. The station's interiors were also designed to resemble the citadel's style.

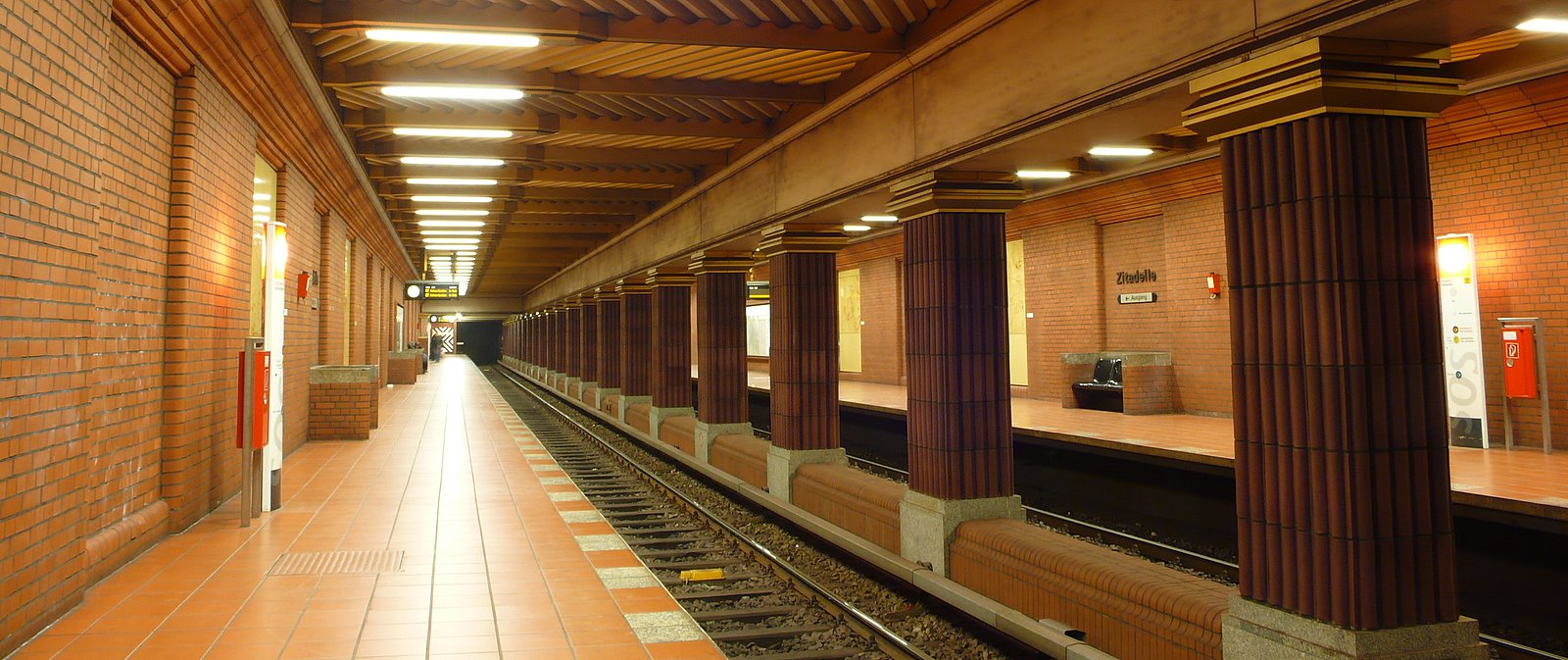
Platform view

It lies between the stations Altstadt Spandau and Haselhorst. It was built/opened by R.G.Rümmler in 1984 (planned was the name "Am Juliusturm"). This station has side platforms because during its construction the important street above could not be blocked. So first the northern platform was built then the southern. The next station is Haselhorst.
