= Charlottenburg-Nord =

- Quarter of Berlin
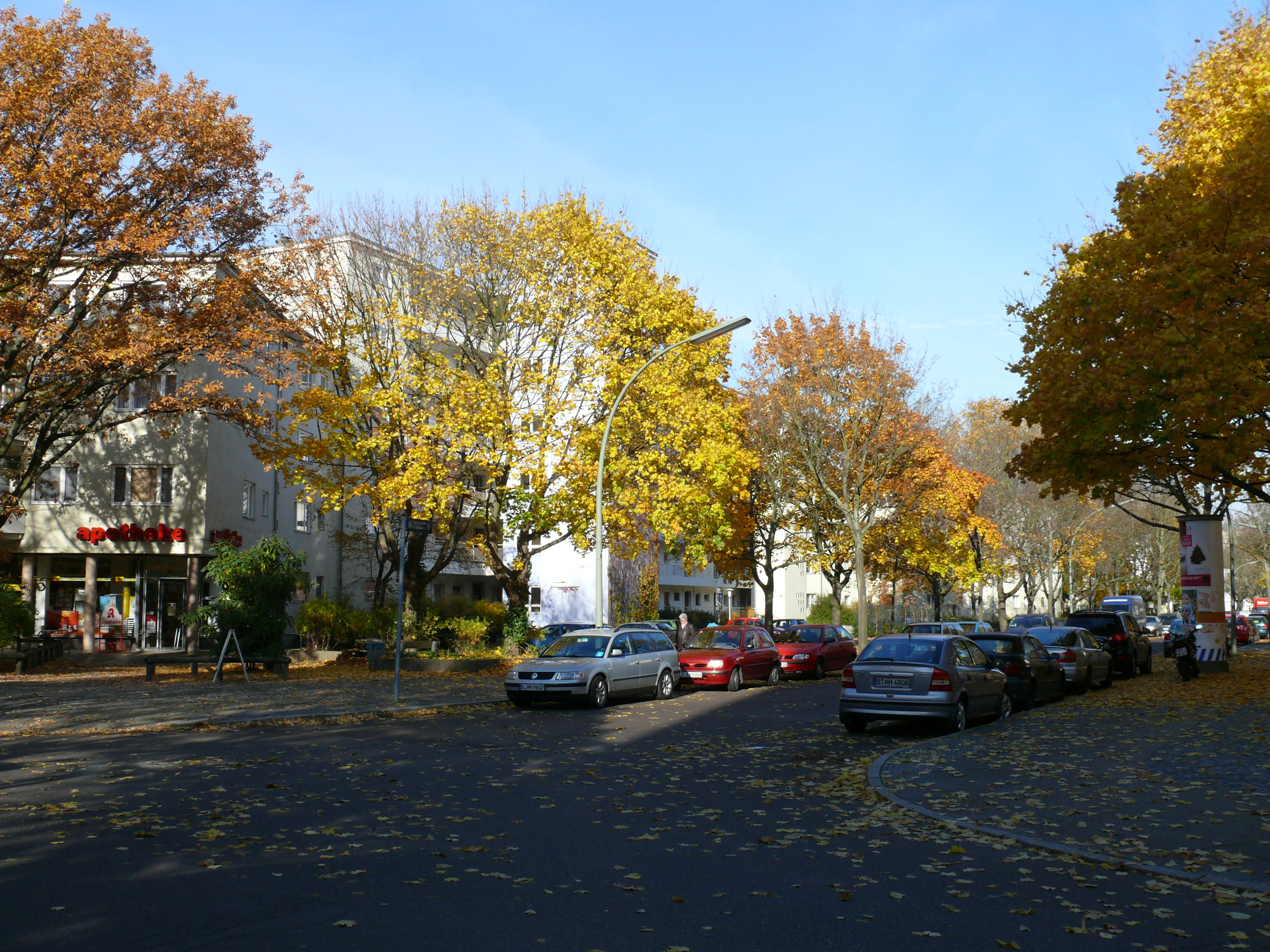
- Charlottenburg-Nord, Halemweg

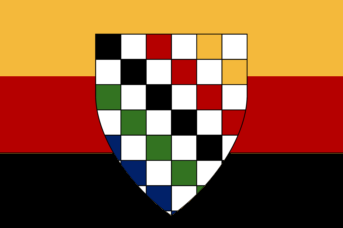
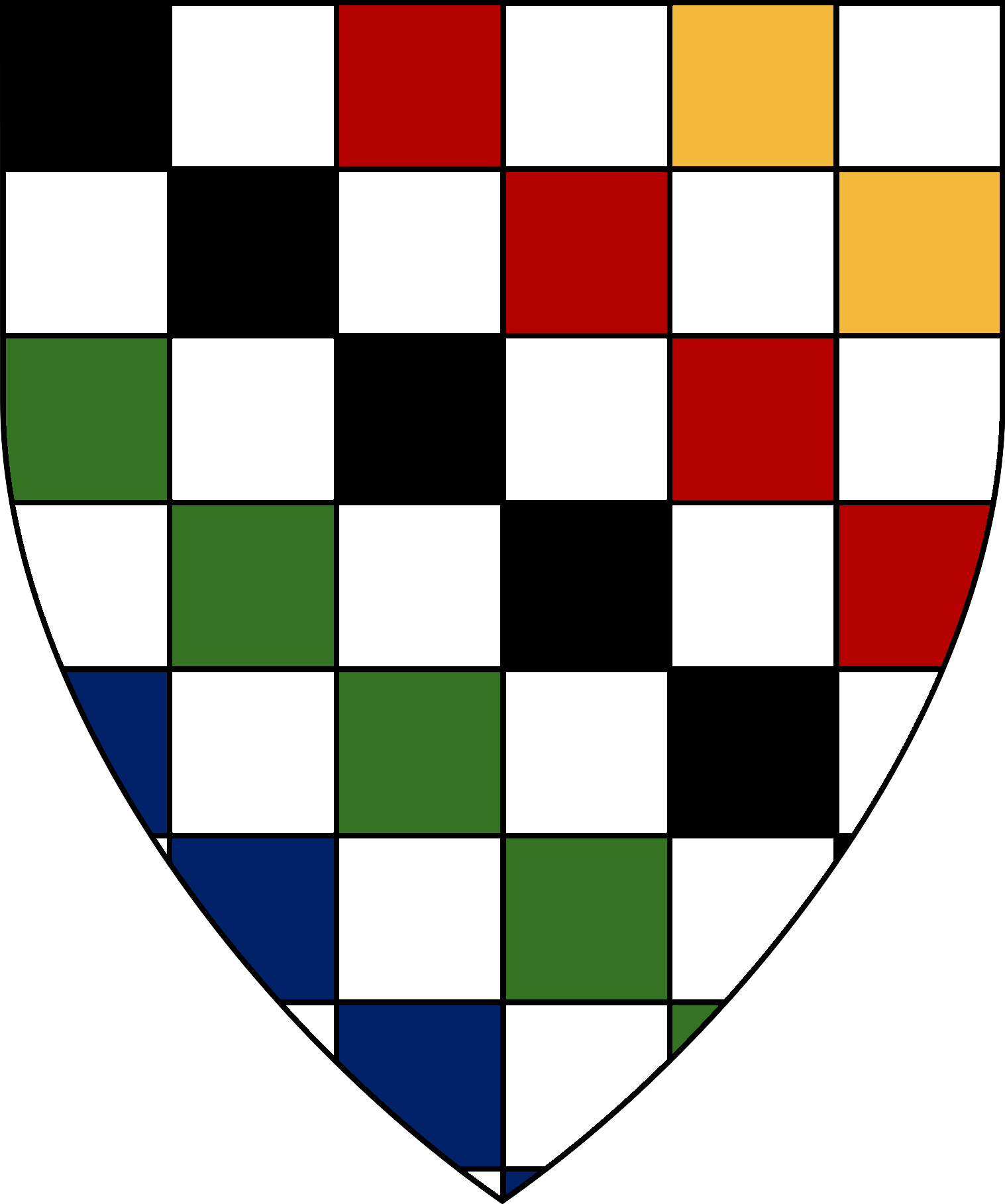
- Flag Coat of arms

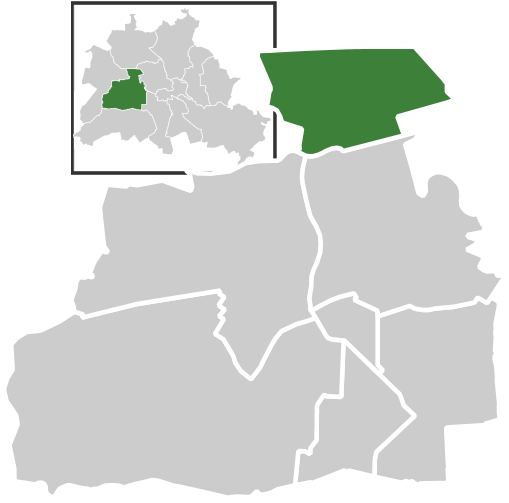
- Location of Charlottenburg-Nord in Charlottenburg-Wilmersdorf and Berlin
- Interactive map of Charlottenburg-Nord
- Location within Germany Location within Berlin
- Coordinates: 52°32′20″N 13°17′35″E
- Country: Germany
- State: Berlin
- City: Berlin
- Borough: Charlottenburg-Wilmersdorf
- Founded: 2004

Area
  - Total: 6.2 km^{2} (2.4 sq mi)
- Elevation: 52 m (171 ft)

Population (2024-12-31)
  - Total: 19,665
  - Density: 3,200/km^{2} (8,200/sq mi)
- Time zone: UTC+01:00 (CET)
  - Summer (DST): UTC+02:00 (CEST)
- Postal codes: 13627
- Vehicle registration: B

Charlottenburg-Nord (German pronunciation: [ʃaʁˈlɔtn̩bʊʁk nɔʁt], literally "Charlottenburg North") is a locality (Ortsteil) in the northern part of the Charlottenburg-Wilmersdorf borough of Berlin, Germany. It is chiefly composed of after-war housing estates, allotment gardens and commercial zones. The locality comprises the Großsiedlung Siemensstadt, part of the Berlin Modernism Housing Estates UNESCO World Heritage Site, as well as Plötzensee Prison.

== Geography ==
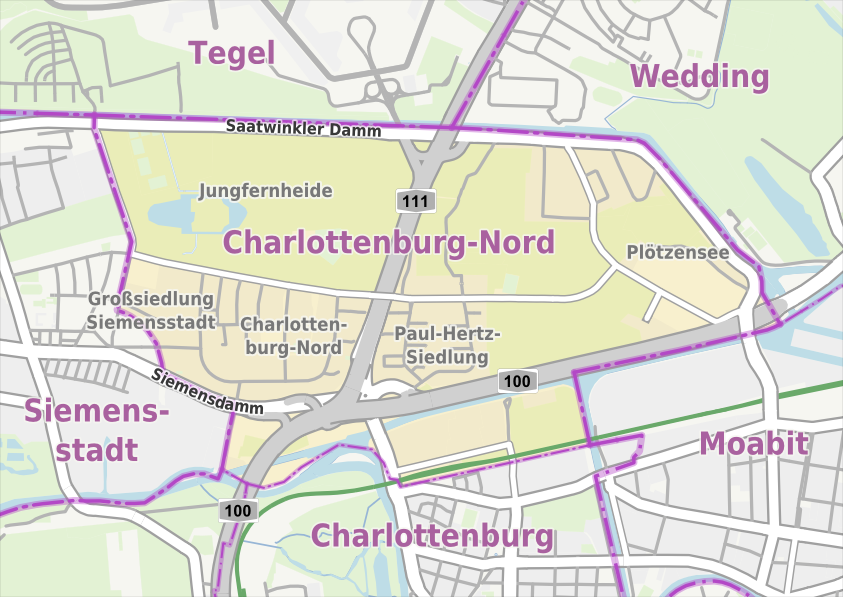
Map of Charlottenburg-Nord with its Ortslagen

Charlottenburg-Nord is situated in the western suburbs of Berlin, beyond the Ringbahn line of the Berlin S-Bahn. In the north the Berlin-Spandau Ship Canal forms the border with Reinickendorf and Tegel, a bridge leading right to the southern entrance of former Berlin Tegel Airport. It further borders with Siemensstadt (part of the Spandau borough) in the west. In the east and south the Berlin-Spandau Ship Canal and the Westhafen Canal mark the border with the inner city localities of Wedding and Moabit (both part of the Mitte borough) and Charlottenburg.

The locality is subdivided in several zones (Ortslagen) like the Großsiedlung Siemensstadt and Siedlung Charlottenburg-Nord housing estates in the west, the Jungfernheide municipal park as well as the Paul-Hertz-Siedlung and Plötzensee in the east with the Roman Catholic commemorative church Maria Regina Martyrum, honouring the Martyrs of Freedom of Belief and Conscience that were executed at Plötzensee Prison during the Nazi era in the years from 1933 to 1945. Together with the nearby Protestant Church of Plötzensee, it is the site of the annual Ecumenical Plötzensee Days.

== History ==
The locality was created in 2004, when it was separated from Charlottenburg in the south. Since the 1920 Greater Berlin Act, the area had been part of the Charlottenburg borough (Bezirk Charlottenburg), united with Wilmersdorf in the 2001 administrative reform.

== Transport ==
The Bundesautobahn 100 (Stadtring) motorway runs through the south of the locality, where the interchange on Jakob-Kaiser-Platz (Dreieck Charlottenburg) connects the Bundesautobahn 111 leading northwards to the Berliner Ring (A 10) motorway. The adjacent areas are strongly affected by noise and pollution.

The former Air Berlin had its headquarters in Building 2 of the Airport Bureau Center in Charlottenburg-Nord. In 2006 Air Berlin had been employing 1,200 employees at its headquarters. The former Germania airlines also had its headquarters in Charlottenburg-Nord.

Regarding urban rail transports, Charlottenburg-Nord is served both by U-Bahn and S-Bahn, at the stations of Jungfernheide (S4, U7 and DB Regional-Express service), Jakob-Kaiser-Platz (U7) and Halemweg (U7).
