= Altstadt Spandau station =

Station of the Berlin U-Bahn

Coordinates: 52°32′20″N 13°12′23″E

Altstadt Spandau
- Platform view of Altstadt Spandau

General information
- Owner: Berliner Verkehrsbetriebe
- Operator: Berliner Verkehrsbetriebe
- Platforms: 1 island platform
- Tracks: 2
- Train operators: Berliner Verkehrsbetriebe

Construction
- Structure type: Underground

Other information
- Fare zone: VBB: Berlin B/5656

History
- Opened: 1 October 1984; 42 years ago

Services
Preceding station	Berlin U-Bahn	Following station
Rathaus Spandau Terminus	U7	Zitadelle towards Rudow
Location
- Location within Berlin

Altstadt Spandau is a station in the Spandau district of Berlin, on that city's U-Bahn line U7. It takes its name from the Altstadt Spandau, the historic central area of the former independent city of Spandau.

The station was opened on 1 October 1984 (architect R.G.Rümmler) with the line's extension from Rohrdamm to Rathaus Spandau. It lies between Rathaus Spandau and Zitadelle stations. The next station is Zitadelle.

The station was, like many U-Bahn stations at that time, very elaborately and magnificently designed by Rainer G. Rümmler. In March 2017, it was announced that the station - along with six other northern U7 stations - would be heritage listed. This happened at the end of 2018.

It lies at a depth of 14 metres (46 ft), as to the east the nearby river Havel had to be crossed. Therefore the caisson method was used to construct the station. In the direction of Spandau Town Hall, the then unusual shield tunneling method was used to preserve the historical buildings in Spandau's Altstadt (Old Town).

A barrier-free extension of the station, including a lift, is planned for the end of 2019.
