= Kleistpark station =

Station of the Berlin U-Bahn

Coordinates: 52°29′26″N 13°21′37″E

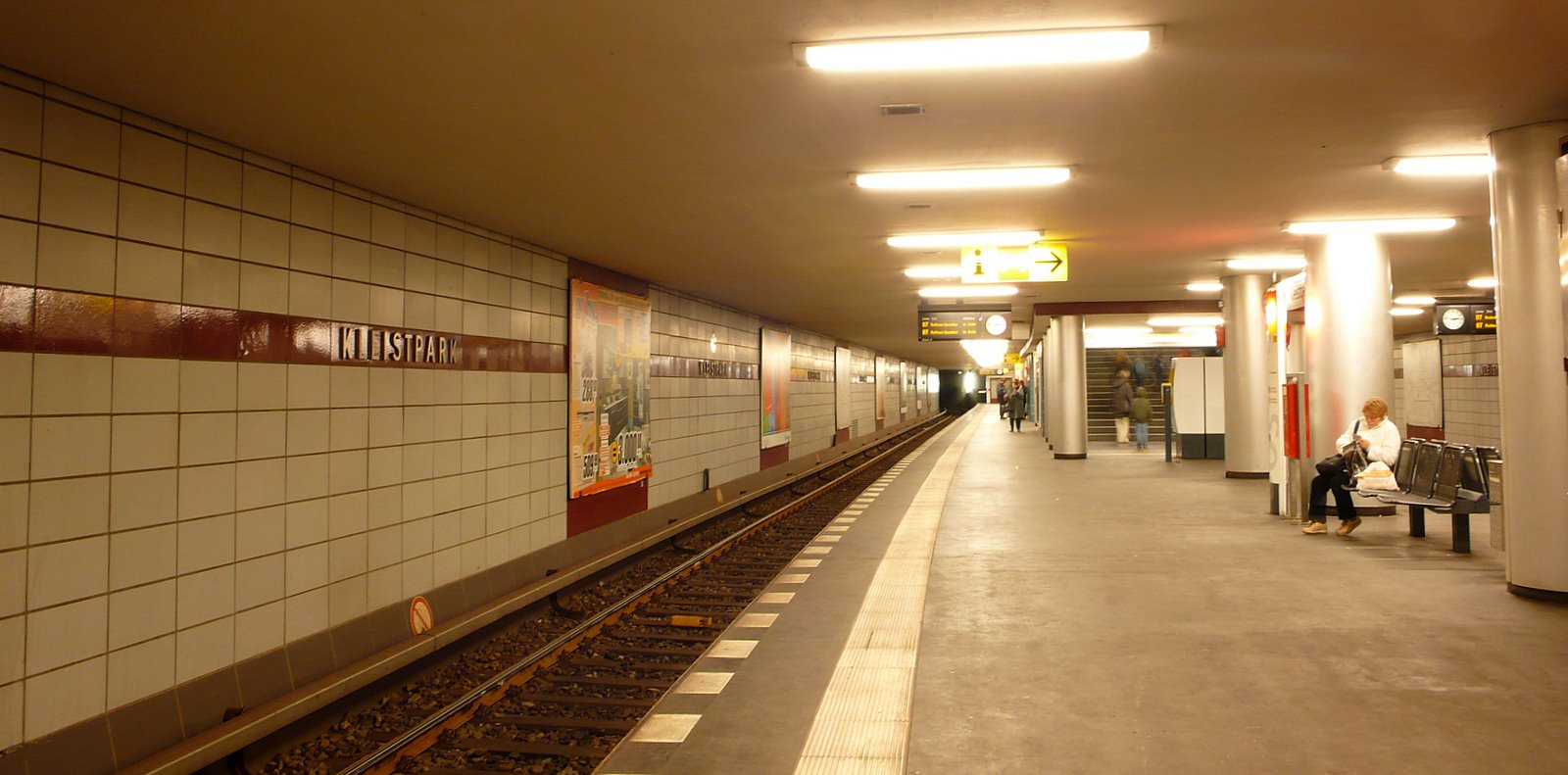
Platform of the station

Kleistpark is a Berlin U-Bahn station on the U7 line. The station was designed by the architect Rümmler, opened in 1971, and is located near the head office of the Berliner Verkehrsbetriebe (Berlin Transport Company). The following station is Yorckstraße (with connections to S-Bahn lines S1, S2 and S25).

Preceding station	Berlin U-Bahn	Following station
Eisenacher Straße towards Rathaus Spandau	U7	Yorckstraße towards Rudow
