= Siemensdamm station =

Station of the Berlin U-Bahn

Coordinates: 52°32′12″N 13°16′23″E

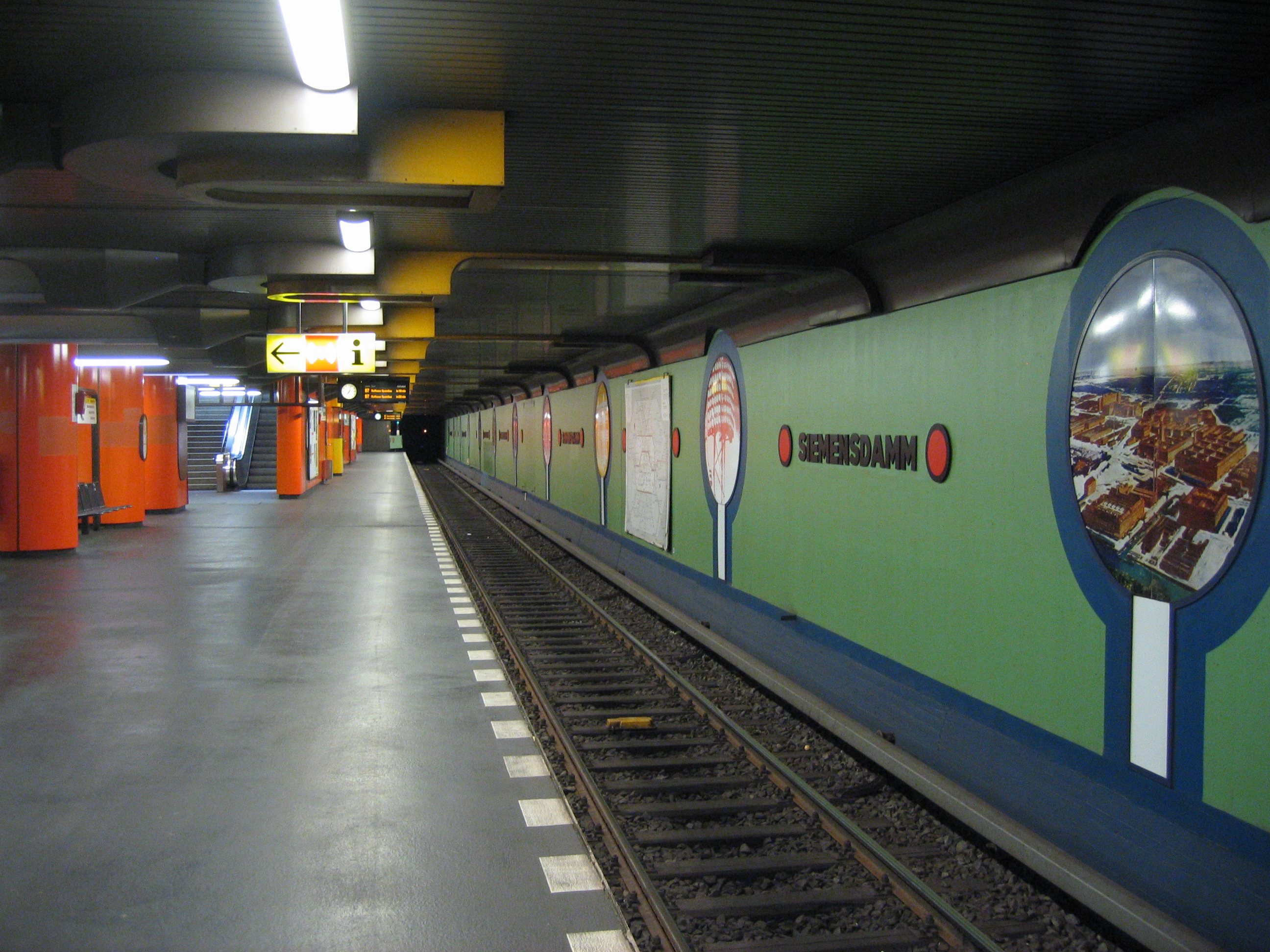
Platform view

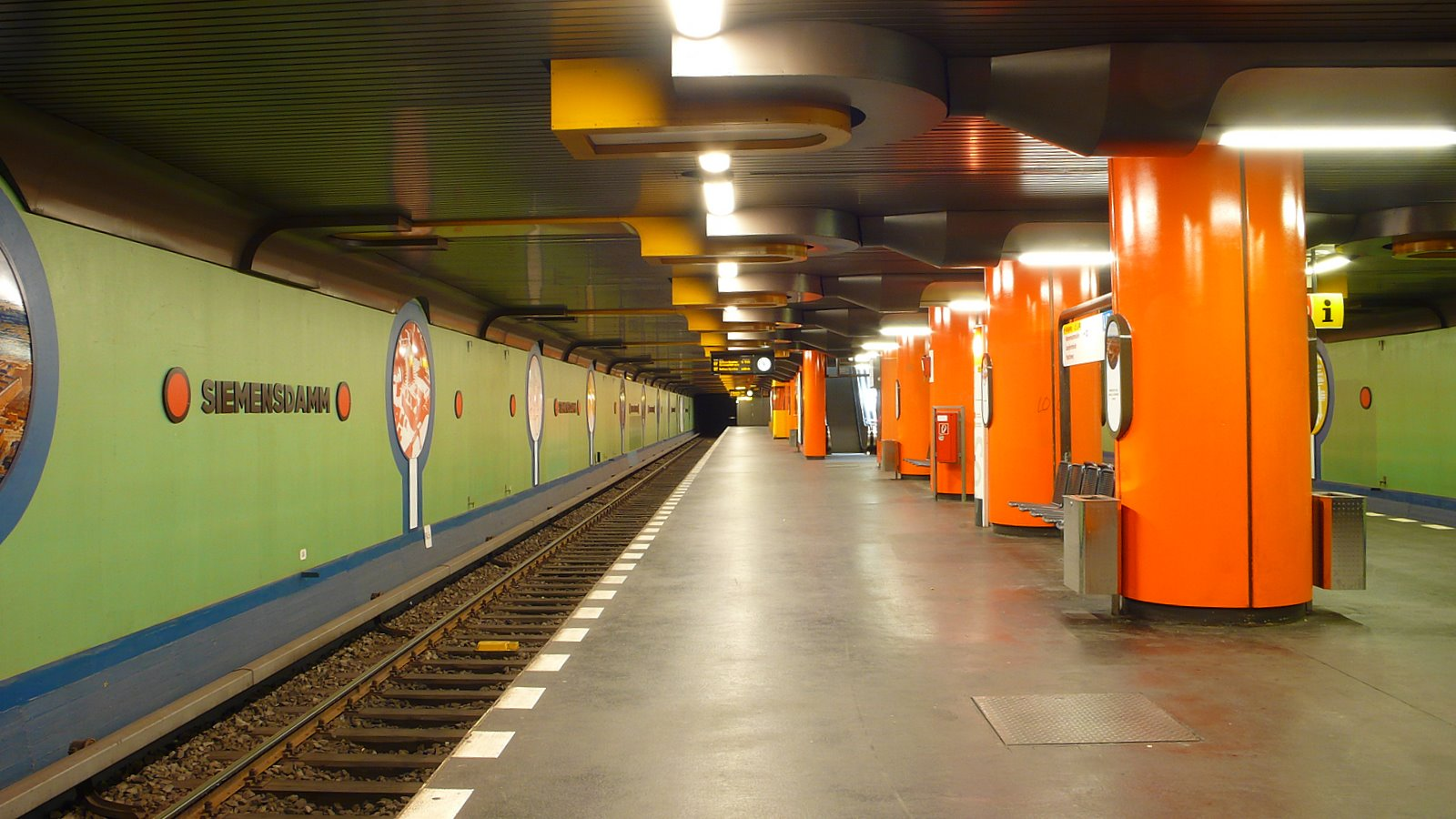
Platform of the station

Siemensdamm is a station on the Berlin U-Bahn line U7, located in the Spandau district. It was opened on 1 October 1980 (designed by R.G.Rümmler) with the line's extension from Richard-Wagner-Platz to Rohrdamm. The station is named after an arterial street, which itself is named after Werner von Siemens. The company he founded, Siemens, has many facilities in the station's surroundings.

The station is constructed as a "Multi-Purpose Facility". It is prepared and partially stocked to be used as an NBC shelter. It is specified to sustain 4,332 people for 14 days. The next station is Halemweg.

Preceding station	Berlin U-Bahn	Following station
Rohrdamm towards Rathaus Spandau	U7	Halemweg towards Rudow
