= Zitadelle =

Zitadelle ("Citadel") may refer to:

- Spandau Citadel (German: Zitadelle Spandau), a fortress in Berlin
- Zitadelle (Berlin U-Bahn), a railway station serving the Spandau Citadel
- Zitadelle Mainz, a fortress in Mainz
- Operation Zitadelle, the German offensive operation for the Battle of Kursk
