= Eisenacher Straße station =

Station of the Berlin U-Bahn

Coordinates: 52°29′22″N 13°21′01″E

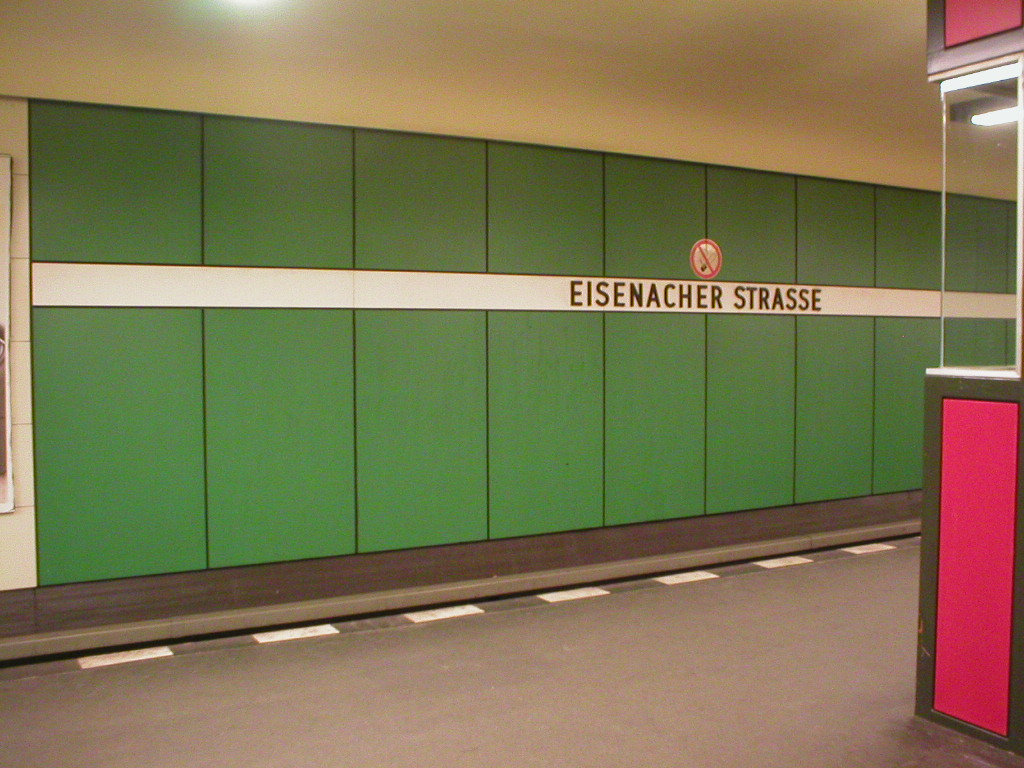
U-Bahn station Eisenacher Straße

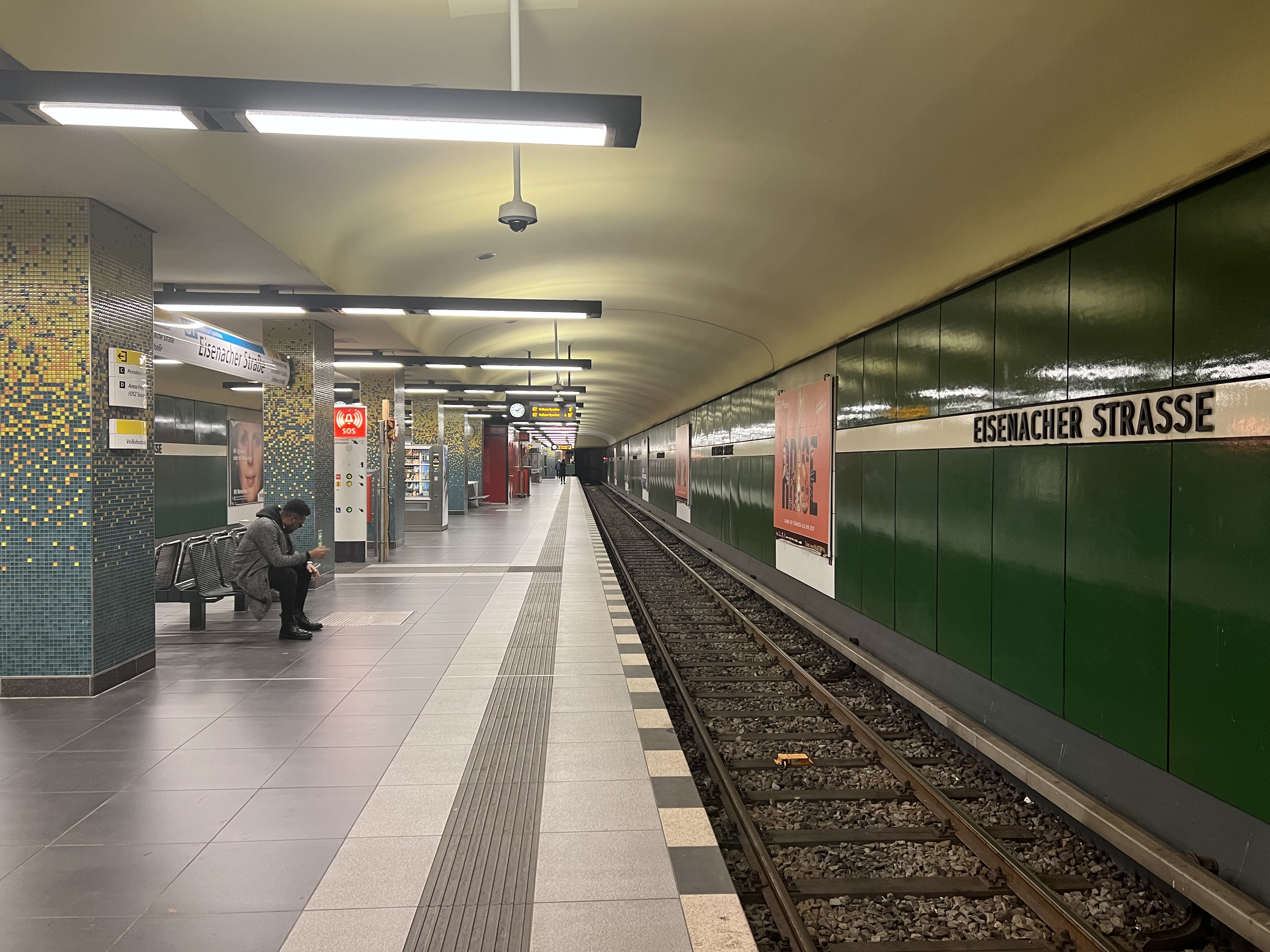
Platform of the station

Eisenacher Straße is a Berlin U-Bahn station located on the U7. R.G. Rümmler constructed this station which was opened 1971. The wall is covered with green asbestos cement panels. Since Eisenach is a city near the forest in Thuringia, which is called the green heart of Germany, Rümmler chose green as the color of this station. The next station is Kleistpark.

== Notes ==
Preceding station	Berlin U-Bahn	Following station
Bayerischer Platz towards Rathaus Spandau	U7	Kleistpark towards Rudow
