= Nikolaus von Halem =

German Resistance member

Coordinates: 52°32′12″N 13°17′11″E

Nikolaus Christoph von Halem
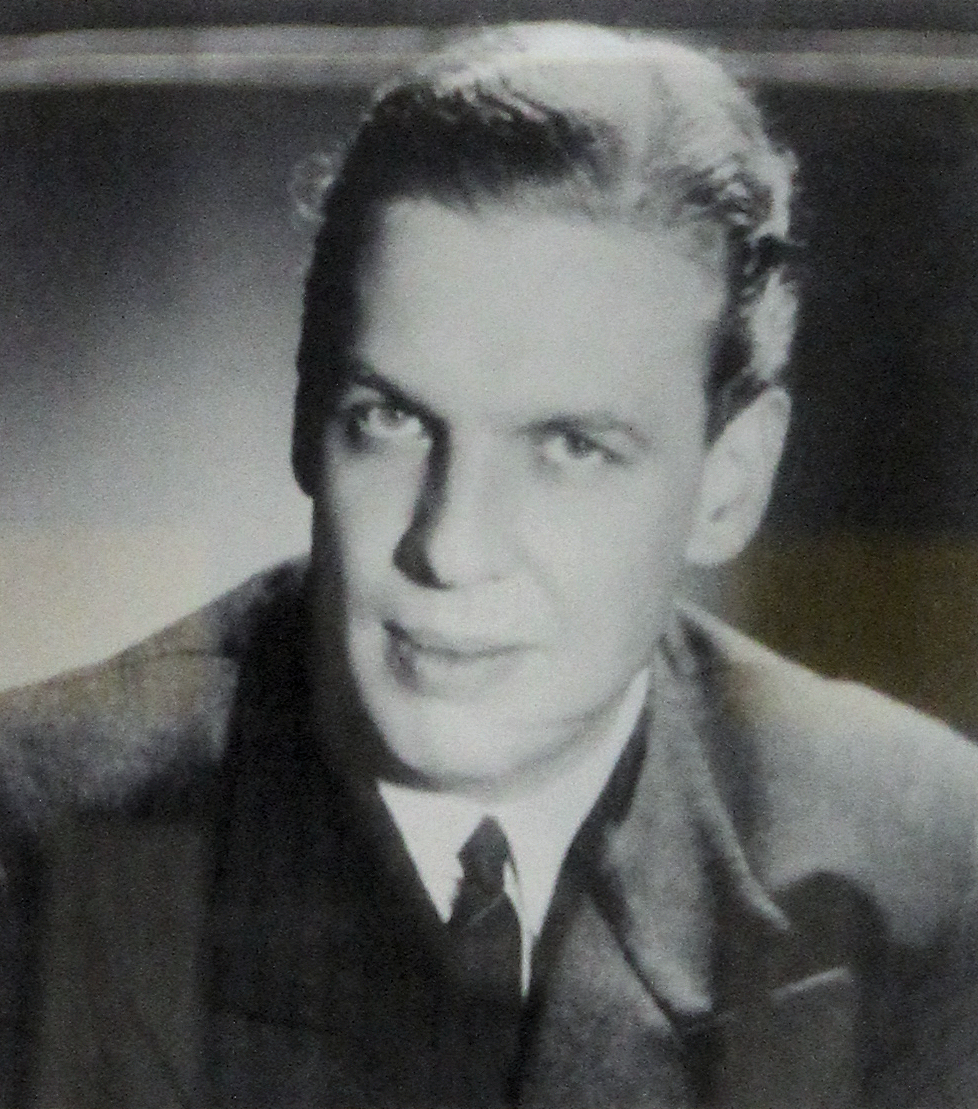
- Born: 15 March 1905; Schwetz, West Prussia, German Empire
- Died: 9 October 1944 (aged 39); Brandenburg-Görden Prison, Brandenburg an der Havel, Nazi Germany
- Cause of death: Execution by guillotine

Nikolaus Christoph von Halem (15 March 1905 – 9 October 1944) was a German lawyer, businessman, and resistance fighter against Nazism.

== Early life ==
Halem was born in Schwetz in West Prussia (present-day Świecie, Poland). He was the fourth child of Gustav Adolf von Halem (1870–1932), a Prussian district administrator, and his wife Hertha von Halem, née von Tiedemann (1879–1957). During the First World War, the family moved to Berlin.

As a child Halem was first educated at home, later he attended a gymnasium in Schwetz. After his family moved to Berlin, he attended the Protestant monastery school in Roßleben, Thuringia. Having finished high school, in March 1922, he studied law at the University of Göttingen, Leipzig University, the Ludwig-Maximilians-Universität München, and Heidelberg University. During Halem's time at the university, he belonged to the Corps Saxo-Borussia Heidelberg student fraternity, but was excluded for intoxication.

From 1931 he did his legal clerkship. In the same year he married Marie (Mariechen) Garbe, with whom he had two sons.

== Politics ==
After his studies, Halem initially joined far-right Black Reichswehr paramilitary troops and became involved in Adolf Hitler's Beer Hall Putsch and the Nazis' march on the Munich Feldherrnhalle on 9 November 1923. Later, however, he distanced himself from the rising Nazi Party. From about 1930, he became active in the conservative Catholic circles around scholar Carl von Jordans in Berlin, whose goal was to keep the Nazi movement from power. Through these groups and his legal training he established close contacts with other opponents of the Nazis like Karl Ludwig Freiherr von und zu Guttenberg and Henning von Tresckow.

A few months after the appointment of Adolf Hitler as Reich Chancellor and the Nazi seizure of power in January 1933, Halem quit his legal internship to avoid having to swear allegiance to Hitler. By 1935, under the influence of Ernst Niekisch and Carl von Jordans, Halem already had concluded that killing Hitler was a political necessity to avert a catastrophe.

In 1936, Halem served as an official of the Reich Price Commissioner Carl Friedrich Goerdeler, who soon after fell out with the Nazi government and was replaced by Josef Wagner. By 1938, Halem acted as a liaison, with his friend Wilhelm von Ketteler, of anti-Nazi groups in Austria. Hitler's plans for the Anschluss annexation of Austria upset Halem, while Ketteler conspired to assassinate the dictator at the time of the German invasion. According to his brother, Halem traveled to Czechoslovakia during the Anschluss in March 1938, to be safe from being arrested by the Gestapo.

In 1940 Halem took a leading position in the estate management of his friend Hubert von Ballestrem. This activity served him well as a facade to disguise his renewed activity on assassination planning and goal of political unrest. He took many business trips abroad and used them to contact anti-Nazi groups in England and other countries.

== Assassination plans ==
Already upon the 1934 Night of the Long Knives, Halem was involved in a plot to assassinate Hitler, together with Josef "Beppo" Römer, a former Freikorps member like him, which led to Römer's arrest and imprisonment in the Dachau concentration camp until 1939. Upon the Invasion of Poland, both agreed that Hitler's war was a "sheer madness" and saw the need to end Hitler, the war and to eliminate Nazi governance. Halem offered Josef Römer money to find and hire an assassin who could eliminate Hitler by shooting him or using a grenade.

In 1941 Halem broke contact with Römer who agreed to continue with the plan but still hesitated to act. In early 1942, Römer was arrested by the Nazi police and under torture revealed the assassination plot. Halem was arrested on 26 February 1942 by the Gestapo and suffered torture through a number of prisons and concentration camps, including Sachsenhausen, but did not reveal any of his fellow conspirators. In June 1944, shortly before the 20 July 1944 coup attempt, the People's Court indicted Halem for conspiracy to commit treason and undermining the war effort. He was sentenced to death and executed by guillotine in Brandenburg-Görden Prison on 9 October 1944.

== Remembrance ==
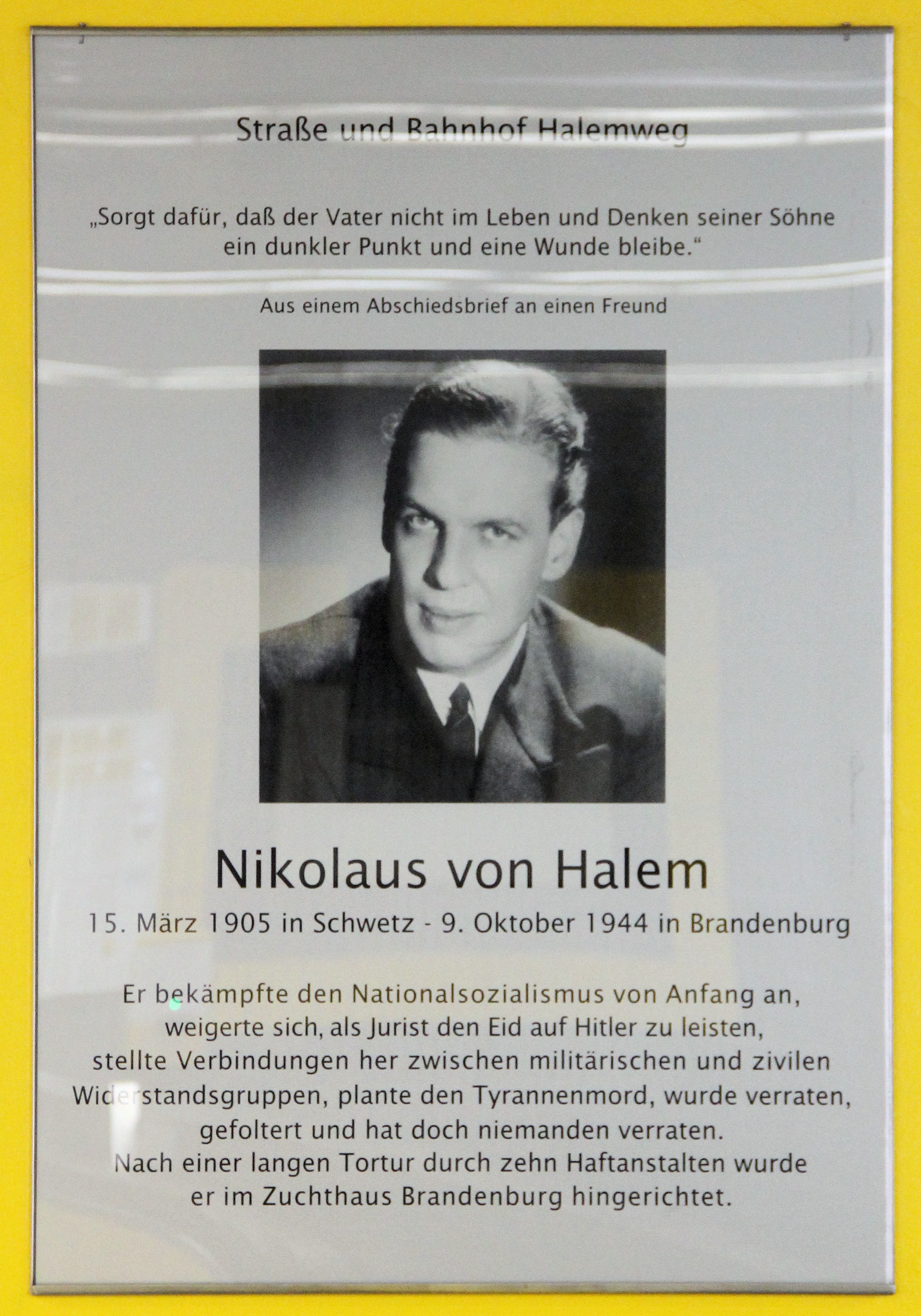
Memorial plaque to Nikolaus Christoph von Halem at Halemweg station in Charlottenburg-Nord, Berlin

In the vicinity of Plötzensee Prison in Berlin, a street was named Halemweg in 1957. Nearby is the U-Bahn station likewise named Halemweg. In the station is a plaque, erected in honour of Halem's in September 2010. In Brandenburg an der Havel is a street named after him: Nikolaus-von-Halem-Straße.

== See also ==
- Assassination attempts on Adolf Hitler
- List of members of the 20 July plot
- * * Operation Foxley – British plot to assassinate Hitler using a sniper
- Operation Spark (1941) – plans generated in the early 1940s by German anti-Nazis to assassinate Hitler
