= Halemweg station =

Station of the Berlin U-Bahn

Coordinates: 52°32′12″N 13°17′11″E

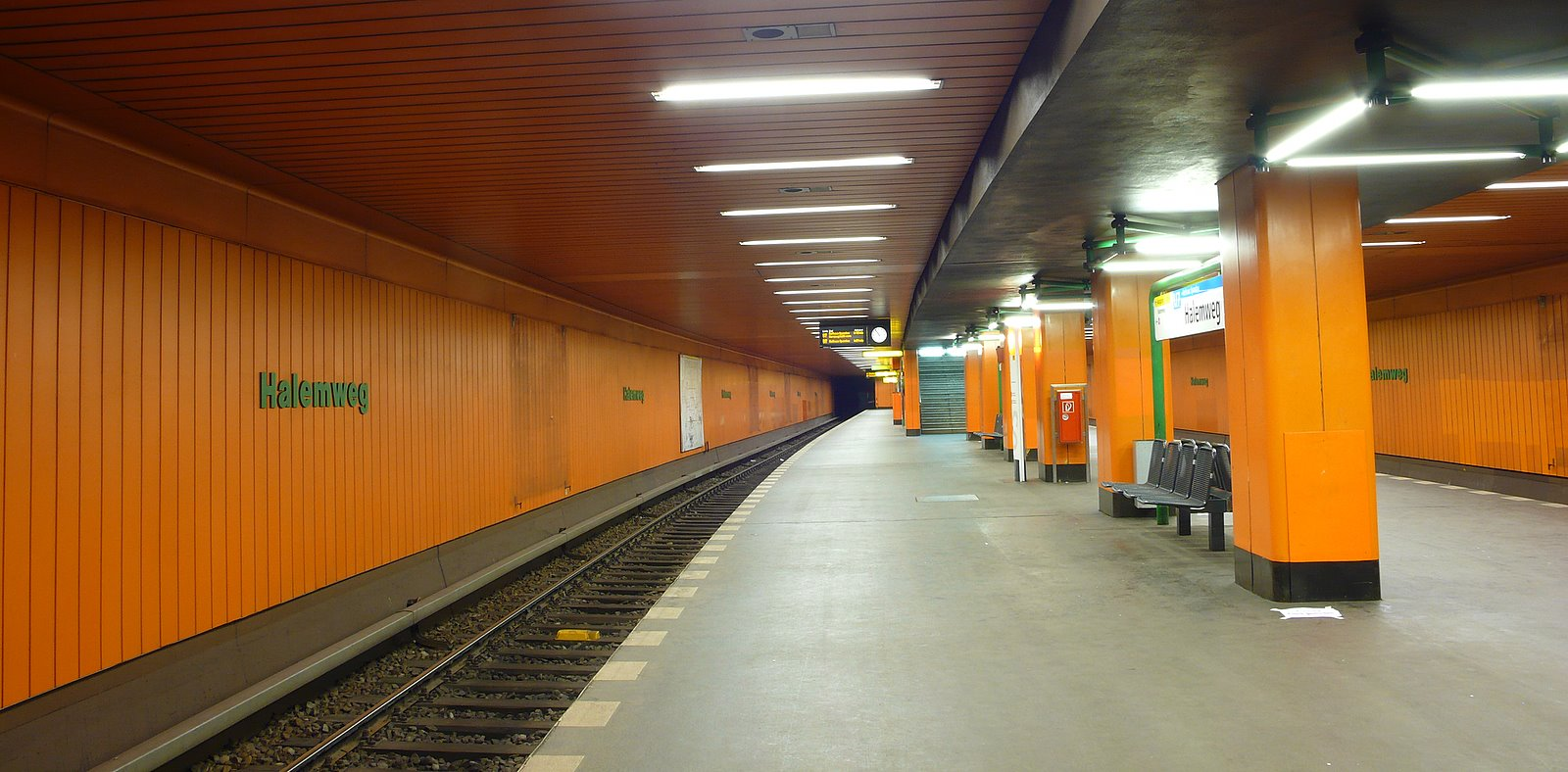
U-Bahn station Halemweg

Halemweg is a station on the Berlin U-Bahn line U7, located in the Charlottenburg-Nord district. It was opened on 1 October 1980 (architect R.G.Rümmler) with the line's extension from Richard-Wagner-Platz to Rohrdamm. The eponymous neighborhood street is named after Resistance fighter Nikolaus von Halem, who was executed in Brandenburg-Görden Prison on 9 October 1944. The next station is Jakob-Kaiser-Platz.

== Notes ==
Preceding station	Berlin U-Bahn	Following station
Siemensdamm towards Rathaus Spandau	U7	Jakob-Kaiser-Platz towards Rudow
