= Maria Regina Martyrum =

Catholic church in Berlin, Germany

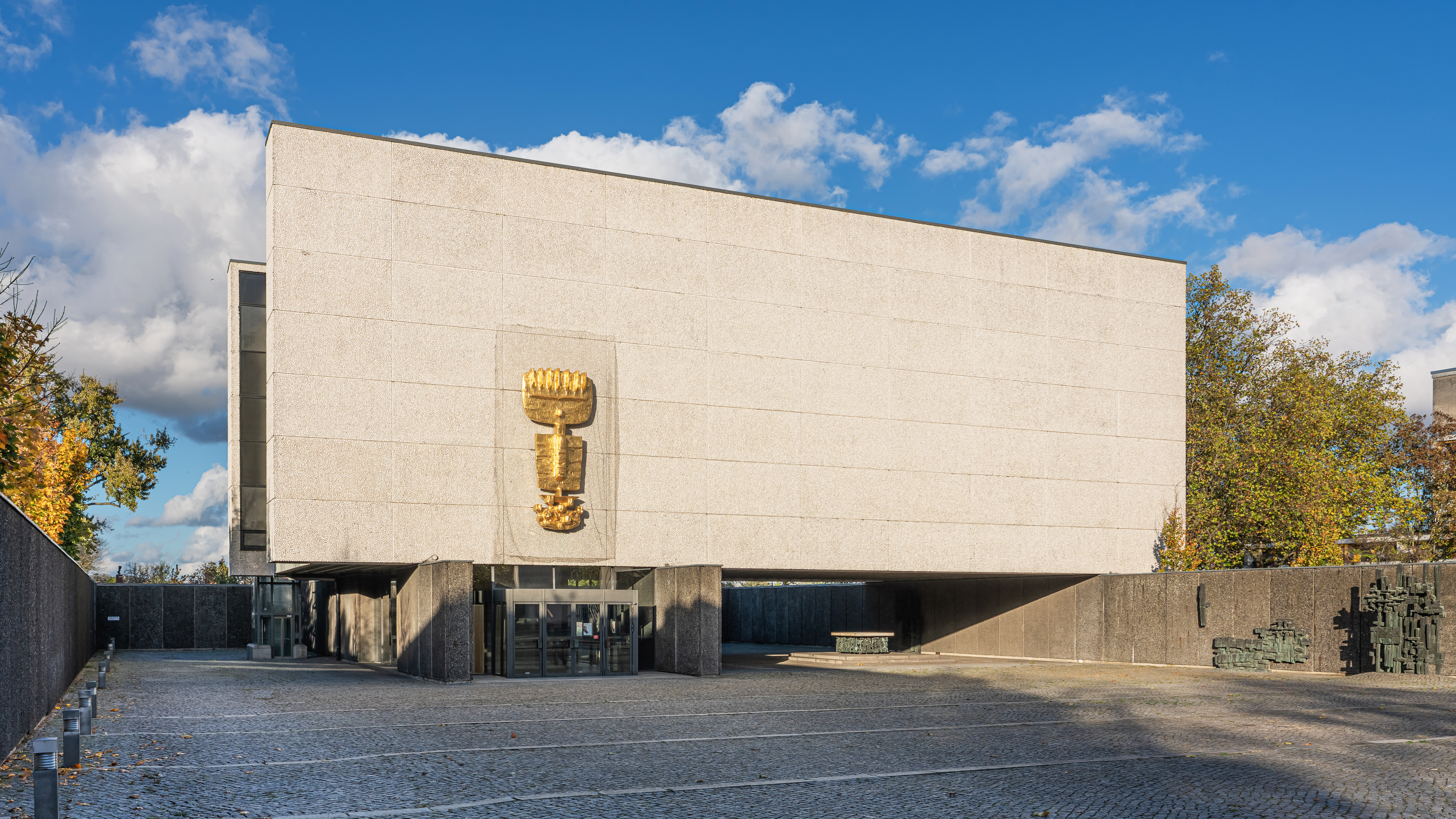
- Fritz Koenig's sculpture the Apocalyptic Woman on the façade of Maria Regina Martyrum

Religion
- Affiliation: Roman Catholic
- Diocese: Archdiocese of Berlin, Deanery of Spandau, St. Joseph parish
- Province: Ecclesiastical Province of Berlin (in German)
- Year consecrated: 5 May 1963

Location
- Location: Charlottenburg-Nord, a locality of Berlin
- Interactive map of Maria Regina Martyrum
- Coordinates: 52°32′25″N 13°17′55″E

Architecture
- Architects: Friedrich Ebert, Hermann Jünemann and Hans Schädel
- Completed: 1963
- Materials: concrete

Website
- gedenkkirche-berlin.de

Maria Regina Martyrum (German: Gedenkkirche Maria Regina Martyrum (actually Gedächtniskirche Maria Regina Martyrum der deutschen Katholiken zu Ehren der Blutzeugen für Glaubens- und Gewissensfreiheit in den Jahren 1933–1945) literally in English Commemorative church Mary Queen of Martyrs of the German catholics in honor of the martyrs for freedom of faith and conscience in the years 1933-1945) is a Roman Catholic church of the Roman Catholic Archdiocese of Berlin in Berlin, borough Charlottenburg-Wilmersdorf, in the locality of Charlottenburg-Nord. The church was built on behalf of the German Catholics to honour the Martyrs of Freedom of Belief and Conscience from the years 1933–1945. It is located 20 min of walk from the place of execution of Nazi resistants and opponents within the Plötzensee Prison, now the memorial Gedenkstätte Plötzensee.

== The church ==
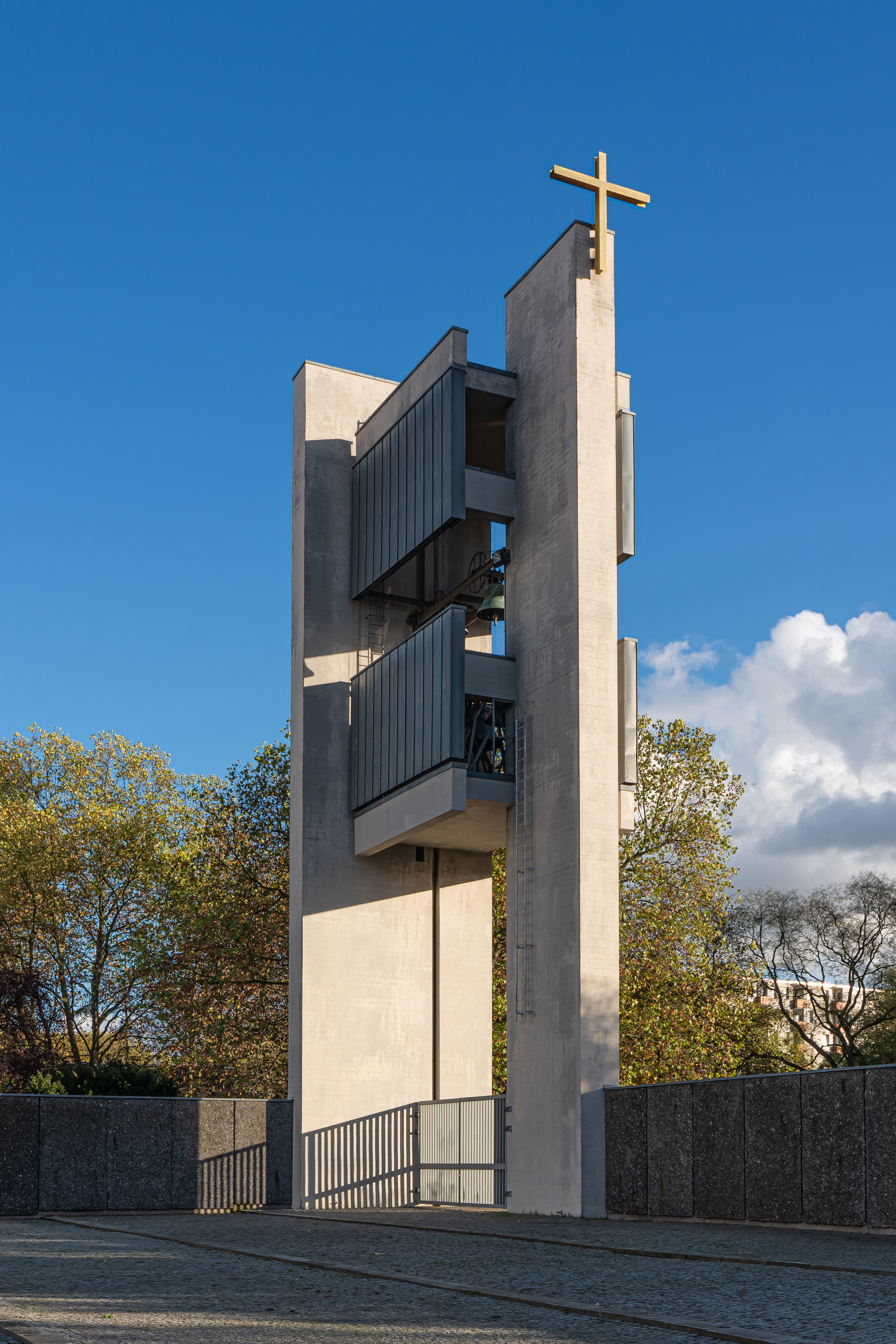
Maria Regina Martyrum – the campanile

The episcopal ordinariate of the then Roman Catholic Diocese of Berlin commissioned Friedrich Ebert, Hermann Jünemann and Hans Schädel to build the church. In 1960 Cardinal Julius Döpfner laid the cornerstone, and in 1963 he – together with Alfred Bengsch, then Catholic bishop of Berlin, and Louis-Marie-Fernand de Bazelaire, then Archbishop of Chambéry in France – consecrated the church. At that time, the church also served as a parochial church for the Catholic St. Joseph parish of Berlin-Spandau.

The campanile of Maria Regina Martyrum is a landmark at the entrance to the ceremonial courtyard, paved with cobblestone and surrounded by walls covered with slabs of black and grey basalt and showing figural Stations of the Cross. The sober interior of the upper church, covered by an even ceiling, impresses with its indirect illumination. The building is regarded an outstanding example of combining church architecture and sculpture.

The crypt, originally a single room, has been divided by a gold-coated wall of concrete. The front part is dedicated solely to the memory of the martyrs of that time, symbolised by three inscriptions. At the right grave the ashes of Erich Klausener are reposing, the first martyr of Berlin's Catholic diocese in the Nazi period. The left inscription is dedicated to Blessed Provost Bernhard Lichtenberg. His relics are in Maria Regina Martyrum throughout the time of the renovation of St. Hedwig's Cathedral. The middle, only symbolic, grave commemorates all those martyrs, whom the Nazis denied to have a grave. Discalced Carmelite nuns who live in the convent Regina Martyrum next to the church since 1984 pray the Liturgy of the Hours in the rear crypt.

Since March 2008 the commemorative church, which does not belong to a parish, is headed by a rector of the Jesuits.

== Furnishings ==
Upper church: A tripartite sculpture Apocalyptic Woman by Fritz Koenig is hanging on the long façade of the upper church. Inside on the altar wall there is a monumental fresco by Georg Meistermann. A seated wooden Madonna from southern France, created around 1320, is shown at the altar. In the confession chapel there is a sculpture of a Man of Sorrows from southern Germany, around second half of the 15th century. The Bonn-based organ constructor Johannes Klais created the organ on 5 May 1963.

Crypt: A memorial, graves of martyrs and a bronze Pietà of Fritz Koenig, which are dominating the room, are located in the middle of the front room of the crypt.

Ceremonial Court: Stations of the Cross from bronze and an open air altar by Otto Herbert Hajek, composed of two pillars from concrete, are flanking the entrance gate and the campanile. A bronze relief of Johannes Dumanski depicting the Holy Family at its Flight into Egypt decks the narrow side of the courtyard.

== The carmel ==
Theo Wieland and Klaus Worring built next to the church the Discalced Carmelite convent Regina Martyrum which was canoncially erected in 1984. It offers room for 24 nuns. The erection of the Carmelite convent was facilitated by the episcopal ordinariate.

== Ecumenical activities ==
There is a close Ecumenical cooperation with the nearby Protestant Church of Plötzensee, which is also designed as a memorial for the victims of National Socialism. This cooperation is especially dedicated to remember the martyrs of Plötzensee. The most important ecumenical memorial events of these churches are the Ecumenical Plötzensee Days every January and the annual anniversary of the assassination-attempt of 20 July 1944.
