= Eva Kreienkamp =

German manager

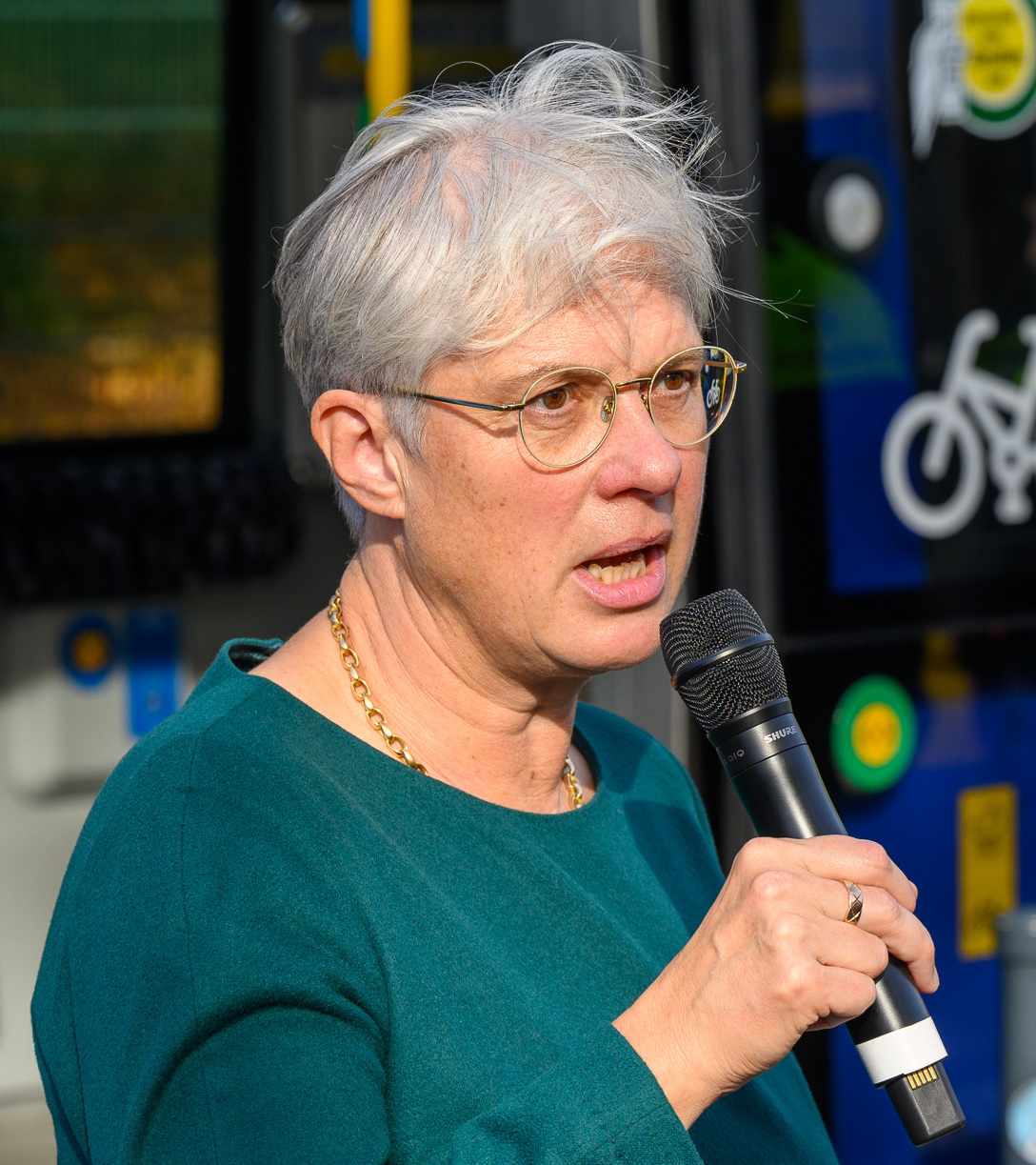

Eva Kreienkamp (born 10 August 1962) is a German manager and businesswoman. Between 2015 and 2020, Kreienkamp held the position of Co-Managing Director of the Mainzer Verkehrsgesellschaft. Since 2020 Kreienkamp has been the chairperson of the board of the Berliner Verkehrsbetriebe; she succeeded Sigrid Nikutta on 1 October 2020.

== Life ==
Eva Kreienkamp spent part of her school time in an Ursuline boarding school in Belgium, and she took her Abitur in Düsseldorf. From 1982 to 1989, Kreienkamp studied mathematics at the Heinrich Heine University Düsseldorf and LMU Munich. She began her career at the start-up Amadeus Data Process in Erding in 1989 as a trainee in a computer centre. Starting in 1991, she worked for ten years in the management of the Allianz insurance company, where her last position was Senior Vice President. She then worked for Berlinwasser Holding AG and Berlikomm Telekommunikationsgesellschaft from 2002 to 2003. As early as 2001, Kreienkamp founded FrischCo., a gender and diversity marketing and market research company, together with her wife and another partner.

In 2009, Kreienkamp moved to the transport sector and took over first the financial management and then the management of the private railway company Hamburg-Köln-Express (HKX) / RDC Deutschland GmbH. In 2014, both sides parted ways by mutual agreement and after a time-out, she moved to Mainzer Verkehrsgesellschaft. Among other things, she was responsible for the transport concept "Mainzer Mobilität 2030." As Co-Managing Director, she was also responsible for the areas of driving personnel, commercial functions, digitalization and infrastructure projects. At the same time, she was also managing director of CityBahn GmbH for the construction of a tram line between Mainz and Wiesbaden.

In April 2020, the Berlin Senator for Economics, Energy and Operations, Ramona Pop, announced that Kreienkamp would succeed Sigrid Nikutta, who retired as CEO of Berliner Verkehrsbetriebe in 2019.

== Activism ==
Kreienkamp was already involved in the Alliance for More Diversity in the Company in the 1990s, and in 1995 she founded an LGBT network there. She is also a co-founder of the network of businesswomen and the association FidAR – Frauen in die Aufsichtsräte. In 2006, Kreienkamp organized the "1st International Gender Marketing Congress."

In 2019, she took first place in "Germany's Top 100 Out Executives", a ranking of successful people in management who identify as lesbian, gay, transgender, intersex, or bisexual. She had already taken second place in the ranking the year before.

== Publications ==
- Eva Kreienkamp: Gender-Marketing: Impulse für Marktforschung, Produkte, Werbung und Personalentwicklung. Mi-Fachverlag, Landsberg am Lech 2007, ISBN 978-3-636-03108-2.
- Eva Kreienkamp, Gerda Frisch, Julia Gabrysch: Frauen und ihre Altersversorgung. Auswirkungen der ökonomischen Emanzipation auf Finanzstatus und -verhalten von Frauen. Deutsches Institut für Altersversorgung, Köln 2010, ISBN 978-3-934446-39-7.
