= Protestant Church of Plötzensee =

Coordinates: 52°32′22″N 13°18′00″E

The Protestant Church of Plötzensee (German: Gemeindezentrum Plötzensee) is situated in Berlin-Charlottenburg-Nord and was inaugurated in 1970 as the second church building of the Protestant Congregation in North-Charlottenburg within the Evangelical Church of Berlin-Brandenburg-Silesian Upper Lusatia. As it is located close to the former Plötzensee Prison, the church-building was designed as a memorial for the victims of National Socialism. The paintings Plötzenseer Totentanz (Plötzensee Danse Macabre) painted by the Viennese artist Alfred Hrdlicka are an important part of this church.

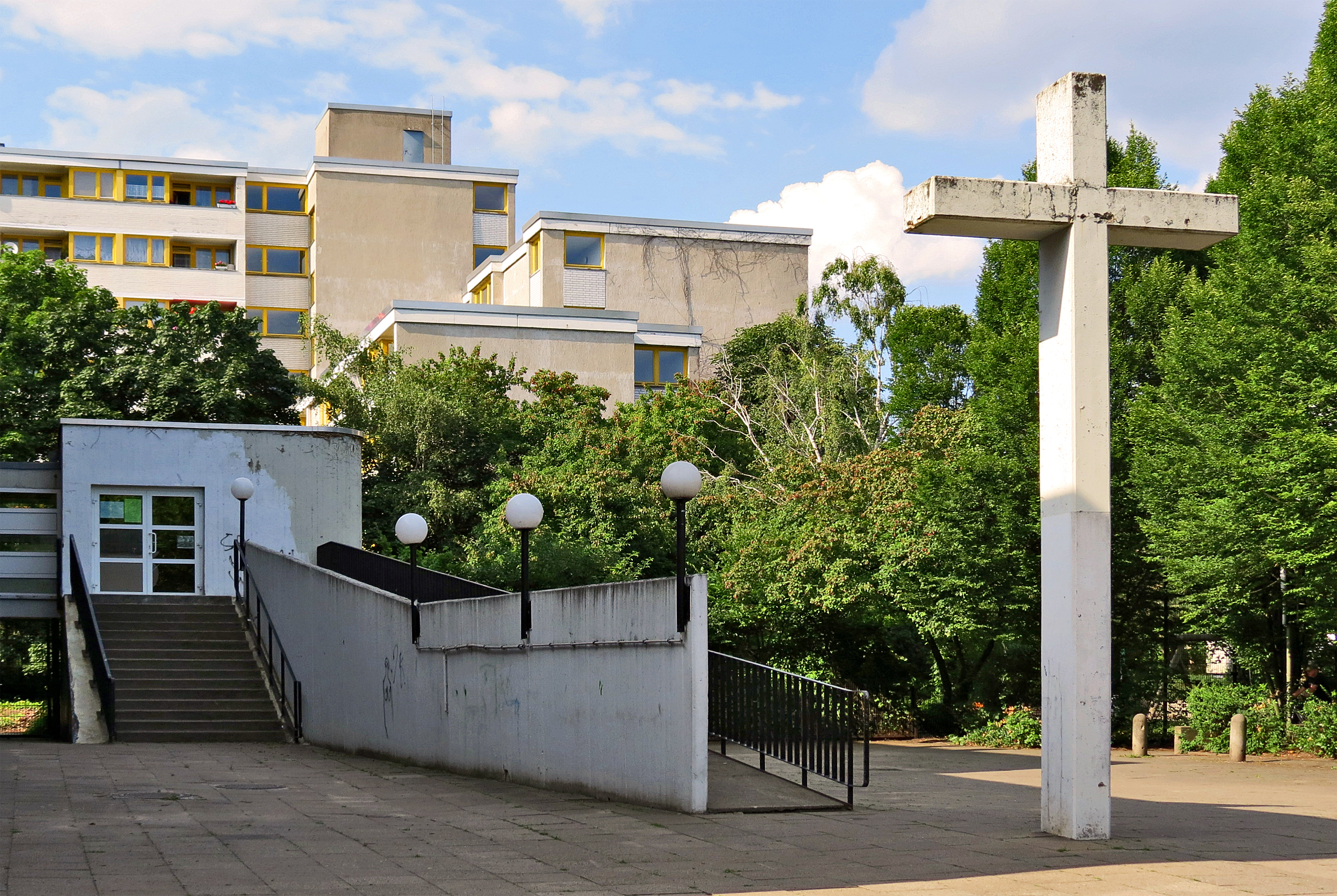
The Gemeindezentrum Plötzensee

== Building and architecture ==
The church and the church-centre were built in the years between 1968 and 1970 for congregants living in the recently built Paul-Hertz-settlement in this area. The architects Gerd Neumann, Dietmar Grötzebach and Günther Plessow created the buildings, which include a church, a day-care facility for children, a youth centre, apartments, offices and other rooms for congregational use.

The church premises were designed as a place of memorial from the beginning. Alfred Hrdlicka created the Dance of Death of Plötzensee, which shows motifs similar to medieval dances of death on 16 boards. The paintings point at today's threats by violence, power and arbitrary.

The architecture shows influences of ideas that came up during a reform-period of the Protestant church in Germany during the 1960s: the benches are arranged in a square (quadrangle) around the altar in the centre. This was meant to create a feeling of community among those who worship in here and to involve them more intensely in the service. Almost contradicting to this intention the architecture of the church refers to the prisons of Plötzensee: the cupola made of concrete reminds the worshiper of a prison cell; light comes only from a single window right above the altar.

== Ecumenical activities ==
There is a close Ecumenical cooperation with the nearby Roman Catholic memorial church Maria Regina Martyrum and the Carmelite monastery adjunct to it. This cooperation is especially dedicated to remember the martyrs of Plötzensee. The most important ecumenical memorial events of these churches are the Ecumenical Plötzensee Days every January and the annual anniversary of the assassination-attempt of 20 July 1944. In summer 2009 the Ecumenical Memorial Centre Plötzensee - Christians and Resistance has been founded in the Protestant Church of Plötzensee.

== Literature ==
- Bringfried Naumann: Der Plötzenseer Totentanz im Evangelischen Gemeindezentrum Plötzensee. 2. Auflage 1993 (Verlag Schnell & Steiner, Reihe: Der Kleine Kunstführer), ISBN 978-3-7954-5026-7 (in German)
- Rüdiger von Voss and Gerhard Ringshausen: Die Predigten von Plötzensee. Zur Herausforderung des modernen Märtyrers. Lukas Verlag: Berlin 2009, ISBN 978-3-86732-064-1 (in German)
- I. Mössinger/U. Saltin: Die ökumenische Gedenk-Region Charlottenburg-Nord/Plötzensee: Alfred Hrdlickas "Plötzenseer Totentanz". In: Reiner Albert, Roland Hartung, Günther Saltin (Hg.): Alfred-Delp-Jahrbuch Band 3/2009. Alfred Delp und die Kunst, LIT Verlag 2009, ISBN 978-3-643-10148-8 (in German)
