= Ecumenical Plötzensee Days =

The Ecumenical Plötzensee Days (German: Ökumenische Plötzenseer Tage) are an annual event, commemorating martyrs and victims of National Socialism. They take place at the catholic commemoration church Maria Regina Martyrum and at the Protestant Church of Plötzensee.

The events take place around January 23, Helmuth James Graf von Moltke's day of death, and January 27, the International Holocaust Remembrance Day. Besides cultural programs as performances of opera, concerts or theater, lectures and vespers are fixed parts in the calendar of events.

Clarita von Trott zu Solz, Rosemarie Reichwein (1992), Bishop Albrecht Schönherr (1996), Friedrich-Wilhelm Marquardt (1998), Jizchak Schwersenz (1999), Günter Brakelmann (2009) and Andreas Maislinger have been lecturing or preaching among others.

== Topics ==
- 1992: The Kreisau Circle and its meaning today
- 1993: Renate Wind: „Dem Rad in die Speichen fallen“ – Dietrich Bonhoeffer
- 1994: Friedrich Georgi: „Wir haben das Letzte gewagt“; Wörmann: „Widerstand in Charlottenburg“
- 1995: Helmuth James Graf von Moltke’s 50th anniversary of death
- 1996: Dietrich Bonhoeffer and the preaching seminar in Finkenwalde
- 1997: Sigrid Jacobeit: Ravensbrück
- 1998: Being Christian after Auschwitz
- 1999: Jizchak Schwersenz
- 2000: Hans Krasa: Brundibár
- 2002: Ecumenical Vespers
- 2003: Harald Poelchau
- 2005: "60 years later"
- 2006: Dietrich Bonhoeffer’s 100th birthday
- 2007: "Mother Marija Skobtsova – Martyr of Ravensbrück"
- 2008: "Locations of audacity" („Silent heroes")
- 2009: Helmuth James von Moltke – in the land of godless people.
- 2010: Franz Jägerstätter
