= Paulsternstraße station =

Station of the Berlin U-Bahn

Coordinates: 52°32′17″N 13°14′52″E

Berlin U-Bahn station Paulsternstraße

Paulsternstraße is a station on the Berlin U-Bahn line U7. It was opened on 1 October 1984 (constructed by Rümmler), with the line's extension from Rohrdamm to Rathaus Spandau. Its name means "Paul Stern Street" in English, Paul Stern having been the name of a pub owner after whom a Spandau neighbourhood was named. The station's interiors are notable for the large and colorful mosaics which decorate almost all walls. All signs spell "Paulsternstrasse".

It lies between the stations Haselhorst and Rohrdamm.

The Paulsternstraße is also a street in Berlin, Spandau. The walls are covered with pictures of flowers, grass and sunpatterns. The ceiling is also covered with stars. The next station is Rohrdamm.

Preceding station	Berlin U-Bahn	Following station
Haselhorst towards Rathaus Spandau	U7	Rohrdamm towards Rudow
