= Rohrdamm station =

Station of the Berlin U-Bahn

Coordinates: 52°32′14″N 13°15′45″E

Platform view

Tubes and cogwheels refer to the surrounding industry

Rohrdamm is a station on the Berlin U-Bahn line U7 in the Siemensstadt district.

Designed by architect Rümmler, the station was opened on 1 October 1980, as part of the line's extension from Richard-Wagner-Platz to Rohrdamm. Until the second extension of the line from Rohrdamm to Rathaus Spandau in 1984, it was the western terminus of the U7. The name literally means "pipe dam"; as the eponymous street was laid out along a water pipe which gets its water from the Tegeler See and fills the water works in Jungfernheide, from which about 250,000 people get drinking water. The station's machine-like decoration, featuring cog-wheels and pipes, points to this. The adjacent stations are Paulsternstraße and Siemensdamm.

Preceding station	Berlin U-Bahn	Following station
Paulsternstraße towards Rathaus Spandau	U7	Siemensdamm towards Rudow
