= Berliner Verkehrsbetriebe =

Public transport company in Berlin, Germany

Coordinates: 52°29′31″N 13°21′35″E

Berliner Verkehrsbetriebe (BVG)
- Type: State-owned
- Industry: passenger transport
- Founded: 1928
- Headquarters: Berlin, Germany
- Area served: Berlin
- Key people: Henrik Falk (CEO)
- Services: Public transport
- Owner: State of Berlin (100%)
- Number of employees: 15,578 (as of 31 December 2023)
- Website: www.bvg.de

The Berliner Verkehrsbetriebe (lit. 'Berlin Transport Company') is the main public transport company of Berlin, the capital of Germany. It operates the city's U-Bahn (underground), tram, bus, replacement services and ferry networks — while the S-Bahn, Berlin's suburban rail network, is operated separately from BVG.

The abbreviation BVG derives from the company's original name, Berliner Verkehrs-Aktiengesellschaft ("Berlin Transport Stock Company"). During the division of Berlin, the company was split into separate operators: BVG in West Berlin and BVB in East Berlin. Following German reunification, the two networks were merged under the present-day Berliner Verkehrsbetriebe name.

== History ==
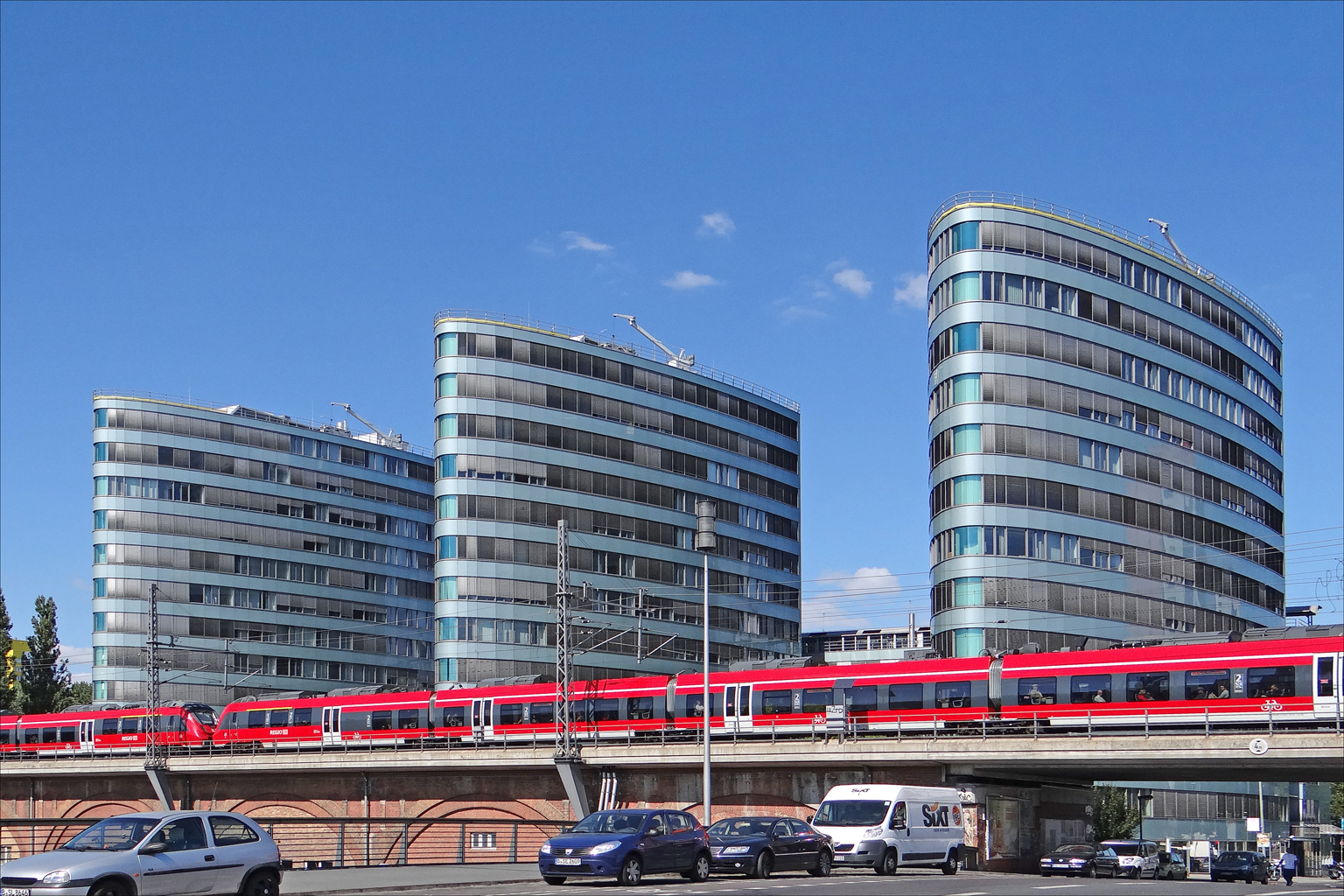
"Trias", headquarter since 2008

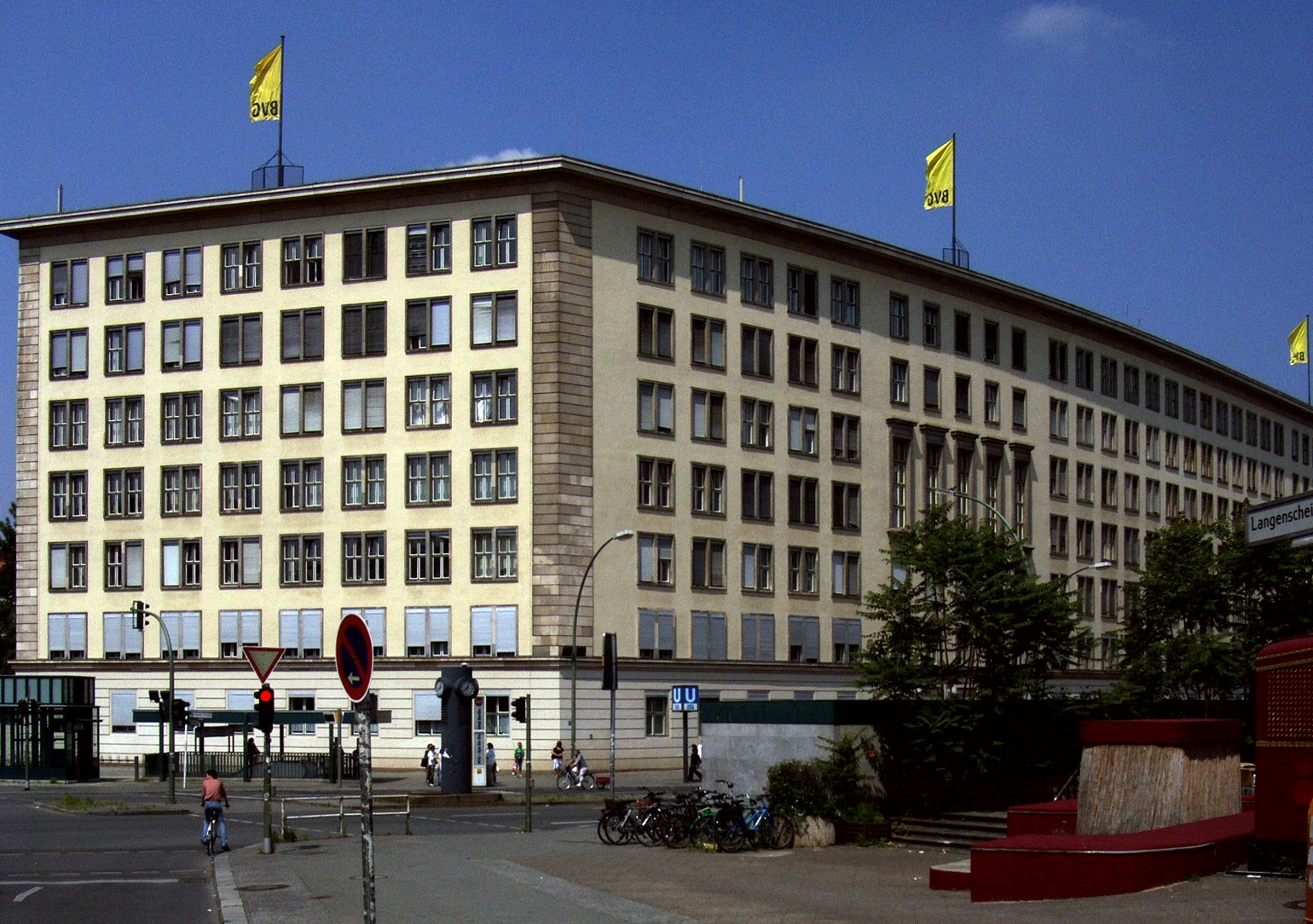
Former BVG headquarters on Potsdamer Straße

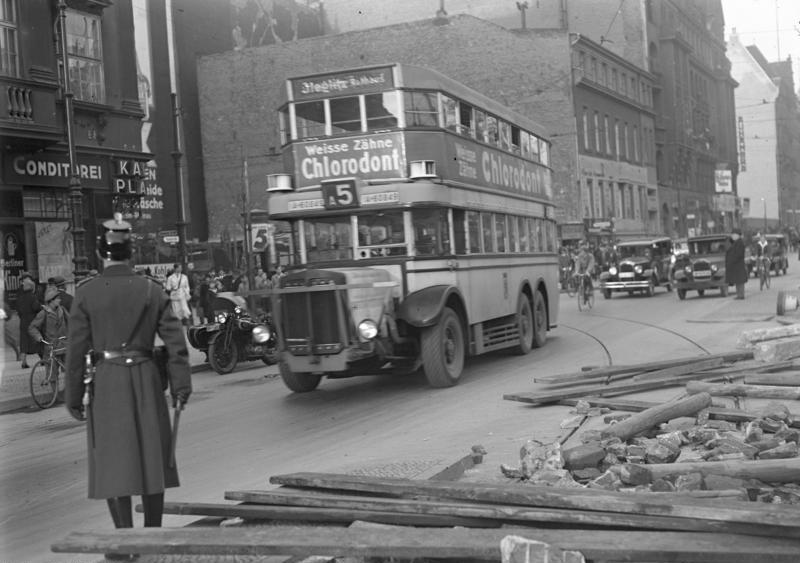
A Berlin bus during the strikes of 1932

The Berliner Verkehrs Aktiengesellschaft was formed in 1928, by the merger of the Allgemeine Berliner Omnibus AG (the operator of the city's buses), the Gesellschaft für Elektrische Hoch- und Untergrundbahnen (the operator of the U-Bahn) and the Berliner Straßenbahn-Betriebs-GmbH (the operator of the city's trams). On 1 January 1938, the company was renamed Berliner Verkehrs-Betriebe, but the acronym BVG was retained.

In 1933, the State Commissioner for Berlin, Julius Lippert, appointed the NSDAP politician and later Waffen SS soldier Johannes Engel as head of the BVG Supervisory Board. The board of directors and most of the senior staff were dismissed or disempowered. During World War II, the BVG used some 4000 forced laborers, for whom the company built its own barracks camp.

From 1 August 1949, the BVG networks in West Berlin and East Berlin were operated separately. The two operators were originally known as BVG (West) and BVG (Ost), but from 1 January 1969 the eastern operator was renamed as the Kombinat Berliner Verkehrsbetriebe or BVB. After the reunification of Berlin, the two operators were recombined into the Berliner Verkehrsbetriebe on 1 January 1992.

Prior to the division of Berlin, tram lines existed throughout the city, but BVG (West) abandoned all the tram lines in its part of the city, replacing them all by buses by 1967. However BVG (Ost) retained its tram lines, and on the reunification of Berlin the BVG inherited a considerable network of routes in the eastern half of Berlin.

On 9 January 1984, BVG (West) took over the responsibility for operation of the S-Bahn services in West Berlin. This urban rail network had previously been operated in both halves of Berlin by the Deutsche Reichsbahn, the state rail operator of East Germany, but had been subject to a boycott in the west after the building of the Berlin Wall. With the reunification of Berlin, responsibility for the S-Bahn reverted to Deutsche Bahn AG (DBAG), the state rail operator of Germany. The S-Bahn is currently managed by the S-Bahn Berlin GmbH, a subsidiary company of DBAG.

BVG (West) also took part in the Berlin M-Bahn project, an urban maglev system, in the period between 1984 and 1992. The project used a section of the U-Bahn right of way that was out of service due to the building of the Berlin Wall, and was dropped with the fall of that wall.

The BVG launched the MetroNetz on 12 December 2004 which remodeled the tram and bus network to create 24 tram and bus lines (with M prefix) covering parts of the city that weren't served by S-Bahn or U-Bahn.

In September 2019, BVG launched Jelbi, a mobility-as-a-service platform developed together with Lithuanian mobility technology company Trafi. The platform integrates BVG services with shared mobility providers, including car sharing, bike sharing and e-scooter services.

During the 2020s, BVG continued the modernization of its fleet and infrastructure. The company expanded its electric bus fleet and charging infrastructure, and introduced new generations of U-Bahn trains to replace older vehicles.

== Chief executive officers ==
Name	From	To
Fritz Brolat	1929	1931
Ernst Lüdtke	1929	1933
Wilhelm Majerczik	1929	1930
Gotthard Quarg	1929	1933
Hermann Zangemeister	1929	1933
Wilhelm Bennighoff	1933	1938
Georg Thomas	1933	1934
Max Reschke	1934	1937
Alfred Lorenz	1935	1938
Otto Ulmer	1937	1945
Max Mroß	1939	1945
Franz Fink	1939	1945
Walter Schneider	1945	1963
Wilhelm Knapp	1945	1949 (Went to BVG-Ost)
Walter Struwe	1945	1970
Johannes Warnke	1945	1960
Fritz Neubecker	1947	1968
Richard Timm	1952	1958
Karl König	1960	1965
Heinz Goltz	1971	1975
Joachim Piefke "Der Mann mit der Fliege"	1971	1986
Bruno Frank	1972	1982
Hans-Erhardt von Knoblauch	1977	1986
Willi Diedrich	1980	1988
Harro Sachße	1983	1994
Helmut Döpfer	1986	
Konrad Lorenzen	1988	1994
Rüdiger vorm Walde	1994	2001
Andreas Graf von Arnim	2002	2005
Andreas Sturmowski	2005	2010
Sigrid Evelyn Nikutta	2010	2019
Eva Kreienkamp	2020	2023
Henrik Falk	2024	

== Operations ==
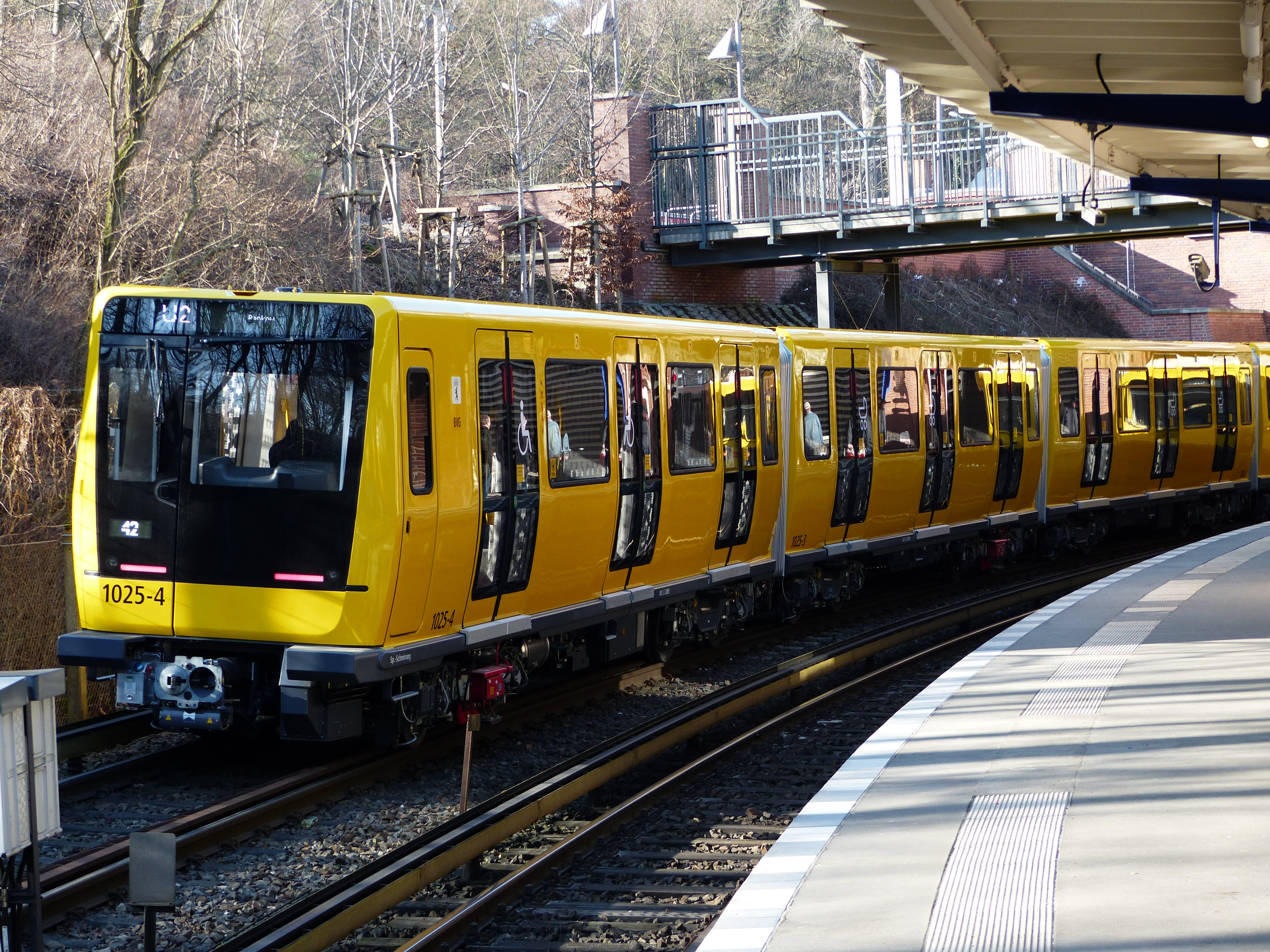
The second latest model of Berlin's U-Bahn called Icke in Olympia-Stadion U-Bahn station (2015)

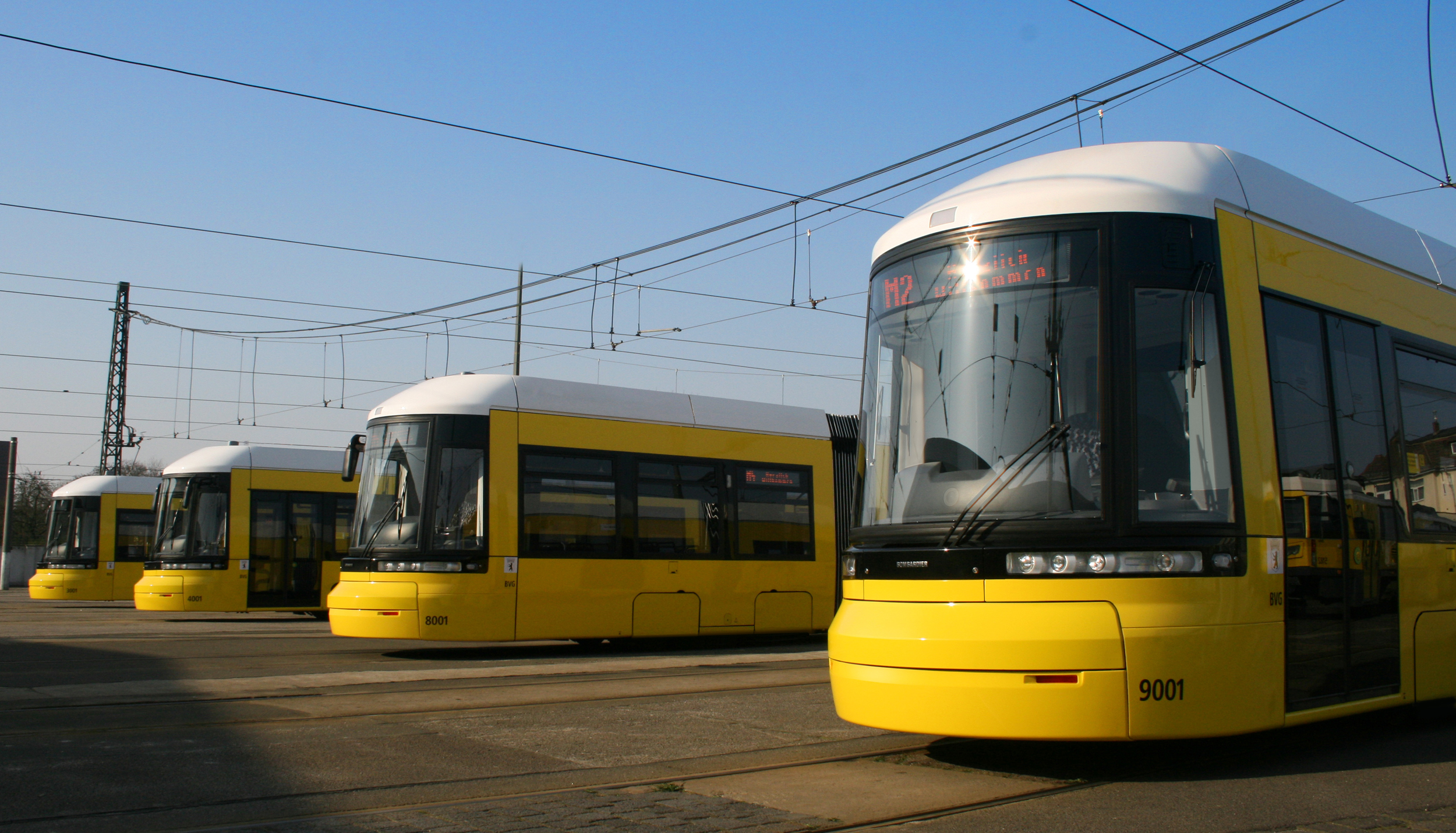
Berlin trams model Flexity (2009)

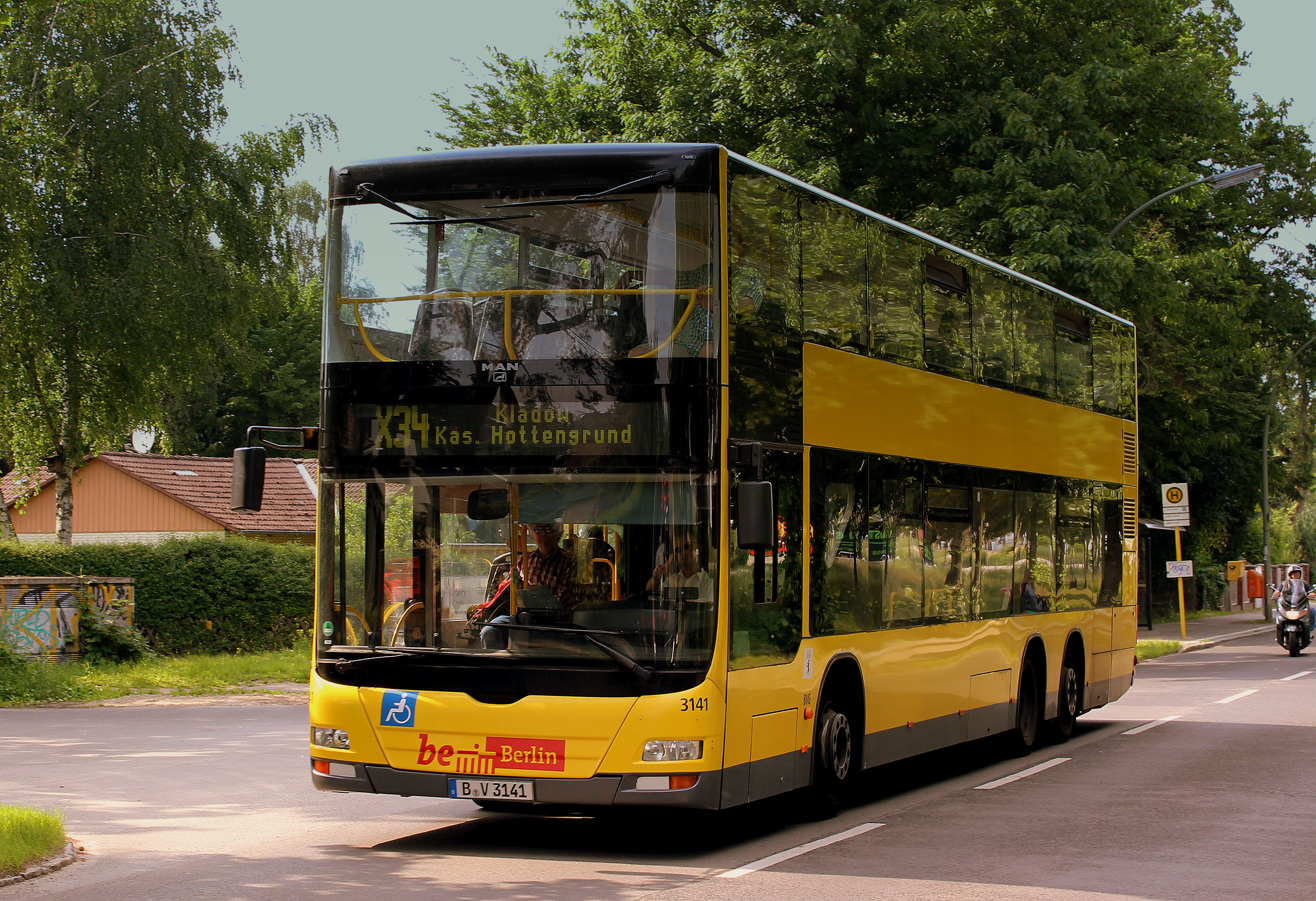
A Berlin double-decker bus (2005)

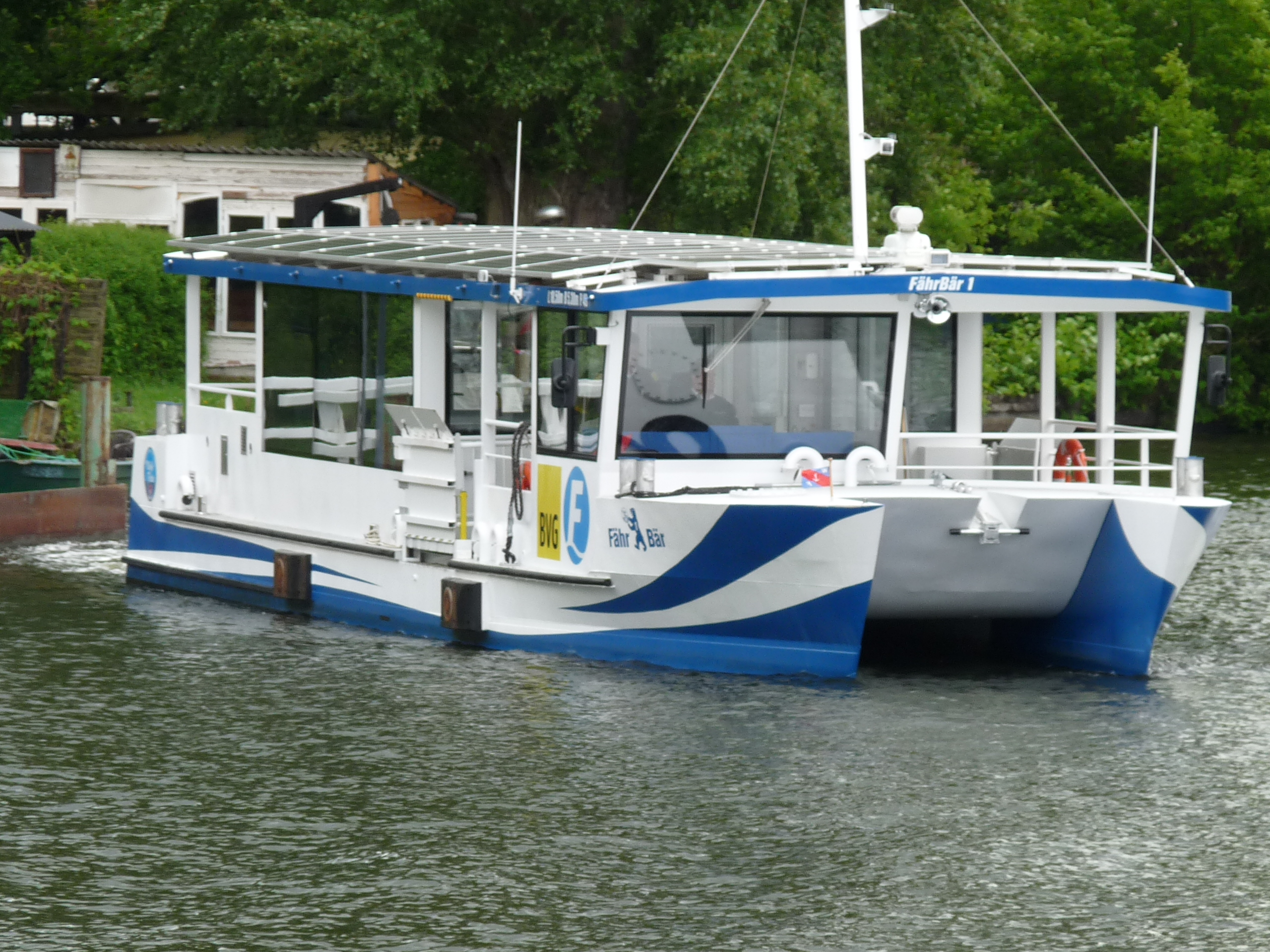
A zero-emission BVG ferry (2014)

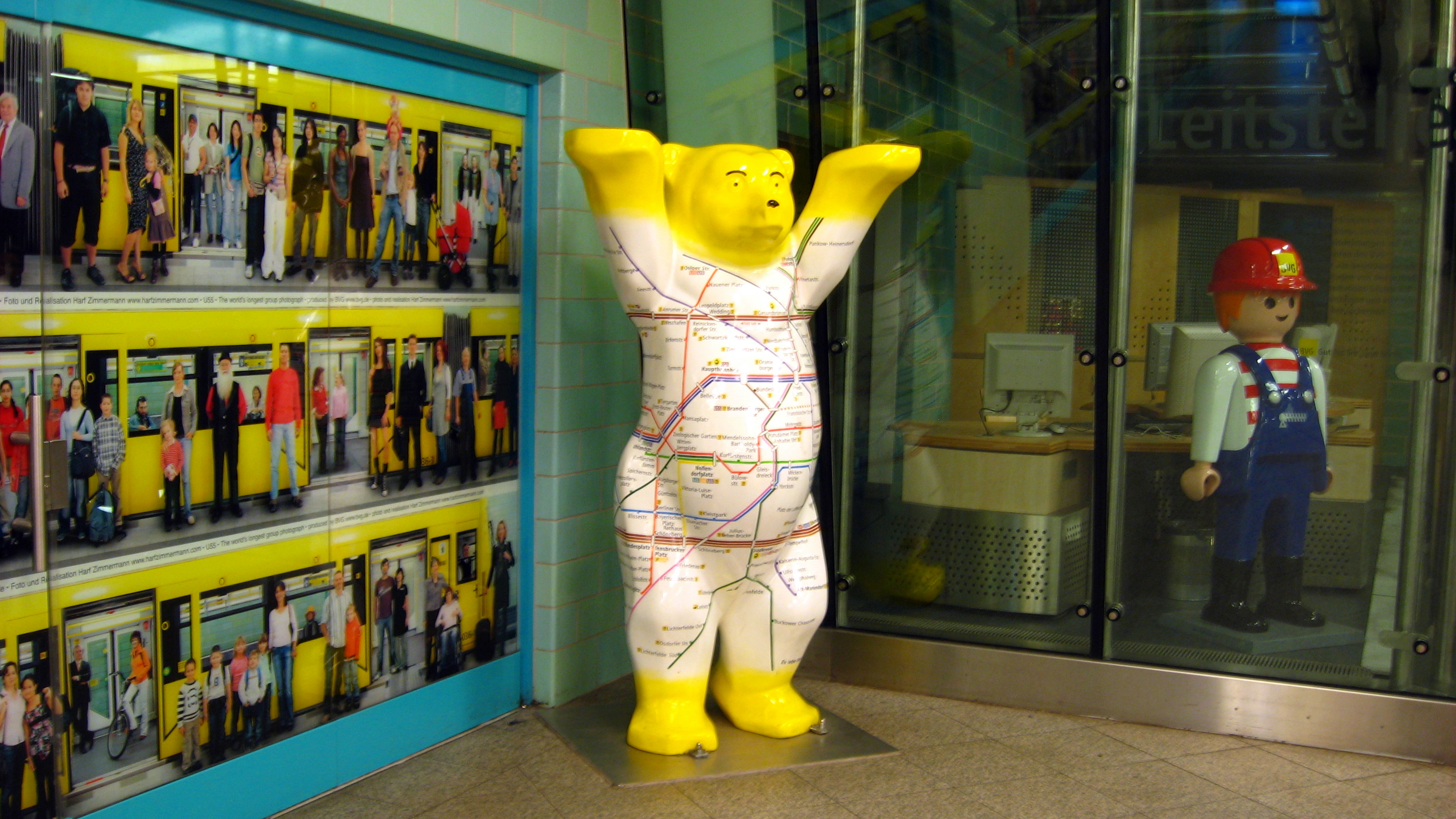
Metro-Bear-Berlin: This Buddy Bear with its map of the Berlin U-Bahn can be found in the Alexanderplatz station.

=== U-Bahn ===
BVG operates the U-Bahn, the city's rapid transit system. As of the end of 2025, the network comprised nine lines, 175 stations and a total length of 155.4 kilometres (96.6 mi). Its fleet consisted of 1,216 vehicles, including 764 for the larger-profile (Großprofil) network and 452 for the smaller-profile (Kleinprofil) network. In 2025, the U-Bahn accounted for 556.4 million passenger journeys.

=== Trams ===
BVG operates Berlin's tram network, which comprised 22 daytime lines with a combined line length of 320 kilometres (200 mi). Nine of the lines are designated as MetroTram services, identified by an M prefix; they operate 24 hours a day and generally provide more frequent service than the other tram lines.

In 2025, trams accounted for 210.6 million passenger journeys.

The network is concentrated in the former East Berlin, reflecting the different transport policies pursued during the city's division. Tram services in West Berlin were progressively discontinued and ended in 1967, while the East Berlin operator continued to develop its tram network. Since German reunification, the network has expanded into parts of the former West Berlin, including an extension to Berlin Hauptbahnhof in 2015 and the extension to Turmstraße in 2023.

=== Buses ===
BVG operates a bus network of 155 daytime lines with a combined length of 1,819 kilometres (1,130 mi), together with 68 night lines. The network includes 19 MetroBus routes, designated by an M prefix, which provide frequent service on major routes and operate around the clock. Fifteen express routes, designated by an X prefix, provide faster connections over longer distances by serving only selected stops. Night bus routes use an N prefix and, on nights when the U-Bahn does not operate, routes N1–N9 provide overnight service along the corresponding U-Bahn corridors.

By the end of 2025, BVG's bus fleet comprised 1,532 vehicles, including 199 double-decker buses and 277 electric buses. BVG is progressively electrifying its bus fleet, with the aim of operating an entirely emissions-free fleet by the early 2030s.

=== Ferries ===
BVG's public transport network includes six passenger ferry routes across Berlin's rivers and lakes. Three operate year-round, while the other three operate seasonally. Most operate in southeastern Berlin, while one route, F10, crosses the Havel between Wannsee and Kladow in southwestern Berlin. The ferries form part of the regular public transport network and can be used with VBB tickets.

=== Service ===
In 2021 a Petition was started against "discrimination and violence by security personnel in public transport" under the hashtag #BVGWeilWirUnsFürchten. In the last decades there have been repeated uses of violence for seemingly racist reasons, as well as racist insults.

== Fares ==
BVG is a member of the Verkehrsverbund Berlin-Brandenburg (VBB), the public transport association for Berlin and Brandenburg. The VBB coordinates a common fare system across participating transport operators, allowing passengers to use the same ticket on BVG services and other local public transport within the fare zones for which it is valid.

Berlin is divided into three fare zones. Zone A covers the city centre up to and including the S-Bahn Ring, while zone B extends from the Ring to the Berlin city boundary. Zone C covers the surrounding area, extending approximately 15 kilometres (9.3 mi) beyond the Berlin state boundary and including Potsdam and Berlin Brandenburg Airport. Tickets are generally issued for the combined zones AB, BC or ABC.

== Media ==
From 1996 until 2023, BVG published the customer magazine PLUS, which provided information about public transport and events in Berlin and was distributed free of charge. It was discontinued after 325 issues as BVG increasingly shifted passenger information to digital channels.

== Subsidiaries ==
BVG operates several subsidiaries supporting its transport operations and related activities. The holding company BVG Beteiligungsholding GmbH & Co. KG (BBH) manages BVG's investments and provides administrative and commercial services for affiliated companies.

The most significant subsidiary is BT Berlin Transport GmbH, which provides bus services and other transport-related services on behalf of BVG. URBANIS GmbH manages commercial uses of BVG-owned spaces, particularly retail and advertising areas in Berlin U-Bahn stations. IOB Internationale Omnibusbahnhof-Betreibergesellschaft mbH operates the Zentraler Omnibusbahnhof Berlin (ZOB), Berlin's central bus station, on behalf of BVG. BVG-Fahrzeugfinanzierungsgesellschaft mbH supports the financing and procurement of rail vehicles for BVG.

== See also ==
- Transport in Berlin
