= Spandau Town Hall =

City hall in Spandau, Berlin, Germany

- Rathaus Spandau
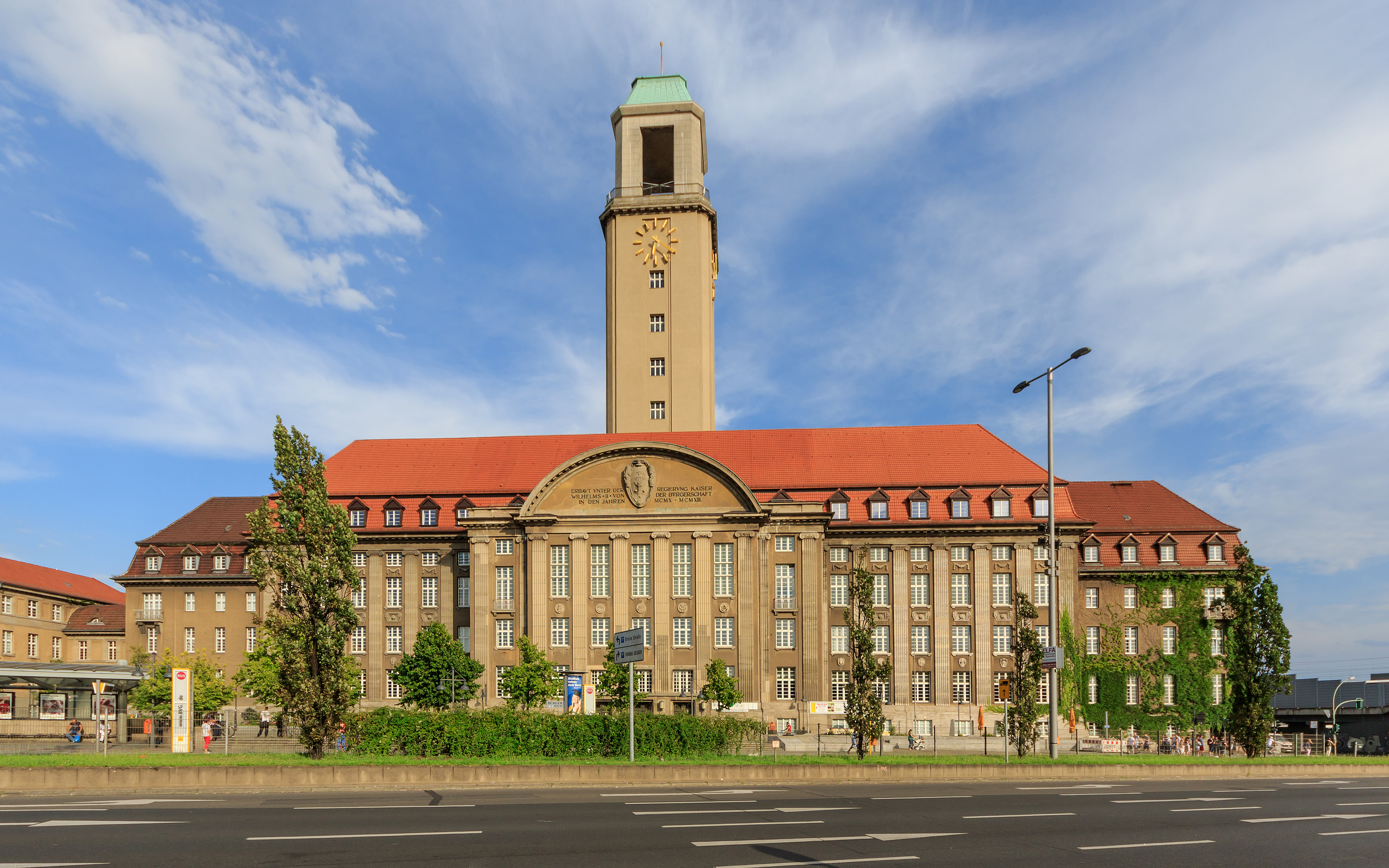
- The main frontage of the town hall in July 2017

General information
- Type: City hall
- Architectural style: Baroque Revival style
- Location: Spandau, Berlin, Germany
- Coordinates: 52.5350°N 13.2006°E
- Construction started: 1911
- Completed: 1913

Height
- Height: 80 metres (260 ft)

Design and construction
- Architects: Heinrich Reinhardt and Georg Süßenguth

Spandau Town Hall (German: Rathaus Spandau) is a municipal building in Spandau, Berlin, in eastern Germany, standing on Carl-Schurz-Straße.

== History ==
The interior

The first town hall in Spandau was a medieval structure in the Market Place in Altstadt Spandau. After it was destroyed by French forces during the German campaign of 1813, the town council commissioned a new town hall. The site they selected was on the southwest side of the Market Place. It was designed in the neoclassical style, built in ashlar stone and was completed in 1818. The design involved a symmetrical main frontage of seven bays facing onto the Market Place. The central section of three bays, which was slightly projected forward, featured a Doric order portico on the ground floor, three segmental-headed windows on the first floor and three round-headed windows on the second floor, with a clock above. The other bays were fenestrated by square-headed windows on the ground floor, by square-headed windows with cornices on the first floor, and by round-headed windows with cornices on the second floor. After the building was demolished in 1929, the site was later occupied by a branch of the Berliner Volksbank.

In 1908, after finding the old town hall cramped, the council led by the mayor, Friedrich Koeltze, decided to commission a new town hall. The site they selected was near one of the city bastions. The foundation stone for the new building was laid in April 1911. It was designed by Heinrich Reinhardt and Georg Süßenguth in the Baroque Revival style, built in sandstone and was officially opened on 15 September 1913.

The design involved a symmetrical main frontage of 27 bays facing onto Carl-Schurz-Straße. The main block of 19 bays, which was projected forward, incorporated an extra storey. The central section of seven bays was further projected forward and featured three square-headed doorways on the ground floor and a huge semi-circular modillioned pediment spanning the central five bays, with a coat of arms in the tympanum. The building was fenestrated by casement windows on four floors and by dormer windows at attic level. Behind the pediment, there was a huge square clock tower which was 80 metres (260 ft) high.

Spandau, which at the time of construction of the building had been an independent city (German: Stadtkreis), was incorporated into Greater Berlin in 1920. The building was heavily damaged by the allied bombing of Berlin in the Second World War. After Soviet troops captured the building, during the Battle of Berlin, two German Tiger II tanks fired shells at the tower. The building was restored to the original plans in the 1950s. Following the 2001 Berlin administrative reform, it became the town hall for the newly constituted borough of Spandau.
