= Rathaus Spandau station =

Station of the Berlin U-Bahn

Coordinates: 52°32′06″N 13°12′01″E

Rathaus Spandau
- Platform view of Rathaus Spandau

General information
- Owner: Berliner Verkehrsbetriebe
- Operator: Berliner Verkehrsbetriebe
- Platforms: 2
- Tracks: 4
- Train operators: Berliner Verkehrsbetriebe
- Connections: S3 S9

Construction
- Structure type: Underground

Other information
- Fare zone: VBB: Berlin B/5656

History
- Opened: 1 October 1984; 42 years ago

Services
Preceding station	Berlin U-Bahn	Following station
Terminus	U7	Altstadt Spandau towards Rudow
Location

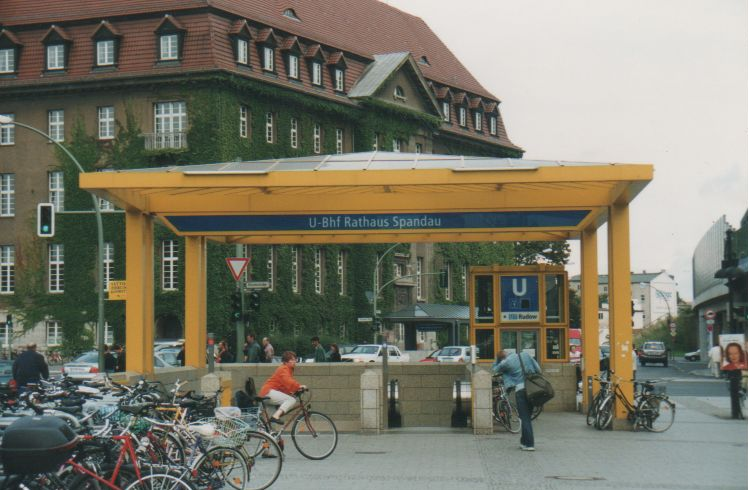
Entrance to the U-Bahn station, which is named after Spandau townhall, seen behind

Rathaus Spandau (Spandau Town Hall) is the western terminus of Berlin U-Bahn line U7 (the Eastern one being Rudow). It was opened on 1 October 1984 with the line's extension from Rohrdamm to Rathaus Spandau. The station takes its name from the nearby Rathaus Spandau, the historic city hall of Spandau.

Close to the U-Bahn station Rathaus Spandau is the Berlin-Spandau station of the Berlin S-Bahn lines S3 and S9 and the Deutsche Bahn for regional and intercity transport. The next station on the U7 line is Altstadt Spandau.

The station was built in a box under a cover in order to minimise the disturbance of surface traffic. With its two island platforms, the station, which was designed by Rainer G. Rümmler, has almost monumental dimensions. It has a big hall with high ceilings, much light and 64 lamps, columns with black granite and a parquet-floor-like floor. The southern end of its platforms is spanned by a gallery for the movement of passengers to the surface and from which the entire station can be seen. The U-Bahn station also includes a signal control centre for the line to Paulsternstraße.

U-Bahn line U7 uses the inner tracks, which are built for large profile trains, while the track beds of the outer tracks, which are built for the operation of small profile trains on a planned extension of the U-Bahn line U2, which currently runs only as far as Ruhleben, are currently empty. Uniquely for the Berlin U-Bahn, this line would run to the left of the platforms to improve interchanges for the planned extensions of the U7 to Staaken and the U2 to Falkenhagener Feld. An extension of the U7 south to Heerstraße is currently being planned, with a projected completion date in the mid-2030s. In 2021, the 4.26 km, 5-station extension was projected to cost €578 million.

Although the station is very close to Spandau S-Bahn station, it has kept its name. Nevertheless, Berliner Verkehrsbetriebe buses always show the destination as S+U Rathaus Spandau, but the S-Bahn station is only signed as Spandau.
