= Marienfelde station =

Railway station in Berlin, Germany

Berlin Marienfelde
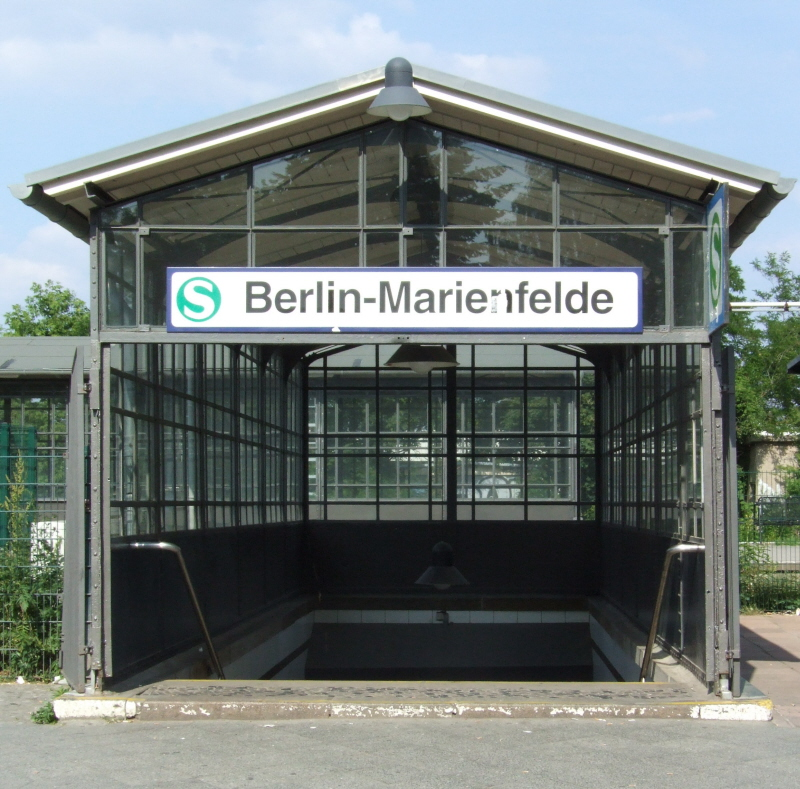
- Station entrance

General information
- Location: Marienfelder Allee, Marienfelde, Tempelhof-Schöneberg, Berlin; Germany
- Coordinates: 52°25′27″N 13°22′29″E
- Lines: Berlin–Dresden suburban railway (KBS 200.2); Royal Prussian Military Railway (dismantled)
- Platforms: 2

Construction
- Accessible: no

Other information
- Station code: 203
- DS100 code: BMF
- IBNR: 8089074
- Category: 5
- Fare zone: VBB: Berlin B/5656
- Website: www.bahnhof.de

History
- Opened: 17 June 1875

Passengers
- 8,000

Services
| Preceding station | Berlin S-Bahn | Following station |
|---|---|---|
| Attilastraße towards Bernau | S2 | Buckower Chaussee towards Blankenfelde |
Location

Berlin-Marienfelde station is a station and a freight yard in Berlin, Germany. It is located on the Berlin–Dresden railway line in the locality of Marienfelde, part of the Tempelhof-Schöneberg borough. The station is part of the Berlin S-Bahn rapid transit network.

== History ==
The station, initially named Marienfelde, opened with the Dresden Railway on 17 June 1875. A few months later, on 15 October 1875, it also became a stop on the parallel Royal Prussian Military Railway (Königlich Preußischen Militär-Eisenbahn), which ran from the Berlin Military station in Schöneberg to Zossen. Marienfelde station was far away from the built-up area of Berlin at that time. It stimulated the development of the Neu-Marienfelde mansion colony west of the tracks.

From 1893 onwards, the station was rebuilt and extended with an island platform, which was opened in March 1903. The station has been served by third rail S-Bahn trains since May 1939.

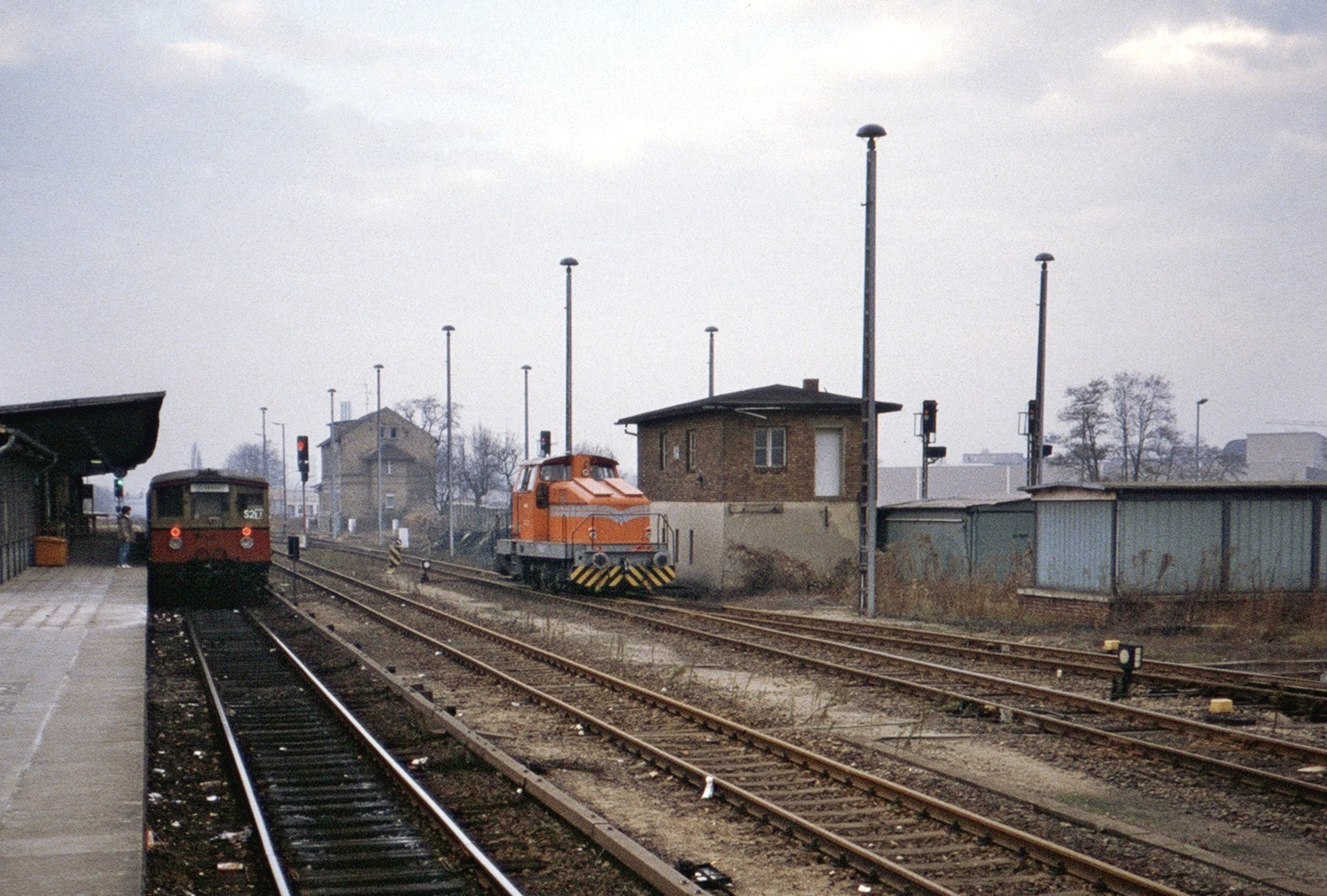
Platform with class 275 S-Bahn train of the BVG, to the right of the signal box is locomotive 8 (Henschel DHG 700 C class) of GASAG, 1986

The former counter hall was partially destroyed in World War II; today, only the entrance to the platform remains. After the war, the line’s second track towards Lichtenrade was dismantled to provide reparations to the Soviet Union. Not until 1990, it was rebuilt in 1990, so that services could be operated at ten-minute intervals to Lichtenrade. In the early 1950s the freight depot was enlarged. The name of the station was changed to Berlin-Marienfelde on 1 August 1952.

=== High-speed track ===
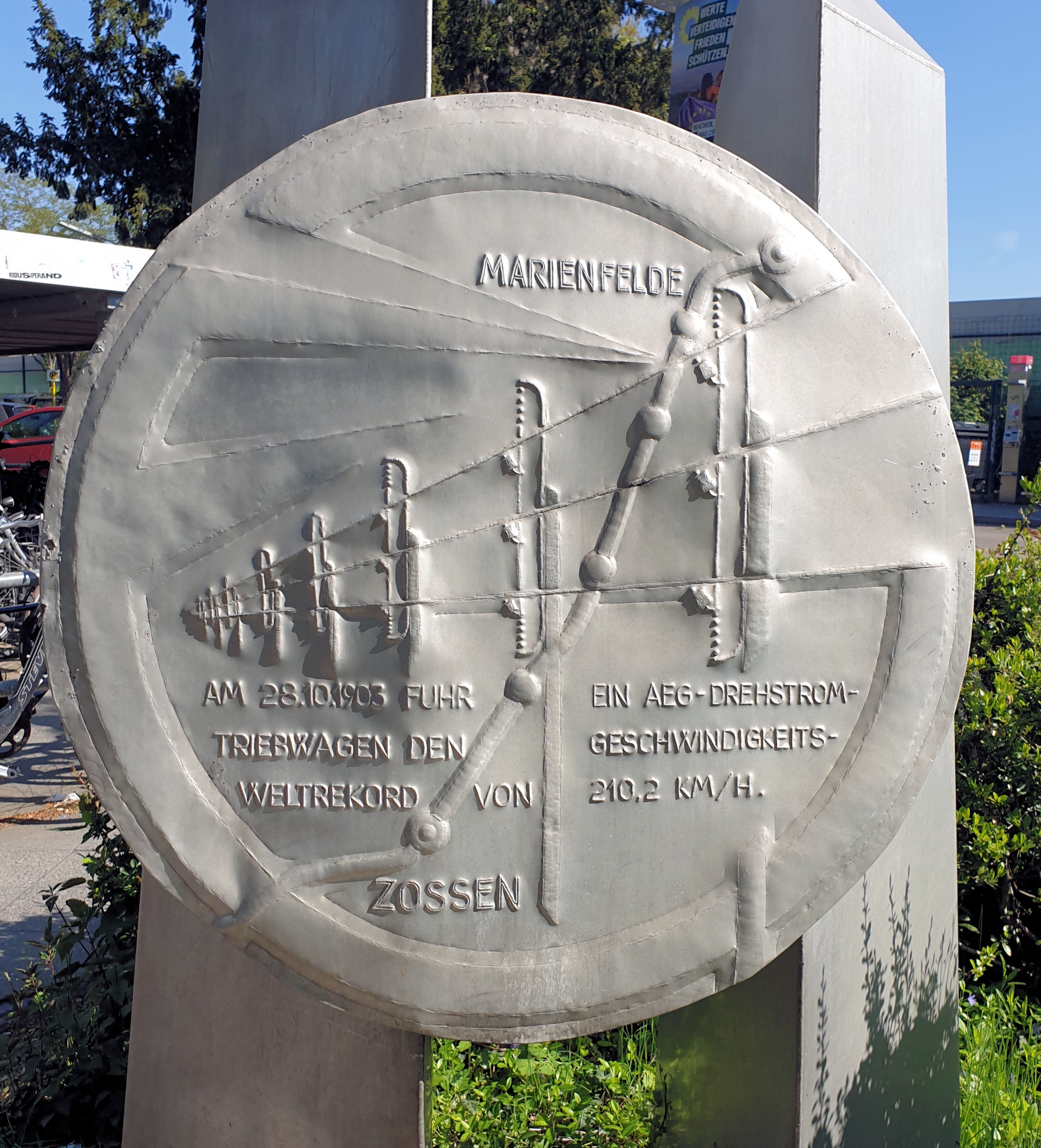
Monument commemorating the world speed record

Various high-speed tests with electrical locomotives and railcars were carried out between 1901 and 1904 on the Royal Prussian Military Railway between Marienfelde and Zossen. These vehicles operated with three-phase alternating current of 10 kilovolts and variable frequency. The power supply was carried by three overhead lines placed vertically.

On 27 October 1903, the trial AEG railcars ran at a new world record speed of 210.2 km/h. This event is commemorated by a plaque at the station.

== Proposed work ==
The reconstruction of Berlin-Marienfelde station is planned as part of the restoration of the long-distance tracks of the Dresden railway in the Berlin area. Barrier-free access to the platform is also to be provided as part of this work. This work was planned from 2016 to 2018 at an estimated cost of €3 million. Currently, Deutsche Bahn assumes construction works to start in 2021

== Freight yard ==
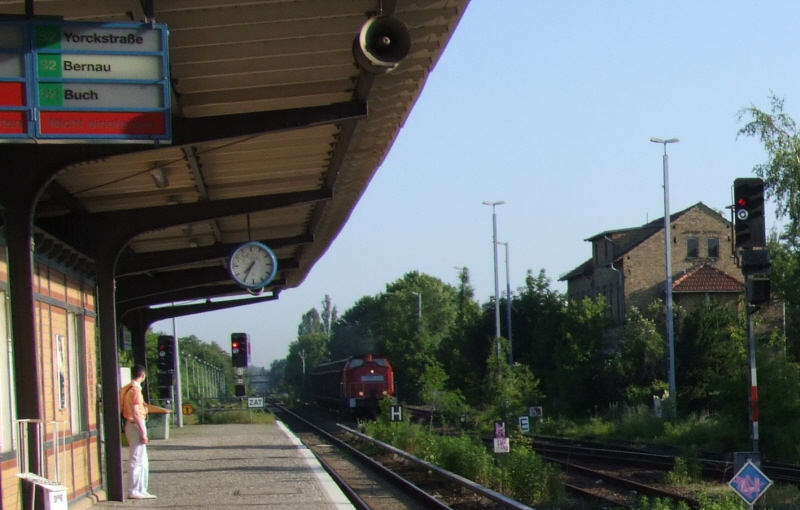
Entrance of a freight train from the north

The freight yard is located southeast of the S-Bahn platform. Freight trains run through the station and over the S-Bahn tracks to the southern Ringbahn and to the rail facilities at the oil port on the Teltow Canal at Lankwitz.

== Connections ==
The station is served by S-Bahn line S2 and was used by around 8,000 passengers daily in 2006. There are bus connections to many parts of Marienfelde.

== See also ==
- List of railway stations in Berlin
