= Buckower Chaussee station =

Railway station in Tempelhof-Schöneberg, Germany

Buckower Chaussee
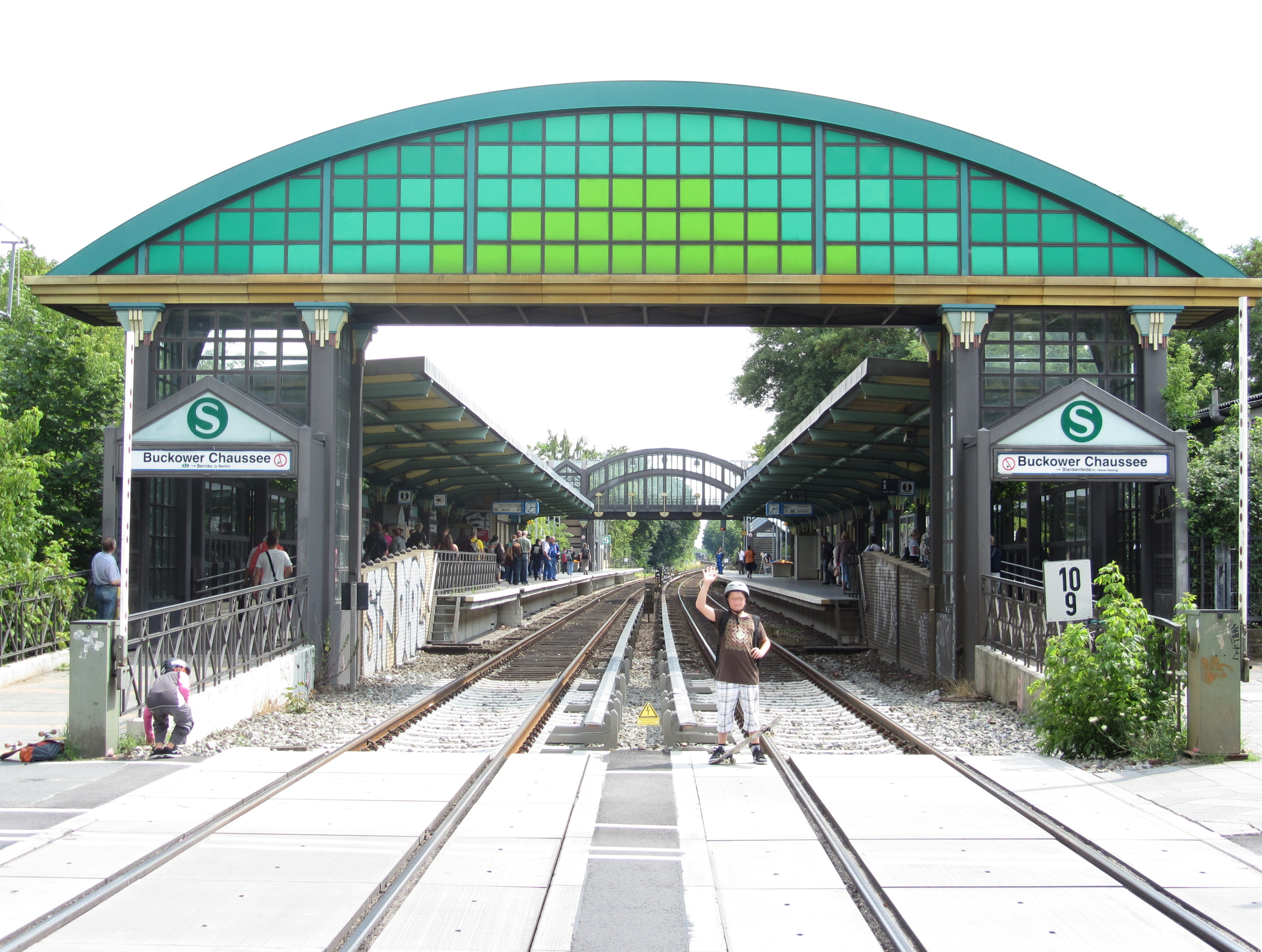
- The archway of the Buckower Chaussee station

General information
- Location: Marienfelde, Tempelhof-Schöneberg, Berlin; Germany
- Coordinates: 52°24′38″N 13°22′58″E
- Line: Berlin–Dresden suburban railway (KBS 200.2)
- Platforms: 2
- Tracks: 2

Construction
- Accessible: Yes
- Architect: Rainer G. Rümmler

Other information
- Station code: 951
- DS100 code: BBCH
- IBNR: 8089010
- Category: 5
- Fare zone: VBB: Berlin B/5656
- Website: www.bahnhof.de

History
- Opened: 15 May 1946; 80 years ago
- Rebuilt: 1988-1992
- Electrified: at opening, 750 V DC system (3rd rail)

Services
Preceding station	Berlin S-Bahn	Following station
Marienfelde towards Bernau	S2	Schichauweg towards Blankenfelde
Location

Buckower Chaussee station is a station on the Berlin–Dresden railway in the locality of Marienfelde in the Berlin borough of Tempelhof-Schöneberg. It is served by Berlin S-Bahn line S2.

== History ==
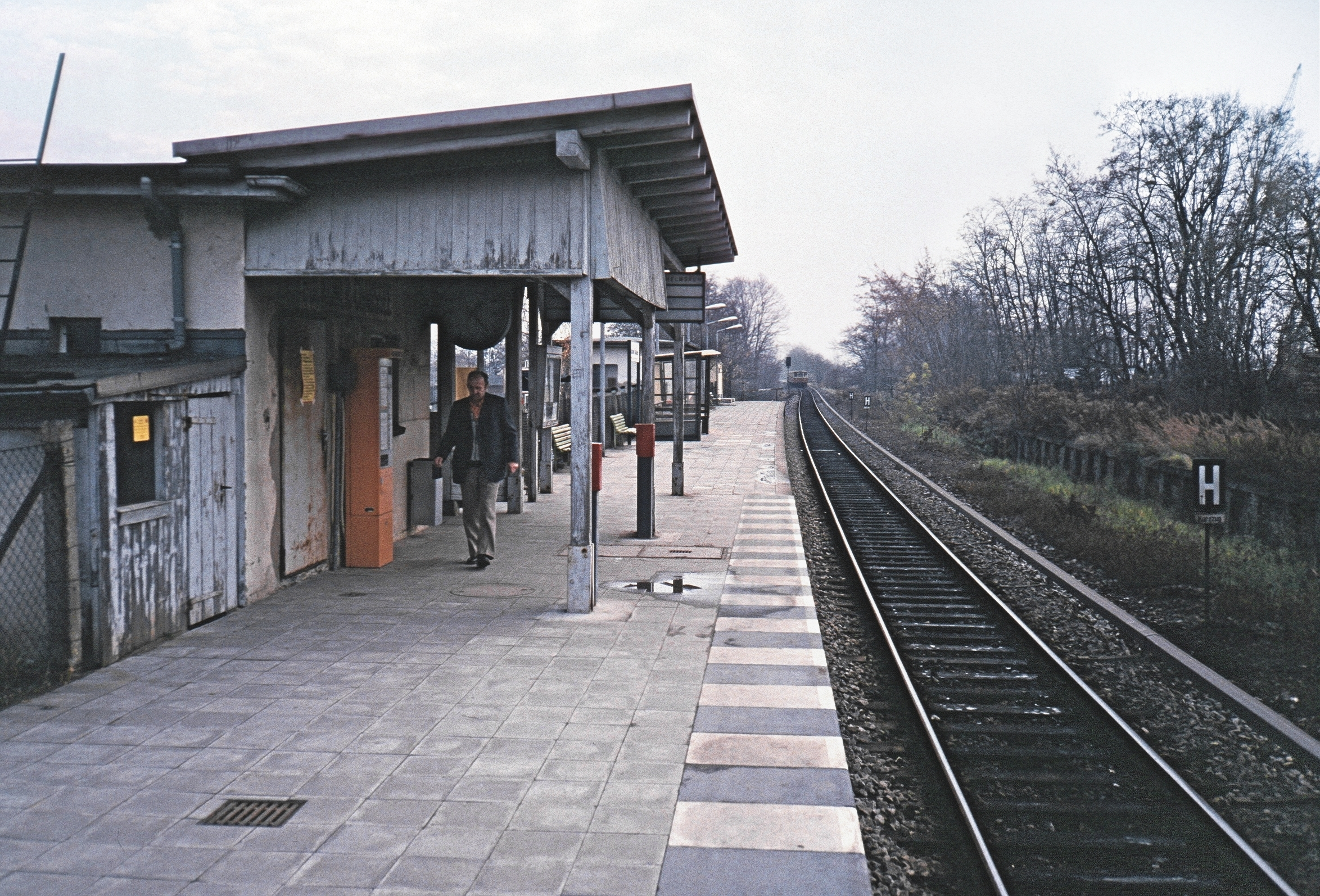
Temporary platform in 1986, looking to the south

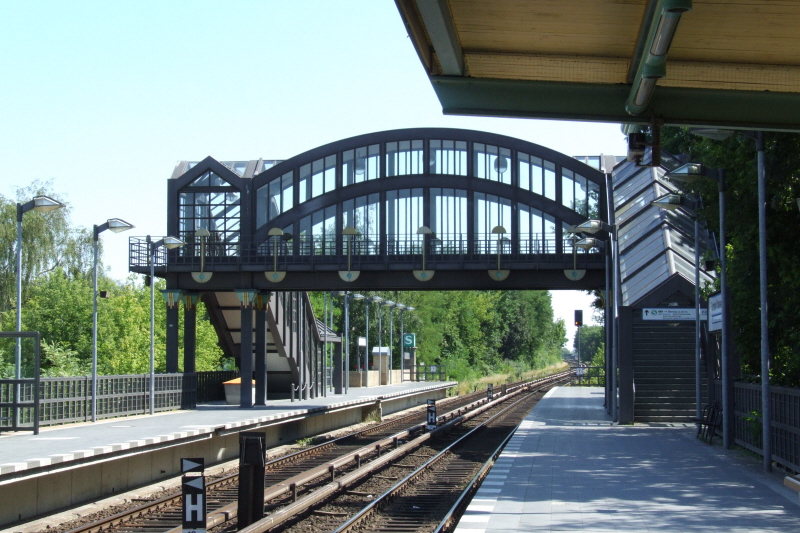
Crossing from the western platform to the parking area

Buckower Chaussee station was established on the Dresden railway in Berlin east of Dorfaue Marienfelde on 15 May 1946, as it was required by the American occupation forces. This station for many years was considered to be a temporary station on the then single-track S-Bahn line. It received its current appearance during the doubling of the line between Marienfelde and Lichtenrade in the late 1980s. The architect was Rainer G. Rümmler, who also designed virtually all new U-Bahn stations in West Berlin over several decades. The detailed design is similar to the stations in Berlin-Spandau and Wittenau. The two side platforms now extend to the street of Buckower Chaussee in the north. At that end a large archway spans the platforms and tracks and draws attention to the S-Bahn station. At the southern end, a bridge completes the station. It is possible to reach the station car park over this bridge without crossing the tracks.

Just before the station there are still two level crossings over Säntisstraße and the busy Buckower Chaussee. The station underwent extensive changes during the restoration of the Dresden railway after the reunification of Germany.

== Connections ==
The station is served by S-Bahn line S2. There are connections to bus routes operated by the municipal bus operators, Berliner Verkehrsbetriebe and Regionale Verkehrsgesellschaft Dahme-Spreewald.

== See also ==
- List of railway stations in Berlin
