= Marienfelde =

- Quarter of Berlin
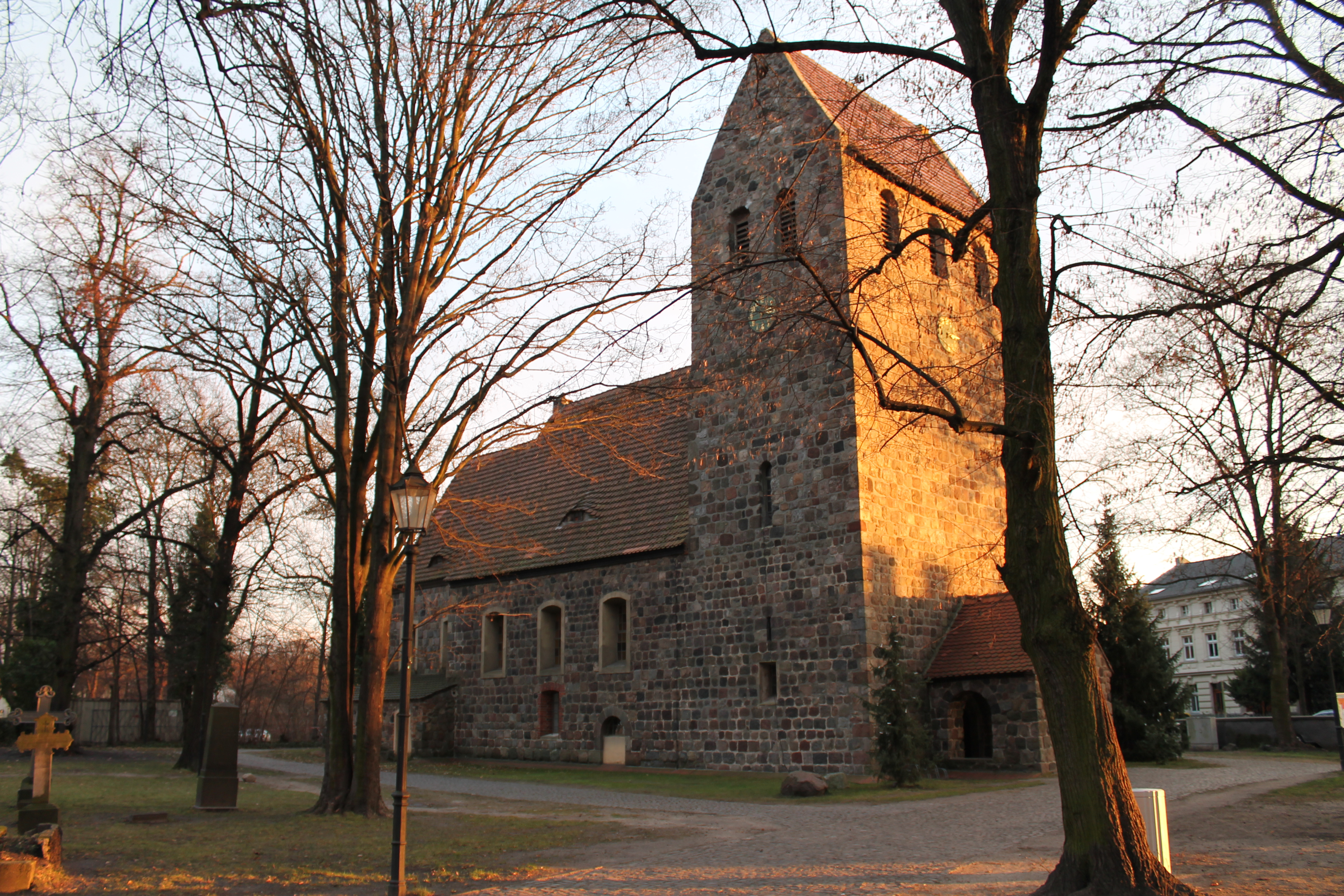
- Village Church

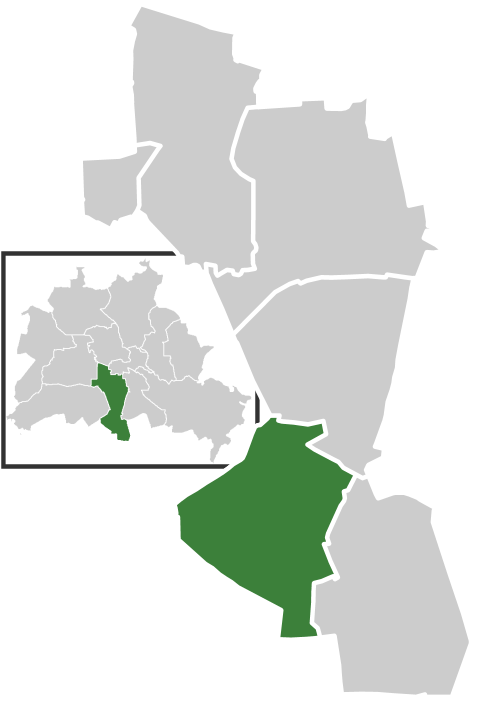
- Location of Marienfelde in Tempelhof-Schöneberg and Berlin
- Interactive map of Marienfelde
- Location within Germany Location within Berlin
- Coordinates: 52°25′00″N 13°22′00″E
- Country: Germany
- State: Berlin
- City: Berlin
- Borough: Tempelhof-Schöneberg
- Founded: 1220

Area
  - Total: 9.15 km^{2} (3.53 sq mi)
- Elevation: 40 m (130 ft)

Population (2024-12-31)
  - Total: 32,365
  - Density: 3,540/km^{2} (9,160/sq mi)
- Time zone: UTC+01:00 (CET)
  - Summer (DST): UTC+02:00 (CEST)
- Postal codes: 12277, 12279
- Vehicle registration: B

Marienfelde (German pronunciation: [maˈʁiːənˌfɛldə]) is a locality in southwest Berlin, Germany, part of the Tempelhof-Schöneberg borough. The former village, incorporated according to the Greater Berlin Act of 1920, today is a mixed industrial and residential area.

== Geography ==
The Marienfelde quarter borders the Tempelhof-Schöneberg localities of Mariendorf in the northeast and Lichtenrade in the southeast. In the west, it borders on Lankwitz, part of the Steglitz-Zehlendorf borough. In the south, it is bounded by the Berlin city limits and the border with the state of Brandenburg.

== History ==
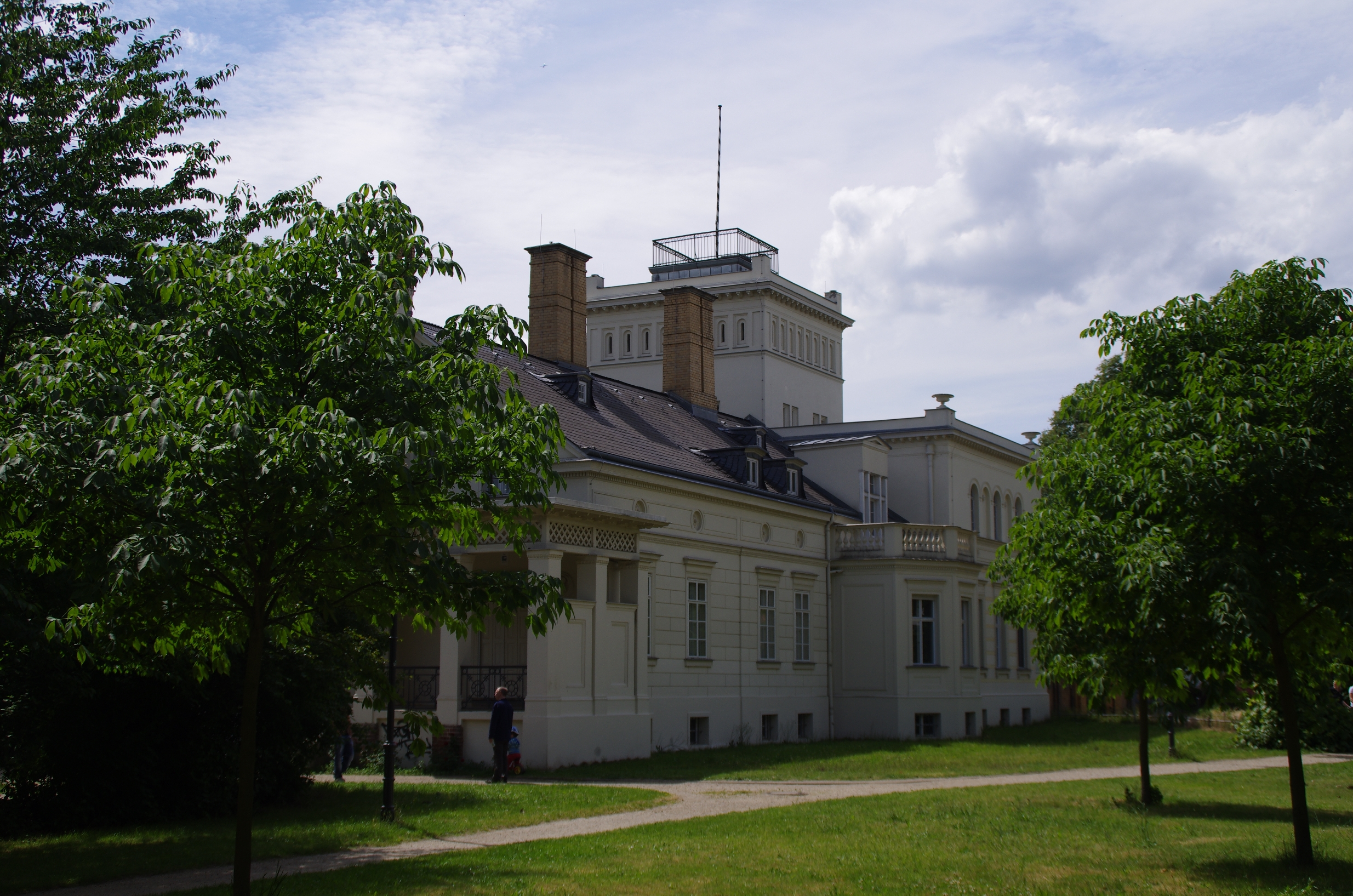
Marienfelde manor

The medieval Angerdorf arose together with neighbouring Mariendorf during the German Ostkolonisation migration about 1220 AD, then affiliated with the Teltow estates held by the Knights Templar commandry at Tempelhof. A fieldstone church was erected around 1240 which, still preserved, is one of the oldest in the Berlin area.

The settlement of Merghenvelde itself was first mentioned in a 1344 deed, after the Brandenburg lands of the Knights Templar had passed to the Order of Saint John. From 1435 onwards, the estates were held by the City of Berlin. Located in the southwestern suburbs of the Prussian capital, population increased from the mid-19th century on. In 1913 the Marienfelde Studios were constructed, and were later taken over by Terra Film.

During World War II, Marienfelde was the location of a subcamp of the Sachsenhausen concentration camp for some 500–600 prisoners of various nationalities, including Polish, Czechoslovak, Soviet, Norwegian, Dutch, French, Spanish and Luxembourgish, plus some German political prisoners. The historic village centre was largely destroyed during the bombing of Berlin in World War II.

== Transportation and industry ==
Transportation and industry have played an important role in the development of Marienfelde: Since 1875 the Dresden Railway, a main North-South line entering Berlin, passes through Marienfelde. It is currently served by the Berlin S-Bahn commuter rail network at the Marienfelde, Buckower Chaussee and Schichauweg railway stations. The re-development as a long-distance track is planned.

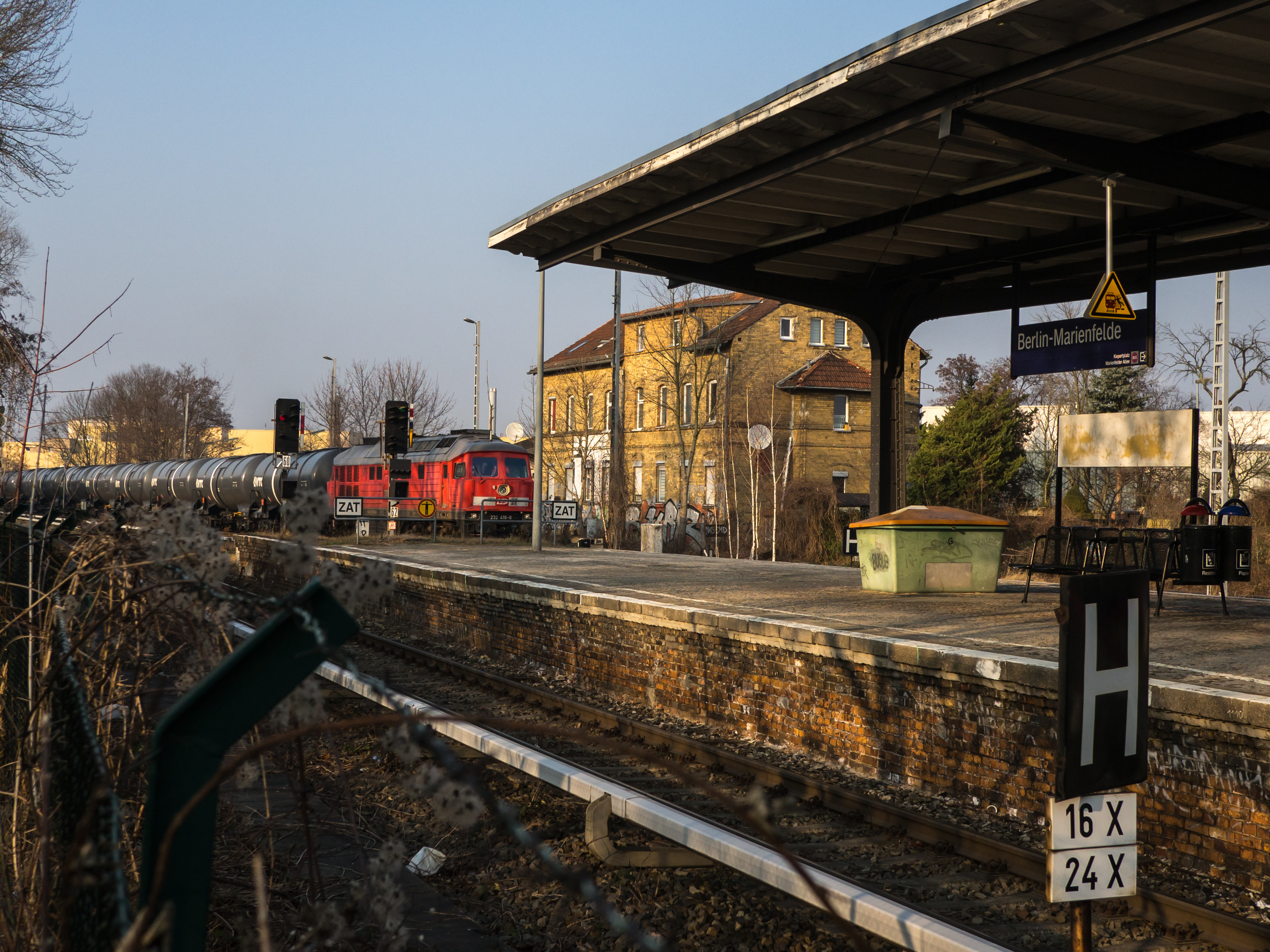
Tanker train at Marienfelde station

The parallel Royal Prussian Military Railway passed through the Marienfelde area on its way from Berlin to the town of Zossen. Between 1901 and 1904, the track was electrified and used as test track for high-speed locomotive testing. Ten kilovolt, three-phase alternating current with a frequency of 50 hertz was transmitted over three overhead wires, strung one above the other. Experimental electrical locomotives reached speeds of up to 210.8 km/h (131 mph) on the track.

Near the end of World War II, as part of the Elbe-Project, the world's first high-voltage direct current transmission lines were built from a power plant in Dessau, on the Elbe river, to Marienfelde. A substation was located in Marienfelde converted the direct current into alternating current. However, developments in the war prevented the project from ever becoming operational.

Today, Marienfelde comprises several industrial parks such as the former Daimler Motoren Gesellschaft assembly plant opened in 1902, today operated by Daimler AG. Other main employers include IBM and Stollwerck; as well as branches of the Federal Ministry of Food and Agriculture, the Federal Office of Consumer Protection and Food Safety, and the Friedrich Loeffler Institute.

== Refugee processing center ==
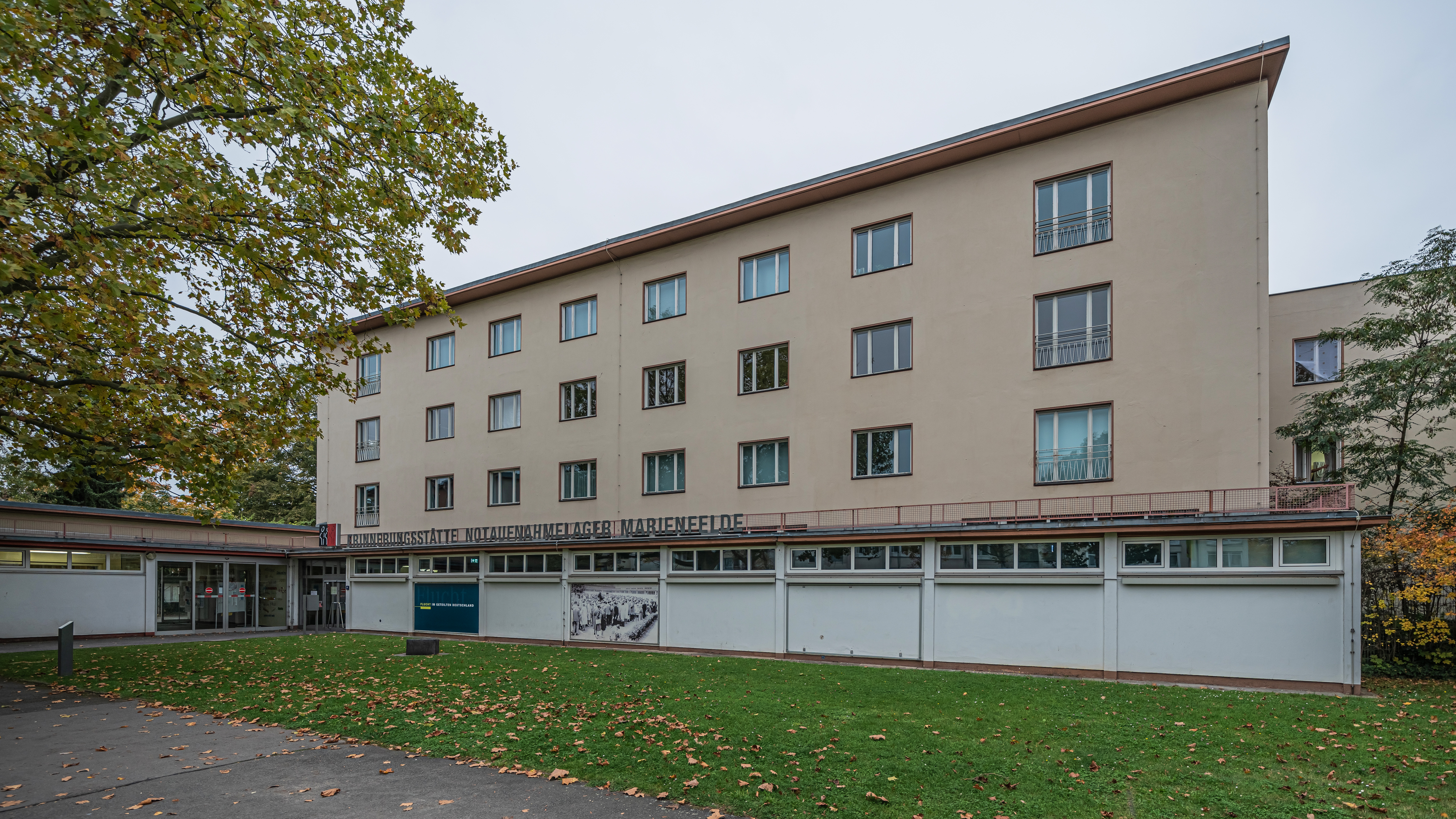
Refugee center memorial site

Marienfelde is also known for a large refugee-processing center which operated during the Cold War. The center, which opened in 1953, was the first stop for more than 1.5 million refugees fleeing communism in East Germany via West Berlin. Refugees arriving in West Berlin were sent to the center where they received medical treatment, food, identification papers, and housing until they could be permanently re-settled in the West.

Even after the fall of the Berlin Wall in 1989, the center continued processing East German refugees until unification a year later. Today the center remains in use, processing ethnic Germans who are immigrating to Germany from the former Soviet Union.
