= Willy Hoffmann =

German architect

Hermann Willy Hoffmann (15 June 1878 – 1977) was a German architect.

== Life ==
Hoffmann studied architecture at the Technische Hochschule in Charlottenburg (now Technische Universität Berlin) from 1897. In 1904 he received the Schinkel Prize for Architecture and was accepted into the Architects and Engineers Association in Berlin. In 1907 he got a job in the construction department of the Imperial Post Office. In 1911 Hoffmann went to Hanover as a post-construction engineer, in 1912 to Breslau and in 1914 to Berlin. He presumably volunteered as a war volunteer when World War I broke out. In 1920 Hoffmann was appointed post office building officer, in 1924 he was appointed post office building officer. In 1934 Willy Hoffmann was retired.

Many of the buildings he designed are now listed buildings.

== Buildings ==
- 1924–1926: Post office W 30 (later post office 30 or 1030) in Berlin-Schöneberg, Geisbergstrasse 7/9
- 1925–1926: Post office Niederschöneweide (later post office 119) in Berlin-Niederschöneweide, Fennstrasse 9/11
- 1925–1928: Oberpostdirektion (Berlin) (later State Post Office Berlin) in Berlin-Charlottenburg, Dernburgstrasse (building ceramics by John Martens)
- 1930: Reconstruction of the counter hall in post office Wilmersdorf 1 (later post office 31) in Berlin-Wilmersdorf, Uhlandstrasse 85
- 1930–1931: Lichtenrade post office (later post office 49) in Berlin-Lichtenrade, Bahnhofstrasse 5/6
- 1933: Exchange office "Hochmeister" and "Bleibtreu" with post office Halensee 2 (later post office 311) in Berlin-Wilmersdorf, Hochmeisterplatz (demolished 2017)

== Literature ==
- Association of Architects and Engineers in Berlin (ed.): Post and telecommunications. (= Berlin and its buildings, part X, volume B, volume 4.) Ernst & Sohn, Berlin 1987.
- Falk Jaeger: Posthorn & Imperial Eagle. The historic post offices in Berlin. Nicolaische Verlagbuchhandlung, Berlin 1987, ISBN 3-87584-197-2.

== Sources ==
- Hoffmann buildings in the official Berlin monument database with further information
- Museum of Communication Berlin
- Berlin address book
- Archive of the AIV Berlin
- Landesarchiv Berlin, inventory of the Upper Post Office

== Individual records ==
1. ↑ Birth register StA Halle, No. 1166/1878
2. ↑ Death register StA Bad Soden am Taunus, No. 406/1977
