= Lichtenrade station =

Railway station in Tempelhof-Schöneberg, Germany

Lichtenrade
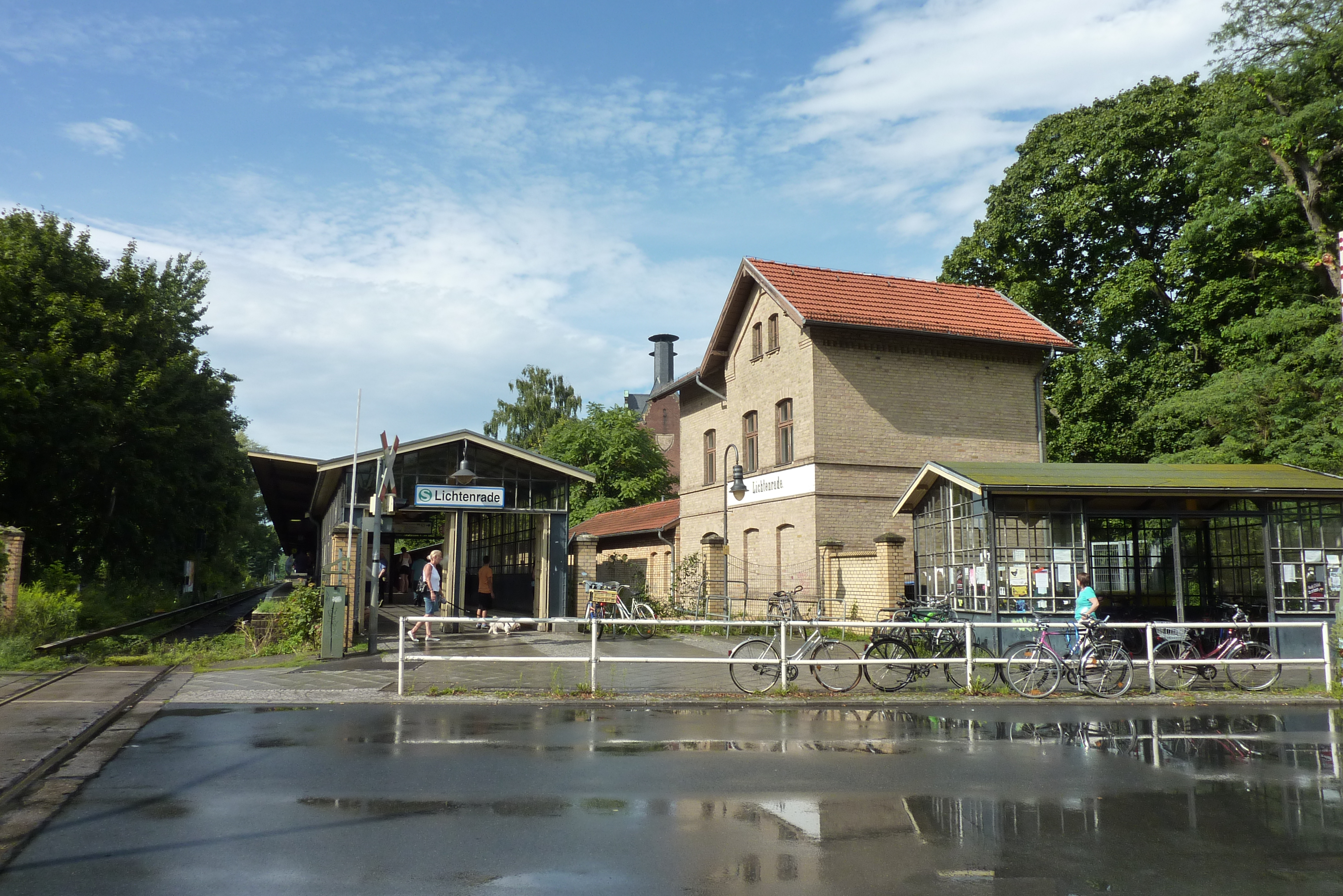
- Lichtenrade station

General information
- Location: Bahnhofstr.31, Lichtenrade, Tempelhof-Schöneberg, Berlin; Germany
- Coordinates: 52°23′14″N 13°23′47″E
- Line: Berlin–Dresden suburban railway (KBS 200.2)
- Platforms: 1 island platform
- Tracks: 2

Construction
- Accessible: Yes

Other information
- Station code: 3703
- DS100 code: BLRD
- IBNR: 8089070
- Category: 5
- Fare zone: VBB: Berlin B/5656
- Website: www.bahnhof.de

History
- Opened: 1 June 1883; 143 years ago
- Electrified: 15 May 1939; 87 years ago, 750 V DC system (3rd rail)

Services
Preceding station	Berlin S-Bahn	Following station
Schichauweg towards Bernau	S2	Mahlow towards Blankenfelde
Location

Berlin-Lichtenrade station is a station on the Berlin–Dresden railway in the locality of Lichtenrade in the Berlin borough of Tempelhof-Schöneberg. It is served by Berlin S-Bahn line S2.

== History ==
The railway line from Berlin to Dresden was opened on 17 June 1875. Eight years later, a station was built the still single-track line at the village of Lichtenrade, which was opened on 1 June 1883. The 30 metre-long gravel platform was located south of today's Bahnhofstrasse (“station street”). The Royal Prussian Military Railway ran on its western edge from 1875, but it was dismantled after the First World War in 1919.

In 1892, a second track was built and the two-storey, yellow brick station building was built north of Bahnhofstrasse. The station offices were on the ground floor of the unadorned functional building and upstairs there was the stationmaster's apartment. A house for rail officials was built to its north in the same style and between the two there was single-storey building with commercial space and toilets.

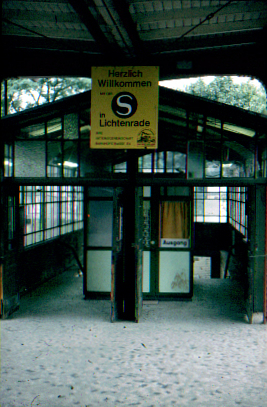
Entrance building with ticket office in 1984

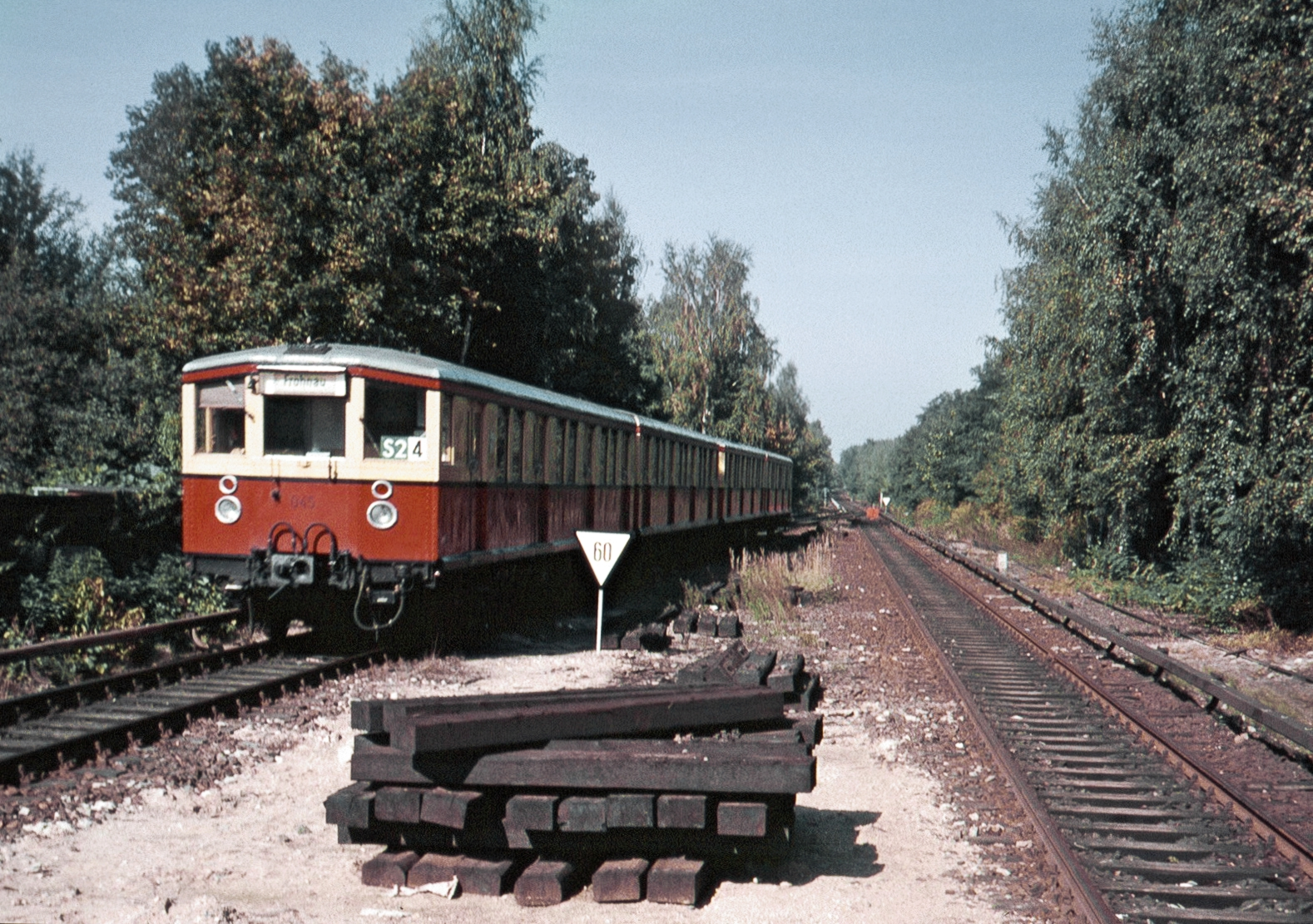
S-Bahn train of class 275 of the BVG at the entrance to the station on the still single-track line in 1986

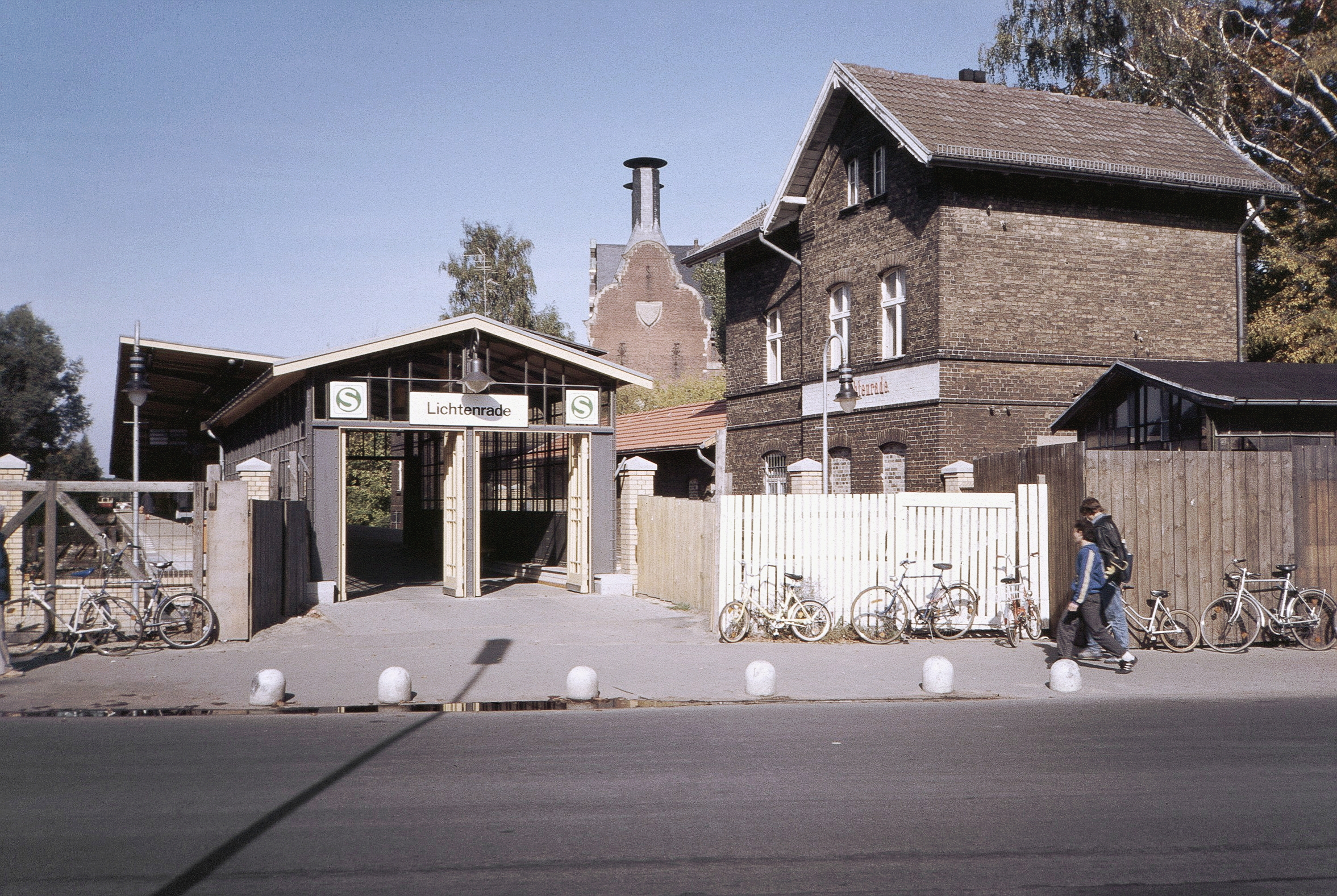
Lichtenrade station as a terminus, the station building in front and the malting behind, 1986

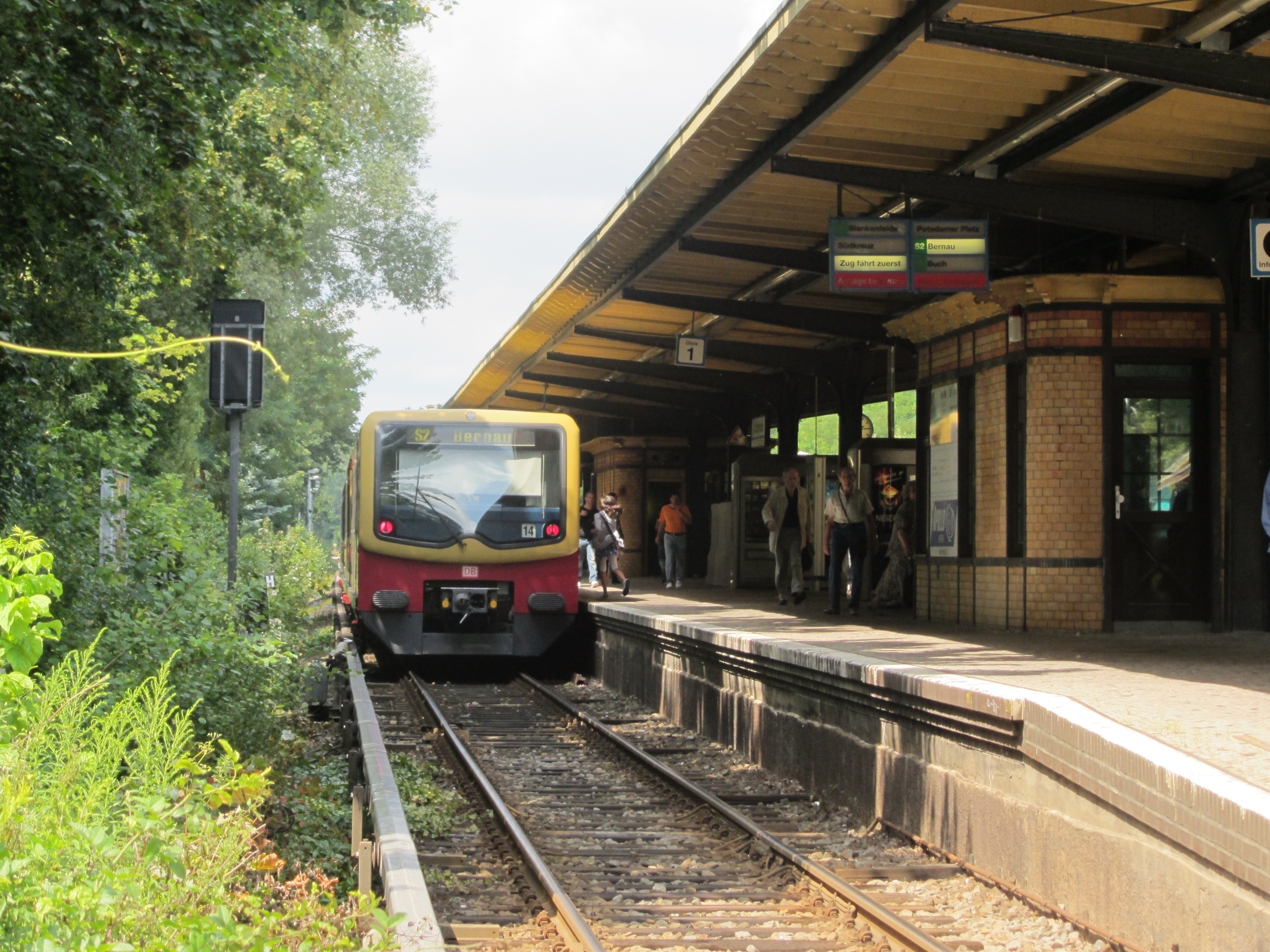
Train of class 481 on the western track

The side platforms were replaced by a central platform at its current location in 1909/10. A loading track and a siding to a malt house were built on the east side.

A pedestrian tunnel was built near the south end of the platform so that passengers could reach the trains even from a section of the contiguous streets of Bahnhofstrasse and Prinzessinnenstraße that was enclosed with barrier rails; this branched to the two streets. The stairs from the streets were enclosed in protective shelters built in "greenhouse architecture", signs with the station's name of Lichtenrade were attached to the doors. Tickets were sold and ticket inspection took place at a centrally located office in the third protective shelter at the entrance to the underpass to the platform.

The platform roofing was supported by sixteen central pillars. A service room, a waiting room and a toilet block were built on the platform. A kiosk was added in 1925 and a "splinter bunker" (Splitterbunker, that is a small air raid shelter giving some protection against fragments) was added during the Second World War. The platform height was increased by 20 cm in 1939 as part of the electrification of the line with a side-mounted third rail. Electric S-Bahn services began on 15 May 1939.

As a result of war damage at the end of the Second World War, S-Bahn services ended in April 1945. Suburban services were re-established on a single track on 19 August 1945, at first steam-hauled, but from 8 September operations with electric railcars were re-established. From 1948 there was a temporary service with DMUs towards Grünau from the same platform.

After the building of the Berlin Wall on 13 August 1961, no trains ran to the south from Lichtenrade and the station became a terminus. The level crossing barriers were dismantled, but the access tunnel retained its function. The two tracks ended at buffer stops in front of Bahnhofstrasse. The Lrd signalbox at the northern end of the station was shut down in 1977–78 and only one platform track was used from then on.

From the takeover of the S-Bahn from Deutsche Reichsbahn by the Berliner Verkehrsbetriebe (BVG, Berlin Transportation Company) on 9 January 1984, Lichtenrade was initially the end of the remaining line from the Anhalter Bahnhof. That year, the access tunnel was shut down and the platform has since been reached from ground level. The closed tunnel and the three glass protective shelters of the original station building have been preserved, but not for access. Two of them continue to be used as a bike shelter and a bus shelter; the other one can only be reached by the passage from the platform.

When the track to Lichtenrade was duplicated, a turn-back was built in a trapezoidal shape along with a siding on the eastern side. The control table of a new signal box was placed in the administrative building.

After the reunification of Germany, the westerly track through Lichtenrade was rebuilt and the level crossing was reactivated. Operations on the line were restored on 28 August 1992, initially to Mahlow.

The ensemble of the station with some surrounding buildings ("Station buildings and officials’ house, Lichtenrade villa with garden, the Schloßbrauerei Schöneberg malthouse ") is listed on the heritage list of Berlin. The station, listed as "station buildings and officials’ house, 1892; island platform, 1900/10 ", is also identified with furniture, platform shelter, access cottage as a single heritage listing.

== Connections ==
The station is served by S-Bahn line S2.

== See also ==
- List of railway stations in Berlin
