= Marienfelde refugee transit camp =

Coordinates: 52.4203°N 13.3667°E

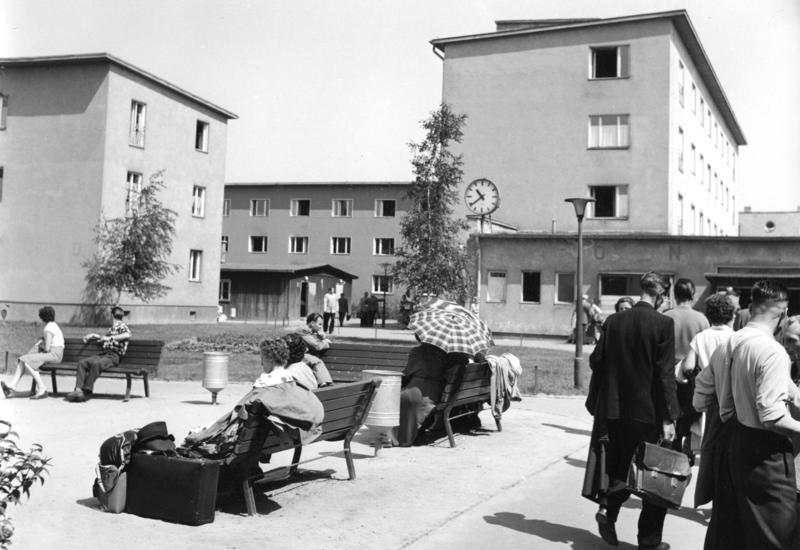
Marienfelde refugee camp, July 1958

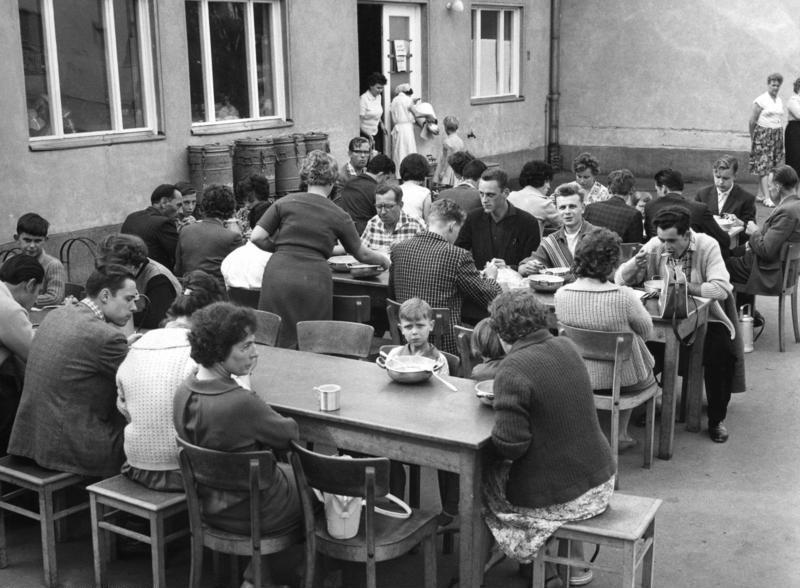
Marienfelde refugee camp, July 1961

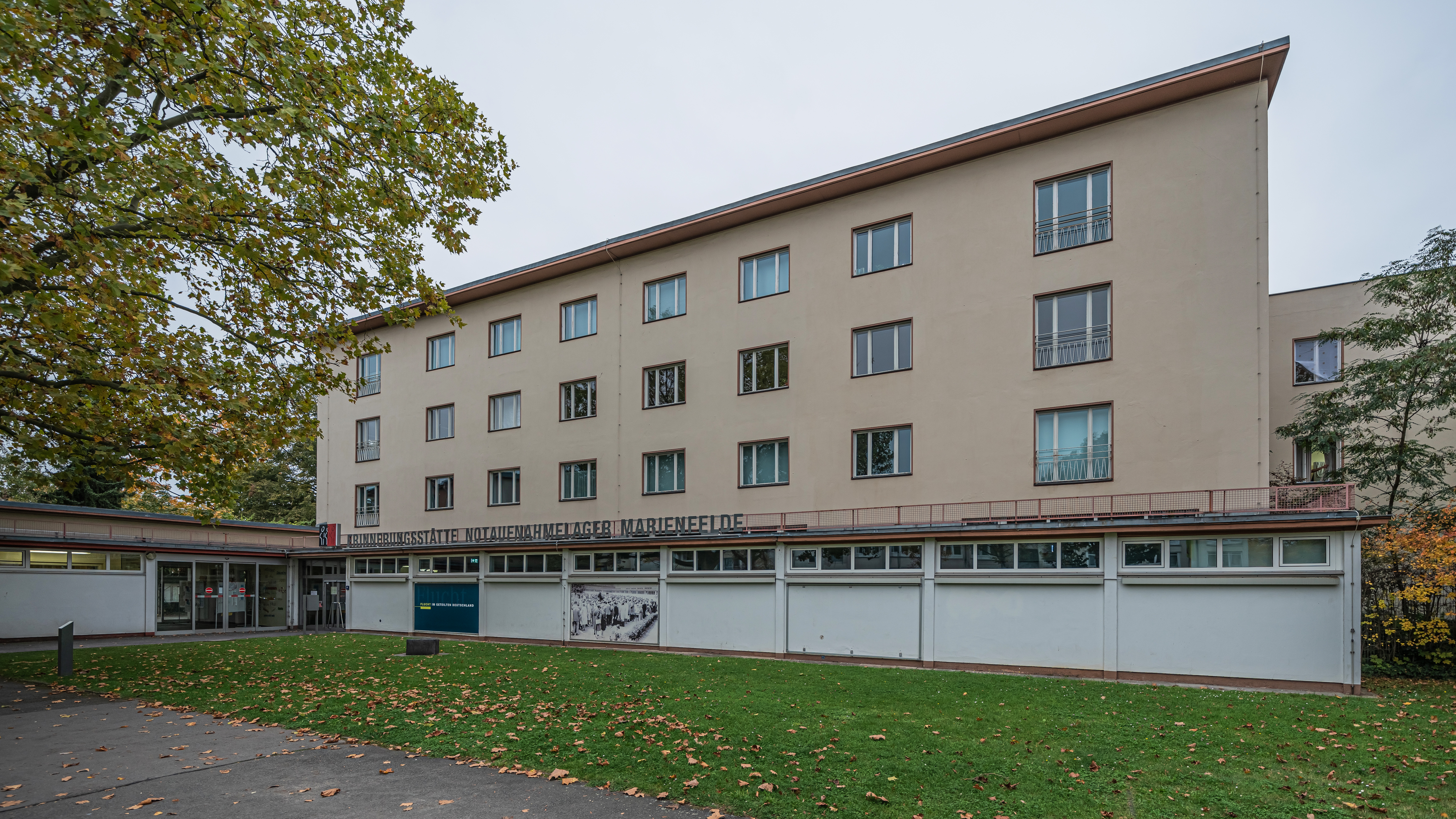
Contemporary view of the memorial's entrance

Marienfelde refugee transit camp (German: Notaufnahmelager Marienfelde) was one of three camps operated by West Germany and West Berlin during the Cold War for dealing with the great waves of immigration from East Germany, especially between 1950 and 1961. Refugees arriving in West Berlin were sent to the reception centre located in the Marienfelde district, where they received medical treatment, food, identification papers, and housing until they could be permanently re-settled in the West.

== History ==
From 1948, a rising number of residents of the Soviet occupation zone fled to the Western occupation zones (Trizone) and West Berlin in particular, to settle down and become citizens there. In 1949, 129,245 people emigrated, and the number increased every year.

After the establishment of the two German states, the West German Federal Emergency Law (Bundesnotaufnahmegesetz) was promulgated on 22 August 1950. A small refugee camp was established in the Charlottenburg district of West Berlin, to help those who immigrated, but a new, larger camp became necessary due to the increasing numbers of immigrants - about 200,000 in 1950, approximately 165,000 in 1951, and 182,000 in 1952. After the closure of the Inner German border by decision of the East German government on 26 May 1952, tens of thousands of refugees used the remaining possibility to cross over the border from East Berlin into West Berlin.

The Federal Emergency Law was officially adopted by the West Berlin authorities on 4 February 1952. On July 30, a cornerstone for the new refugee camp was laid in Marienfelde, in the American occupation sector. Considerations that guided the Federal Emergency department (Notaufnahmelagers des Bundes) to build it in this location were its proximity to Tempelhof Airport and to the railway lines of the Berlin S-Bahn, as well as its relatively safe distance from the Soviet sector. Newly built barracks opened in the camp on 14 April 1953.

The camp operations started in August 1953, with ten housing blocks and a capacity of about 2,000 people, but it soon became over-crowded with waves of immigration after the East German Uprising on June 17. The camp was expanded later on, but was always densely populated until 1961.

Interrogation by Western Allied service agents for information about East Germany was frequent upon the refugees' arrivals at the camp. The camp featured barbed wire fences and identification cards to control who entered and left the camp and to keep out state security spies from the East.

Refugees in Marienfelde during the 1950s received benefits such as reduced-rate airfairs from West Berlin to West Germany via Berlin Tempelhof Airport. Non-Germans were often sent to American camps for foreigners in West Germany instead of registering at Marienfelde.

Immediately prior to the construction of the Berlin Wall, the numbers of immigrants entering the camp rose sharply: from 19,198 in June 1961, to 30,444 in July (about 1,000 a day), and then more than 1,200 a day in the first days of August. On August 12 it reached 2,400. On 13 August 1961, East German authorities closed the buffer zone between the two parts of Berlin and started building the Berlin Wall. Refugees continued to enter the camp for a few days after, mostly East Germans who had decided to stay in West Berlin after visiting the East.

Vice President Lyndon B. Johnson and mayor Willy Brandt visited the site on 20 August 1961 and were welcomed by a crowd of refugees.

The number of immigrants again rose during the Revolutions of 1989. The centre continued processing East German refugees even after the fall of the Berlin Wall on 9 November 1989 and until the German reunification a year later. Up to today, it remains in use, processing ethnic Germans who are immigrating to Germany from the former Soviet Union as well as asylum applicants. A memorial was inaugurated at the site in 1993; it is currently operated by the Berlin Wall Memorial foundation.

== 60th anniversary in 2013 ==
The site commemorated its 60th anniversary in 2013. German President Joachim Gauck participated in the ceremony alongside former refugees and other local politicians. In 2021, Hans Ticha's artwork "The Wall" was put on display at the memorial.

== See also ==
- Giessen
- Uelzen
- Hanawon
