= Places of Remembrance =

Places of Remembrance (Orte des Erinnerns)
- Germany
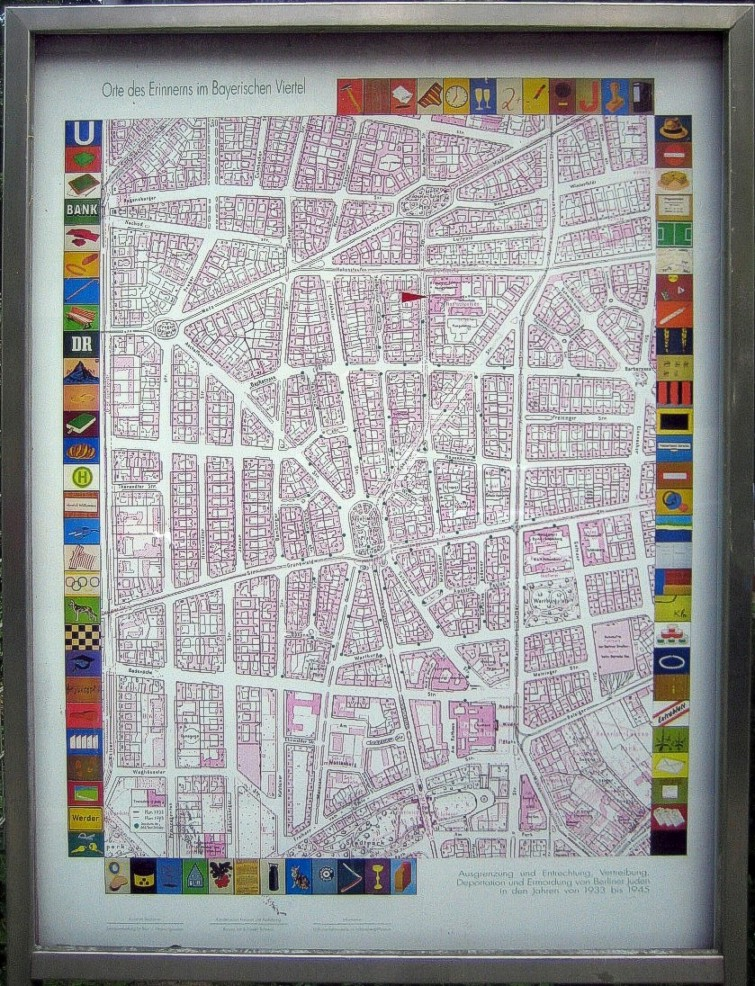
- Map displaying the location of 80 signs composing Places of Remembrance in the Bavarian Quarter
- For murdered and deported Jewish citizens of the Bayerischer Platz (Bavarian Quarter)
- Unveiled: 1993
- Location: 52°29′20″N 13°20′24″E near Bayeritscher Platz, Berlin-Schöneberg, Germany
- Designed by: Renata Stih & Frieder Schnock

Places of Remembrance is a memorial consisting of 80 different signs affixed to lampposts in the Bavarian Quarter of Berlin's Schöneberg locality. The 50 x 70 cm signs made of aluminum dispersed around the locality, 3 meters high, were designed by artist duo Stih & Schnock. The signs each have a simple image with an anti-Semitic law from 1933-1945 related to the image's depiction inscribed on its backside. The memorial is decentralized, rather than one location, with signs dispersed throughout the neighborhood, since their installation in 1993.

== History ==
Constructed from 1898 to 1908 by the Haberland brothers, the Bavarian Quarter was intended to house an open community of Berlin's rising upper-middle-class Jewish population. Before 1933, 16,000 Jewish citizens called the Schöneberg district home, until thousands were deported under the Nazi reign. Of these 16,000 residents, only the names of 6,000 deported and murdered Jews are known.

In the 1980s, Schöneberg's cultural office began a project called "Mahnen und Gedenkin im Bayerischen Viertel", which translates to "Reminders and Remembrance in the Bavarian Quarter". The project was dedicated to the documentation of Jewish life in the district, and in 1888, talks of a memorial began. In the winter of 1991, shortly after the fall of the Berlin Wall in 1989, the Berlin Senate and the Schöneberg Art Office hosted a competition for a centralized memorial commemorating the deported Jews of the Berlin-Schöneberg locality during the Holocaust. The chosen memorial was selected in 1992, and demonstrates the "gradual discrimination and disenfranchisement" of Jewish people between 1933 and 1945. The Places of Remembrance memorial was designed by artist duo Renata Stih & Frieder Schnock and was installed without announcement in 1993.

=== Design ===
The artists, ignoring the proposal's request for a centralized memorial, created 80 placards, each measuring 50 x 70 cm. These signs were attached to streetlights 3 m high, showing a simple colored image of an everyday object on one side and a text on the back which summarizes an anti-Jewish law, with a date in the bottom right corner indicating when it was enforced under the Nazi regime.

In designing the sign's images, the artists chose to follow the "aesthetics of normality", and selected "Bilder-Duden or Letra-Set image stencils". As a result, the signs seamlessly blend into the contemporary urban landscape, and even allude to "childlike" illustration.

For the quotes, the artist duo chose to summarize these laws as a reflection of the gradual disenfranchisement of the Jewish people under the Third Reich. The laws, implemented to systematically revoke Jewish civilians of their basic human rights, were passed over 12 years to allow for deportation and murder of Jewish individuals.

3 of the 80 designed signs affixed to lampposts throughout the Berlin-Schöneberg Provence
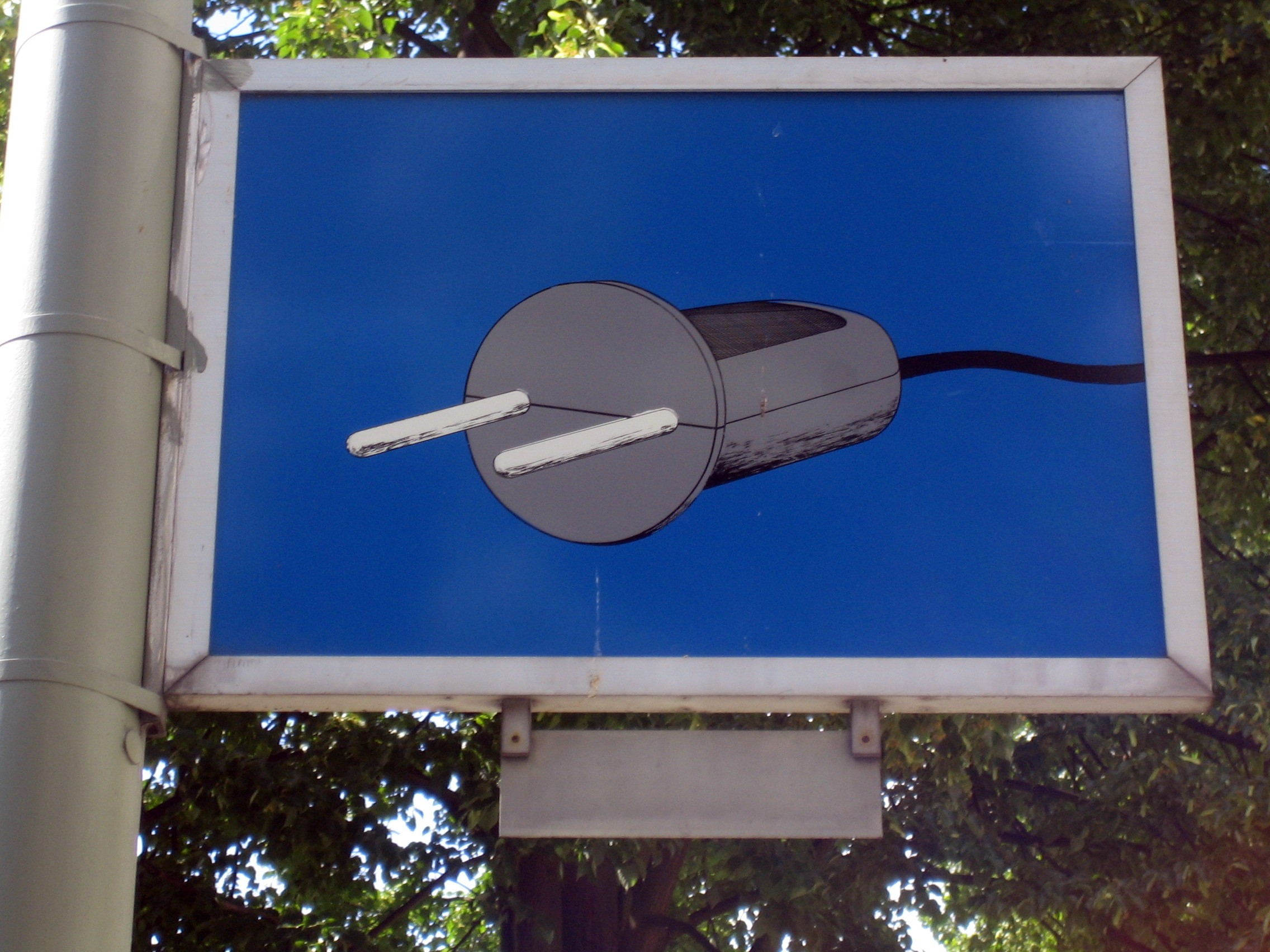
Blue sign depicting an electrical plug

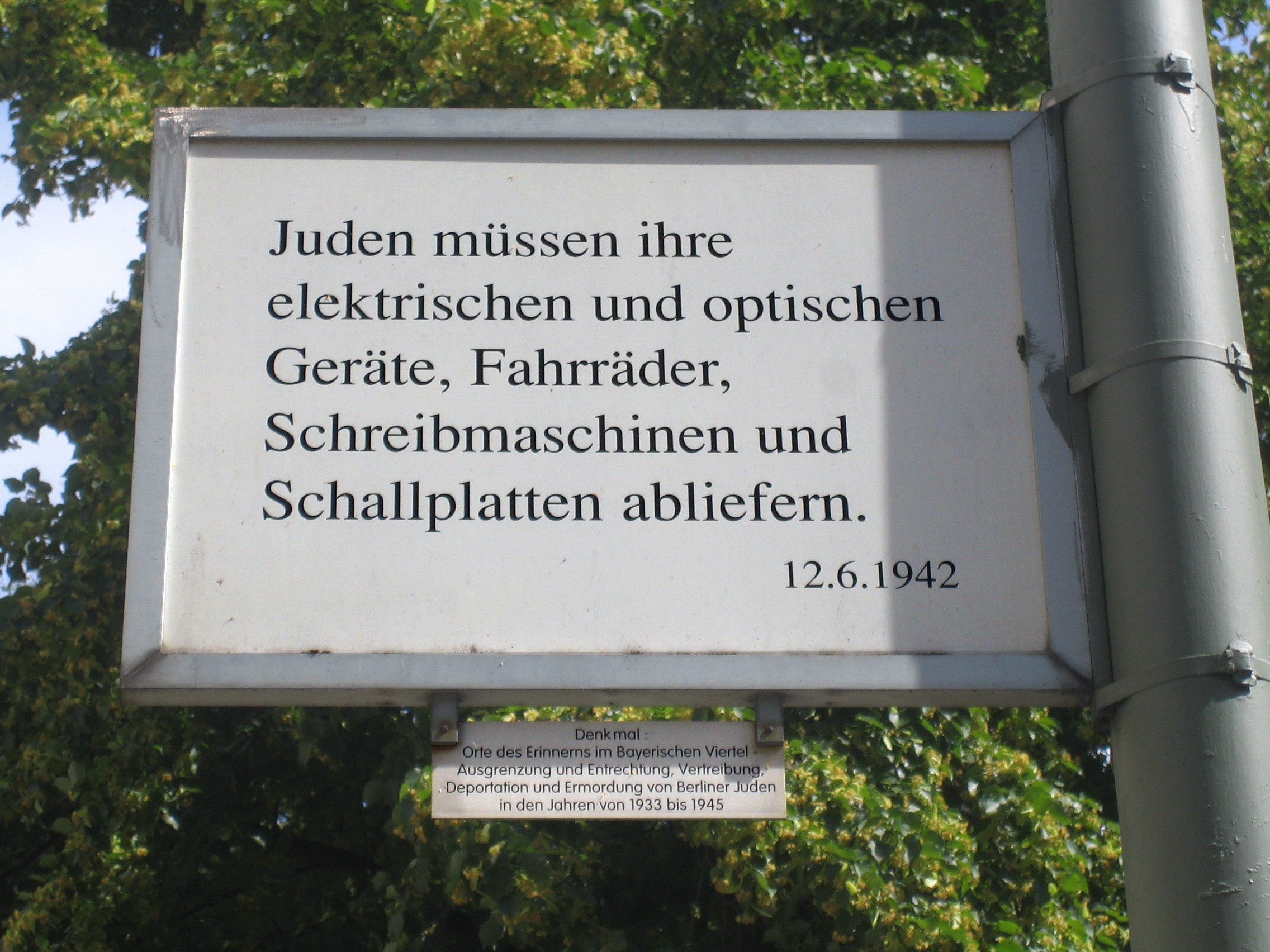
Sign which reads: "Jews have to hand over their electrical and optical devices, bicycles, typewriters and records." The law was set in place June 12, 1942.

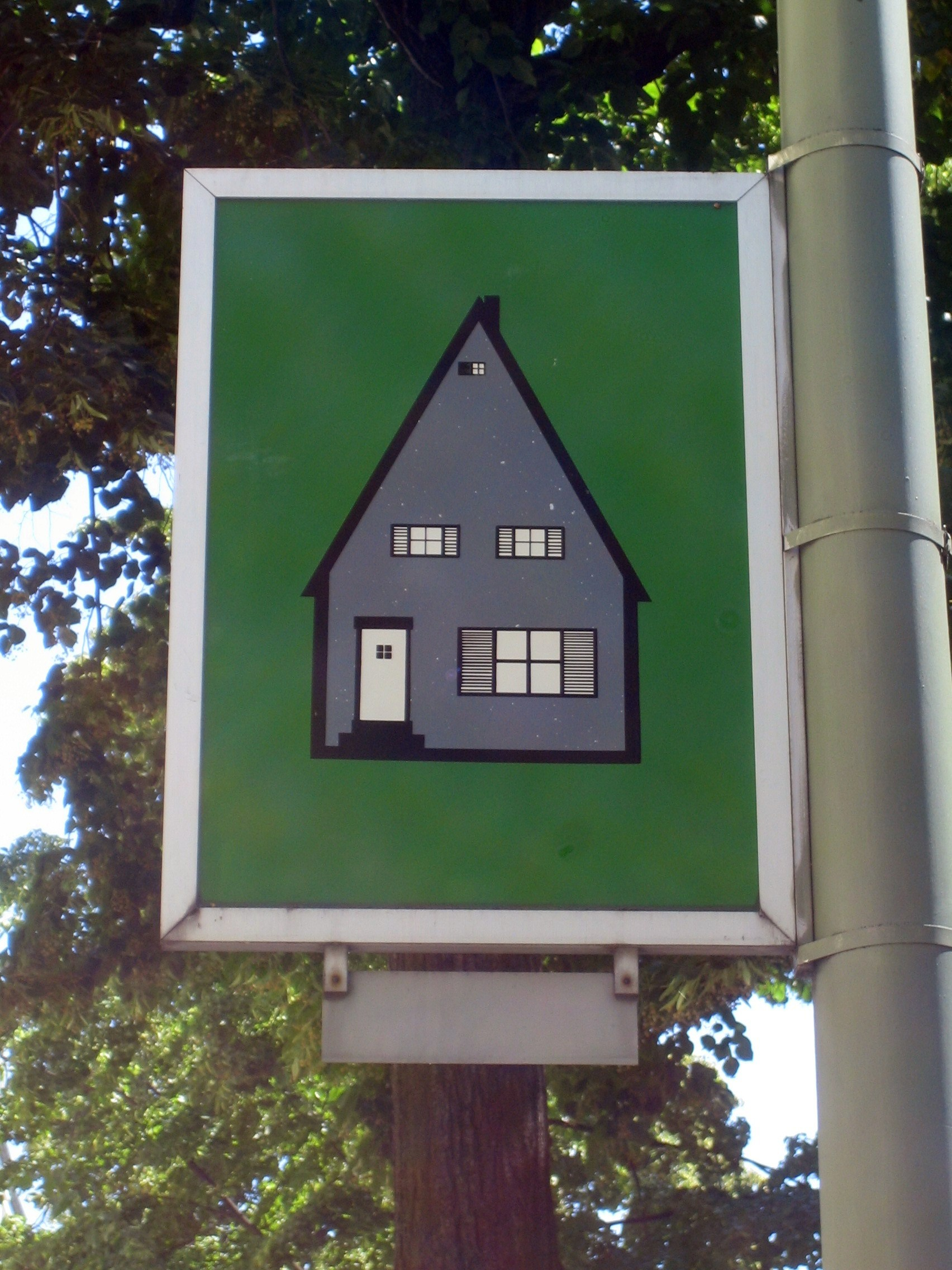
Green sign depicting a gray house

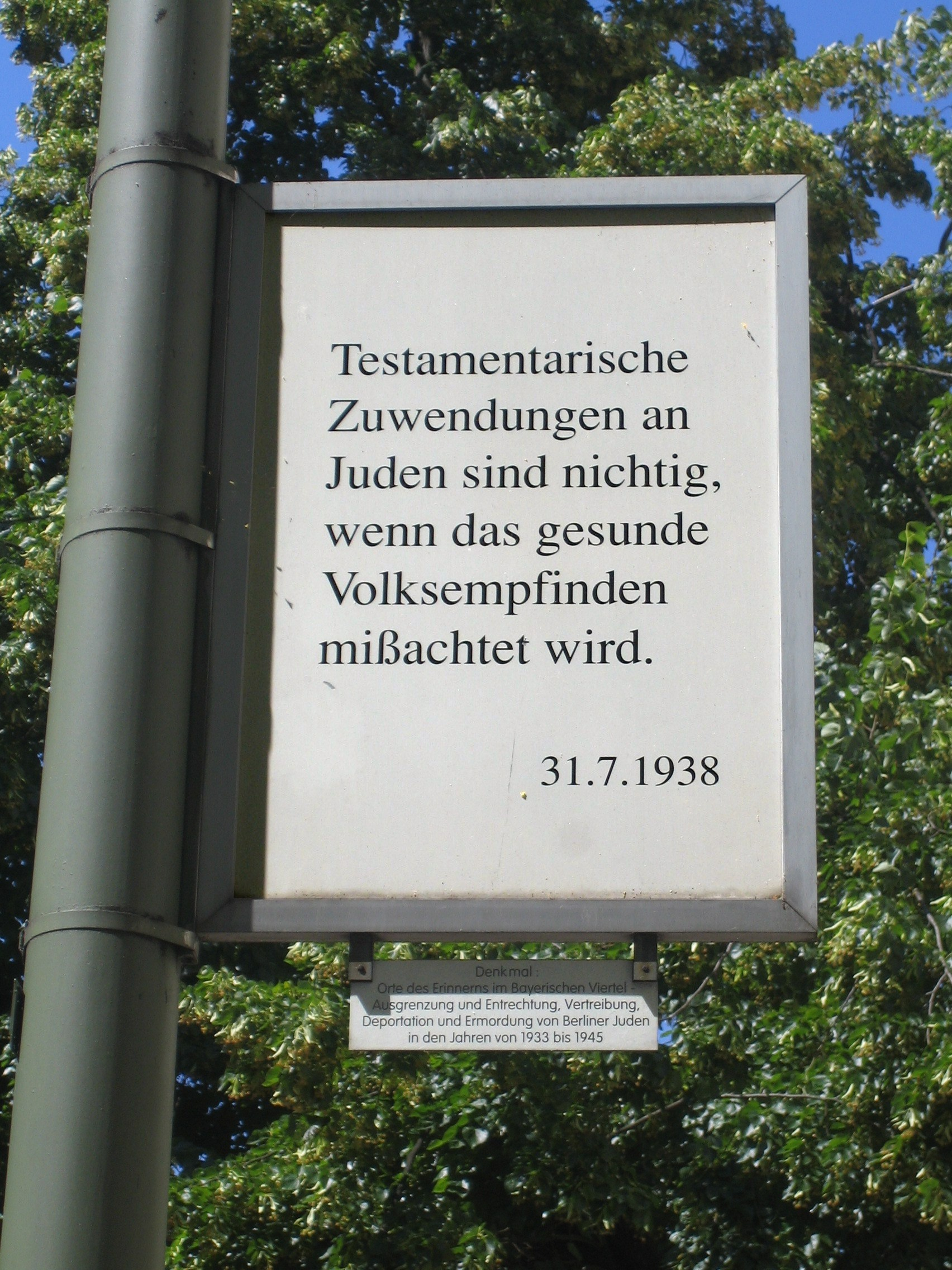
Sign which reads: "Testamentary donations to Jews are null and void if the healthy sentiments of the people are disregarded." The law was set in place July 31, 1942.

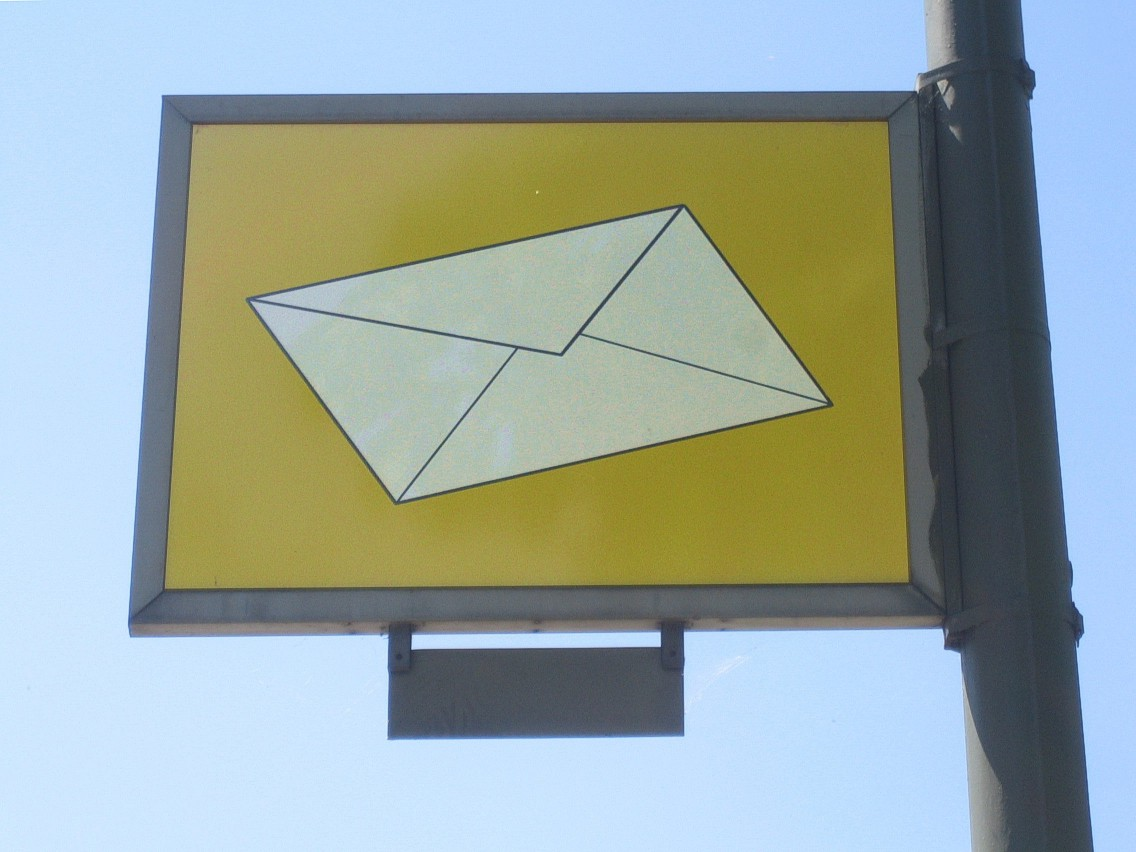
Yellow sign depicting an envelope

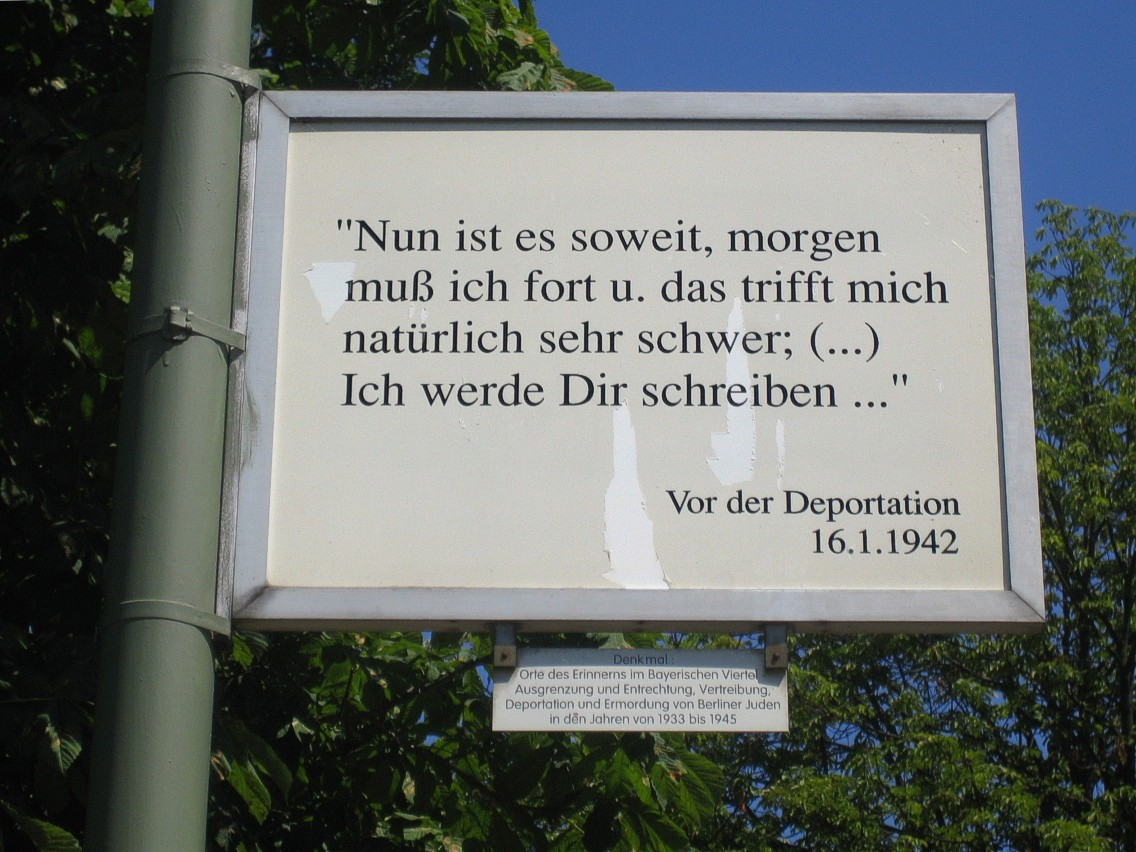
Sign which reads: "Now the time has come, tomorrow I have to leave and of course that hits me very hard; (...) I will write to you..." The law was set in place January 1, 1942.

== Spatial analysis ==
One of the unique features of the Places of Remembrance memorial is its integration within the urban landscape. In other words, the memorial is decentralized, despite the memorial competition requesting a central memorial. The spaces chosen for each of the 80 signs are popular spaces of contemporary times (e.g., a children's playground, a store front).

Through occupying modern day public spaces, the signs force themselves into the everyday lives of the Berlin-Schöneberg neighborhood. The artists thus remind the community of the past trauma of the Jewish deportation, while also affirming the possibility of its return and the need to remember the event's horror.

== Public & media recognition and controversies ==
=== Community reception and media recognition ===
In 1994 for The Washington Post, Rick Atkinson reviewed the memorial's reception. He wrote that the decentralized memorial initially received harsh criticism, such as claims the project was in "bad taste". Historian James Young, in his book At Memory's Edge, wrote that the memorial was first met with a slew of calls to the police complaining about neo-Nazis.

The public outcry, after 17 of the installed signs were removed and two of Stih and Schnock's workers were arrested, led to the signs' addition of a plaque stating its status as part of the memorial. This plaque reads "Denk mal: Orte des Erinnerns im Bayerischen Viertel - Ausgrenzung und Entrechtung, Vertreibung, Deportation und Ermordung von Berliner Juden in den Jahren von 1933 1945" which translates to ""Think: Places of Remembrance in the Bavarian Quarter - Exclusion and disenfranchisement, expulsion, deportation and murder of Berlin Jews in the years 1933 and 1945".

Despite the controversies associated with them, the signs have remained free of vandalism since their installation.

=== Academic reception ===
James Young's At Memory's Edge defines Stih and Schnock's Places of Remembrance as a counter-monument, or a memorial space which in of itself challenges the idea of a monument. By infusing itself in the neighborhood of Schöneberg, the memorial plays an active role in present memory rather than writing off memorialization of the Holocaust as a past conception.

In 2012, Elissa Rosenberg, the director of Bezalel Academy of Art and Design's Undergraduate Program in Landscape Architecture, wrote in The Journal of Architecture that the decentralized monument was an example of walking being used as a commemorative practice.
