= Schichauweg railway station =

Railway station in Berlin, Germany

Schichauweg
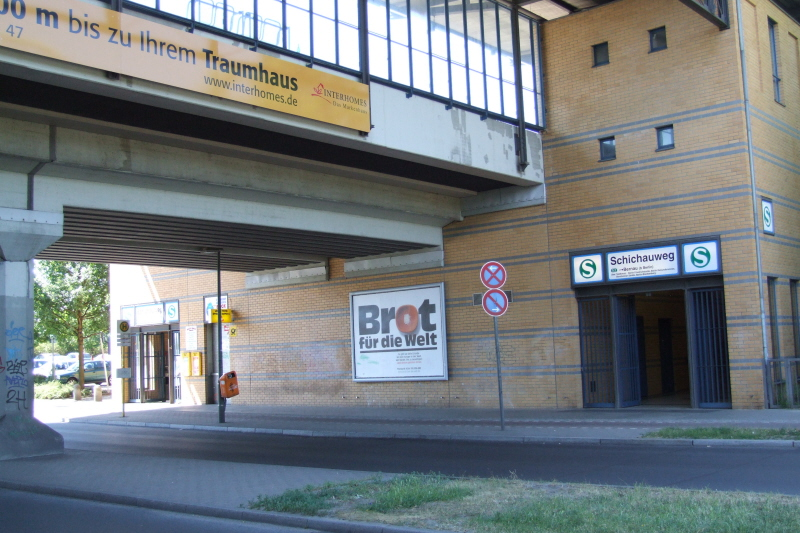

General information
- Location: Lichtenrade, Tempelhof-Schöneberg, Berlin; Germany
- Coordinates: 52°23′55″N 13°23′22″E
- Line: Berlin–Dresden suburban railway (KBS 200.2)
- Platforms: 2

Construction
- Accessible: Yes

Other information
- Station code: 5563
- DS100 code: BSC
- IBNR: 8089038
- Category: 5
- Fare zone: VBB: Berlin B/5656
- Website: www.bahnhof.de

History
- Opened: 1 December 1990; 35 years ago
- Electrified: at opening, 750 V DC system (3rd rail)

Services
Preceding station	Berlin S-Bahn	Following station
Buckower Chaussee towards Bernau	S2	Lichtenrade towards Blankenfelde
Location
- Location within Berlin

Schichauweg station is a station on the Berlin–Dresden railway in the locality of Lichtenrade in the Berlin borough of Tempelhof-Schöneberg. It is served by Berlin S-Bahn line S2.

It was the only new S-Bahn station constructed by the Berliner Verkehrsbetriebe (BVG, Berlin Transportation Company) after it took over the operations of the S-Bahn in West Berlin.

It consists of two side platforms, each of which has exits to the south to the streets of Schichauweg and Barnetstraße. Additional northern entrances were opened from both platforms to the streets of Miethepfad and Kettinger Straße on 25 November 1991.

== History ==
The railway line was opened at ground level through undeveloped land in 1875. There was a signalman's house southwest of the present station.

The line was raised and placed on an embankment in 1938. The Berlin Outer Freight Ring (German: Güteraußenring, GAR) was built at the same time; this ran east–west to the north of the present station. A connecting curve ran between the south and the east and an additional curve was built in 1944 from the south to the west. With the building of a new parallel Berlin outer ring (Berliner Außenring, BAR) in 1951, the Outer Freight Ring lost its function and it was only used for local freight. It has since been closed and it was dismantled in the area north of Schichauweg station.

In the mid-1980s, the single-track railway bridge that had been built in 1938 over the street was replaced by a new two-track bridge.

== Connections ==
The station is served by S-Bahn line S2.

== See also ==
- List of railway stations in Berlin
