= Lichtenrade =

- Quarter of Berlin
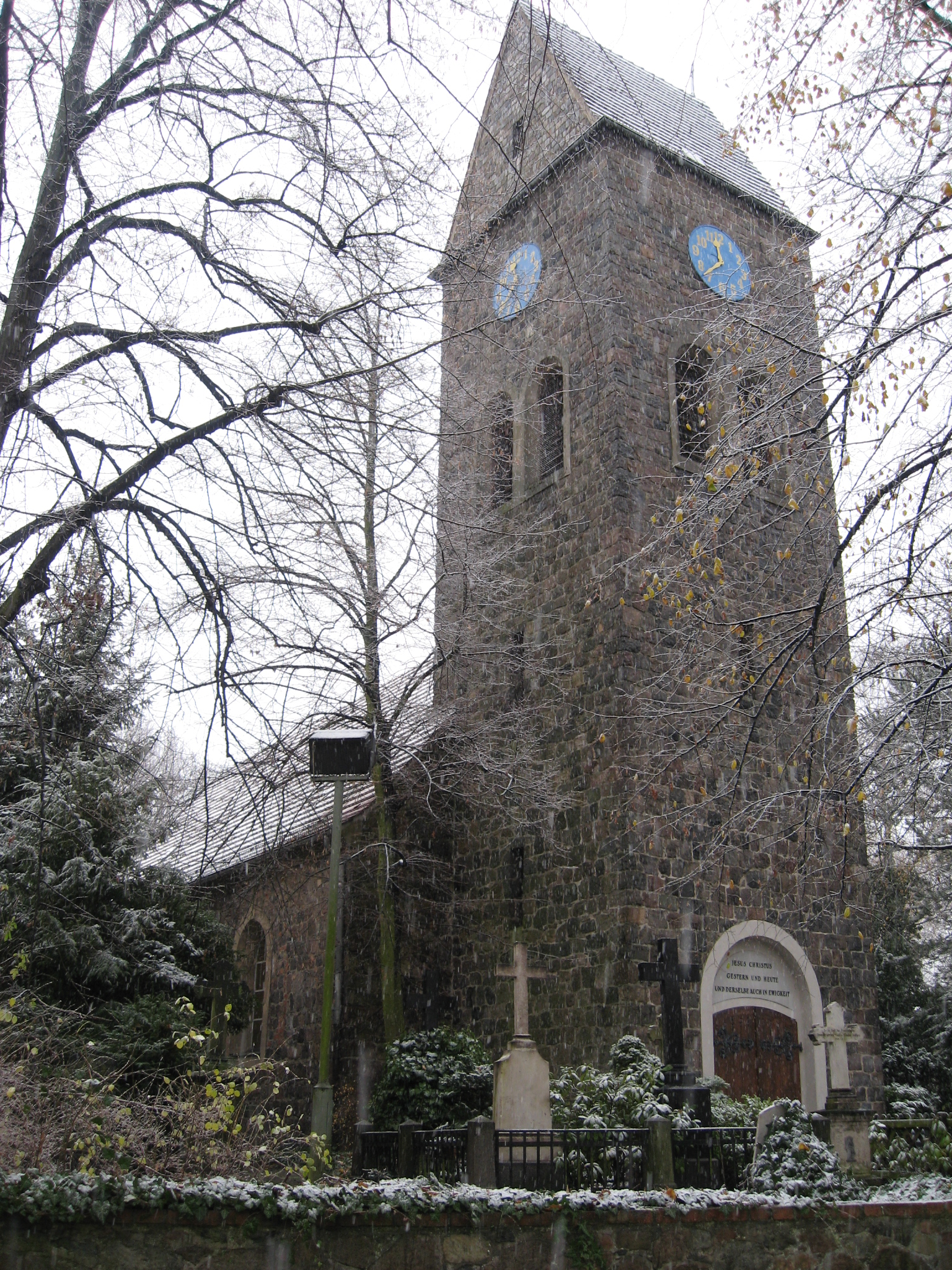
- Village church in winter

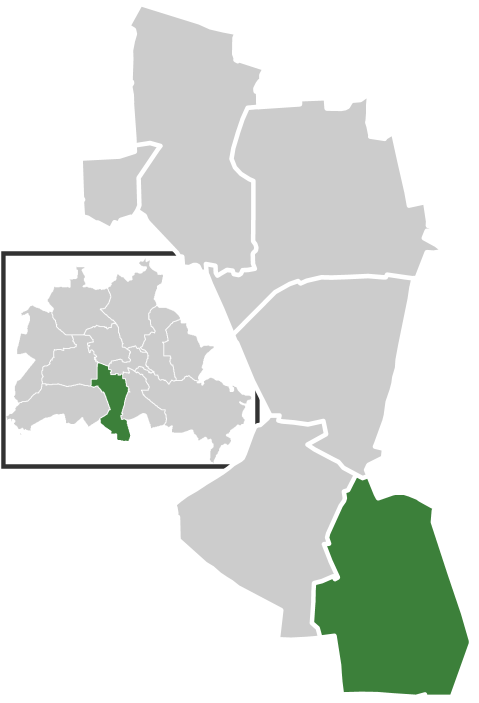
- Location of Lichtenrade in Tempelhof-Schöneberg and Berlin
- Interactive map of Lichtenrade
- Location within Germany Location within Berlin
- Coordinates: 52°24′00″N 13°24′00″E
- Country: Germany
- State: Berlin
- City: Berlin
- Borough: Tempelhof-Schöneberg
- Founded: 1375

Area
  - Total: 10.1 km^{2} (3.9 sq mi)
- Elevation: 50 m (160 ft)

Population (2024-12-31)
  - Total: 52,790
  - Density: 5,230/km^{2} (13,500/sq mi)
- Time zone: UTC+01:00 (CET)
  - Summer (DST): UTC+02:00 (CEST)
- Postal codes: 12305, 12307, 12309
- Vehicle registration: B

Lichtenrade (German: [lɪçtn̩ˈʁaːdə]) is a German locality (Ortsteil) within the borough (Bezirk) of Tempelhof-Schöneberg, Berlin. Until 2001 it was part of the former borough of Tempelhof.

== History ==
The locality was first mentioned in 1375, named Lichtenrode. Autonomous Prussian municipality of the former Teltow district, Lichtenrade was incorporated into Berlin in 1920, with the "Greater Berlin Act". During World War II, a branch of the Sachsenhausen concentration camp was located in this locality. After 1941, prisoners of war from Ukraine were interned in the camp. During the Cold War it was a part of West Berlin bordering with East Germany. Its long boundary with Brandenburg was surrounded by the Berlin Wall from 1961 to 1989.

== Geography ==
Located in the southern suburb of Berlin, it is one of the southernmost areas of the city, largely bounded by the Brandenburger municipalities of Schönefeld (Dahme-Spreewald district), Blankenfelde-Mahlow and Großbeeren (both in Teltow-Fläming district). It borders with the Berliner localities of Marienfelde, Mariendorf and Buckow (this one in the district of Neukölln).

== Transportation ==
Lichtenrade is served by the S-Bahn line S2 at the stations of Schichauweg and Lichtenrade. The locality is also crossed, from north to south, by the federal highway B96.

== Photogallery ==
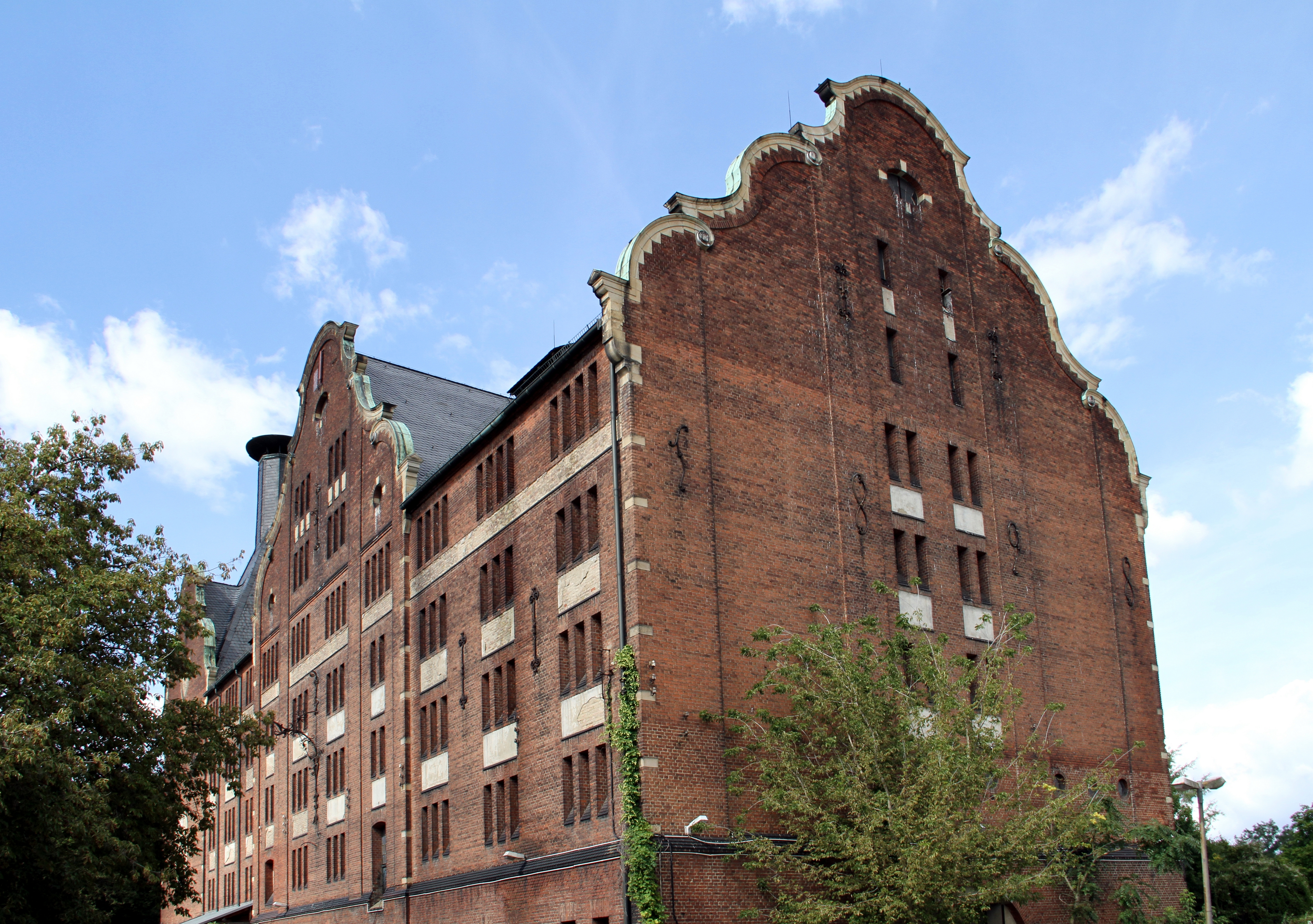
The former malthouse

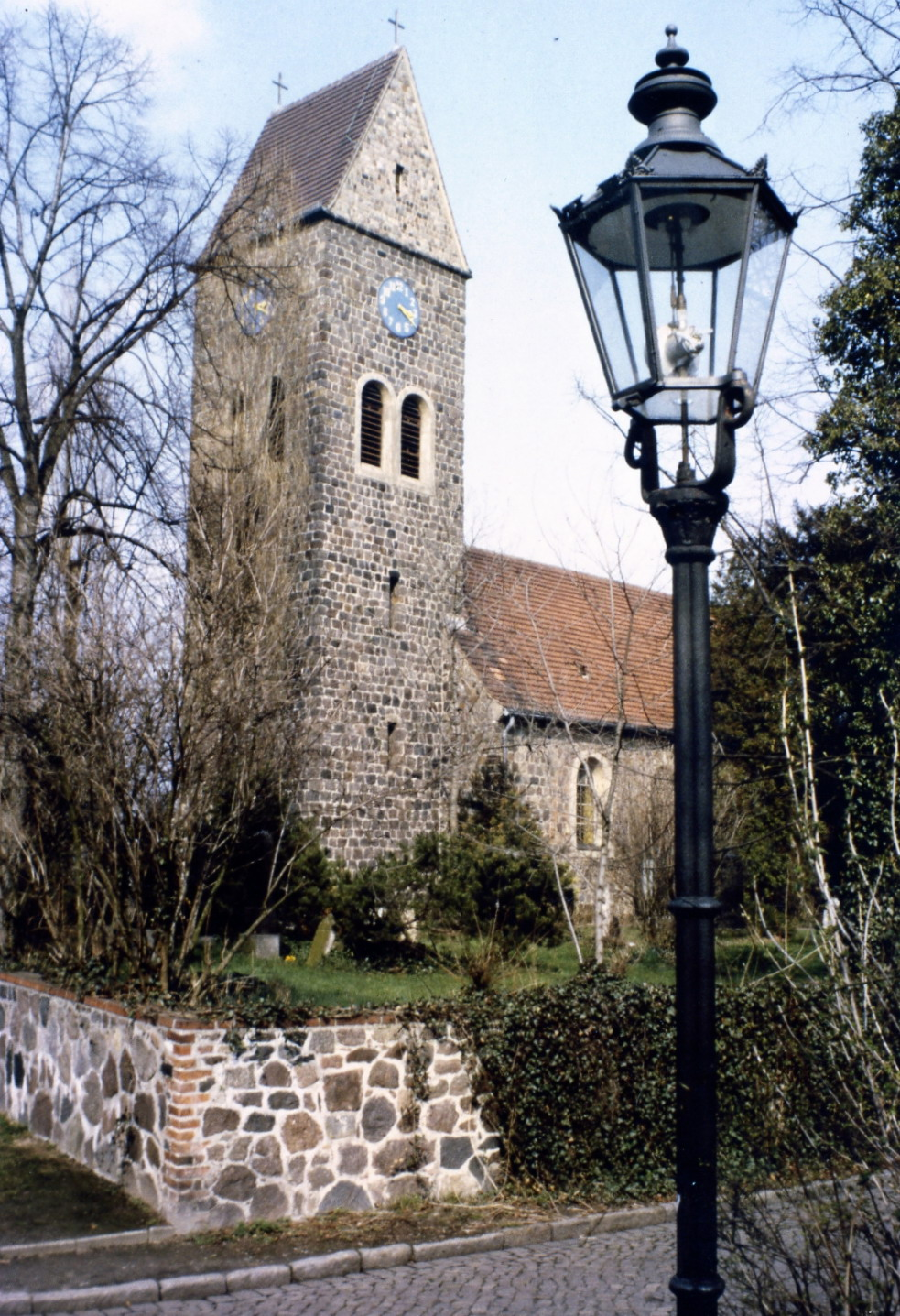
Village church

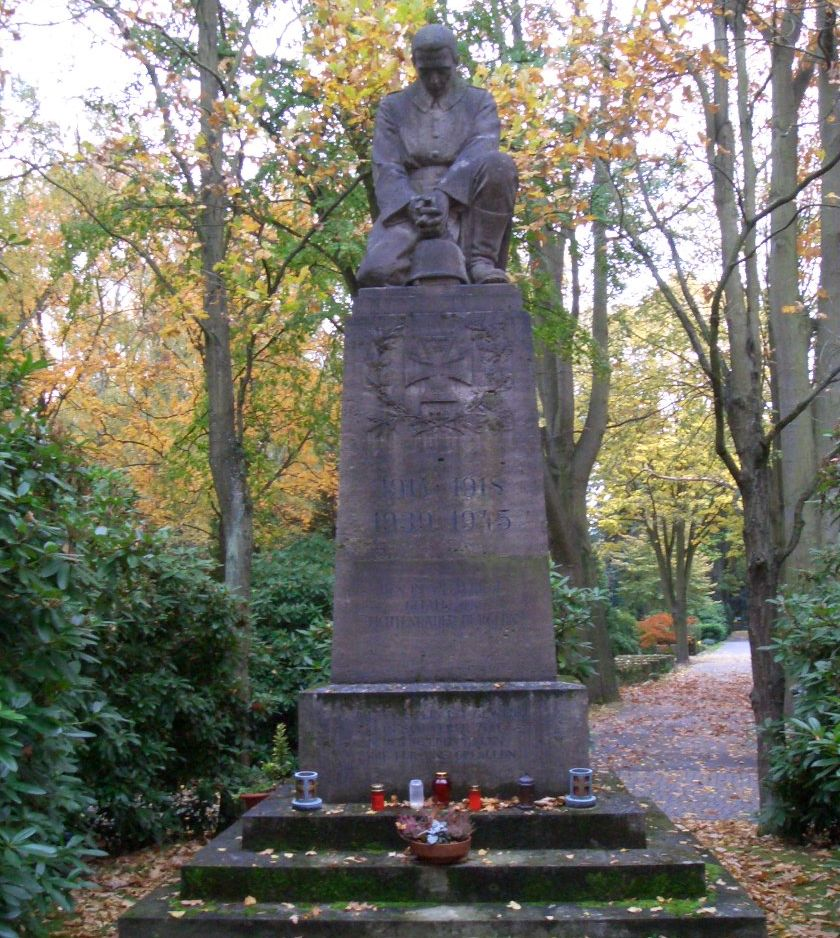
The sculpture "Mutter Erde" by Heinrich Mißfeldt

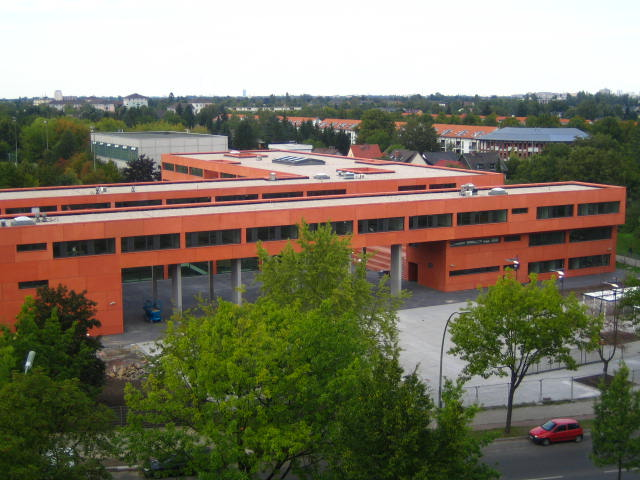
Gymnasium Carl Zeiss

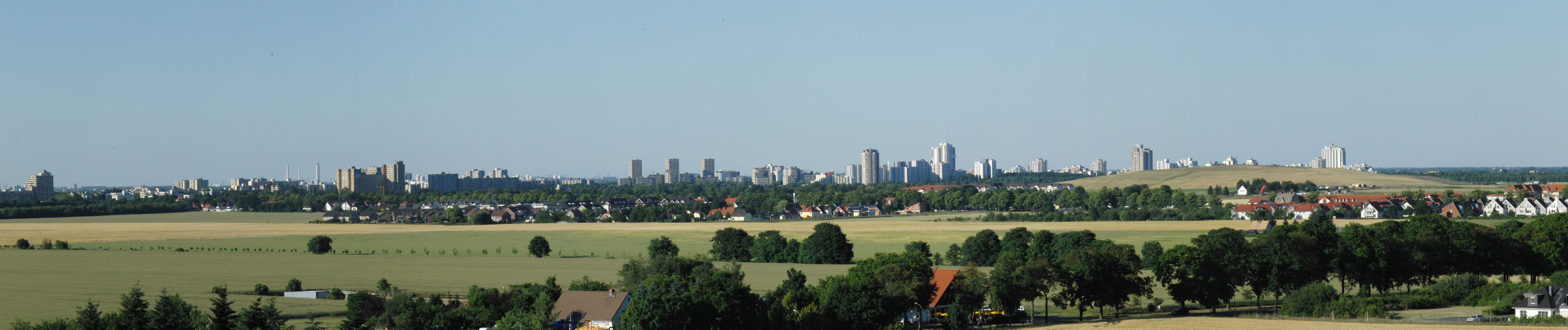
Panoramic view

== Personalities ==
- Christian Fiedler (b. 1975), former football player
- Klaus Wowereit (b. 1953), politician, former mayor of Berlin

== Literature ==
- Barbara Gehrts: "Nie wieder ein Wort davon?". Union Verlag, Stuttgart 1975, ISBN 3-423-07813-8
