= Tempelhof-Schöneberg =

- Borough of Berlin
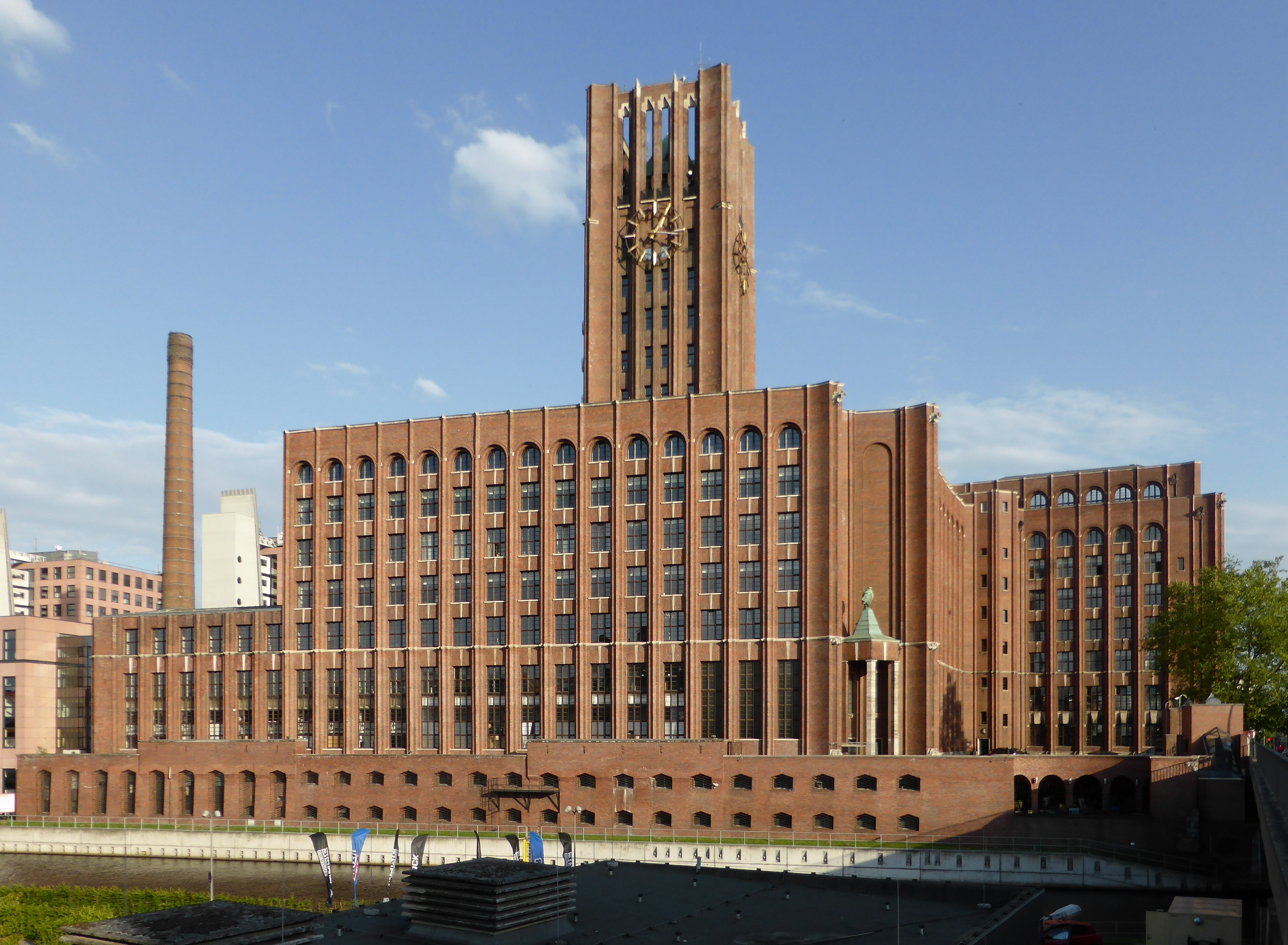
- Ullsteinhaus

- Flag Coat of arms

- Location of Tempelhof-Schöneberg in Berlin
- Interactive map of Tempelhof-Schöneberg
- Location within Germany Location within Berlin
- Coordinates: 52°28′N 13°23′E
- Country: Germany
- State: Berlin
- City: Berlin
- Subdivisions: 6 localities

Government
  - Mayor: Jörn Oltmann (Greens)

Area
  - Total: 53.09 km^{2} (20.50 sq mi)

Population (2024-12-31)
  - Total: 337,361
  - Density: 6,355/km^{2} (16,460/sq mi)
- Time zone: UTC+01:00 (CET)
  - Summer (DST): UTC+02:00 (CEST)
- Vehicle registration: B
- Website: Official website

Tempelhof-Schöneberg (German pronunciation: [ˈtɛmpl̩hoːf ˈʃøːnəˌbɛʁk]) is the seventh borough of Berlin, formed in 2001 by merging the former boroughs of Tempelhof and Schöneberg. Situated in the south of the city it shares borders with the boroughs of Mitte and Friedrichshain-Kreuzberg in the north, Charlottenburg-Wilmersdorf and Steglitz-Zehlendorf in the west as well as Neukölln in the east.

== Subdivision ==
Subdivisions of Tempelhof-Schöneberg

Tempelhof-Schöneberg consists of six localities as from north to south:

- Schöneberg
- Friedenau
- Tempelhof
- Mariendorf
- Marienfelde
- Lichtenrade

== Demographics ==
As of 2010, the borough had a population of 335,060, of whom about 105,000 (31%) were of non-German origin. The largest ethnic minorities were Turks constituting 7% of the population; Poles at 4%; Yugoslavians at 3%; Arabs at 2.5%; Afro-Germans at 1.5% and Russians at 1.3%.

Percentage of the population with migration background	
Germans without migration background/Ethnic Germans	69% (230,100)
Germans with migration background/Foreigners	31% (105,000)
Middle Eastern/Muslim migration background (Turkey, Arab League, Iran etc.)	10.5% (35,000)
Polish migration background	4% (13,000)
former Soviet background (Russia, Ukraine, Azerbaijan, Kazakhstan etc.)	3.0% (10,300)
Yugoslavian migration background	2.7% (9,000)
Afro-German/African background	1.5% (5,000)
Others (Greeks, Italians, East Asians etc.)	9.3% (32,700)

== Politics ==
=== Borough assembly ===
The governing body of Tempelhof-Schöneberg is the borough assembly (Bezirksverordnetenversammlung). It has responsibility for passing laws and electing the city government, including the mayor. The most recent district council election was held on 26 September 2021, leading to a Green-red coalition (Zählgemeinschaft) between the Greens and the Social Democratic Party. The results were as follows:

Party	Lead candidate	Votes	%	+/-	Seats	+/-
Alliance 90/The Greens (Grüne)	Saskia Ellenbeck	42,758	23.6	▲1.7	15	▲2
Social Democratic Party (SPD)	Angelika Schöttler	42,488	23.5	▼1.2	15	±0
Christian Democratic Union (CDU)	Matthias Steuckardt	37,598	20.8	▼0.3	13	▲1
The Left (LINKE)	Elisabeth Wissel	15,999	8.8	▲0.8	5	±0
Free Democratic Party (FDP)	Reinhard Frede	12,747	7.0	▲0.3	4	±0
Alternative for Germany (AfD)	Karsten Franck	10,425	5.8	▼5.3	3	▼3
Tierschutzpartei		5,110	2.8	New	0	New
Volt Germany		3,001	1.7	New	0	New
Die PARTEI		2,924	1.6	▼0.1	0	±0
dieBasis		2,680	1.5	New	0	New
Free Voters		1,940	1.1	New	0	New
Klimaliste		1,701	0.9	New	0	New
Pirate Party Germany		1,072	0.6	▼1.4	0	±0
Ecological Democratic Party		438	0.2	New	0	New
Liberal Democrats		104	0.1	New	0	New
Valid votes		180,985	99.0			
Invalid votes		1,838	1.0			
Total		182,823	100.0		55	±0
Electorate/voter turnout		256,738	71.2	▲7.1		
Source: Elections Berlin

=== District government ===
The district mayor (Bezirksbürgermeister) is elected by the Bezirksverordnetenversammlung, and positions in the district government (Bezirksamt) are apportioned based on party strength. Jörn Oltmann of the Greens was elected mayor on 17 November 2021. Since the 2021 municipal elections, the composition of the district government is as follows:

Councillor	Party	Portfolio
Jörn Oltmann	GRÜNE	District Mayor; Finance, Staff, Economic Development and Planning
Angelika Schöttler	SPD	Deputy Mayor; Urban Development and Logistics
Tobias Dollase	Ind. (CDU)	Education, Sport and Culture
Saskia Ellenbeck	GRÜNE	Public Order, Environment, Roads and Green Spaces
Oliver Schworck	SPD	Youth and Health
Matthias Steuckardt	CDU	Social Affairs and Civil Service
Source: Berlin.de

== Twin towns – sister cities ==
Tempelhof-Schöneberg is twinned with:

- Ahlen, Germany (1964)
- Amstelveen, Netherlands (1957)
- Bad Kreuznach (district), Germany (1964)
- Barnet (London), England, United Kingdom (1955)
- Charenton-le-Pont, France (1984)
- Koszalin, Poland (1995)
- Levallois-Perret, France (1986)
- Mezitli, Turkey (2012)
- Nahariya, Israel (1970)
- Paderborn (district), Germany (1962)
- Penzberg, Germany (1964)
- Teltow-Fläming (district), Germany (1991)
- Werra-Meißner (district), Germany (1957)
- Wuppertal, Germany (1964)

== Culture ==
The Sinfonie Orchester Schöneberg is based in the borough. The amateur symphony orchestra regularly performs at Schöneberg Town Hall which was completed in 1914.

== Sites of interest ==
- Wikimedia Deutschland has its offices in Tempelhof-Schöneberg.
- Places of Remembrance, a memorial consisting of 80 different signs affixed to lampposts in the Bavarian Quarter of Berlin's Schöneberg locality

== See also ==
- Berlin-Tempelhof-Schöneberg (electoral district)
