= Turmstraße station =

Station of the Berlin U-Bahn

Coordinates: 52°31′33″N 13°20′29″E

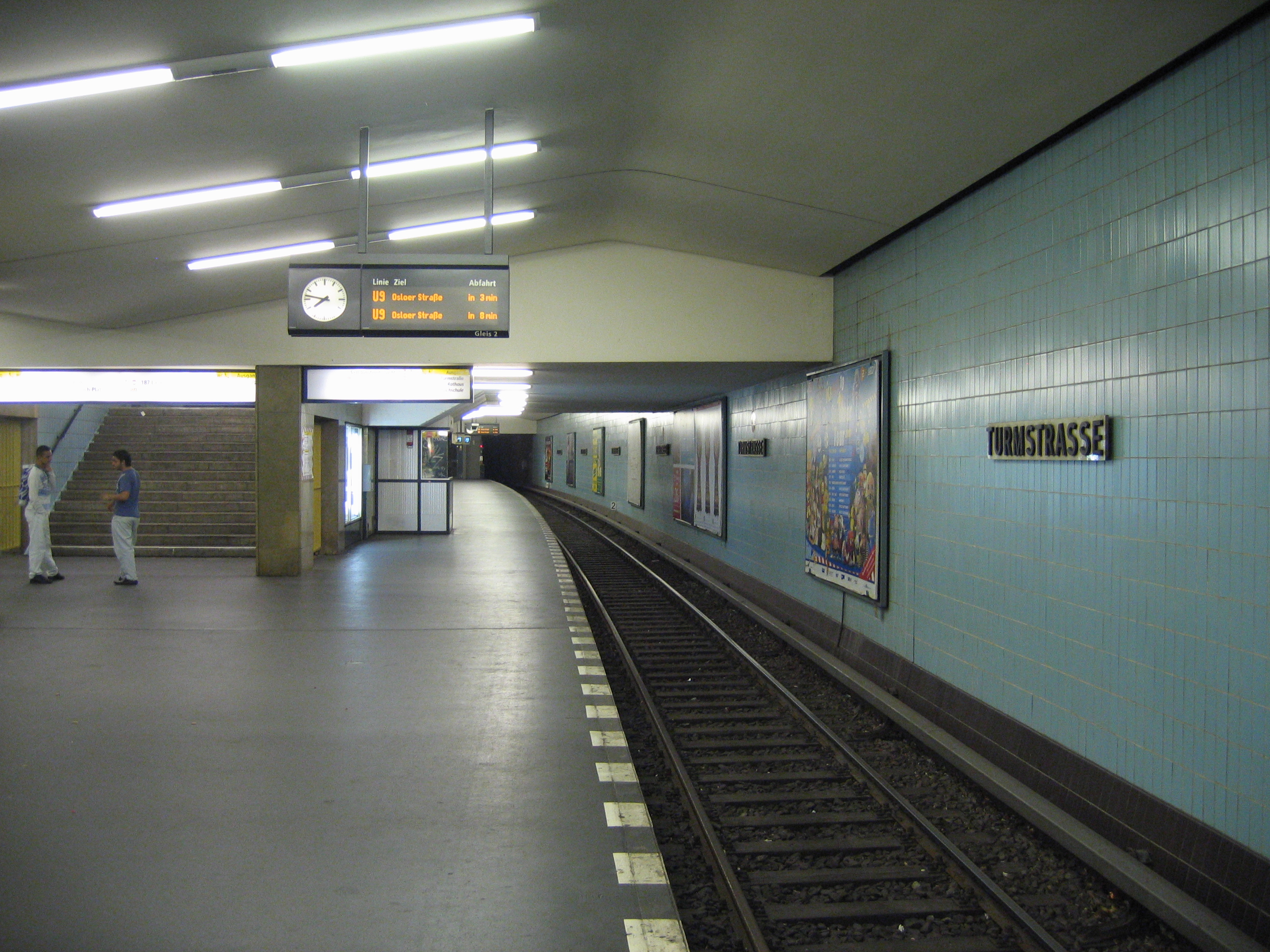
U-Bahn station Turmstraße

Turmstraße is a Berlin U-Bahn station located on the U9 line. The station is located in fare zone A. It was opened on 28 August 1961, and designed by B. Grimmek. The station is beneath the Kleiner Tiergarten park between Turmstraße and Alt-Moabit.

In the station list of the BVG the station bears the designation Tm. To facilitate changing to buses, a central exit was subsequently built in the area of the U5 platform, which comes to the surface on the south side of Turmstraße.

Turmstraße was originally built with an extra platform and segment of tunnel in anticipation of a potential expansion of the U5, which will allow the station to become an interchange station with reduced costs and limited disruption to existing services. The costs amounted to 1.8 million euros.

The train station is 675 meters from Birkenstraße and 919 meters from Hansaplatz.

In the immediate vicinity of the underground station is the operating school underground of the BVG and the control center for monitoring and switching the driving current in the subway network.

The station also serves as the terminus for the Berlin tram line M10.

In early 2026 members of the Abgeordnetenhaus of Berlin concluded the local drug scene had moved from station Leopoldplatz to the station Turmstrasse, with up to 30 addicts present and public consume of Crack cocaine.

Preceding station	Berlin U-Bahn	Following station
Hansaplatz towards Rathaus Steglitz	U9	Birkenstraße towards Osloer Straße
