= Birkenstraße station =

Station of the Berlin U-Bahn

Coordinates: 52°31′56″N 13°20′29″E

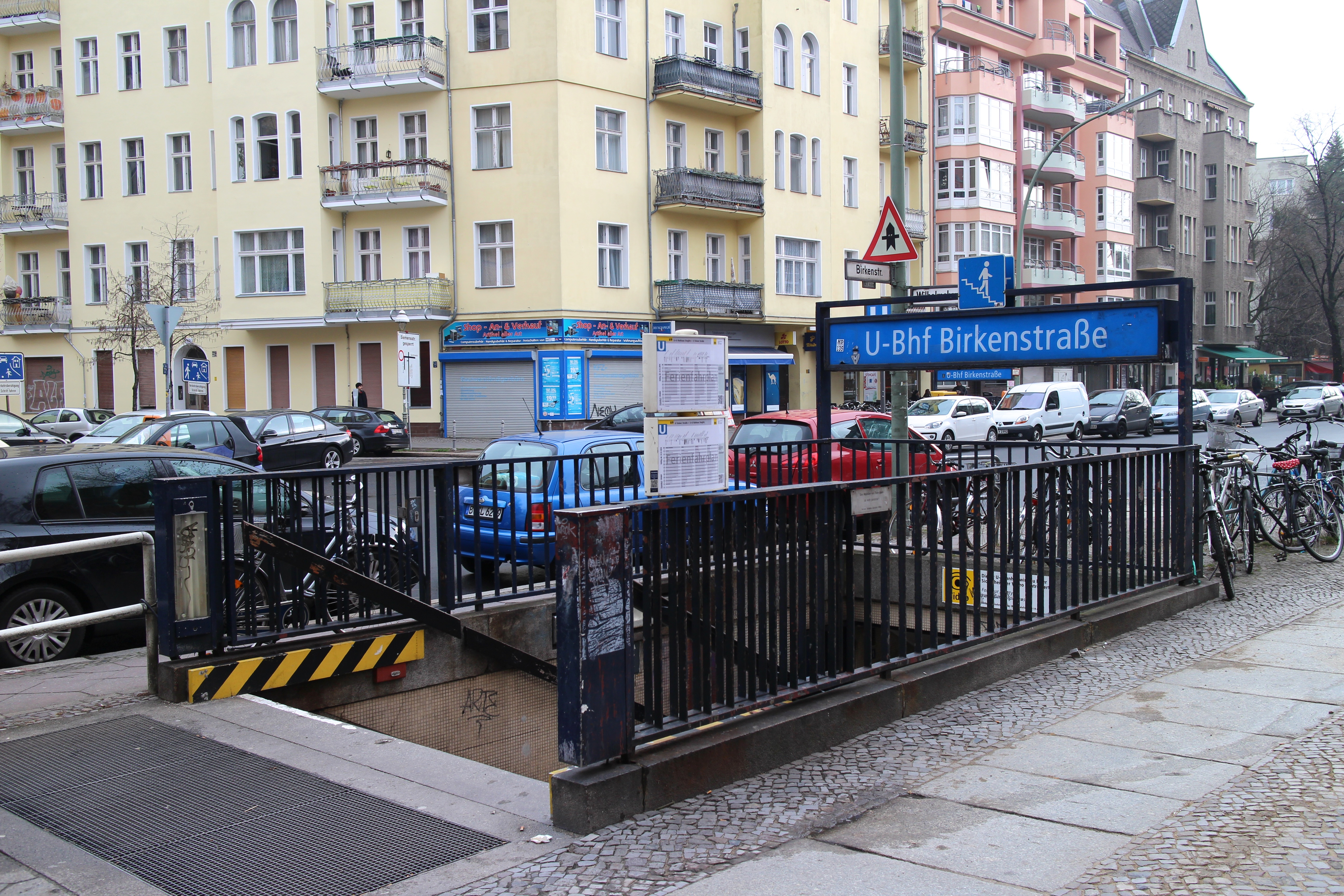
Entrance to the station

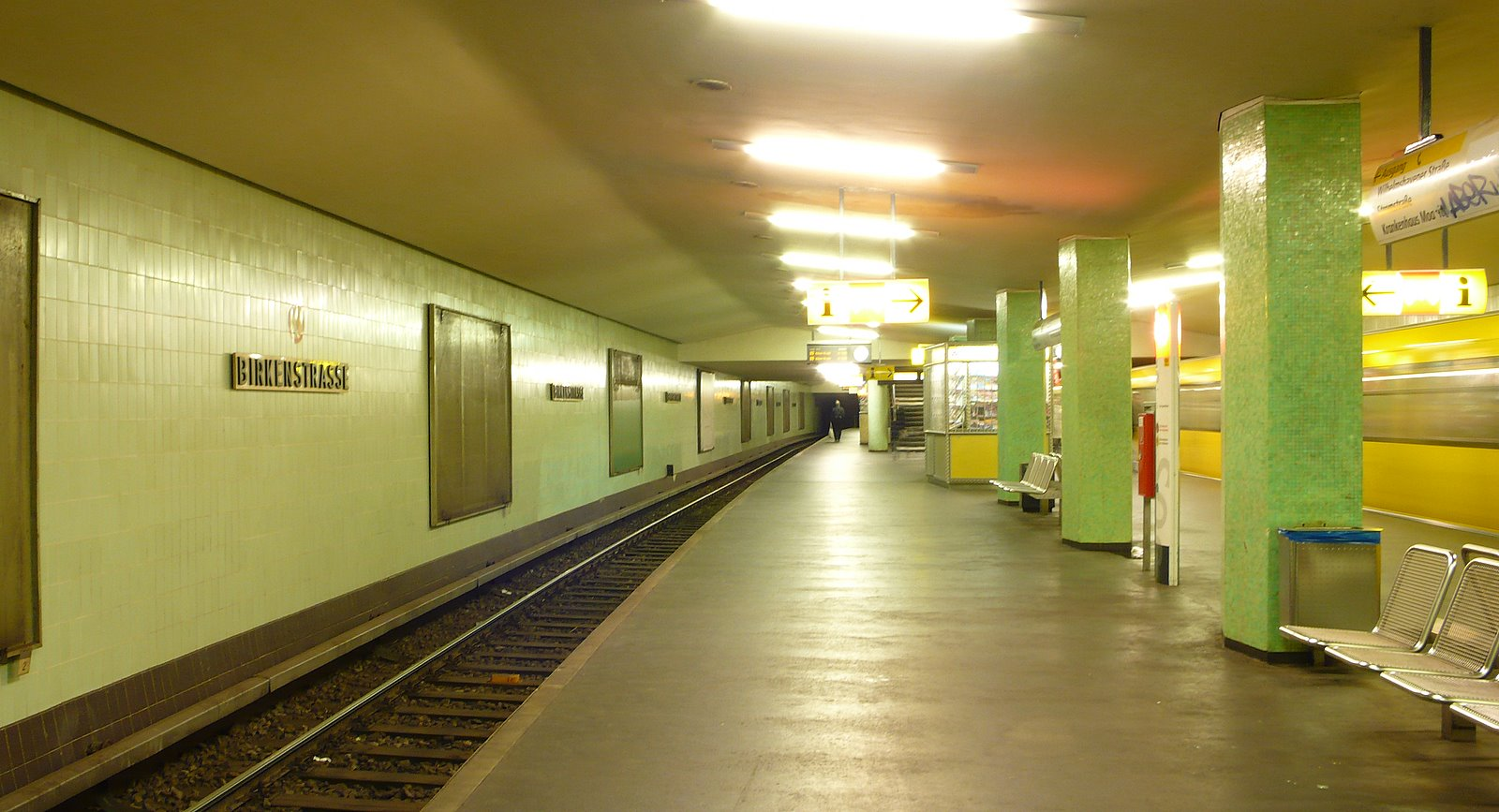
Platform of the station

Birkenstraße is a Berlin U-Bahn station located on the U9 line. It was opened in 1961 by B. Grimmek. There are two entrances to the station, located at the Birkenstraße and Wilhelmshavenerstraße crossroad, on either side of the road. The station's walls are decorated with green tiles in reference to the station's name—the word birke is German for birch tree.

| Preceding station | Berlin U-Bahn | Following station |
|---|---|---|
| Turmstraße towards Rathaus Steglitz | U9 | Westhafen towards Osloer Straße |
