= Berlin Westhafen station =

Railway station in Berlin, Germany

Coordinates: 52.536°N 13.344°E

Westhafen
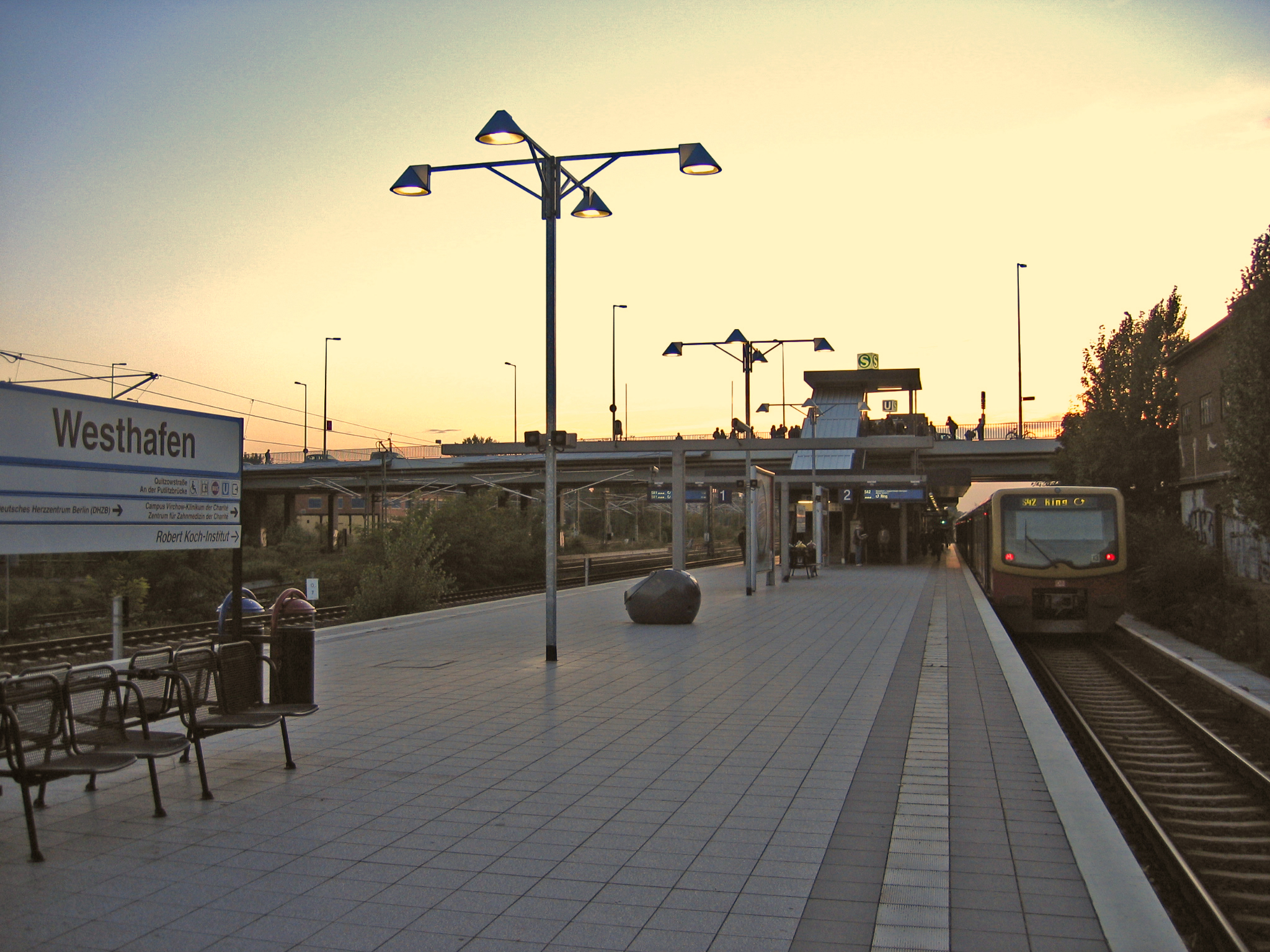
- Westhafen S-Bahn station

General information
- Other names: Westhafen ( only)
- Location: An der Putlitzbrücke Moabit; Moabit, Mitte, Berlin; Germany
- Lines: Ringbahn

Construction
- Architect: : Bruno Grimmek

Other information
- Station code: 7760
- DS100 code: BWF
- Category: 4
- Fare zone: VBB: Berlin A/5555

History
- Opened: Ringbahn: 1 October 1898; 127 years ago : 28 August 1961; 65 years ago reopened: 19 December 1999; 26 years ago
- Closed: strike: 18 September 1980, officially 28 September 1980; 45 years ago
- Electrified: 1 February 1929; 97 years ago
- Former names: 1898-1992 Putlitzstraße

Services
Preceding station	Berlin S-Bahn	Following station
Beusselstraße One-way operation	S41	Wedding Ringbahn (clockwise)
Beusselstraße Ringbahn (counter-clockwise)	S42	Wedding One-way operation
Preceding station	Berlin U-Bahn	Following station
Birkenstraße towards Rathaus Steglitz	U9	Amrumer Straße towards Osloer Straße
Location

Berlin Westhafen is a station in the Moabit district of Berlin. It is served by the S-Bahn lines S41 and S42 and the U-Bahn line U9.

== Overview ==
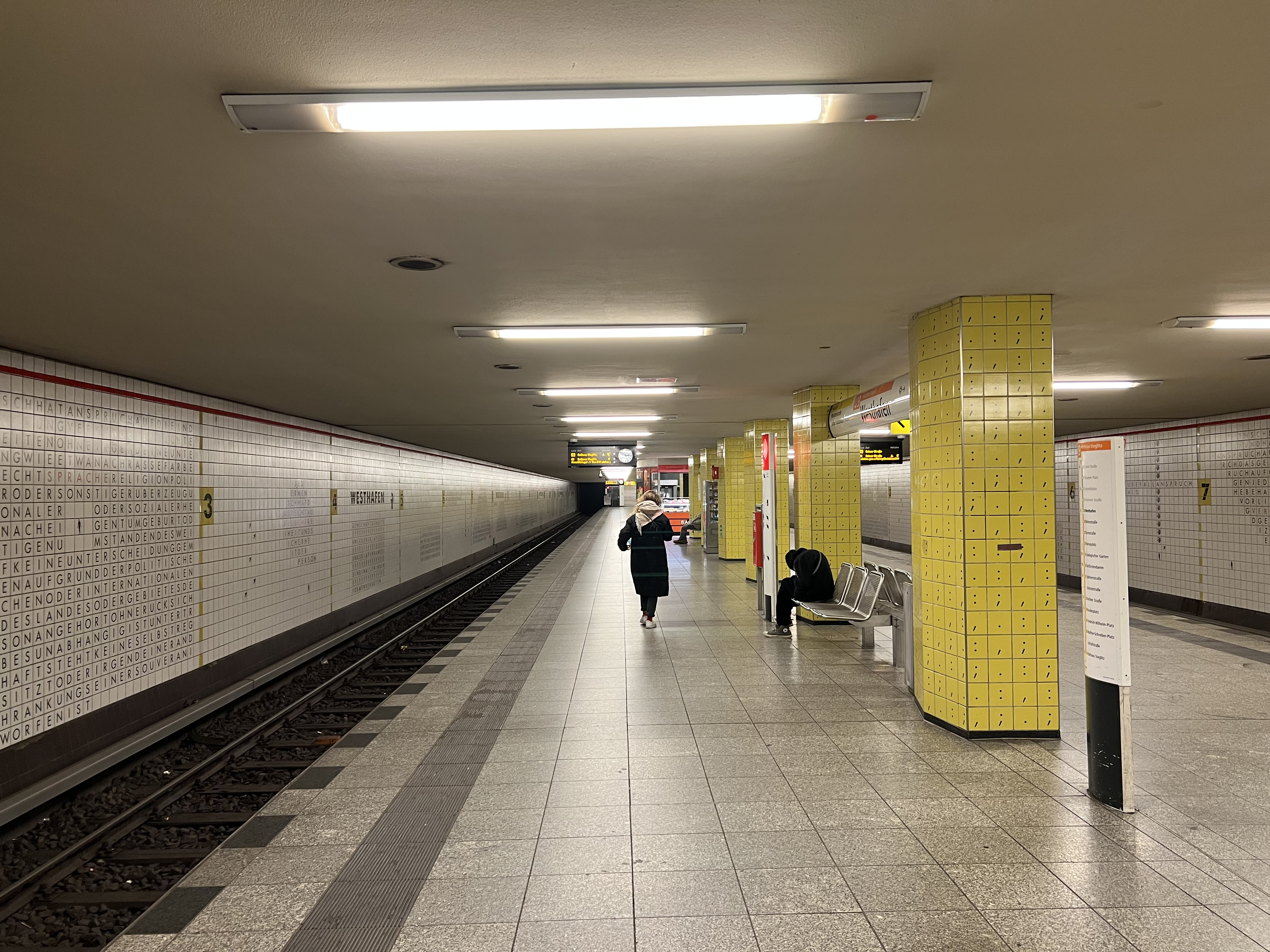
Westhafen U-Bahn station

The S-Bahn station was opened in 1898 under the name Putlitzstraße, which is the street on which the station lies. Despite sustaining damage during the Second World War, the station remained in service. The U-Bahn station was opened on 28 August 1961, soon after the building of the Berlin Wall and also with the name Putlitzstraße, although no direct interchange with the S-Bahn station existed. In 1980 the S-Bahn station lost its service owing to cessation of services on the Western part of the Ringbahn (circle line).

After the Wall fell, S-Bahn services were gradually reinstated. In 1992, the U-Bahn station was renamed Westhafen after the nearby Westhafen port and on its reopening on 19 December 1999, the S-Bahn station also assumed this name. Once one of the least-frequented U-Bahn stations on the network, the whole complex has now won a significance as an interchange between S-Bahn and U-Bahn. In the year 2000, the station was redesigned by artists Françoise Schein and Barbara Reiter: they installed the 1948 text of the Universal Declaration of Human Rights, juxtaposed with quotes of Heinrich Heine in German and French language.
