= Amrumer Straße station =

Station of the Berlin U-Bahn

Coordinates: 52°32′33″N 13°21′01″E

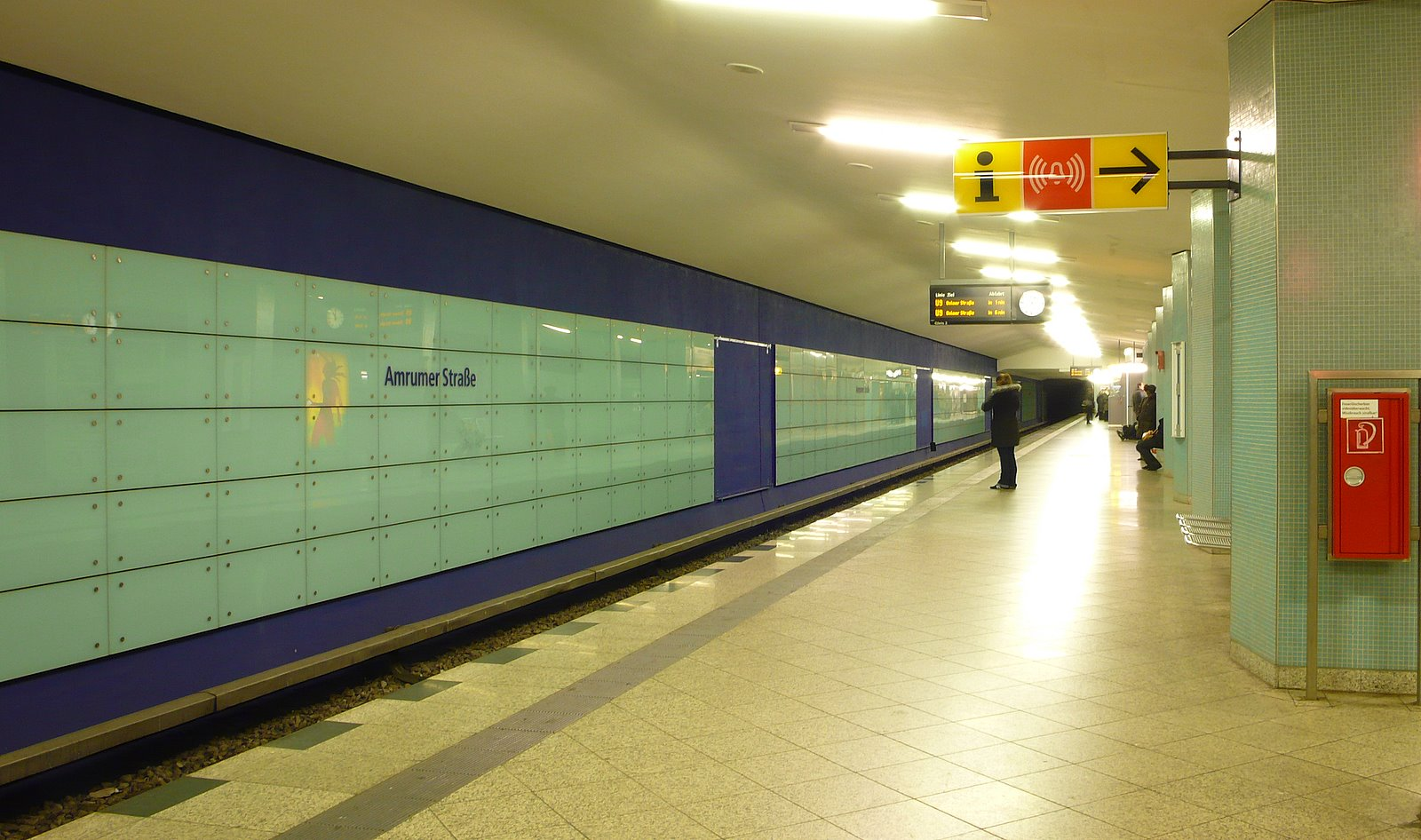
- The platform at U-Bahnhof Amrumer Straße

General information
- Location: Germany

Services
Preceding station	Berlin U-Bahn	Following station
Westhafen towards Rathaus Steglitz	U9	Leopoldplatz towards Osloer Straße
Location

Amrumer Straße is a Berlin U-Bahn station located on the U9.

It was opened in 1961 and constructed by B. Grimmek. The name of the nearby hospital, Rudolf Virchow Hospital (Rudolf-Virchow-Krankenhaus), was part of the name until the end of the 1980s. Today it is still an important station for visitors of the hospital.
