= Hansaplatz station =

Station of the Berlin U-Bahn

Coordinates: 52°31′04″N 13°20′32″E

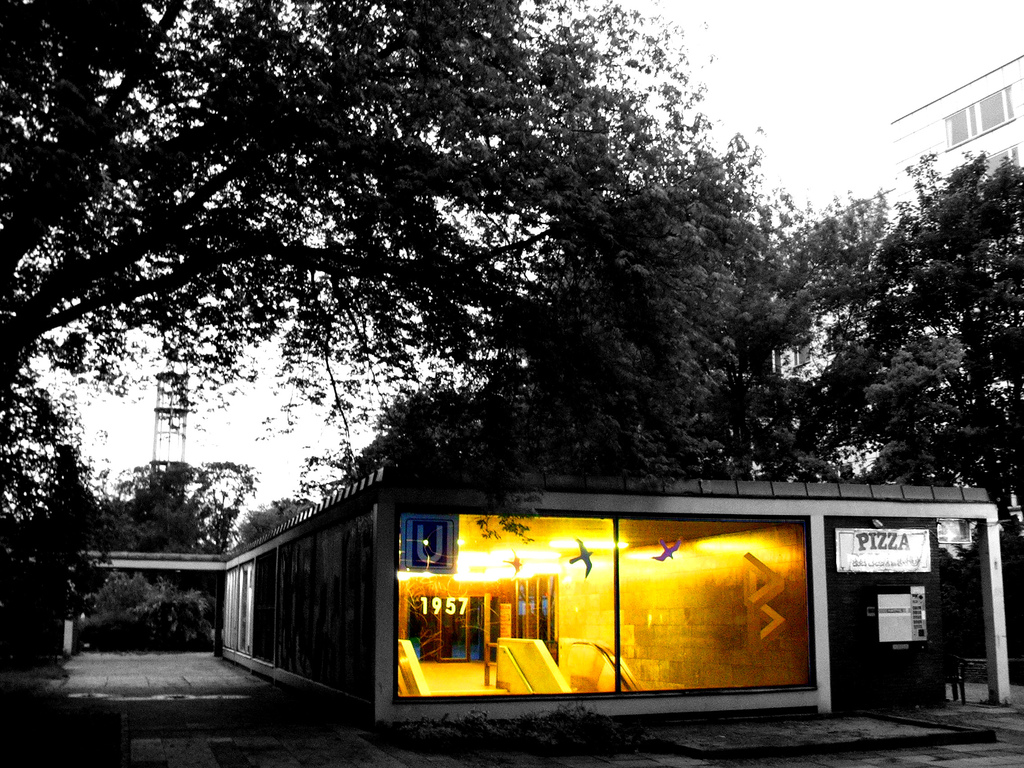
Entrance hall

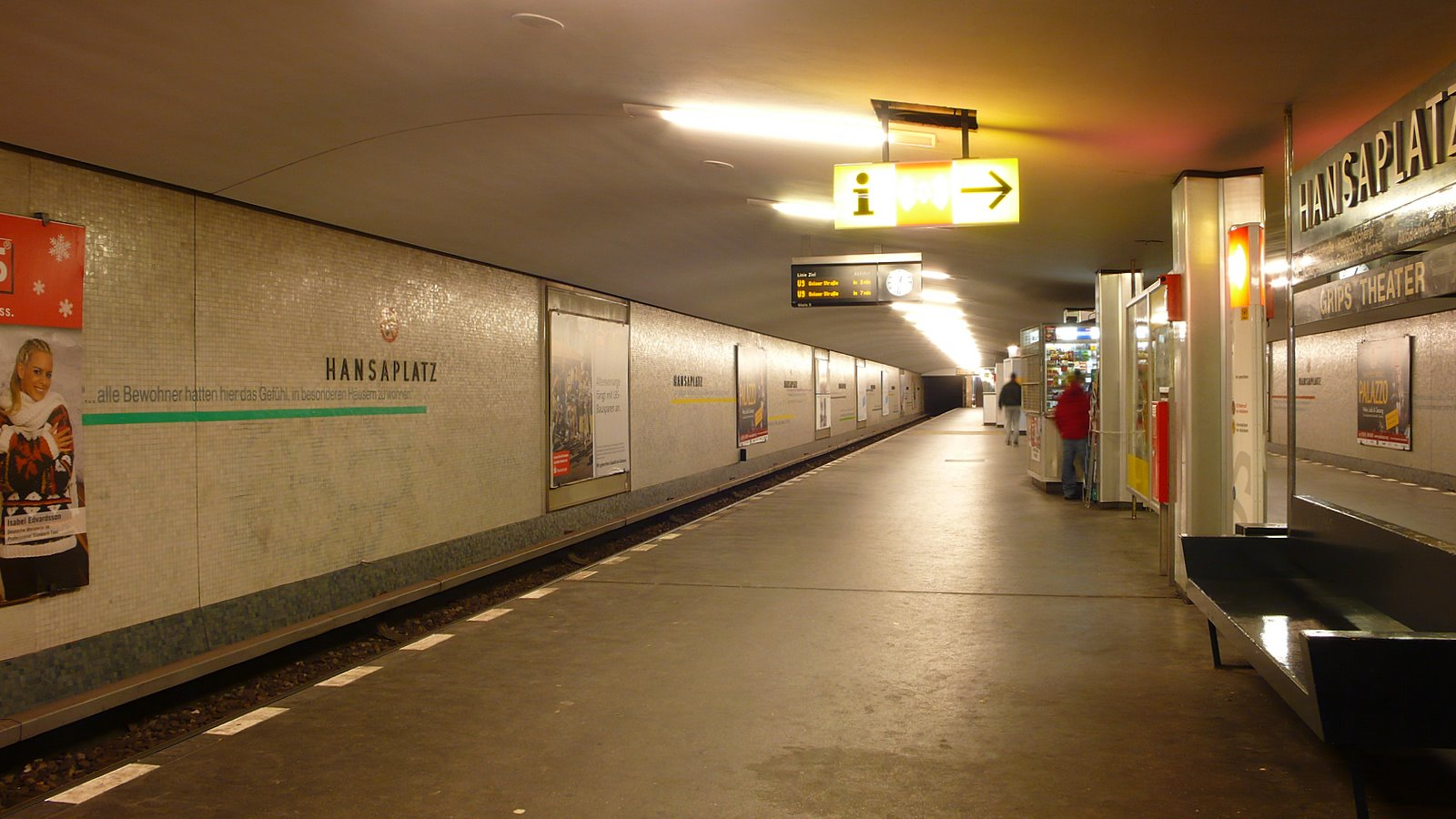
Platform of the U9

Hansaplatz is a Berlin U-Bahn station located on the U9 in the Hansaviertel district. It opened on 28 August 1961 with the first section of the new line running south–north from Spichernstraße to Leopoldplatz. The station itself had been erected as early as 1957 in the course of the Interbau housing development.

Right besides the U-bahn train station is Hansaplatz square. Now a non-discernible traffic junction, this was an active plaza before the war. Led by Kolleg X students from the Bauhaus in Dessau, there is an active movement to reclaim this Plaza as a community space and share it with the cars and bicycles that currently dominate.

Preceding station	Berlin U-Bahn	Following station
Zoologischer Garten towards Rathaus Steglitz	U9	Turmstraße towards Osloer Straße
