= Walther-Schreiber-Platz station =

Station of the Berlin U-Bahn

Coordinates: 52°27′58″N 13°19′42″E

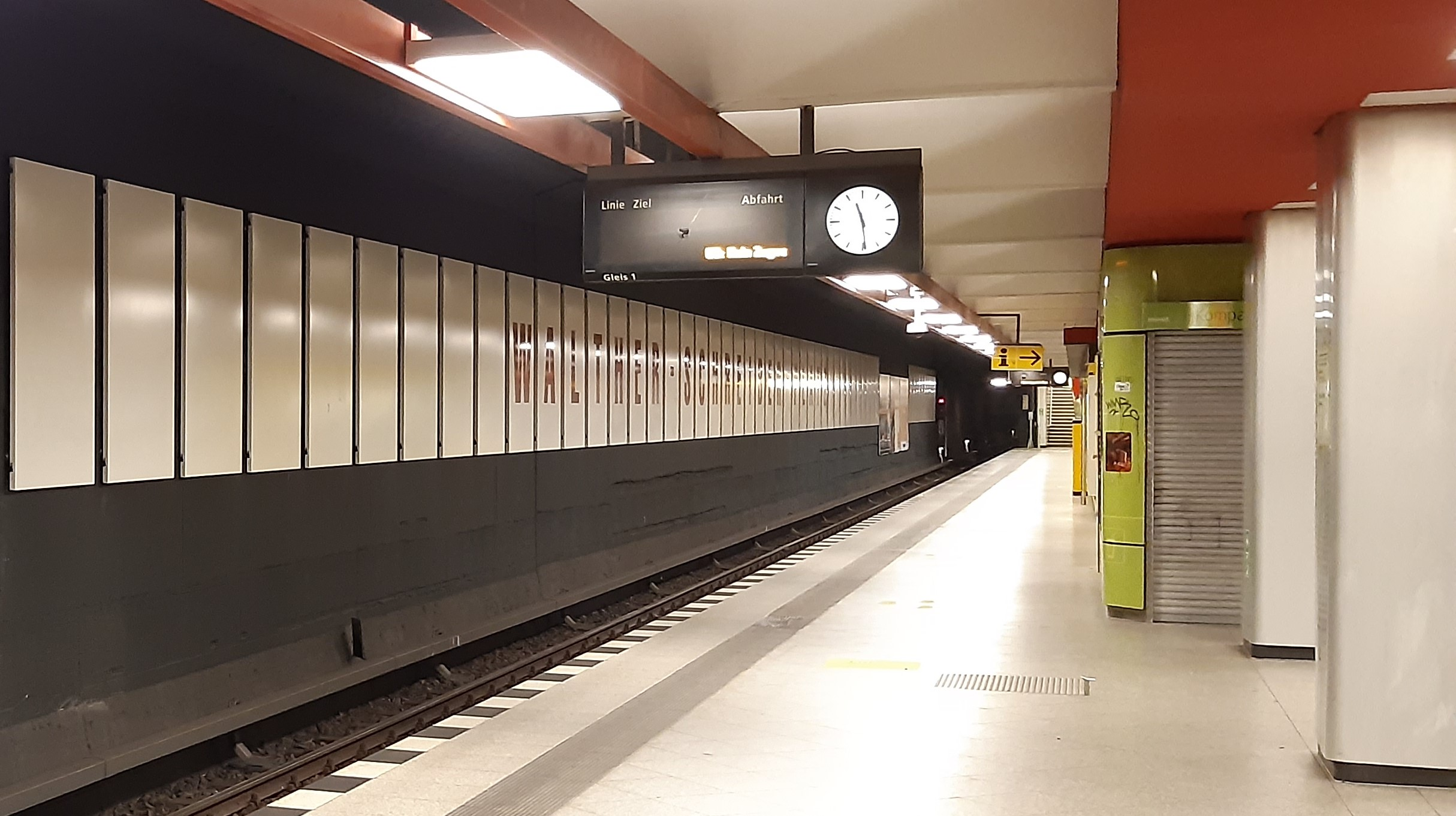
U-Bahn station Walther-Schreiber-Platz in July 2021

Walther-Schreiber-Platz is a Berlin U-Bahn station located on the U9 line in Steglitz-Zehlendorf. Built from 1967 to 1969, the station is located completely under the Bundesallee, which flows into Walther-Schreiber-Platz. The station was opened on 29 January 1971, and until September 1974 was the southern terminus of the former Line 9.

== Overview ==
The station is located in Friedenau, close to the borders with Steglitz. The Schloss-Straßen-Center (SSC) and the Forum Steglitz are located in the immediate vicinity.

Preceding station	Berlin U-Bahn	Following station
Schloßstraße towards Rathaus Steglitz	U9	Friedrich-Wilhelm-Platz towards Osloer Straße
