= Friedrich-Wilhelm-Platz station =

Station of the Berlin U-Bahn

Coordinates: 52°28′19″N 13°19′43″E

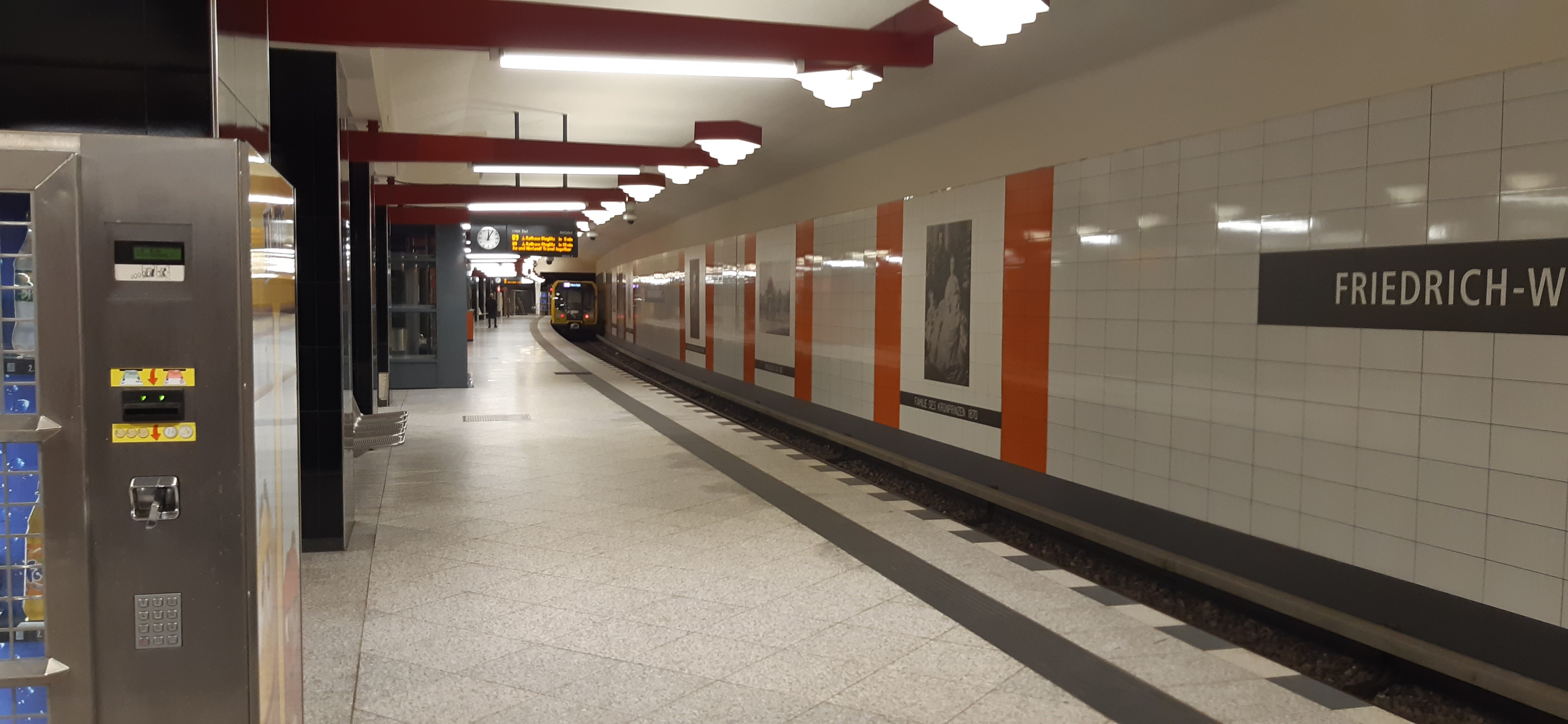
Friedrich-Wilhelm-Platz U-Bahn station

Friedrich-Wilhelm-Platz is a Berlin U-Bahn station located on the U9. It opened for service in 1971.

The station was built adjacent to "Zum Guten Hirten" church (1893) on Friedrich-Wilhelm-Platz, which was named after Friedrich Wilhelm of Prussia, who became emperor under the name Friedrich III, and died after only 99 days' reign. In 1946 there was a proposal to rename the station to Engelsplatz, which was not carried out.

== Notes ==
Preceding station	Berlin U-Bahn	Following station
Walther-Schreiber-Platz towards Rathaus Steglitz	U9	Bundesplatz towards Osloer Straße
