= Berlin Bundesplatz station =

Railway station in Berlin, Germany

Coordinates: 52°28′39″N 13°19′43″E

Bundesplatz
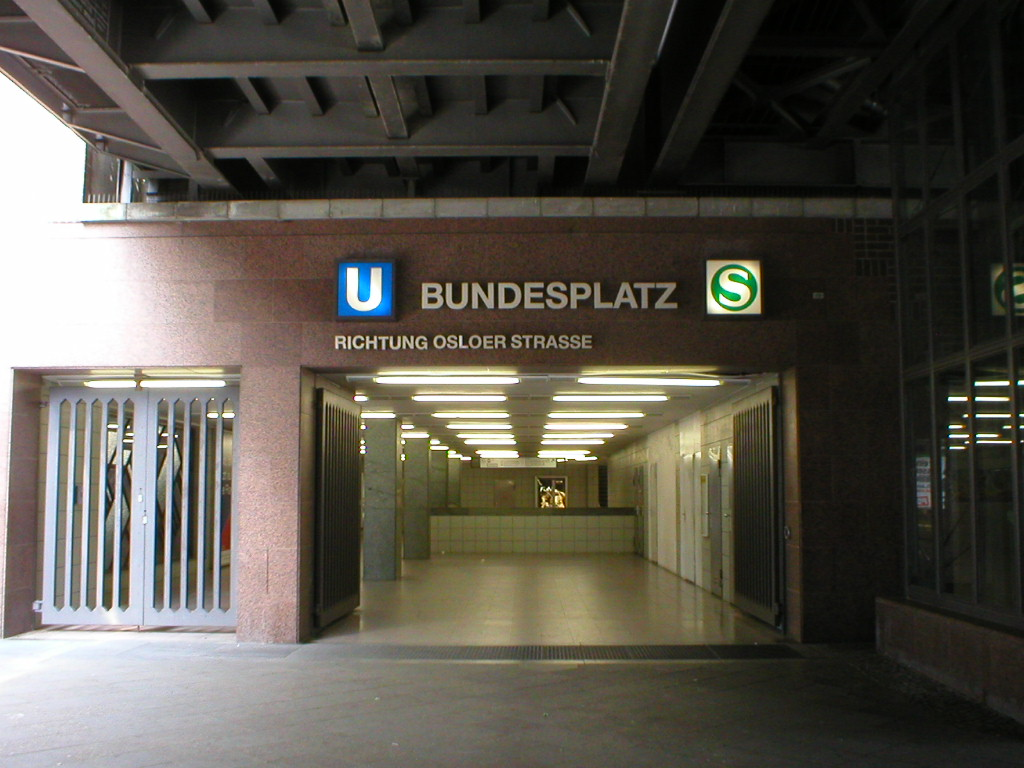
- Entrance to the S-Bahn and U-Bahn station

General information
- Location: Friedenau and Wilmersdorf, Berlin; Germany
- Lines: Ringbahn ( and) and

Other information
- Fare zone: VBB: Berlin A/5555

History
- Opened: Ringbahn: 1 May 1892; 134 years ago : 29 January 1971; 55 years ago reopened: 17 December 1993; 32 years ago
- Closed: strike: 18 September 1980, officially 28 September 1980; 45 years ago
- Electrified: 6 November 1928; 97 years ago
- Former names: 1892-1938 Wilmersdorf-Friedenau; 1938-1980 Wilmersdorf ( only)

Services
Preceding station	Berlin S-Bahn	Following station
Innsbrucker Platz One-way operation	S41	Heidelberger Platz Ringbahn (clockwise)
Innsbrucker Platz Ringbahn (counter-clockwise)	S42	Heidelberger Platz One-way operation
Heidelberger Platz towards Westend	S46	Innsbrucker Platz towards Königs Wusterhausen
Preceding station	Berlin U-Bahn	Following station
Friedrich-Wilhelm-Platz towards Rathaus Steglitz	U9	Berliner Straße towards Osloer Straße
Location

Berlin Bundesplatz is a railway station in the Wilmersdorf district of Berlin. It is served by the S-Bahn lines S41, S42 and S46 and the U-Bahn line U9.

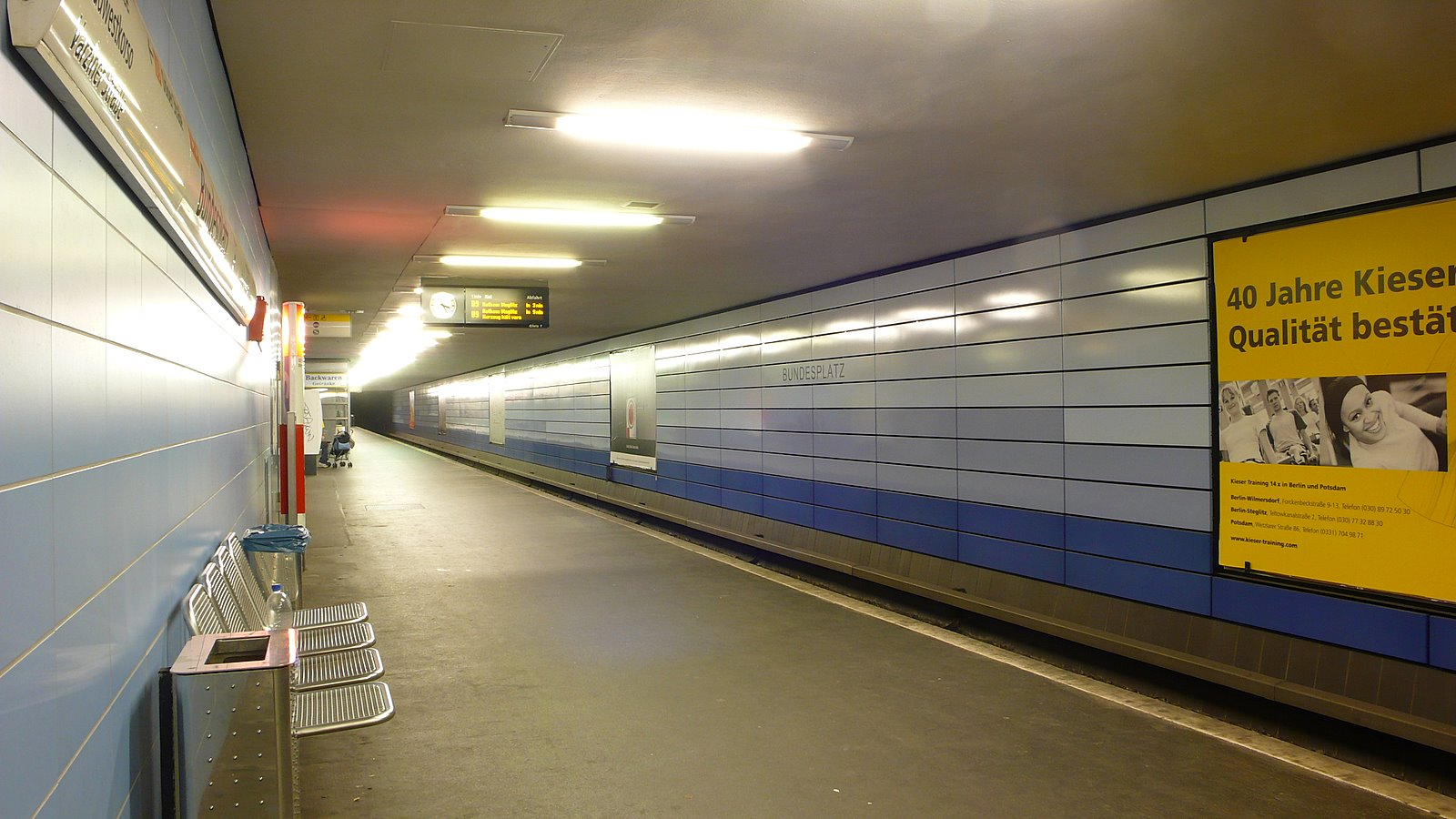
Platform of the underground station

The underground station opened in 1971 and was built by R.G. Rümmler. It has an unusual layout, with the northbound and southbound platforms placed on either side of a highway tunnel, meaning there is no direct connection between the two directions. The two sides also use different color schemes, one having blue and white panels and the other beige and white. The station was renovated in 2004.
