= Friedenau =

- Quarter of Berlin
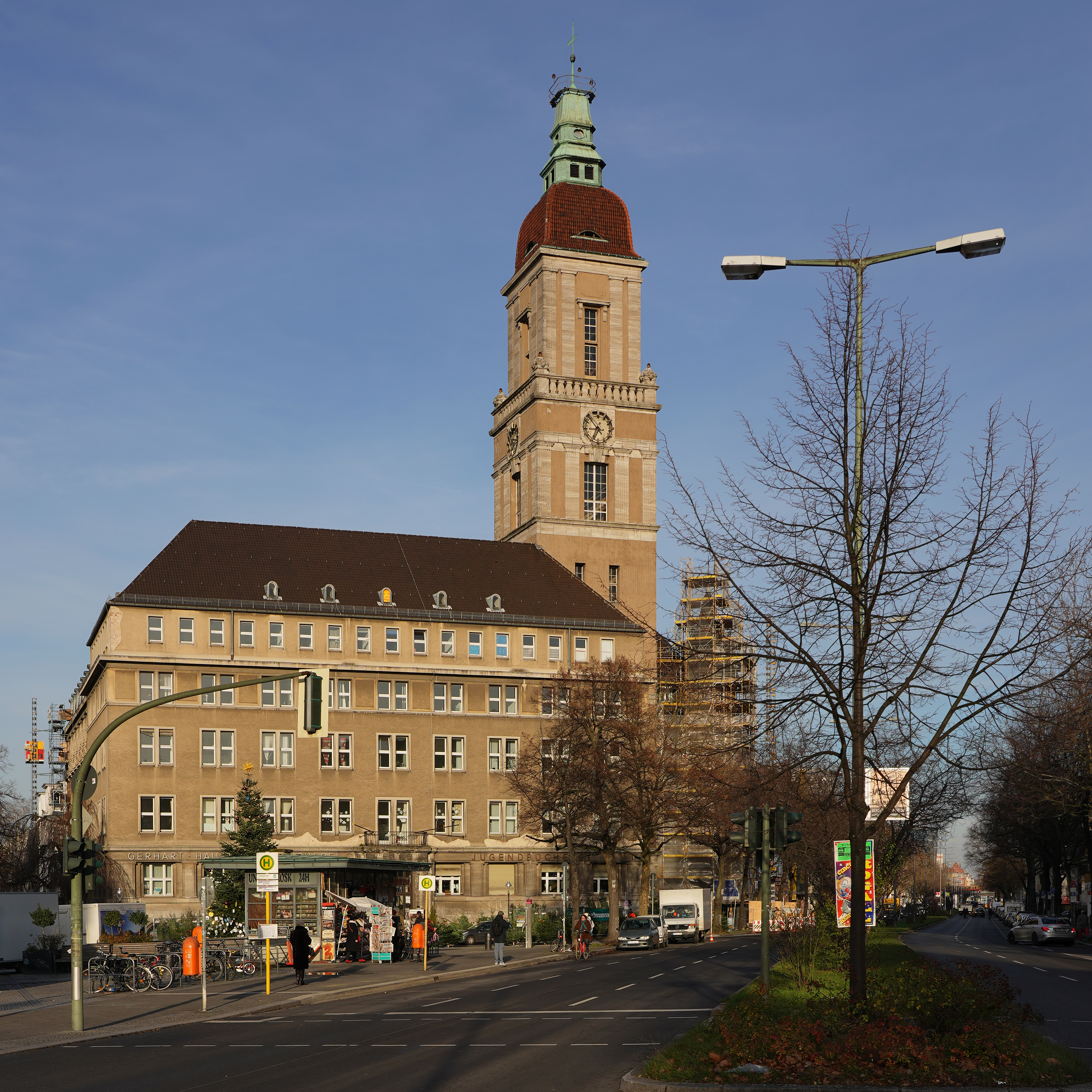
- Town hall

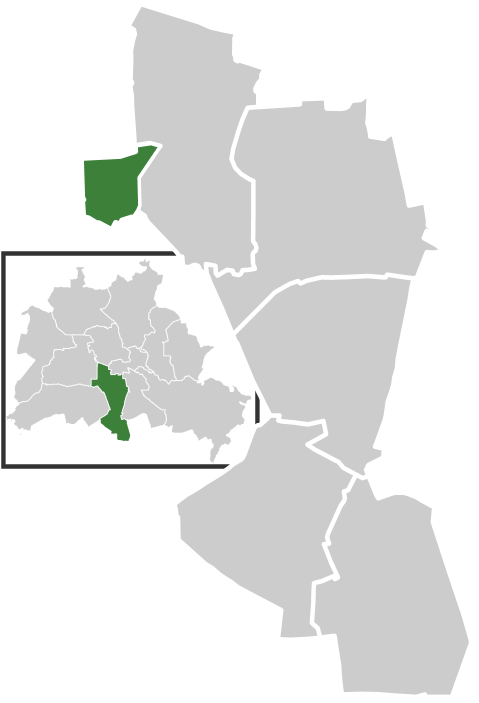
- Location of Friedenau in Tempelhof-Schöneberg and Berlin
- Interactive map of Friedenau
- Location within Germany Location within Berlin
- Coordinates: 52°28′20″N 13°19′47″E
- Country: Germany
- State: Berlin
- City: Berlin
- Borough: Tempelhof-Schöneberg
- Founded: 1871

Area
  - Total: 1.65 km^{2} (0.64 sq mi)
- Elevation: 40 m (130 ft)

Population (2024-12-31)
  - Total: 29,406
  - Density: 17,800/km^{2} (46,200/sq mi)
- Time zone: UTC+01:00 (CET)
  - Summer (DST): UTC+02:00 (CEST)
- Postal codes: 12159, 12161
- Vehicle registration: B

Friedenau (German: [ˌfriːdəˈnaʊ̯]) is a locality (Ortsteil) within the borough (Bezirk) of Tempelhof-Schöneberg in Berlin, Germany. Relatively small by area, its population density was the highest in the city.

== Geography ==
Friedenau is part of the southwestern suburbs, right at the border with the inner city Schöneberg district, separated by the Berlin Ringbahn and the BAB 100 motorway (Stadtring). It borders the Wilmersdorf locality to the west and Steglitz to the south.

The streets and squares are laid out according to a geometric urban design with an almost complete assembly of Gründerzeit buildings, which survived the bombing of Berlin in World War II.

== Urban planning ==
The characteristic feature of Friedenau its Carstenn layout, named after urban developer Johann Anton Wilhelm von Carsten. This symmetrical layout consists of an avenue dividing a circular road, which is demarcated by four town squares.

Some streets in Friedenau were named after rivers in Alsace-Lorraine to commemorate the annexation of this region into the German Empire.

The majority of Friedenau's buildings date to the early 20th century. Therefore, the architectural styles are almost uniform. 185 buildings are protected as cultural heritage sites.

More recent development does not necessarily match the surrounding cityscape, since the reconstruction efforts after World War II, especially in the earlier years, gave little consideration to the preservation of architectural uniformity.

== History ==
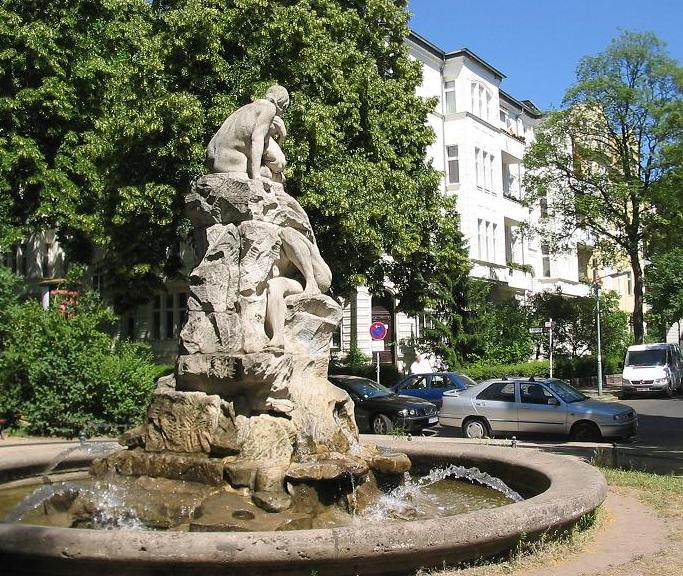
Friedenau: Deluge-Fountain at Perelsplatz

In 1871 it was founded as an affluent commuter town on the estates of the former Deutsch-Wilmersdorf manor. The German name Friedenau, referring to Frieden (peace) and the suffix -au meaning floodplains (hence "floodplain of peace"), was proposed by Hedwig Hähnel, wife of the architect Hermann Hähnel, in memory of the 1871 Peace of Frankfurt, which ended the Franco-Prussian War. It was adopted by Mr. Hähnel, then the director of the Landerwerb- und Bauverein auf Actien (inc.), which developed the real estate in the area. When in 1874 the area constituted as an independent municipality within the Province of Brandenburg, the denotation had already been established and became the official municipal name.

Friedenau opened its own non-denominational municipal cemetery, today's Städtischer Friedhof III, which soon grew too small. So in 1909 Friedenau bought a tract of land in Güterfelde (today a component of Stahnsdorf) as additional graveyard, with the first burial taking place in 1913. Friedenau's municipal construction councillor Hans Altmann designed for the cemetery a mourning chapel, an office, a gardener's house, a flower shop, benches and a fountain as well as a net of paths replicating the streets net in Friedenau. Since June 1913 the cemetery was accessible via the so-called cemetery train line ending at Stahnsdorf station.

Friedenau joined with the town of Schöneberg in 1920 – under the latter's name – as the former 11th administrative borough of Greater Berlin. In the short time from 29 April to 30 June 1945, when the Red Army occupied all Berlin, it was a borough in its own right, until it was reunified with Schöneberg as one borough within the American Sector of West Berlin.

The Güterfelde cemetery, since 1920 called Forest Cemetery of Schöneberg was operated since 1935 by Berlin's Borough of Wilmersdorf, called Wilmersdorf Forest Cemetery Güterfelde (German: Wilmersdorfer Waldfriedhof Güterfelde). After 1945 the cemetery happened to be in the Soviet Zone of Occupation and later in the German Democratic Republic (East Germany), thus with the increasing Eastern interdiction of West Berlin the cemetery grew inaccessible for the Friedenauers.

On 5 April 1986 a bomb exploded at the La Belle discothèque in a former cinema on Hauptstraße 78, killing a Turkish woman and two U.S. servicemen and injuring numerous people. A plaque marks the site.

== Notable people ==
Friedenau has always been home to creative artists, especially of authors. Prominent residents include:

- Max Bruch, composer, Albestraße 3,
- Hans Magnus Enzensberger, poet and writer, Fregestraße 19,
- Max Frisch, architect and writer, Sarrazinstraße 8,
- Günter Grass, writer, Nobel laureate in Literature, Niedstraße 13,
- Georg Hermann, writer, Bundesallee 68 and 108 (at that time Kaiserallee) and Stubenrauchstraße 5,
- Theodor Heuss, the later President of Germany, Fregestraße 80,
- Kurt Hiller, writer, Hähnelstraße 9,
- Hannah Höch, artist, Büsingstraße 16,
- Uwe Johnson, writer, Niedstraße 14 and Stierstraße 3,
- Erich Kästner, writer Niedstraße 5 (with his secretary Elfriede Mechnig),
- Karl Kautsky, politician, Saarstraße 14,
- Heinrich Klemme, film studio founder and director (The Pamir, 1959)
- Adam Kuckhoff, writer, resistance fighter, Wilhelmshöher Straße 18,
- Friedrich Luft, drama critic, Bundesallee 74,
- Rosa Luxemburg, philosopher and economist, Cranachstraße 58,
- Paul Matschie (1861–1926) zoologist
- Hildegard Moniac, educator and acitivst
- Herta Müller, writer, Nobel laureate in Literature, Menzelstraße 2,
- Bernd Pohlenz, cartoonist, Rotdornstraße,
- Rainer Maria Rilke, lyric poet, Rheingaustraße 8,
- Karl Schmidt-Rottluff, painter, Niedstraße 14 and Stierstraße 3,
- Walter Trier, drawer and illustrator, Elsastraße 2,
- Kurt Tucholsky, satirist and writer, Bundesallee 79 (former Kaiserallee).

== Transport ==
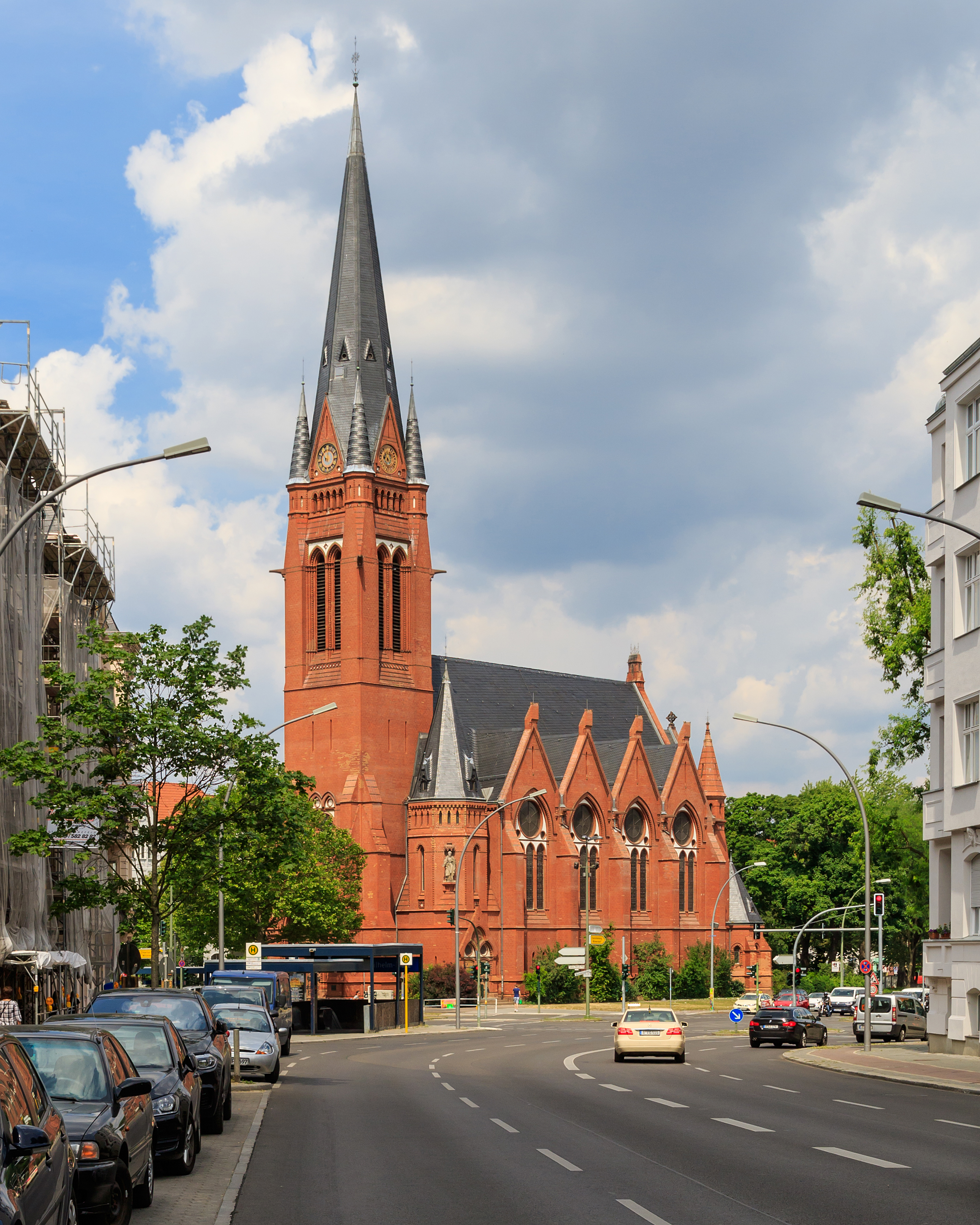
Good Shepherd Church on Friedrich-Wilhelm-Platz

Friedenau has access to the Berlin U-Bahn network at Innsbrucker Platz station (U4) as well as at Bundesplatz, Friedrich-Wilhelm-Platz and Walther-Schreiber-Platz (U9). S-Bahn service is available at the Bundesplatz and Innsbrucker Platz stations of the Ringbahn. The nearby Friedenau station of the S1 line is actually situated in neighbouring Schöneberg.

The locality can also be reached via Bundesautobahn 100 (Stadtring) at Wexstraße and Innsbrucker Platz junctions and by Bundesautobahn 103 (Westtangente), also Bundesstraße 1, at Saarstraße.

== See also ==
- Städtischer Friedhof III
