= Nauener Platz station =

Station of the Berlin U-Bahn

Coordinates: 52°33′06″N 13°22′03″E

Nauener Platz U-Bahn station

Nauener Platz is a Berlin U-Bahn station located on the U9 line. The square that gives it its name is named after the city of Nauen.

It was opened in 1976 by Rümmler. The colors of the station are a reference to the French tricolore as the part of Berlin where the station is, was a part of the French sector.

Preceding station	Berlin U-Bahn	Following station
Leopoldplatz towards Rathaus Steglitz	U9	Osloer Straße Terminus
