= Schloßstraße station =

Station of the Berlin U-Bahn

Coordinates: 52°27′39″N 13°19′28″E

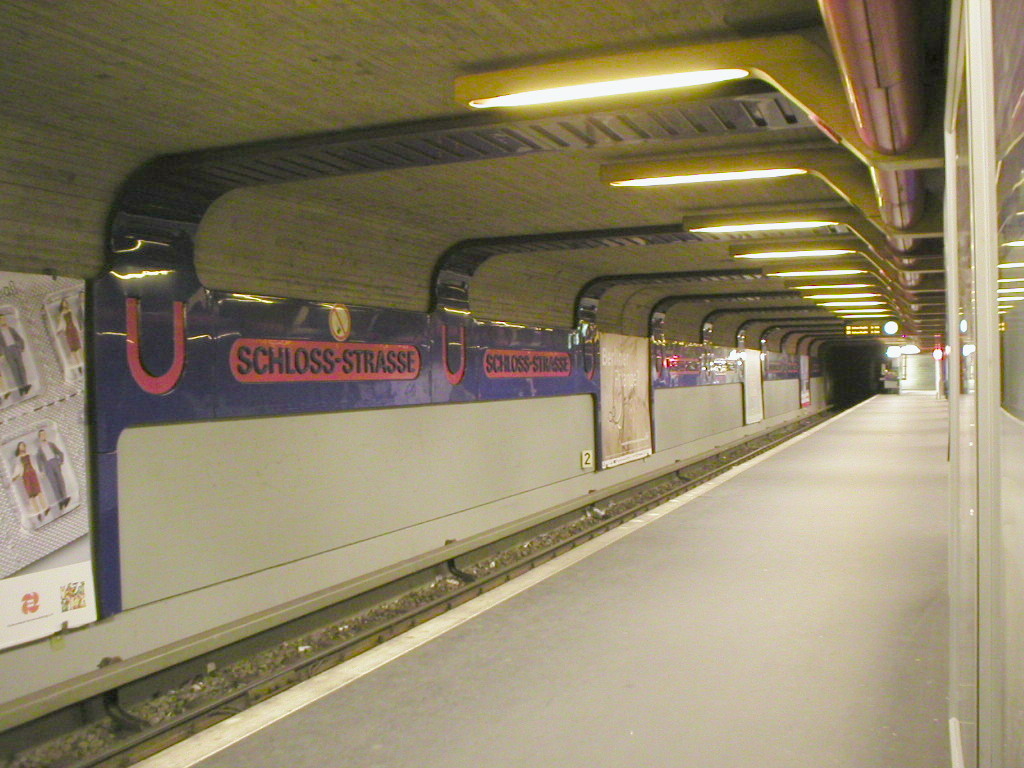
U-Bahn station Schloßstraße

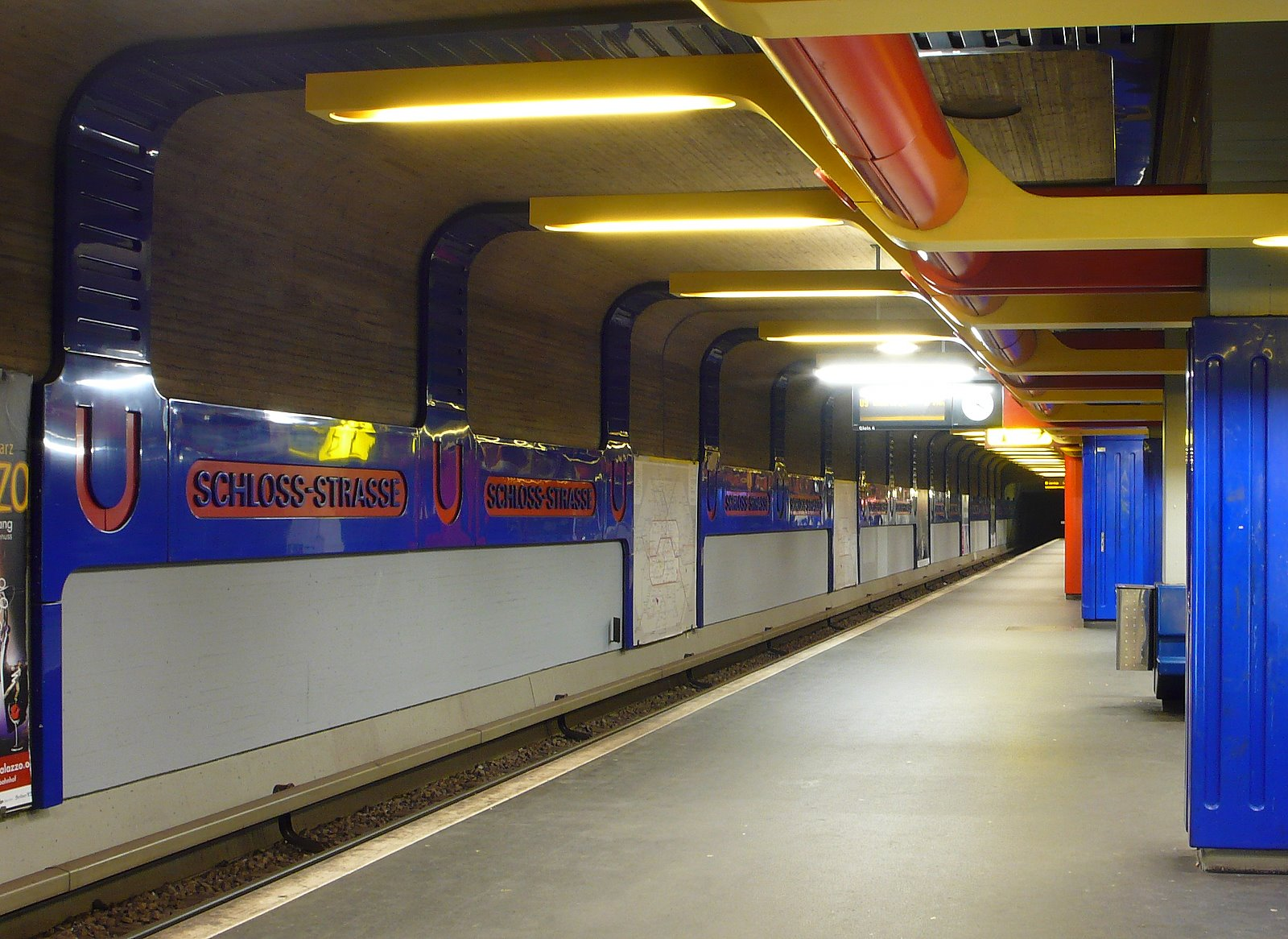
Platform view

Schloßstraße is a Berlin U-Bahn station located on the U9.

With its visible concrete walls partially covered by dark blue, orange and yellow plastic panels, Schloßstraße is an example of the 1970s pop-art design. Opened in 1974 by Schüler/Witte, it was planned to be a transfer station between U9 and the to-be-built U10. However, there is no current plan to establish the U10.

Preceding station	Berlin U-Bahn	Following station
Rathaus Steglitz Terminus	U9	Walther-Schreiber-Platz towards Osloer Straße
