= Johanna Elberskirchen =

German writer (1864–1943)

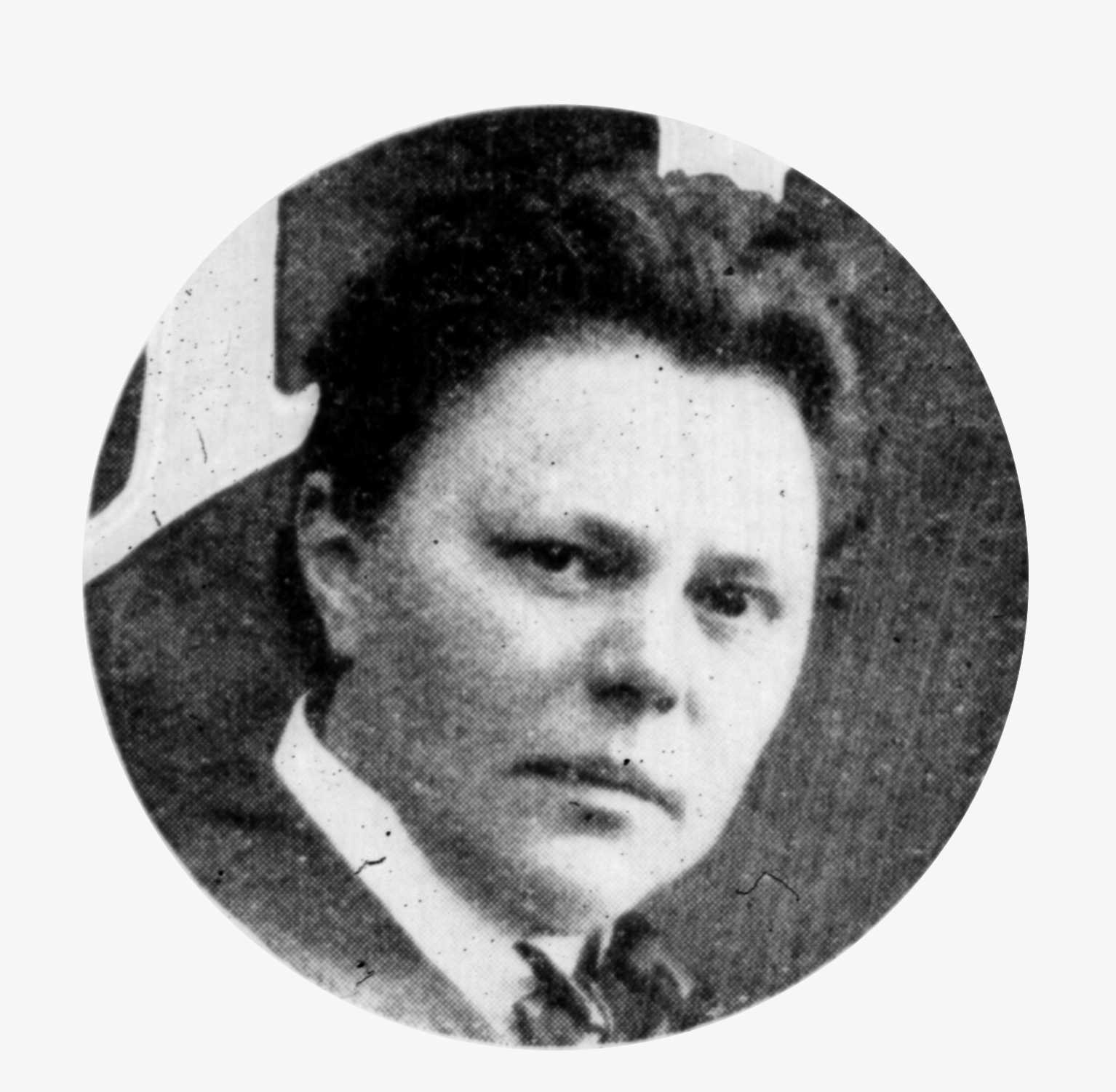
- Elberskirchen c. 1905
- Born: 11 April 1864; Bonn
- Died: May 17, 1943 (aged 79); Rüdersdorf
- Resting place: Grave of Hildegard Moniac (secretly)
- Occupations: Feminist writer, Activist
- Partner: Hildegard Moniac
- Writing career
- Language: German
- Years active: Late 19th - Early 20th Century
- Genres: Non-fiction, Feminist literature
- Subjects: Women's rights, LGBTQ+ rights, Workers' rights, Sexuality, Health
- Notable works: (Several books on women's sexuality and health)
- Literary movement: Women's movement, Early LGBTQ+ rights movement

Johanna Elberskirchen (11 April 1864 – 17 May 1943) was a German feminist writer and activist for the rights of women, gays and lesbians as well as blue-collar workers. She published books on women's sexuality and health among other topics. Her last known public appearance was in 1930 in Vienna, where she gave a talk at a conference organised by the World League for Sexual Reform. She was open about her own homosexuality which made her a somewhat exceptional figure in the feminist movement of her time. Her career as an activist was ended in 1933, when the Nazi Party rose to power. There is no public record of a funeral but witnesses report that Elberskirchen's urn was secretly put into the grave of Hildegard Moniac, who had been her life partner.

== Quotes ==
Based on the assumption that women's libido only exists in order to secure the creation of offspring and is therefore fundamentally different from men's libido, Elberskirchen argued that: "If it was the yearning for a child, there would be no abortion, no infanticide, no suicide. In that case the awful punitive articles wouldn't exist. And first and foremost the outrageous, immoral contempt of an unmarried mother and her child wouldn't exist - there would be no 'fallen' women, no 'bastards'.

== Publications ==
- Die Prostitution des Mannes. Auch eine Bergpredigt – Auch eine Frauenlektüre. In: Verlags-Magazin. J. Schabelitz, Zürich 1896.
- Socialdemokratie und sexuelle Anarchie. In: Verlags-Magazin. J. Schabelitz, Zürich 1897. (online)
- Das Weib, die Klerikalen und die Christlichsocialen. Schabelitz, Zürich 1898.
- Feminismus und Wissenschaft. 2. Auflage. Magazin-Verlag, Leipzig/ Rednitz 1903.
- Die Liebe des dritten Geschlechts. Homosexualität, eine bisexuelle Varietät keine Entartung – keine Schuld. Verlag von Max Spohr, Leipzig 1904. (online)
- Die da am Manne leiden … IV. Stück. Παντα ρει. 3. Auflage. Magazin-Verlag, Berlin um 1905.
- Was hat der Mann aus Weib, Kind und sich gemacht? Revolution und Erlösung des Weibes. Eine Abrechnung mit dem Mann – Ein Wegweiser in die Zukunft! 3. Auflage. Magazin-Verlag, um 1904.
- Geschlechtsleben und Geschlechtsenthaltsamkeit des Weibes. Seitz u. Schauer, München 1905. (online)
- Die Mutterschaft in ihrer Bedeutung für die national-soziale Wohlfahrt. Seitz u. Schauer, München 1905.
- Mutter, Seitz & Schauer, München 1905.
  - 1: Schutz der Mutter. (online)
  - 2: Geschlechtliche Aufklärung des Weibes. (online)
- with Max Below: Kinderheil. Zeitschrift für Mütter zur leiblichen und geistigen Gesundung und Gesunderhaltung der Kinder. Seitz & Schauer, München 1905–1907.
- with Anna Eysoldt: Die Mutter als Kinderärztin. Seitz u. Schauer, München 1907.

== Sources ==
- Krettmann, Ulrike: Johanna Elberskirchen. In: Lautmann, Rüdiger (Hrsg.): Homosexualität. Handbuch zur Theorie- und Forschungsgeschichte. Frankfurt/M./New York 1993.
- Christiane Leidinger: Keine Tochter aus gutem Hause – Johanna Elberskirchen (1864–1943). UVK, Konstanz 2008.
- Leng, Kirsten (Fall 2013). "Sex, science, and fin-de-siècle feminism: Johanna Elberskirchen interprets The Laws of Life". Journal of Women's History. 25 (3): 38–61. doi:10.1353/jowh.2013.0034. S2CID 143542936.
