= III. Städtischer Friedhof Stubenrauchstraße =

Cemetery in Berlin, Germany

Coordinates: 52°28′35″N 13°19′22″E

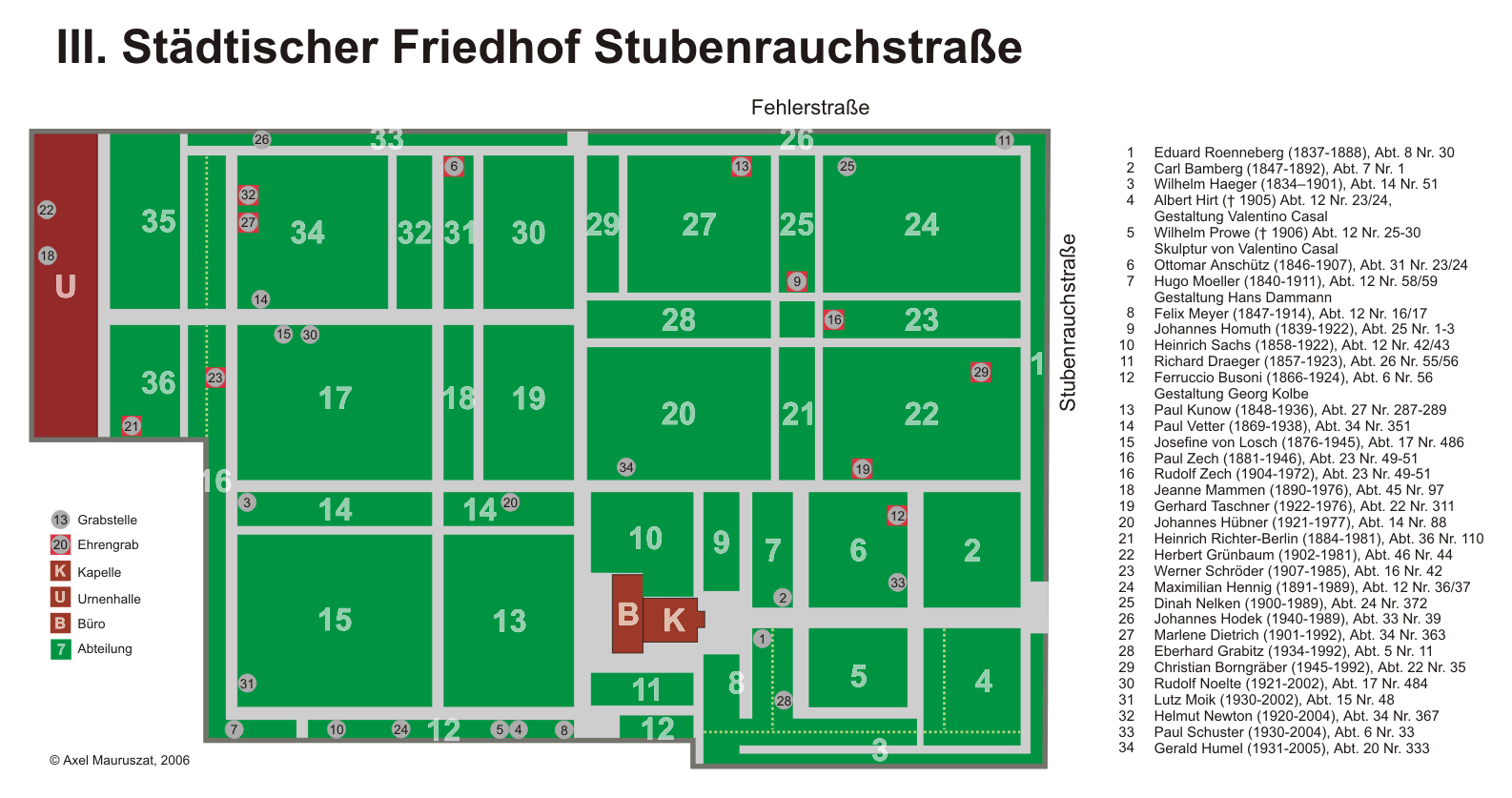
Map of the cemetery with marks of famous graves

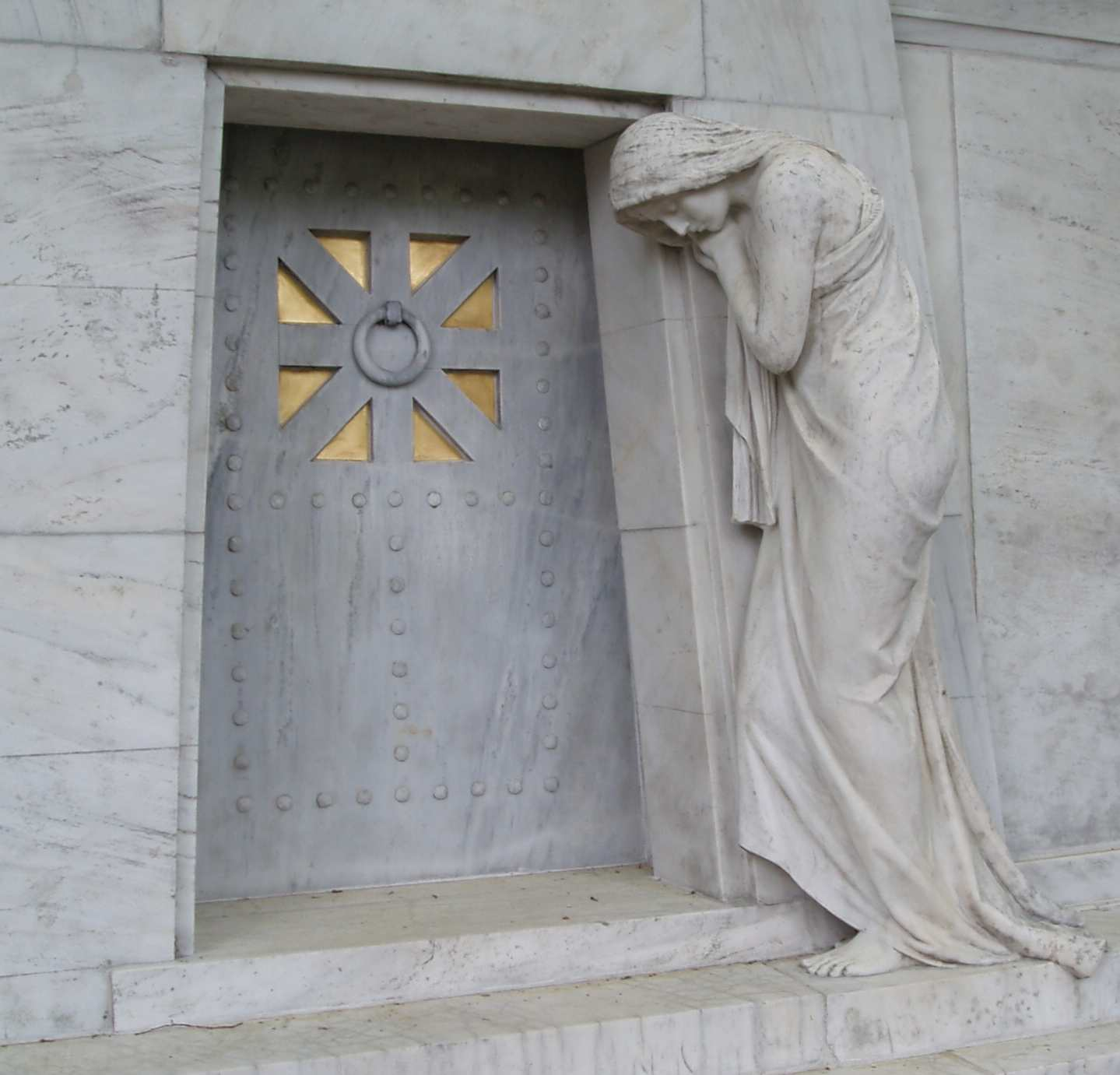
Family Prowe, gravedetail, said to be the best work of sculptor Valentino Casal (1908)

Städtischer Friedhof III is a cemetery in the Friedenau district of the borough of Tempelhof-Schöneberg in Berlin, Germany. Buried here are Ferruccio Busoni (1866–1924), Marlene Dietrich (1901–1992) and Helmut Newton (1920–2004).
