= Hildegard Moniac =

German educator and activist (1891–1967)

- Born: 29 March 1891; Friedenau, Tempelhof-Schöneberg, Berlin, German Empire
- Died: 3 August 1967 (aged 76); Rüdersdorf, Brandenburg, Germany
- Education: Lette-Verein
- Political party: Independent Social Democratic Party of Germany
- Partner: Johanna Elberskirchen (d. 1943)

Hildegard Helene Friederike Moniac (29 March 1891 – 3 August 1967) was a German educator and political activist.

== Biography ==
Moniac was born on 29 March 1891 in Friedenau, Tempelhof-Schöneberg, Berlin. She was raised in Berlin and graduated from the Lette-Verein as a vocational school teacher for tailoring and millinery in 1911.

From 1913 to 1933, Moniac worked as a vocational high school teacher in Spremberg. From 1920, Moniac lived with her partner Johanna Elberskirchen (1864–1943) and Elberskirchen's two sisters. The couple had met in 1914.

Moniac was a member of the Independent Social Democratic Party of Germany (USPD) and she may also have been a member of the Communist Party of Germany (KPD) in the late 1920s. She was an active political activist. In 1933, Moniac was forcibly dismissed from her teaching position under Section 4 of the Law for the Restoration of the Professional Civil Service (BBG, German: Gesetz zur Wiederherstellung des Berufsbeamtentums, shortened to Berufsbeamtengesetz), which had been established by the incoming Nazi regime, as a "politically unreliable person."

After her dismissal from teaching, Moniac supported her partner Elberskirchen in running a homeopathic practice in Rüdersdorf, Brandenburg. In Rüdersdof, it was known that the women were lesbian opponents of the Nazis. Elberskirchen was also a feminist writer who published books on women's sexuality and health. Elberskirchen died on 17 May 1943 and Moniac was subsequently involved in an inheritance dispute with Elberskirchen's family.

At the end of World War II, the Soviet Red Army occupied the elementary school Alt-Rüdersdorf. The school reopened on 15 October 1945 with Moniac as director. In 1951 she was transferred to another school following protests from parents about her politics (and possibly also her sexuality). She retired in 1954.

Moniac lived with her partner Luitgarde Kettner (1914–1977), who also taught at Alt-Rüdersdorf, until her death. She died on 3 August 1967, aged 76, and was buried at Friedhof Rudolf-Breitscheid-Straße cemetery in Rüdersdorf [de]. Her property was inherited by Kettner.

In 1975, Johanna Elberkirchen's urn was secretly reinterred at Moniac's burial site by friends and the grave was planted with forget-me-nots and violets. On 5 November 2002, the municipal council of Rüdersdorf placed the grave of Moniac and Elberkirchen under protection and a commemorative monument was unveiled in 2003.
