= Leopoldplatz station =

Station of the Berlin U-Bahn

Coordinates: 52°32′48″N 13°21′33″E

Leopoldplatz
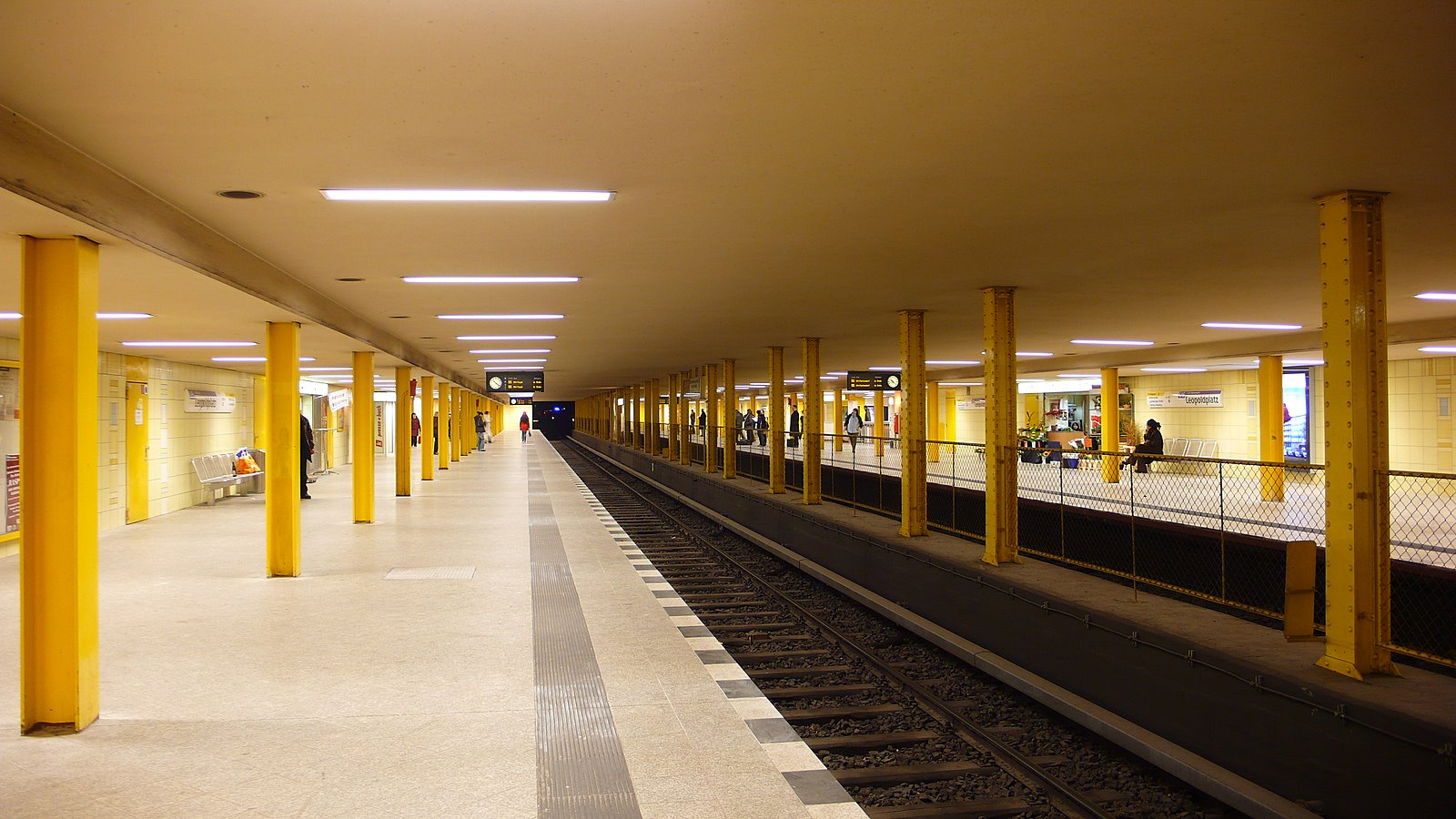
- U-Bahn station Leopoldplatz

General information
- Location: Wedding
- Owner: Berliner Verkehrsbetriebe
- Operator: Berliner Verkehrsbetriebe
- Line: U6 U9
- Platforms: 2 side platforms and 1 island platform
- Tracks: 4

Construction
- Structure type: Underground

History
- Opened: 8 March 1923; 103 years ago

Services
Preceding station	Berlin U-Bahn	Following station
Seestraße towards Alt-Tegel	U6	Wedding towards Alt-Mariendorf
Amrumer Straße towards Rathaus Steglitz	U9	Nauener Platz towards Osloer Straße

Leopoldplatz is a Berlin U-Bahn station in the Wedding district which serves as an interchange between the lines U6 and U9. It is operated by the BVG.

== Overview ==
Leopoldplatz station first opened on 8 March 1923, along with the rest of the newly built line between the stations Stettiner Bahnhof (now Naturkundemuseum) and Seestraße, now part of the U6 line. Only much later on 28 August 1961 did the second, deeper platform open to serve what is now the U9 line. The building of this new platform involved a complete reconstruction of the older U6 platform, which was transformed from having a single island platform to having two platforms flanking the tracks. This was done in order to facilitate an easier transfer between the two lines served, and makes it one of very few stations on the U6 line to have such a layout.

Until 1 September 1964, Leopoldplatz was served by several tram lines. The tracks have since been removed but Leopoldplatz remains a transport hub, served by five bus lines during the day and three lines at night.

A small convenience store and cafe are located within the station.
