= U9 (Berlin U-Bahn) =

Railway line in Berlin, Germany

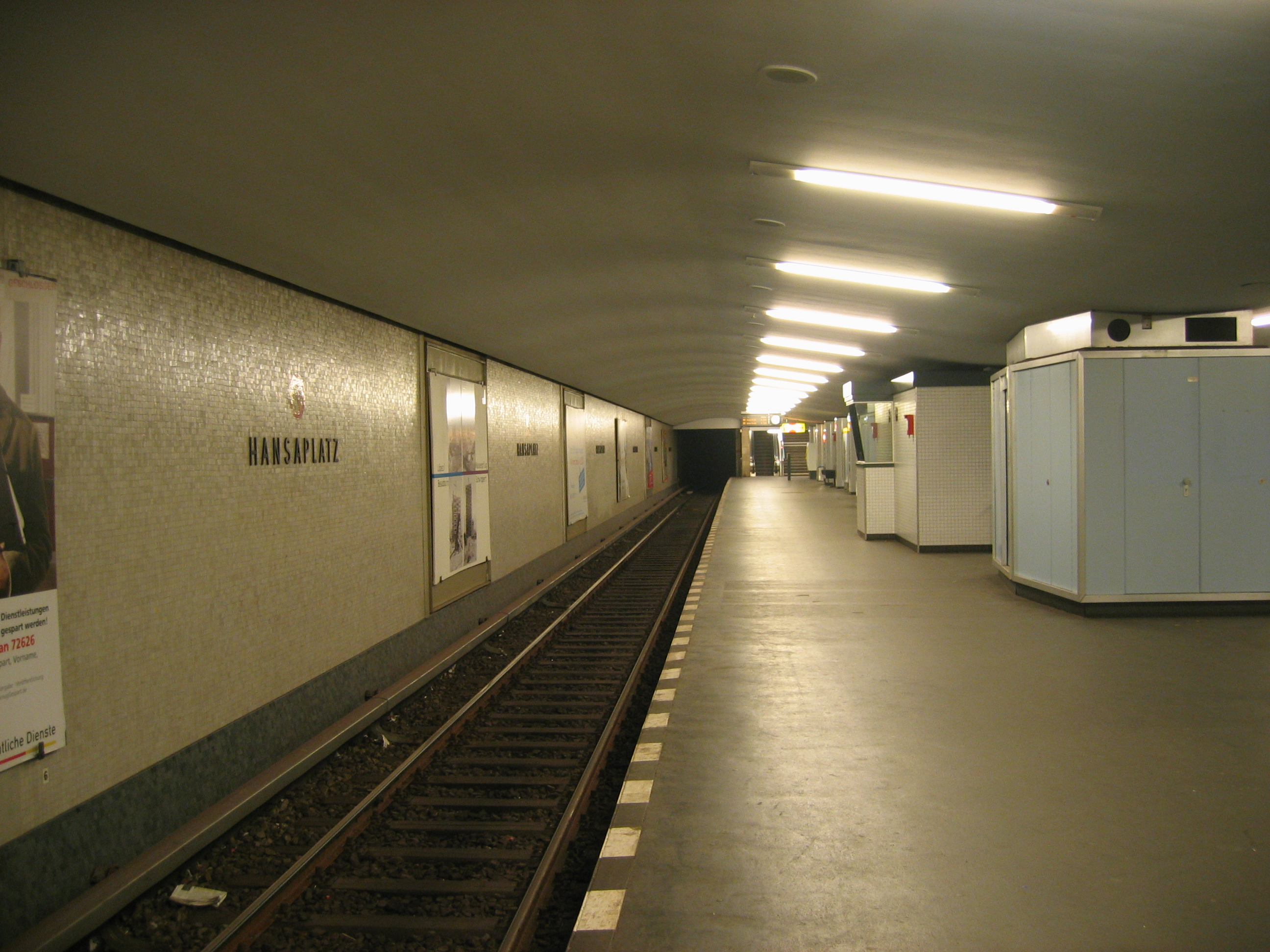
- Hansaplatz, one of the stations of the U9

Overview
- Locale: Berlin
- Termini: Osloer Straße; Rathaus Steglitz
- Stations: 18

Service
- Type: Rapid transit
- System: Berlin U-Bahn
- Operator: Berliner Verkehrsbetriebe
- Depot: Britz
- Rolling stock: F74/76/79; H

History
- Opened: 28 August 1961; 65 years ago (Note: From Leopoldplatz to Spichernstraße)
- Last extension: 30 April 1976 (Note: From Leopoldplatz to Osloer Straße)

Technical
- Line length: 12.5 km (7.8 mi)
- Track gauge: 1,435 mm (4 ft 8 1/2 in) standard gauge
- Loading gauge: Großprofil
- Electrification: 750 V DC third rail (bottom running)
Route map
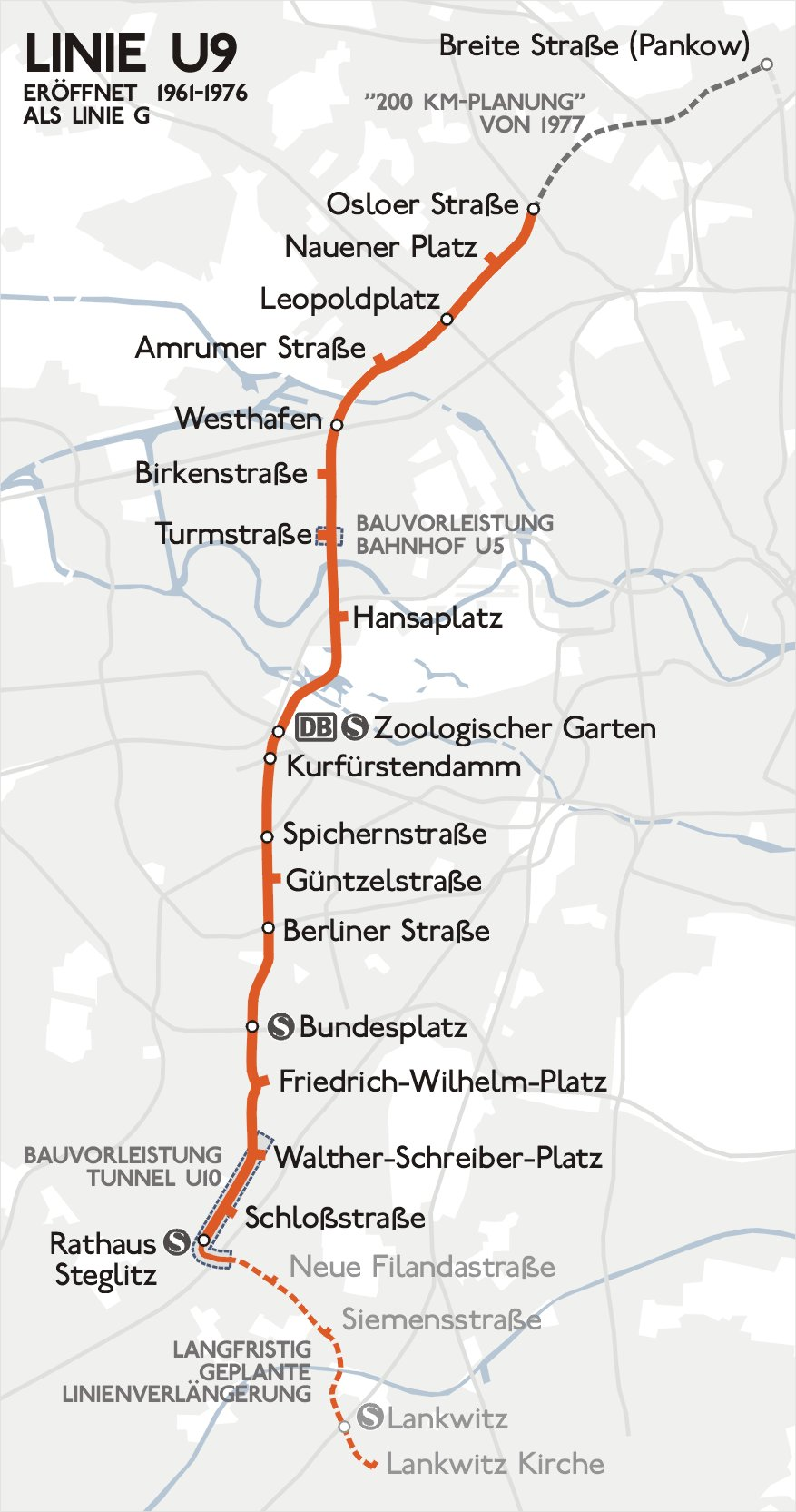

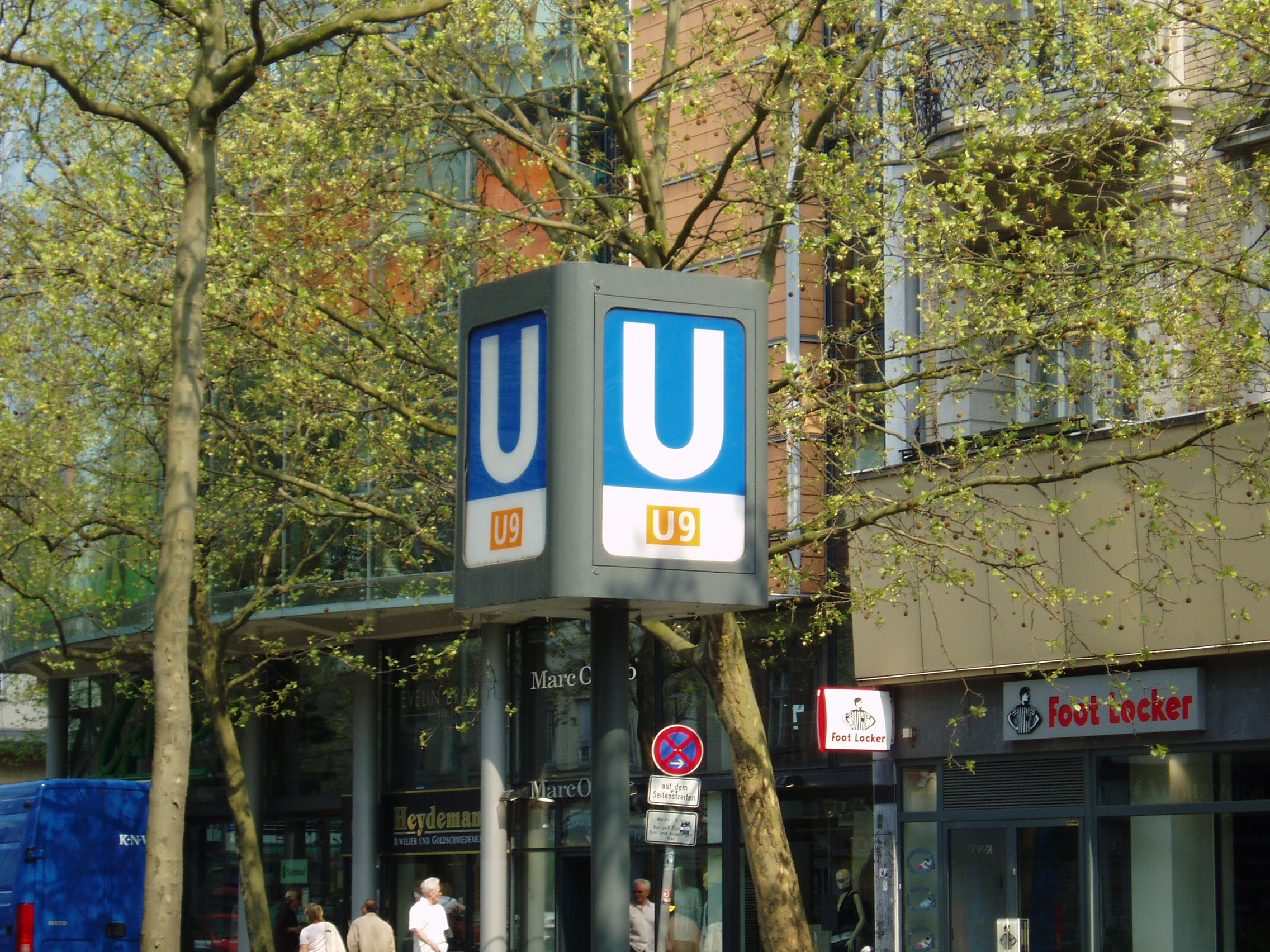
U9

U9 is a line on the Berlin U-Bahn. The line was opened on 28 August 1961 as Line G. It is a crucial north-south underground transit connecting Osloer Straße in the north and Rathaus Steglitz in the south. It traverses 18 stations, passing through key areas like Tiergarten, Zoologischer Garten (Zoo) and Kurfürstendamm.

It runs completely underground with 12.5 km running from Osloer Straße to Rathaus Steglitz.

== Route ==
The path of the U9 is completely underground. It starts in the north at Osloer Straße in Gesundbrunnen and runs through Wedding before passing under the Berlin Ringbahn and running through Moabit, reaching Hansaplatz and Tiergarten before crossing the Berlin Stadtbahn at the Zoo and Kurfürstendamm, eventually leaving western central Berlin by heading to Friedenau and finally Steglitz at Rathaus Steglitz.

== History ==
=== First stage of construction ===
After the division of Berlin in 1948, the citizens of West Berlin preferred buses and trams that bypassed East Berlin. Furthermore, the highly populated boroughs of Steglitz, Wedding and Reinickendorf were in need of rapid transit access to the new center of West Berlin south of the Zoo. This prompted the construction of a completely new line, then called line G, becoming the third north–south line after line C (modern U6) and line D (modern U8).

Groundbreaking took place on 23 June 1955 at Tiergarten. Construction was difficult as it needed to pass under four U-Bahn lines (U1, U2, U3, U6), two S-Bahn lines (Stadtbahn, Ringbahn twice) and three waterways (Spree River, Landwehr Canal, Berlin-Spandau Canal).

Line G from Leopoldplatz to Spichernstraße was planned to open on 2 September 1961. This was pushed up to 28 August 1961 after the construction of the Berlin Wall underscored the necessity of this new line. To accommodate the U9, the Nürnberger Platz station was closed. It was replaced by Spichernstraße (opened 2 June 1959) and Augsburger Straße (opened 8 May 1961) stations respectively.

The new stations include:

- Leopoldplatz (today: U6)
- Amrumer Straße
- Putlitzstraße (today: Westhafen; S-Bahn /Ringbahn)
- Birkenstraße
- Turmstraße
- Hansaplatz
- Zoologischer Garten (heute: U2; S-Bahn /Stadtbahn)
- Kurfürstendamm (today: U1)
- Spichernstraße (today: U3)

It will also interchange with the smaller profile station, but it was opened on the same day as U9 was opened:

- Kurfürstendamm

=== Second Stage ===
==== Background ====
In the early 1960s, West Berlin experienced significant population growth and faced political isolation following the construction of the Berlin Wall in 1961. The Wall disrupted transportation between East and West Berlin, making it essential to enhance the internal U-Bahn network. To improve connectivity and reduce reliance on buses, which were slower and less efficient, West Berlin planned an extensive U-Bahn expansion. This project was funded by subsidies from the Federal Republic of Germany (West Germany), supporting West Berlin during its period of isolation.

==== Groundbreaking ====
Groundbreaking for the second stage of the Berlin U-Bahn began on 1 July 1962. This phase aimed to increase the network's capacity, alleviate congestion of both passengers and trains on existing lines, and provide faster connections to previously underserved areas. At the time, it was the longest U-Bahn extension in Berlin's history, encompassing nine kilometers of track and eleven new stations.

==== Construction and Route Description ====
The expansion focused on two major lines entirely within West Berlin:

- U7 Extension: The U7 line was extended westward from Möckernbrücke to Fehrbelliner Platz, serving neighborhoods like Wilmersdorf. This extension enhanced access to Berlin's western center and addressed areas that lacked efficient public transit.

- U9 Extension: The U9 line was extended southward from Spichernstraße to Walther-Schreiber-Platz along Bundesallee, serving Wilmersdorf and Schöneberg. The U9 crosses the U7 at Berliner Straße station, where the U9 runs deeper underground than the U7 to accommodate the intersection.

These expansions significantly covered a large portion of West Berlin, improving overall connectivity without extending into East Berlin.

==== Extension Completion and Impact ====
Completed on 29 January 1971, the new expansion provided Steglitz and Neukölln with rapid connections to the western center, replacing slower buses that were hindered by traffic congestion. The Berlin Wall's continued presence made internal connectivity crucial, promoting economic growth and improving the quality of life for residents. This extension remains one of the longest in U-Bahn history.

==== Platform Design and Road Tunnels ====
During construction, infrastructure challenges were addressed through innovative platform designs:

- Berliner Straße Station: A road tunnel was built beneath Bundesallee, necessitating an unconventional central platform. Here, U9 trains approach from the left, mimicking side platforms with a single passageway at the north end connecting both sections.

- Bundesplatz Station: A road tunnel under Bundesplatz prevented the construction of a central platform. Instead, tracks split before the station, creating two side platforms.

Both road tunnels and associated U-Bahn stations were constructed by West Berlin authorities as part of urban development projects.

==== Architectural Design ====
All stations in this extension were designed by Rainer G. Rümmler. Departing from traditional ceramic tiles, Rümmler employed large, colorful fiber cement panels. The color schemes were chosen to evoke specific associations:

- Berliner Straße Station: Features white and red panels reflecting Berlin's coat of arms. - Eisenacher Straße Station: Showcases green panels inspired by the Thuringian Forest near Eisenach.

Rümmler's bold color choices made him a controversial yet influential architect in the history of Berlin's U-Bahn.

=== Final extension ===
Between Walther-Schreiber-Platz station and the Schloßstraße the U9 changes to the tunnel section of U10. In Schloßstraße station itself, the tracks are heading north on the top, in the direction of Rathaus Steglitz on the lower level, however, the offices on the eastern edge of the platform on which was supposed to take the U10. The western edge of the platform is separated by a fence from the passenger traffic. In track trough, unused tracks are laid without power rail. To date, there hangs the sign "No trains". By these enormous constructed provisions, the cost of one meter underground route exorbitantly to 78,000 Mark (adjusted for purchasing power in today's money).

Behind the Schloßstraße ends the U9 at the Rathaus Steglitz. The paths of U9 and U10 here separate again. Both lines should keep in Steglitz at separate stations, viewed from Schloßstraße from an end opening "V" would form. The intended actually for the U9 station Part (Rzo) is equipped with side platforms, located in the minus-1 level until now has been completed only in the shell and is cut off as a storeroom for the civil protection used. The original platform is operated for the U9 instead of planned for the U10 Station part (Rzu) in the minus-2 level.

The background for this management decision lies at the intersection of the planned U9-line and Wannseebahn immediately south of the station. In the 1970s, negotiations with the Deutsche Reichsbahn regarding the railway line to Steglitz station proved unsuccessful. Consequently, the BVG did not create the necessary sweeping system behind the station. Unlike the west-extending U10, the U9 faced challenges, leading it to be routed along the U10 with a reversing facility. In January 1984, when the operation shifted to BVG, an opportunity arose to pass under the S-Bahn without reopening negotiations with the Reichsbahn. With this assurance, the functionless tunnel was extended beneath the railway embankment in the mid-1980s. However, a reversing facility, or at least a part of it, was not incorporated into this section, with plans to address this in a subsequent part of the tunnel.

The section to Rathaus Stegliz was definitely opened on 30 September 1974, its construction began on 7 July 1969.

The addition is from Leopoldplatz to Osloer Straße. It was opened on 30 April 1976, construction began on 6 November 1969. Since this was not feasible but due to the political situation, they let the U9 only to cross Osloer Straße/Swedener Straße construct. They were provided for two new stations: Nauener Platz, Turmstraße, and Osloer Straße. Until then, the U8 can be extended. This resulted in the situation that this tower station could be built without regard to existing underground services. It has also helped build a spacious, bright basement distribution, in which there are several shops and snack bars.

== Planned extensions ==
The route was suggested to go via Holzstraße, Wollankstraße and will be divided into two options:

- Going to Pankow Kirche, it will be via Rathaus Pankow, Pankow Kirche, Hadlichestraße and towards Quartier am Pankower Tor
- Going to Pankow, it will be via Florapromenade, Pankow, Neumannstraße and towards Quartier am Pankower Tor

All planned extensions were abandoned due to low patronage.
