= Berlin Rathaus Steglitz station =

Railway station in Berlin, Germany

Coordinates: 52.456°N 13.321°E

Rathaus Steglitz
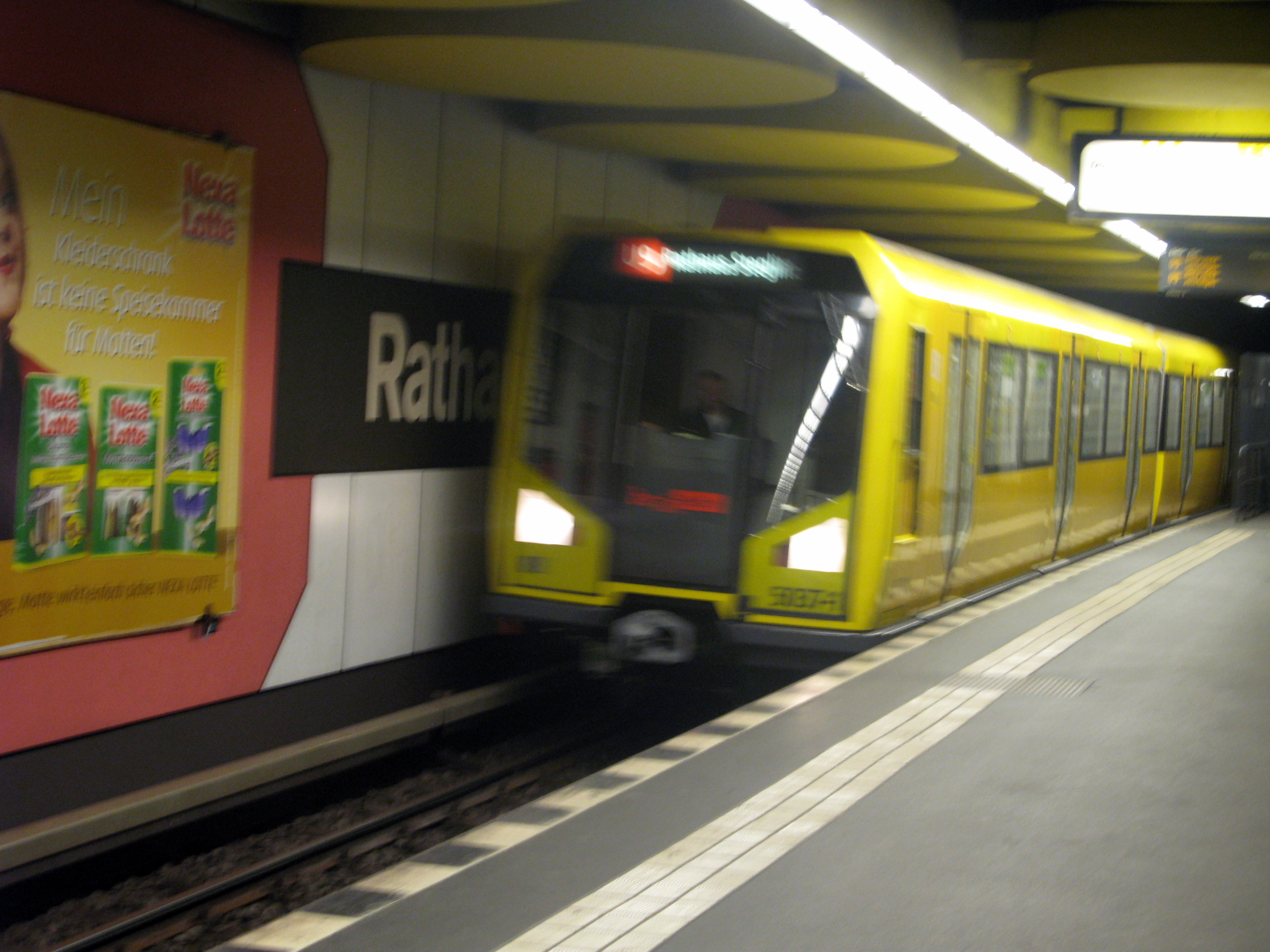
- U-Bahn platforms

General information
- Location: Steglitz-Zehlendorf, Berlin, Berlin; Germany
- Lines: Wannsee Railway

Other information
- Station code: 5129
- DS100 code: BRST
- Category: 4
- Fare zone: VBB: Berlin B/5656

Services
Preceding station	Berlin S-Bahn	Following station
Feuerbachstraße towards Oranienburg	S1	Botanischer Garten towards Wannsee
Preceding station	Berlin U-Bahn	Following station
Terminus	U9	Schloßstraße towards Osloer Straße
Location

Berlin Rathaus Steglitz (in German Bahnhof Berlin Rathaus Steglitz, meaning Steglitz Town Hall Station) is the name of both a railway station on the Wannsee Railway and a U-Bahn station in the district of Steglitz in Berlin, Germany, which are close together. It is served by the Berlin S-Bahn, Berlin U-Bahn and numerous local bus lines.

The subway station was built in 1974 by R. G. Rümmler. A platform for the planned U10 subway line was built also; however, it is unlikely that it will be constructed (planned to Lankwitz).

== Gallery ==
=== S-Bahn ===
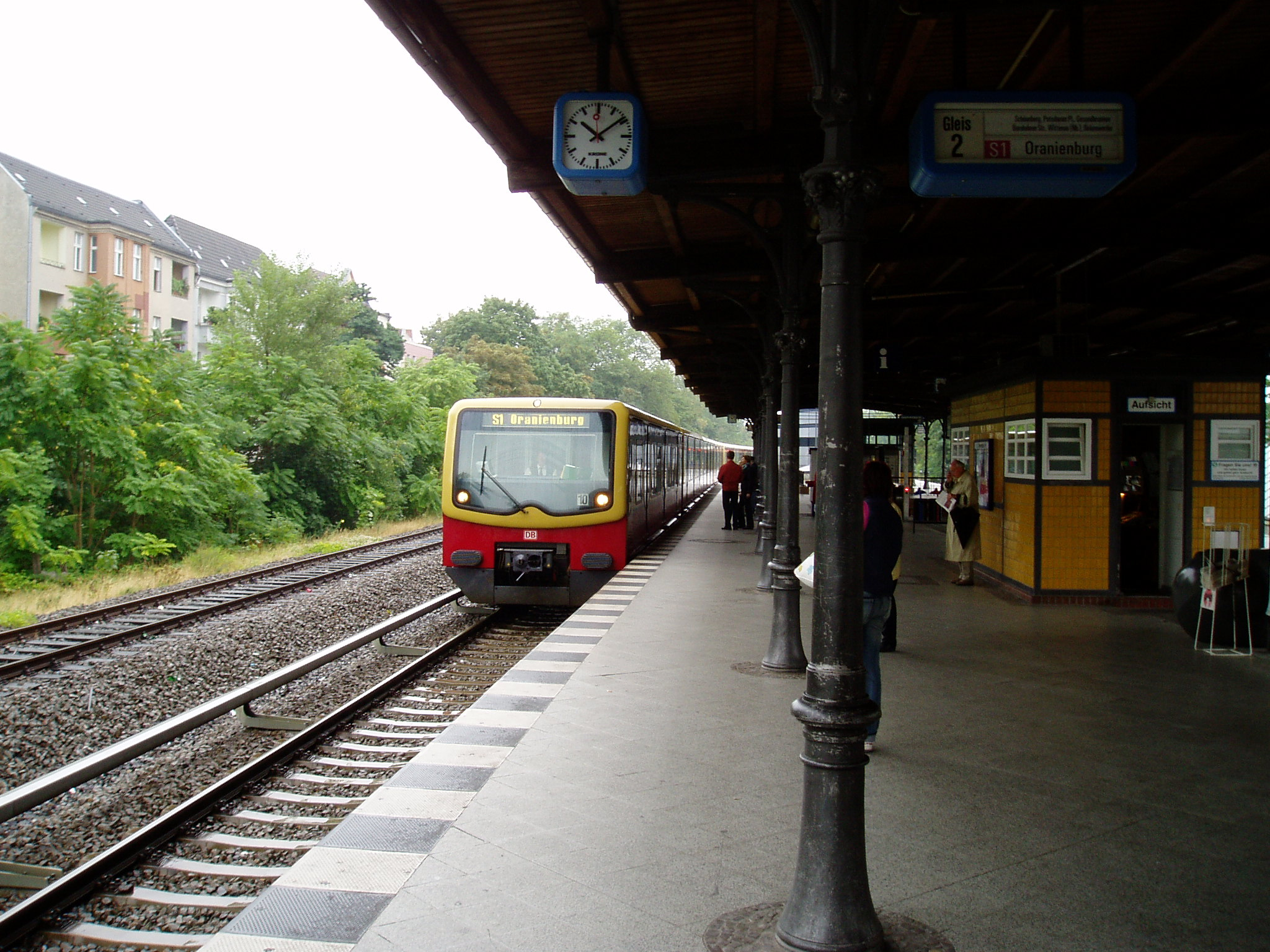
2006

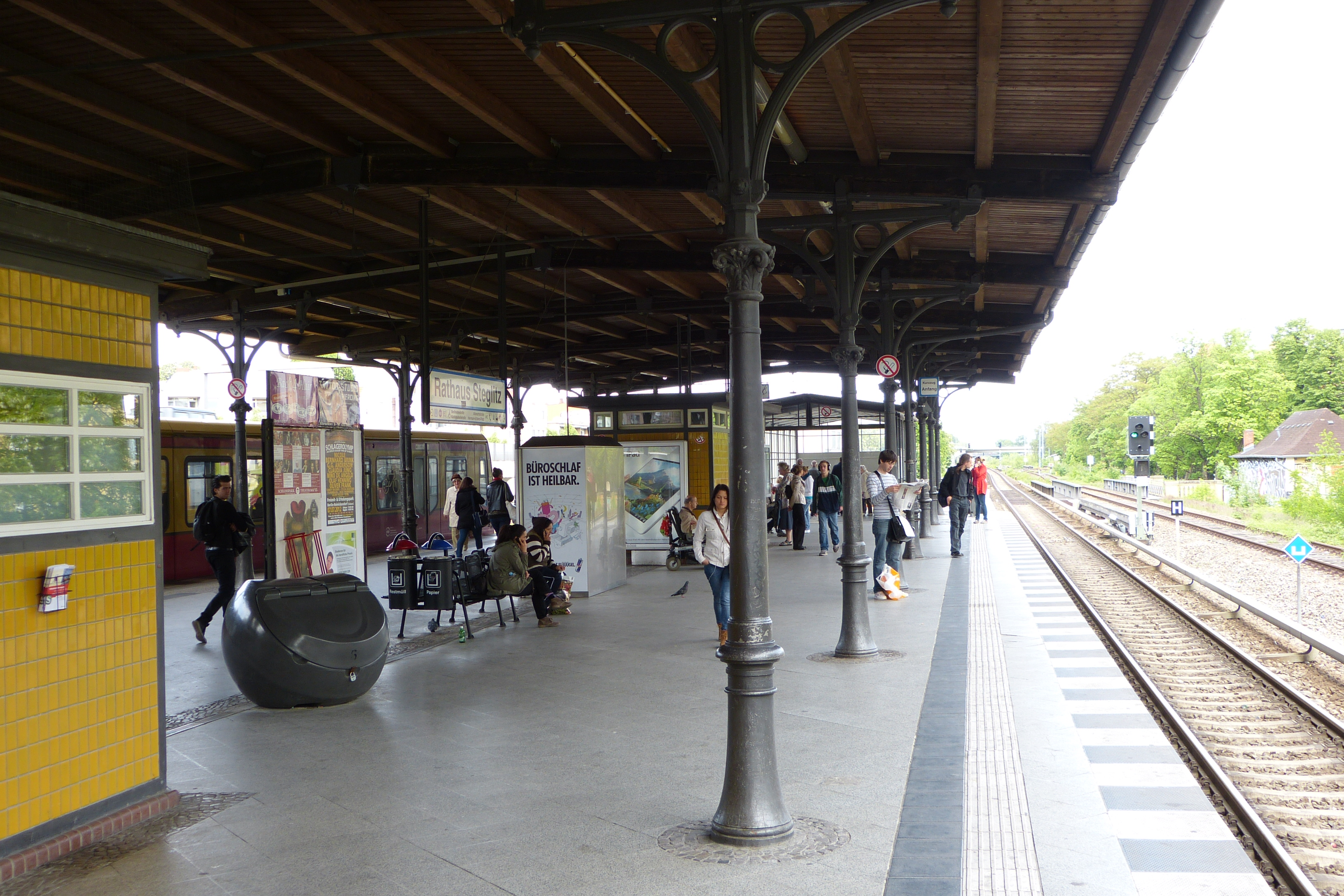
2012

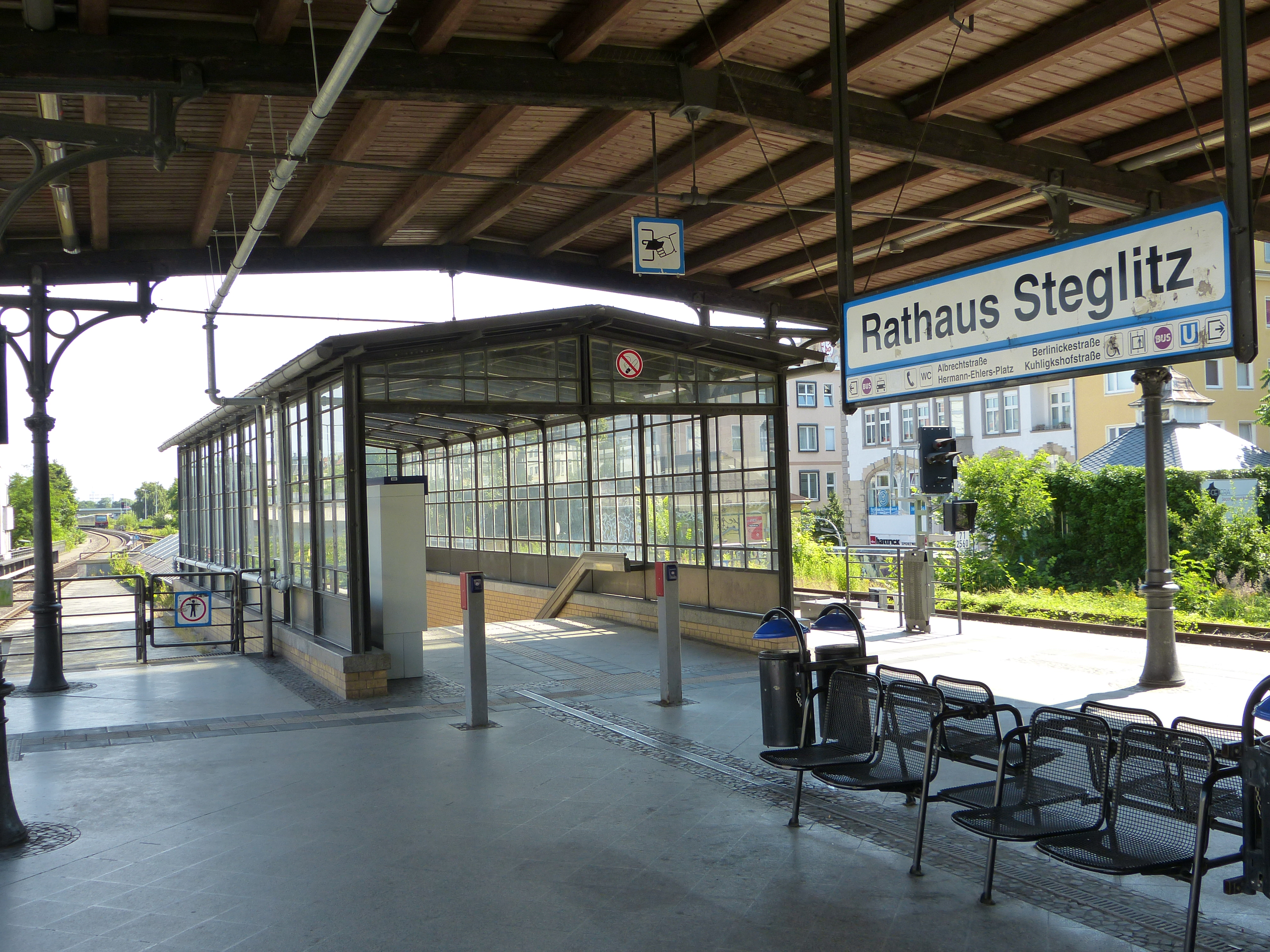
2013

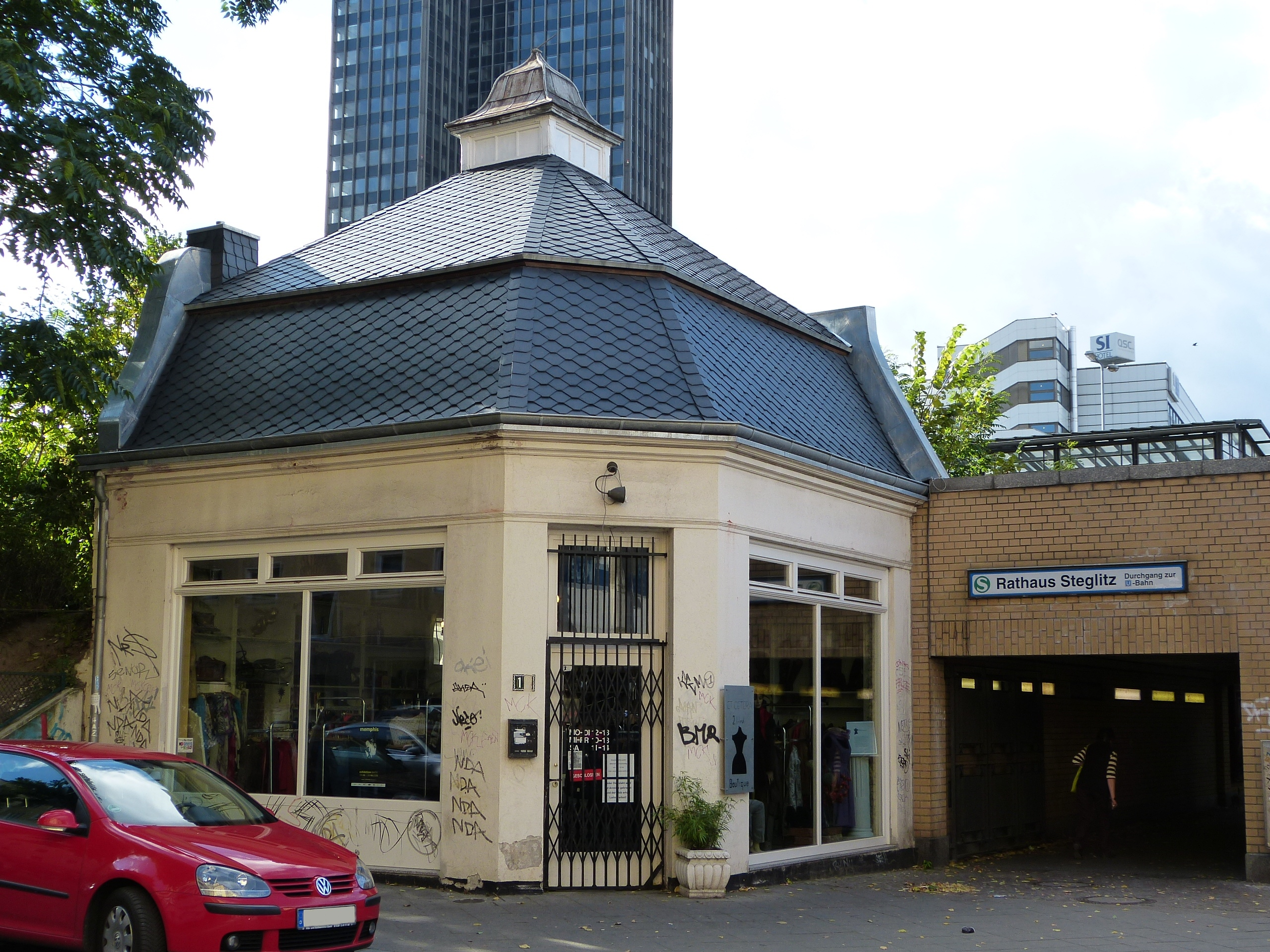
2012

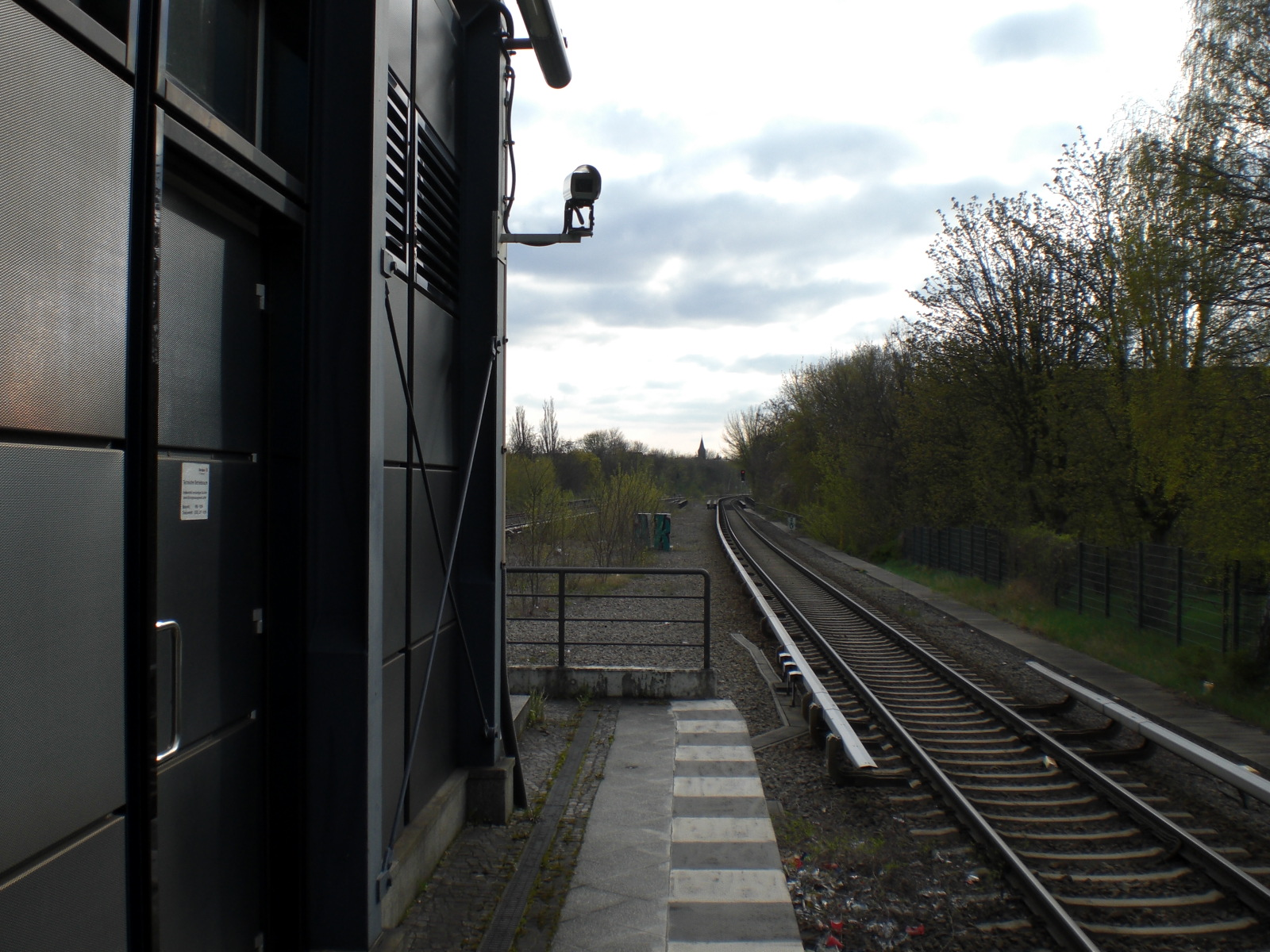
2008

=== U-Bahn ===
2021

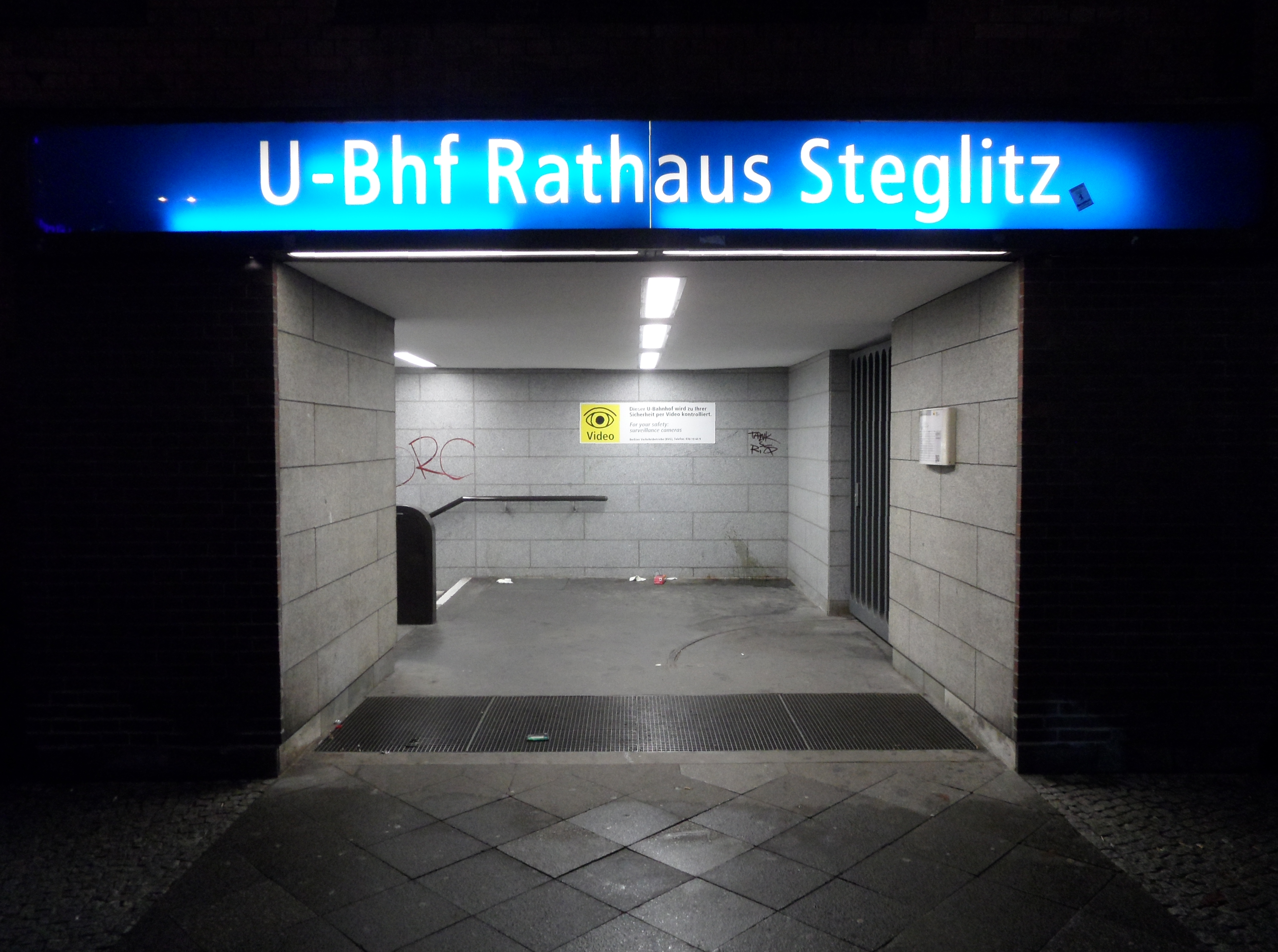
