= Osloer Straße station =

Station of the Berlin U-Bahn

Coordinates: 52°33′25″N 13°22′25″E

Platform sporting a Flag of Norway design

Osloer Straße is a Berlin U-Bahn station in the Gesundbrunnen (former Wedding) district, located on the U8 and U9. Like the eponymous street it is named after the City of Oslo.

The two-level station opened on 30 April 1976 (U9) and 5 October 1977 (U8). Since 1995 it has also been served by the M13 line and line 50 of the Berlin Straßenbahn. The architect was R. G. Rümmler. The station have had also a direct connection to Tegel Airport with the bus 128.

Preceding station	Berlin U-Bahn	Following station
Franz-Neumann-Platz towards Wittenau	U8	Pankstraße towards Hermannstraße
Nauener Platz towards Rathaus Steglitz	U9	Terminus
