= List of Berlin U-Bahn stations =

This is an alphabetical list of Berlin U-Bahn stations. Currently, there are 175 active stations.

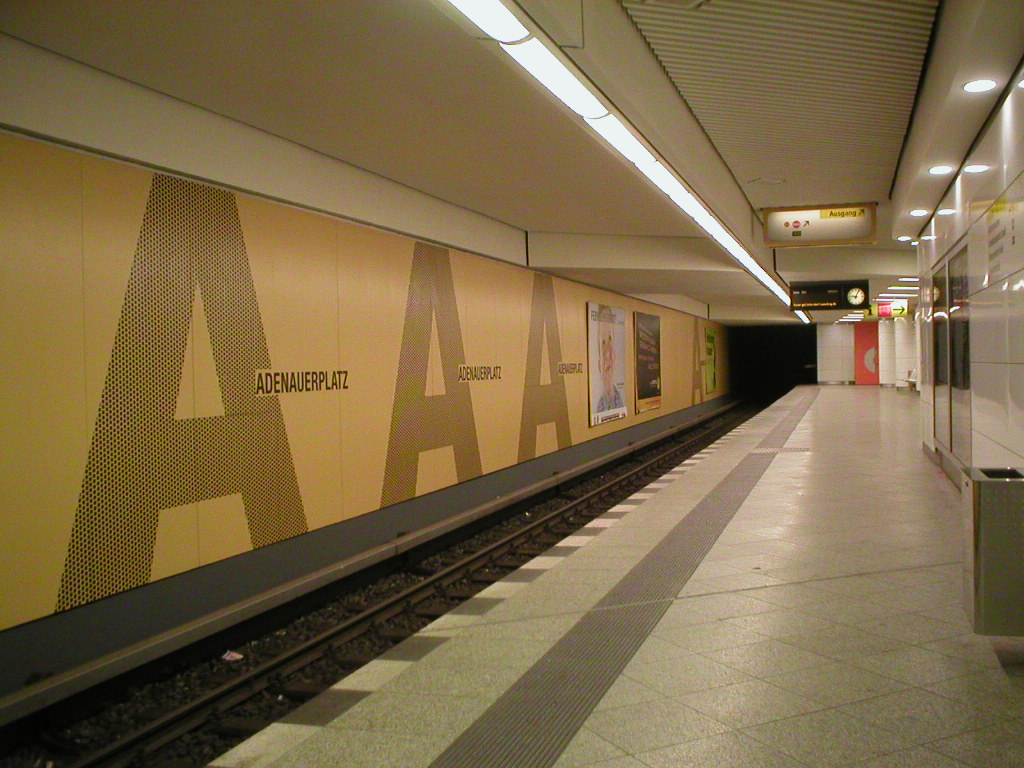
Adenauerplatz

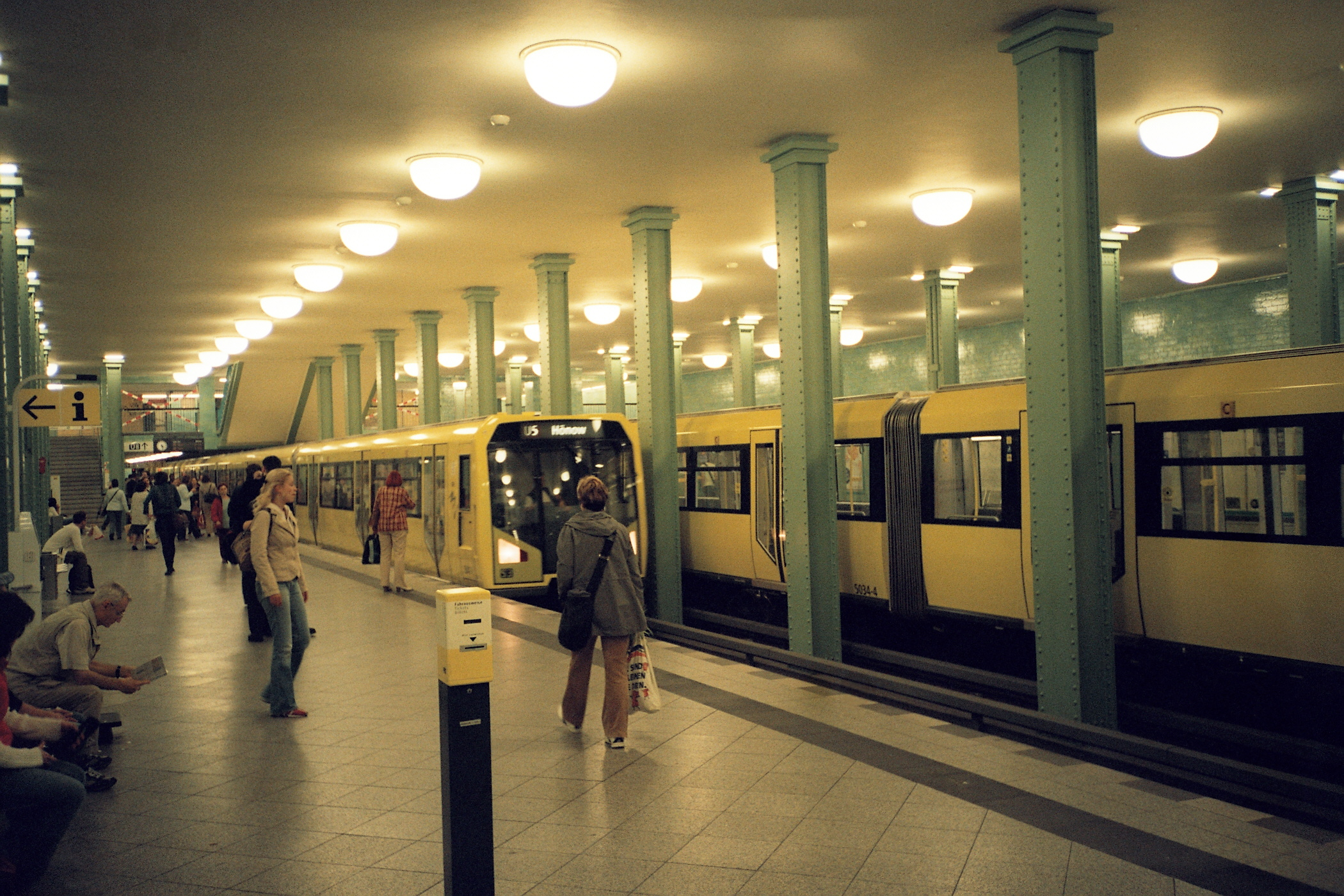
Alexanderplatz

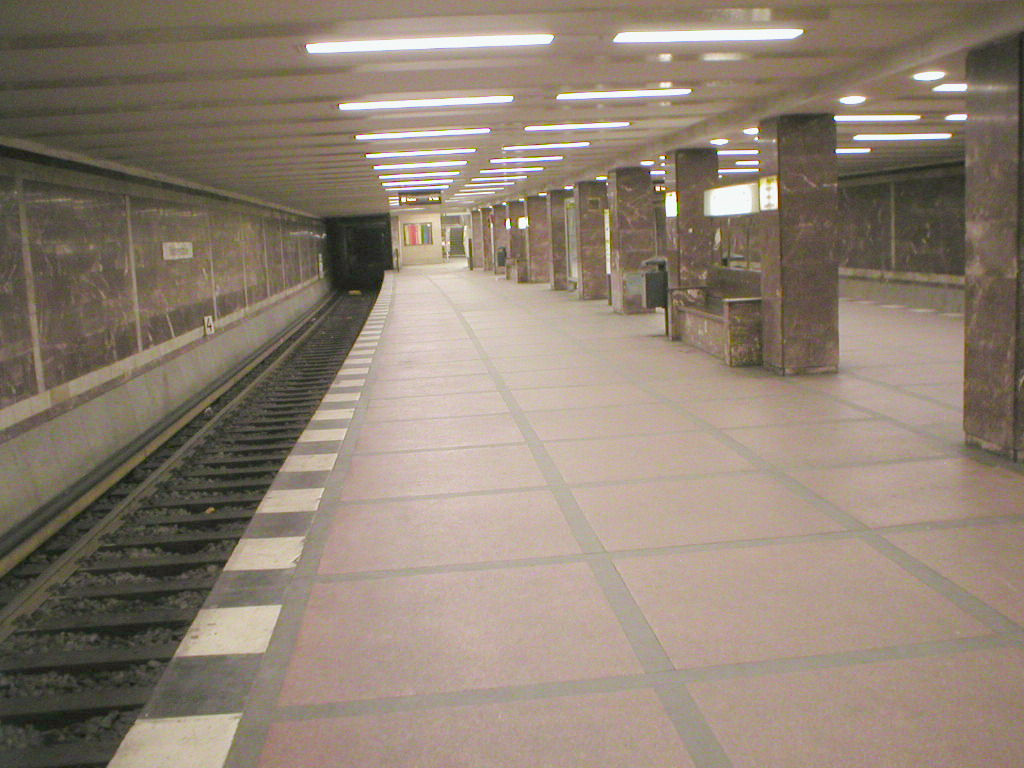
Anton-Wilhelm-Amo-Straße

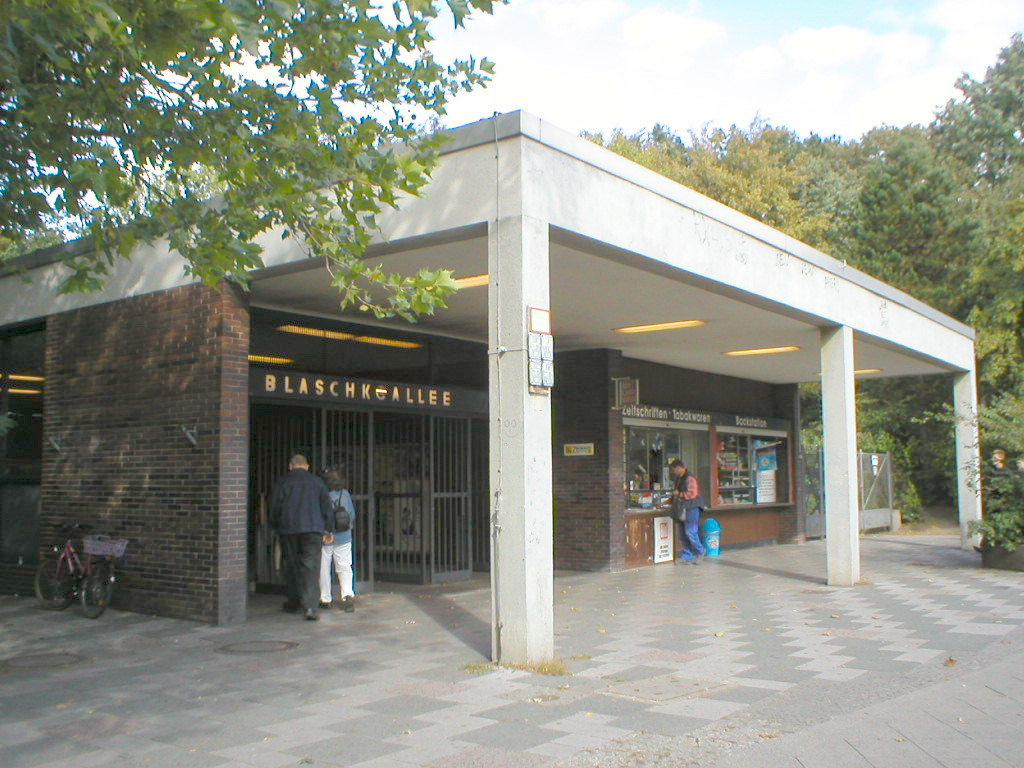
Blaschkoallee

== A ==
Station	Line	Opened	Situation
Adenauerplatz	U7	28 April 1978	underground
Afrikanische Straße	U6	3 May 1956	underground
Alexanderplatz	U2	1 July 1913	underground
Alexanderplatz	U5	21 December 1930	underground
Alexanderplatz	U8	18 April 1930	underground
Alt-Mariendorf	U6	28 February 1966	underground
Alt-Tegel	U6	29 May 1958	underground
Alt-Tempelhof	U6	28 February 1966	underground
Altstadt Spandau	U7	1 October 1984	underground
Amrumer Straße	U9	28 August 1961	underground
Anton-Wilhelm-Amo-Straße	U2	1 October 1908	underground
Augsburger Straße	U3	8 May 1961	underground

== B ==
Station	Line	Opened	Situation
Bayerischer Platz	U4	1 December 1910	underground
Bayerischer Platz	U7	19 January 1971	underground
Berliner Straße	U7	29 January 1971	underground
Berliner Straße	U9	29 January 1971	underground
Bernauer Straße	U8	18 April 1930	underground
Biesdorf-Süd	U5	1 July 1988	at grade
Birkenstraße	U9	28 January 1961	underground
Bismarckstraße	U2	28 April 1978	underground
Bismarckstraße	U7	28 April 1978	underground
Blaschkoallee	U7	28 September 1963	underground
Blissestraße	U7	29 January 1971	underground
Boddinstraße	U8	17 July 1927	underground
Borsigwerke	U6	31 May 1958	underground
Breitenbachplatz	U3	12 October 1913	underground
Brandenburger Tor	U5	8 August 2009	underground
Britz-Süd	U7	29 September 1963	underground
Bülowstraße	U2	11 March 1902	elevated
Bundestag	U5	8 August 2009	underground
Bundesplatz	U9	29 January 1971	underground

== C ==
Station	Line	Opened	Situation
Cottbusser Platz	U5	1 July 1989	at grade

== D ==
Station	Line	Opened	Situation
Dahlem-Dorf	U3	12 October 1913	open cut
Deutsche Oper	U2	14 May 1906	underground

== E ==
Station	Line	Opened	Situation
Eberswalder Straße	U2	27 July 1913	elevated
Eisenacher Straße	U7	29 January 1971	underground
Elsterwerdaer Platz	U5	21 July 1988	embankment
Ernst-Reuter-Platz	U2	14 December 1902	underground

== F ==
Station	Line	Opened	Situation
Fehrbelliner Platz	U3	12 October 1913	underground
Fehrbelliner Platz	U7	29 January 1971	underground
Frankfurter Allee	U5	21 December 1930	underground
Frankfurter Tor	U5	21 December 1930	underground
Franz-Neumann-Platz	U8	27 April 1987	underground
Freie Universität (Thielplatz)	U3	12 October 1913	open cut
Friedrichsfelde	U5	21 December 1930	underground
Friedrichstraße	U6	30 January 1923	underground
Friedrich-Wilhelm-Platz	U9	29 January 1971	underground

== G ==
Station	Line	Opened	Situation
Gesundbrunnen	U8	18 April 1930	underground
Gleisdreieck	U1	3 November 1912	elevated
Gleisdreieck	U2	3 November 1912	elevated
Gleisdreieck	U3	3 November 1912	elevated
Gneisenaustraße	U7	19 April 1924	underground
Görlitzer Bahnhof	U1	18 February 1902	elevated
Grenzallee	U7	21 December 1930	underground
Güntzelstraße	U9	29 January 1971	underground

== H ==
Station	Line	Opened	Situation
Halemweg	U7	1 October 1980	underground
Hallesches Tor	U1	18 February 1902	elevated
Hallesches Tor	U3	18 February 1902	elevated
Hallesches Tor	U6	30 January 1923	underground
Hansaplatz	U9	28 August 1961	underground
Haselhorst	U7	1 October 1984	underground
Hauptbahnhof	U5	8 August 2009	underground
Hausvogteiplatz	U2	1 October 1908	underground
Heidelberger Platz	U3	12 October 1913	underground
Heinrich-Heine-Straße	U8	6 April 1928	underground
Hellersdorf	U5	1 July 1989	open cut
Hermannplatz	U7	11 April 1926	underground
Hermannplatz	U8	17 July 1927	underground
Hermannstraße	U8	13 July 1996	underground
Hönow	U5	1 July 1989	at grade
Hohenzollernplatz	U3	12 October 1913	underground
Holzhauser Straße	U6	31 May 1958	embankment

== I ==
Station	Line	Opened	Situation
Innsbrucker Platz	U4	1 December 1910	underground

== J ==
Station	Line	Opened	Situation
Jakob-Kaiser-Platz	U7	1 October 1980	underground
Jannowitzbrücke	U8	18 April 1930	underground
Johannisthaler Chaussee	U7	2 January 1970	underground
Jungfernheide	U7	1 October 1980	underground

== K ==
Station	Line	Opened	Situation
Kaiserdamm	U2	29 March 1908	underground
Kaiserin-Augusta-Straße	U6	28 February 1966	underground
Karl-Bonhoeffer-Nervenklinik	U8	24 September 1994	underground
Karl-Marx-Straße	U7	11 April 1926	underground
Kaulsdorf-Nord	U5	1 July 1989	open cut
Kienberg (Gärten der Welt)	U5	1 July 1989	open cut
Kleistpark	U7	29 January 1971	underground
Klosterstraße	U2	1 July 1913	underground
Kochstraße	U6	30 January 1923	underground
Konstanzer Straße	U7	28 April 1978	underground
Kottbusser Tor	U1	18 February 1902	elevated
Kottbusser Tor	U3	18 February 1902	elevated
Kottbusser Tor	U8	12 February 1928	underground
Krumme Lanke	U3	22 December 1929	open cut
Kurfürstendamm	U1	2 September 1961	underground
Kurfürstendamm	U9	28 August 1961	underground
Kurfürstenstraße	U1	26 October 1926	underground
Kurfürstenstraße	U3	26 October 1926	underground
Kurt-Schumacher-Platz	U6	3 May 1956	underground

== L ==
Station	Line	Opened	Situation
Leinestraße	U8	4 August 1929	underground
Leopoldplatz	U6	8 March 1923	underground
Leopoldplatz	U9	28 August 1961	underground
Lichtenberg	U5	21 December 1930	underground
Lindauer Allee	U8	24 September 1994	underground
Lipschitzallee	U7	2 January 1970	underground
Louis-Lewin-Straße	U5	1 July 1989	at grade

== M ==
Station	Line	Opened	Situation
Magdalenenstraße	U5	21 December 1930	underground
Märkisches Museum	U2	1 July 1913	underground
Mehringdamm	U6	7 April 1924	underground
Mehringdamm	U7	7 April 1924	underground
Mendelssohn-Bartholdy-Park	U2	2 October 1998	elevated
Mierendorffplatz	U7	1 October 1980	underground
Möckernbrücke	U1	18 February 1902	elevated
Möckernbrücke	U3	18 February 1902	elevated
Möckernbrücke	U7	28 February 1966	underground
Moritzplatz	U8	6 April 1928	underground
Museumsinsel	U5	9 July 2021	underground

== N ==
Station	Line	Opened	Situation
Naturkundemuseum	U6	30 January 1923	underground
Nauener Platz	U9	30 April 1976	underground
Neu-Westend	U2	20 May 1922	underground
Neukölln	U7	21 December 1930	underground
Nollendorfplatz	U2	11 March 1902	elevated
Nollendorfplatz	U1	26 October 1926	underground
Nollendorfplatz	U3	26 October 1926	underground
Nollendorfplatz	U4	26 October 1926	underground

== O ==
Station	Line	Opened	Situation
Olympia-Stadion	U2	8 June 1913	open cut
Onkel Toms Hütte	U3	22 December 1929	underground / open cut
Oranienburger Tor	U6	30 January 1923	underground
Oskar-Helene-Heim	U3	22 December 1929	open cut
Osloer Straße	U8	5 October 1977	underground
Osloer Straße	U9	30 April 1976	underground
Otisstraße	U6	31 May 1958	embankment

== P ==
Station	Line	Opened	Situation
Pankow	U2	16 August 2000	underground
Pankstraße	U8	5 October 1977	underground
Paracelsus-Bad	U8	30 April 1987	underground
Paradestraße	U6	10 September 1927	underground
Parchimer Allee	U7	28 September 1963	underground
Paulsternstraße	U7	1 October 1984	underground
Platz der Luftbrücke	U6	14 February 1926	underground
Podbielskiallee	U3	12 October 1913	open cut
Potsdamer Platz	U2	18 February 1902	underground
Prinzenstraße	U1	18 August 1902	elevated
Prinzenstraße	U3	18 August 1902	elevated

== R ==
Station	Line	Opened	Situation
Rathaus Neukölln	U7	11 April 1926	underground
Rathaus Reinickendorf	U8	24 September 1994	underground
Rathaus Schöneberg	U4	1 December 1910	at grade
Rathaus Spandau	U7	1 October 1984	underground
Rathaus Steglitz	U9	30 September 1974	underground
Rehberge	U6	3 May 1956	underground
Reinickendorfer Straße	U6	8 March 1923	underground
Residenzstraße	U8	27 April 1987	underground
Richard-Wagner-Platz	U7	14 May 1906	underground
Rohrdamm	U7	1 October 1980	underground
Rosa-Luxemburg-Platz	U2	27 July 1913	underground
Rosenthaler Platz	U8	18 April 1930	underground
Rotes Rathaus	U5	4 December 2020	underground
Rüdesheimer Platz	U3	12 October 1913	underground
Rudow	U7	1 July 1972	underground
Ruhleben	U2	22 December 1929	embankment

== S ==
Station	Line	Opened	Situation
Samariterstraße	U5	21 December 1930	underground
Scharnweberstraße	U6	31 May 1958	embankment
Schillingstraße	U5	21 December 1930	underground
Schlesisches Tor	U1	18 February 1902	elevated
Schlesisches Tor	U3	18 February 1902	elevated
Schloßstraße	U9	30 September 1974	underground
Schönhauser Allee	U2	27 July 1913	elevated
Schönleinstraße	U8	17 July 1927	underground
Schwartzkopffstraße	U6	8 March 1923	underground
Seestraße	U6	8 March 1923	underground
Senefelderplatz	U2	27 July 1913	underground
Siemensdamm	U7	1 October 1980	underground
Sophie-Charlotte-Platz	U2	29 March 1908	underground
Spichernstraße	U3	2 June 1959	underground
Spichernstraße	U9	28 August 1961	underground
Spittelmarkt	U2	1 October 1908	underground
Stadtmitte	U2	1 October 1908	underground
Stadtmitte	U6	30 January 1923	underground
Strausberger Platz	U5	21 December 1930	underground
Südstern	U7	14 December 1924	underground

== T ==
Station	Line	Opened	Situation
Tempelhof	U6	22 December 1929	underground
Theodor-Heuss-Platz	U2	29 March 1908	underground
Tierpark	U5	25 June 1973	underground
Turmstraße	U9	28 August 1961	underground

== U ==
Station	Line	Opened	Situation
Uhlandstraße	U1	12 October 1913	underground
Ullsteinstraße	U6	28 February 1966	underground
Unter den Linden	U5	4 December 2020	underground
Unter den Linden	U6	4 December 2020	underground

== V ==
Station	Line	Opened	Situation
Viktoria-Luise-Platz	U4	1 December 1910	underground
Vinetastraße	U2	29 June 1930	underground
Voltastraße	U8	18 April 1930	underground

== W ==
Station	Line	Opened	Situation
Walther-Schreiber-Platz	U9	29 January 1971	underground
Warschauer Straße	U1	17 August 1902	elevated
Warschauer Straße	U3	17 August 1902	elevated
Weberwiese	U5	21 December 1930	underground
Wedding	U6	8 March 1923	underground
Weinmeisterstraße	U8	18 April 1930	underground
Westhafen	U9	28 August 1961	underground
Westphalweg	U6	28 February 1966	underground
Wilmersdorfer Straße	U7	28 April 1978	underground
Wittenau	U8	24 September 1994	underground
Wittenbergplatz	U1	11 March 1902	underground
Wittenbergplatz	U2	11 March 1902	underground
Wittenbergplatz	U3	11 March 1902	underground
Wuhletal	U5	1 July 1989	embankment
Wutzkyallee	U7	2 January 1970	underground

== Y ==
Station	Line	Opened	Situation
Yorckstraße	U7	29 January 1971	underground

== Z ==
Station	Line	Opened	Situation
Zitadelle	U7	1 October 1984	underground
Zoologischer Garten	U2	11 March 1902	underground
Zoologischer Garten	U9	28 August 1961	underground
Zwickauer Damm	U7	2 January 1970	underground
