= Holzhauser Straße station =

Station of the Berlin U-Bahn

Coordinates: 52°34′33″N 13°17′46″E

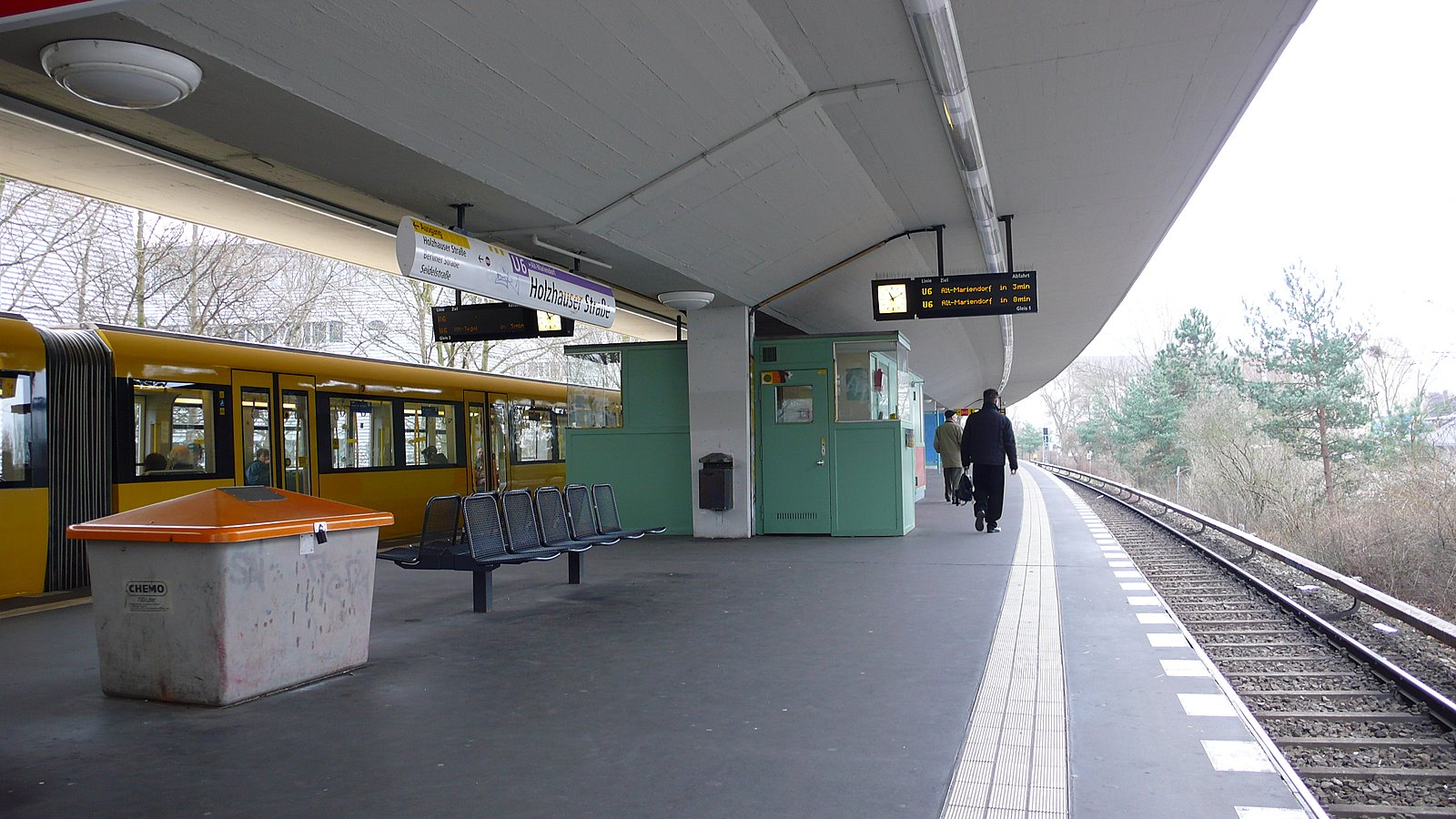
Platform of the station

Holzhauser Straße is a Berlin U-Bahn station located on the U6 line. The station was built on an embankment by Grimmek in 1958.

Preceding station	Berlin U-Bahn	Following station
Borsigwerke towards Alt-Tegel	U6	Otisstraße towards Alt-Mariendorf
