= Ullsteinstraße station =

Station of the Berlin U-Bahn

Coordinates: 52°27′14″N 13°23′04″E

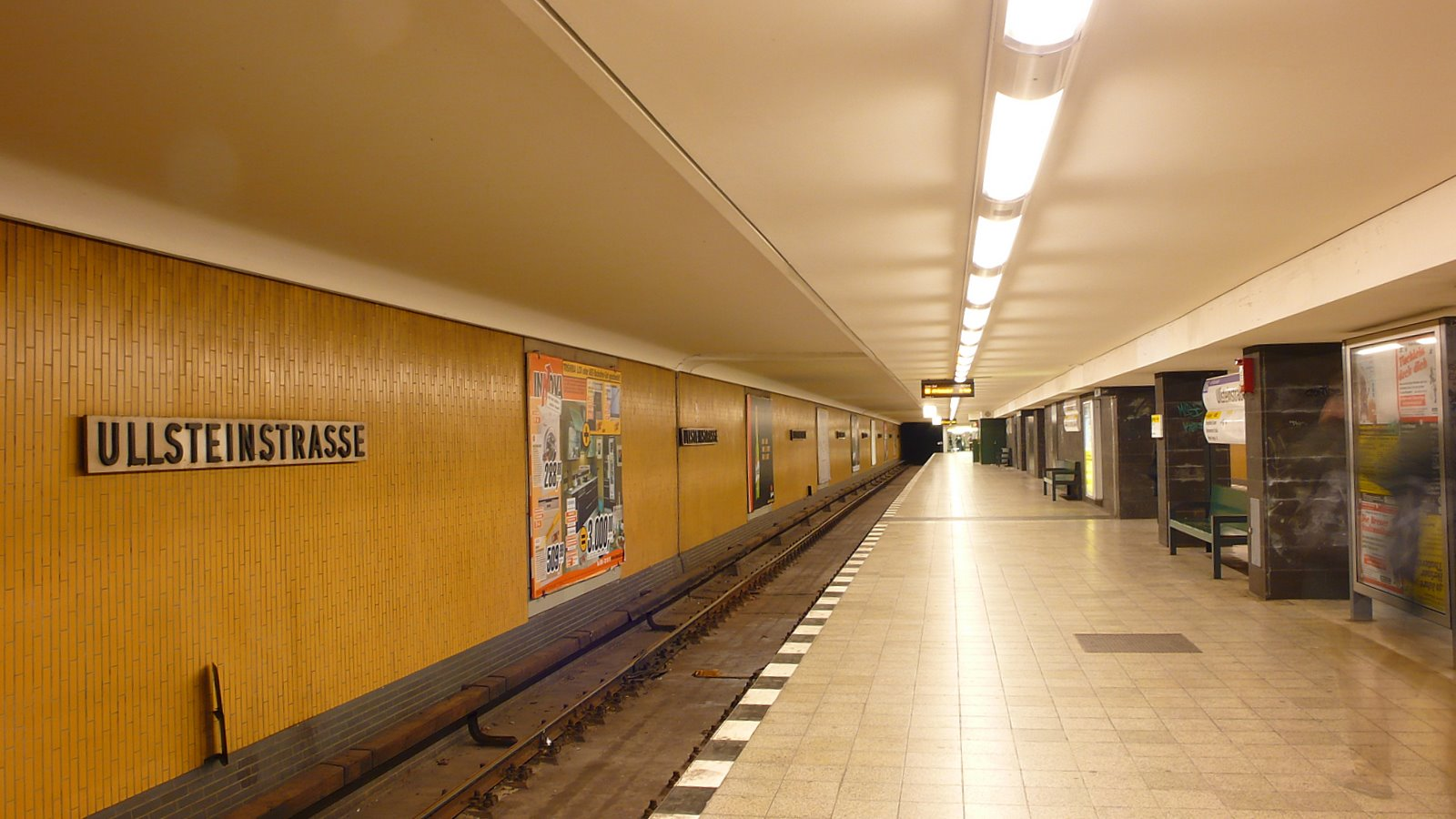
U-Bahn station Ullsteinstraße

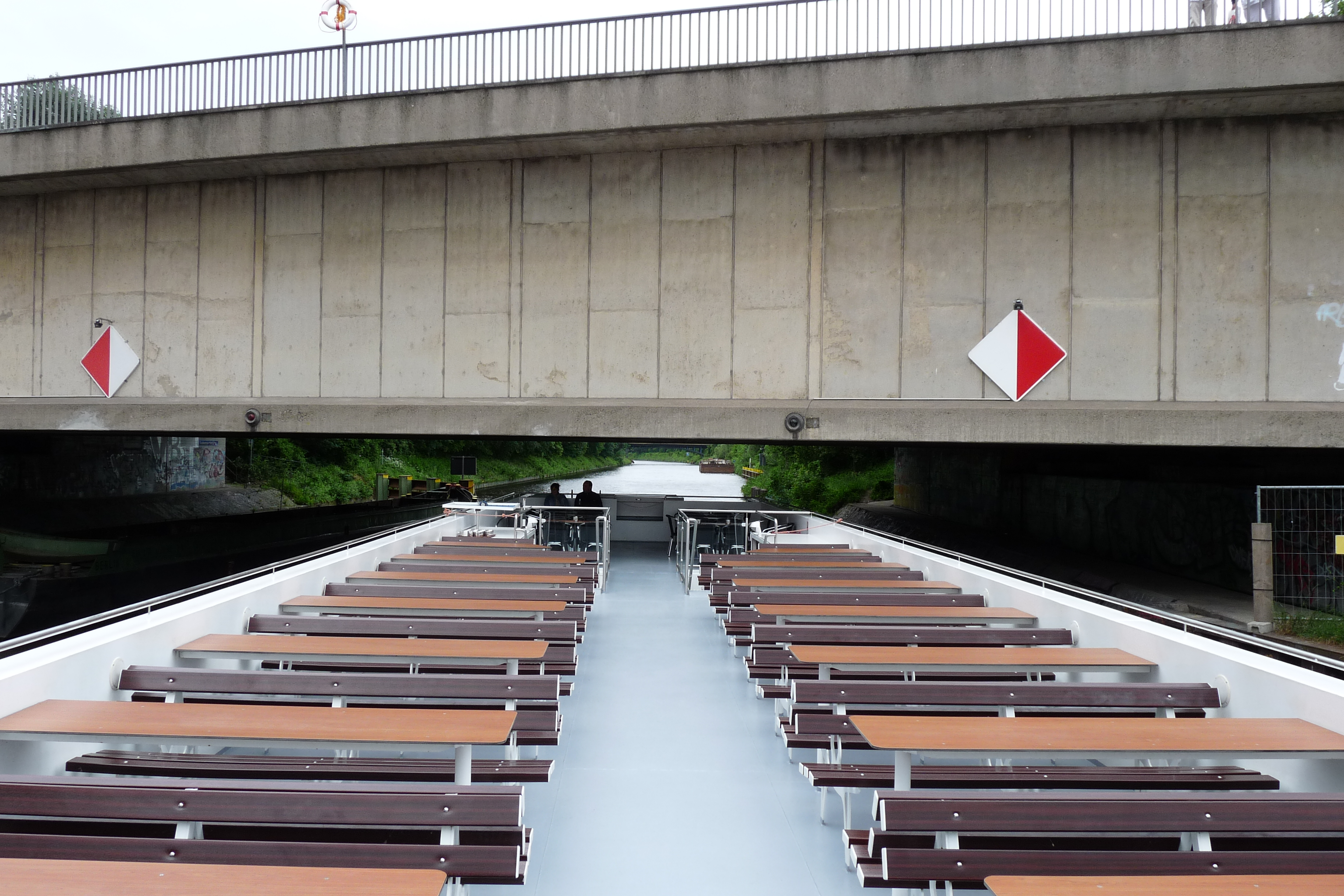
Stubenrauch Bridge, from the west, over the Teltow Canal. The subway runs inside the bridge, below street-level.

Ullsteinstraße is a Berlin U-Bahn station located on the U6 line. The station was designed by R. G. Rümmler and opened in 1966.

The station is located below B96, where it crosses the Teltow Canal via the Stubenrauch Bridge. The U6 crosses the canal on the eastern bridge, which carries the northbound lanes of the road, in a concrete box below the road deck. A portion of Ullsteinstraße station is, therefore, elevated above the river on the bridge. This configuration limits the clearance available to boats on the canal.

== History ==
The station was built as part of the southern extension of the Tempelhof branch of U6 to Alt-Mariendorf. The planning goes back to the Weimar Republic, but the construction of this section only began in 1961. Like the other stations on the extensions of U6 as well as the U7 branch to Neukolln extension to Spandau and Rudow, the station was designed by Rainer G. Rümmler.

Rümmler designed a 110 meter long and almost nine meter wide central platform with two entrances. The design is similar to the contemporary metro station Möckernbrücke on the U7 line: The walls behind the tracks are tiled in yellow, the supporting pillars and the wall under the bridge, which divides the platform almost the entire length, are covered with dark basalt . The floor received bright ceramic tiles, A special feature was also the public address system: Instead of many distributed speakers, the station had a single track-long sound pipe, which had only one central speaker. The sound could escape through numerous small openings above the platform. Meanwhile, the station has a normal public address system.

In October 2013, after one year of construction, an elevator was put into operation. The station has since barrier-free accessible.

Preceding station	Berlin U-Bahn	Following station
Kaiserin-Augusta-Straße towards Alt-Tegel	U6	Westphalweg towards Alt-Mariendorf
