= Alt-Tempelhof station =

Station of the Berlin U-Bahn

Coordinates: 52°27′57″N 13°23′08″E

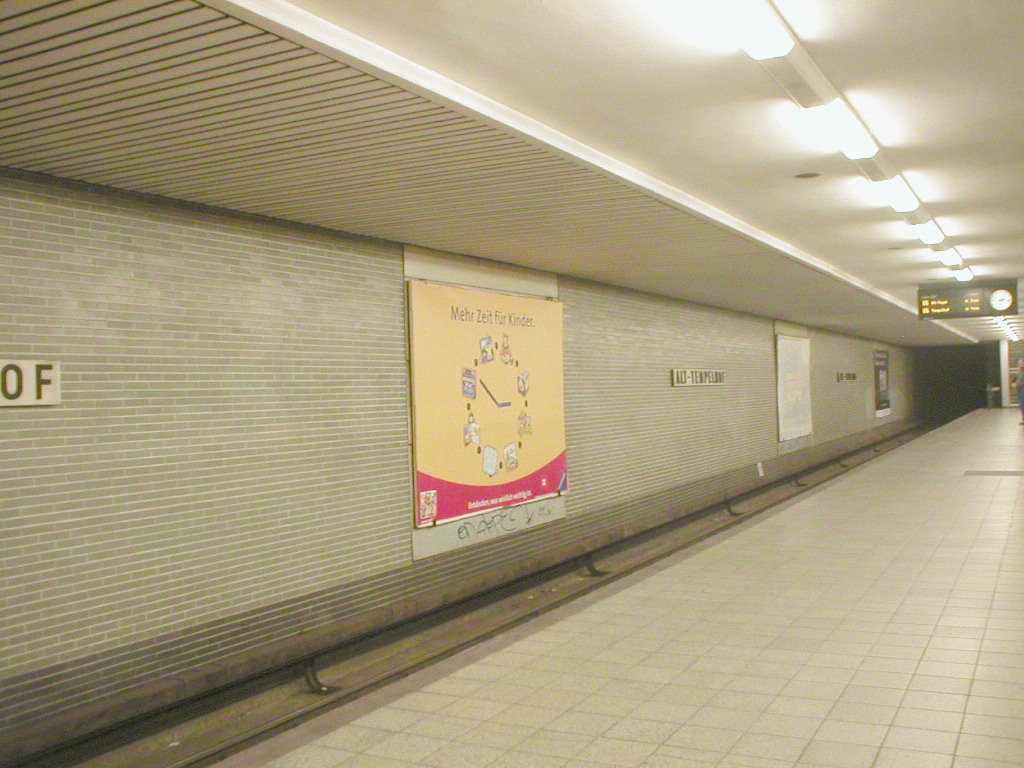
- Alt-Tempelhof U-Bahn station

General information
- Location: Germany

Services
Preceding station	Berlin U-Bahn	Following station
Tempelhof towards Alt-Tegel	U6	Kaiserin-Augusta-Straße towards Alt-Mariendorf
Location

Alt-Tempelhof (Old Tempelhof) is a Berlin U-Bahn station on the U6. It is located under Tempelhofer Damm in the centre of the former village of Tempelhof, now a Berlin district within the borough of Tempelhof-Schöneberg. The station opened on 28 February 1966.

== Overview ==
The extension of Line C of the Berlin U-Bahn (today called U6) through the centre of Tempelhof to Mariendorf was already planned before World War II, and was begun in the late 1930s. A tunnel was dug south from the turnaround at Tempelhof station almost to the location of the Alt-Tempelhof station, and a somewhat longer tunnel section was also dug further south, between today's Alt-Tempelhof and Kaiserin-Augusta-Straße stations. However, because of World War II, postwar money problems, and a serious fire in the turnaround in August 1945 which damaged the tunnel, the work suspended in 1941 was not resumed and construction of the stations did not begin until 1961. It was possible to make use of the tunnels dug some twenty years previously, but not without modifications, because the Alt-Tempelhof station had originally been planned to be further south, near the Tempelhof town hall.

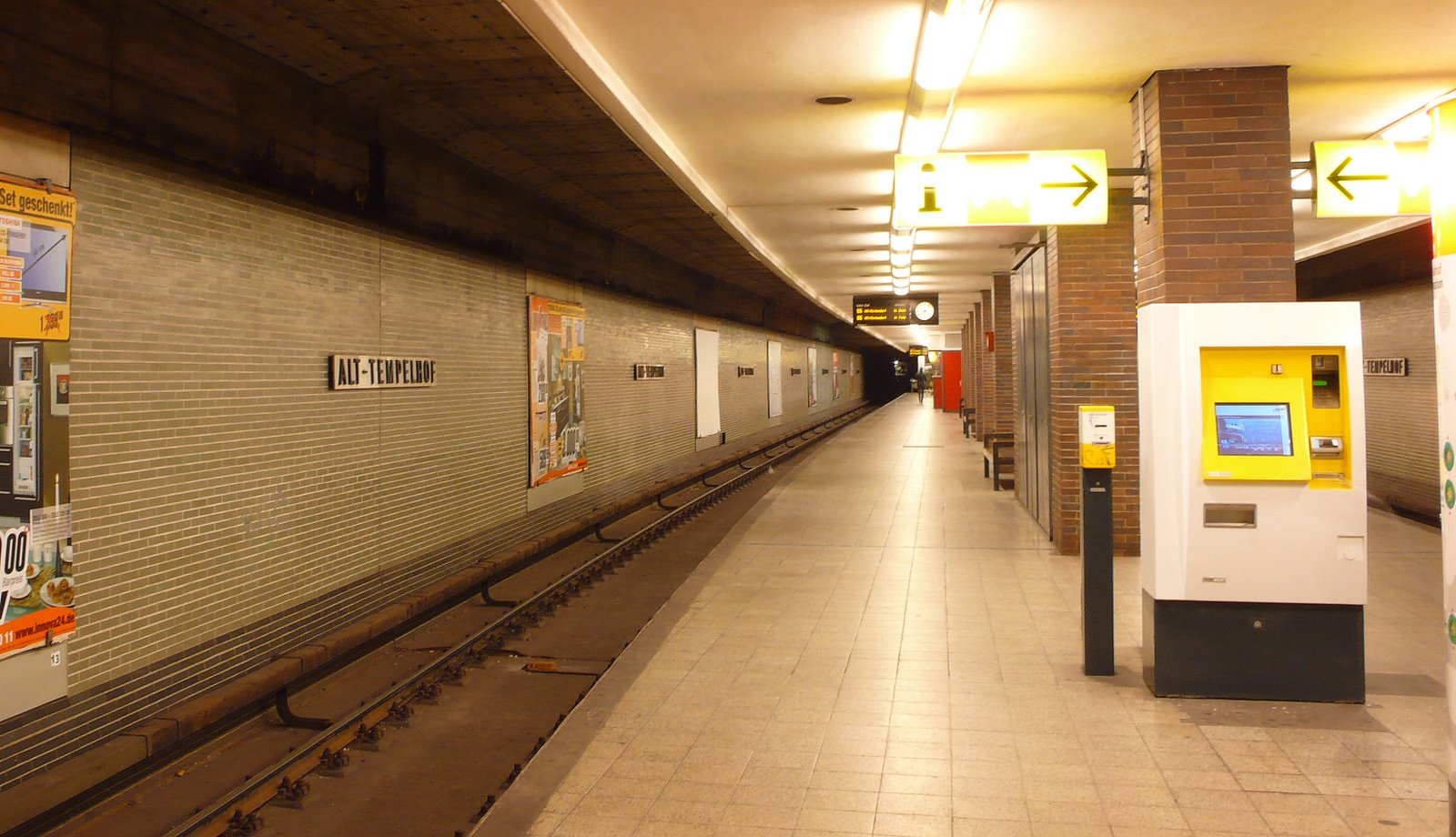
Platform

Rough construction of the Alt-Tempelhof station was finished in 1962, while the other stations of the extension to Alt-Mariendorf were not built until the following year. They were all opened at once on 28 February 1966, at which time Line C was renamed Line 6; in 1984 it became U6.

The Alt-Tempelhof station was finished to a design by Bruno Grimmek, who retired soon afterwards; his successor as architect with the Berlin U-Bahn, Rainer Rümmler, assisted with this station and was responsible for the others in the line extension. Like all the extension stations, it has a centre platform and exits at each end and is utilitarian in appearance. The Alt-Tempelhof station has grey-green tiles on the walls and brick cladding on the platform columns.

The station has exits at each end and in the middle by way of a mezzanine floor. It has escalators but is yet to be equipped with a lift.
