= Scharnweberstraße station =

Station of the Berlin U-Bahn

Coordinates: 52°34′01″N 13°18′46″E

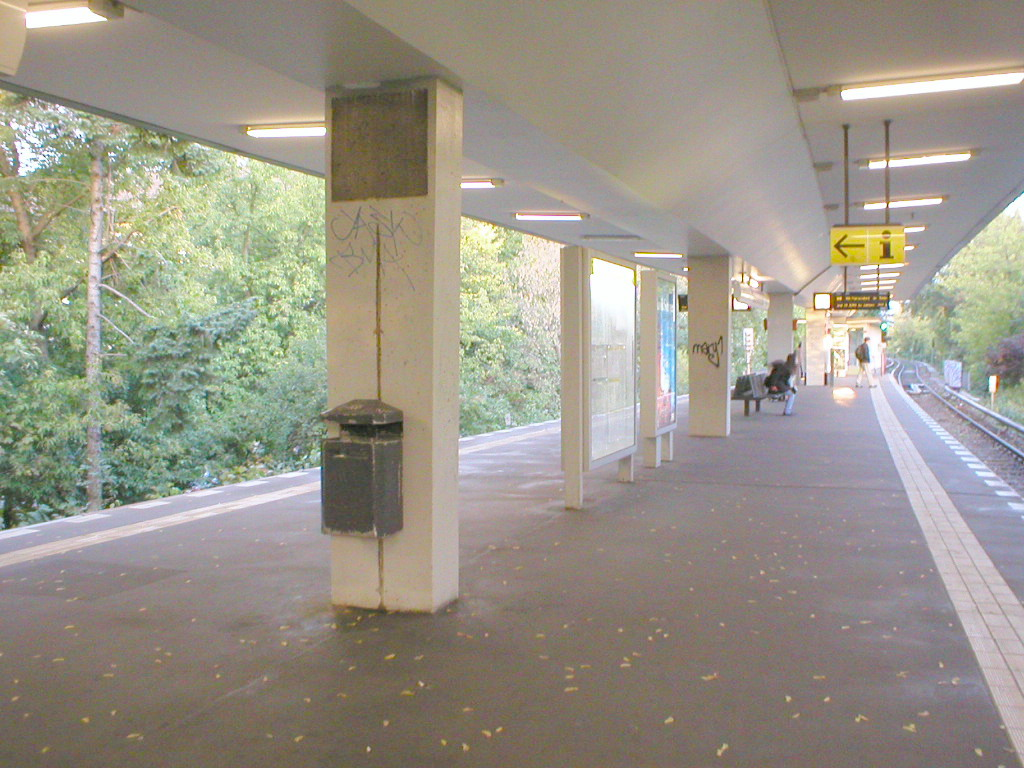
Scharnweberstraße U-Bahn station

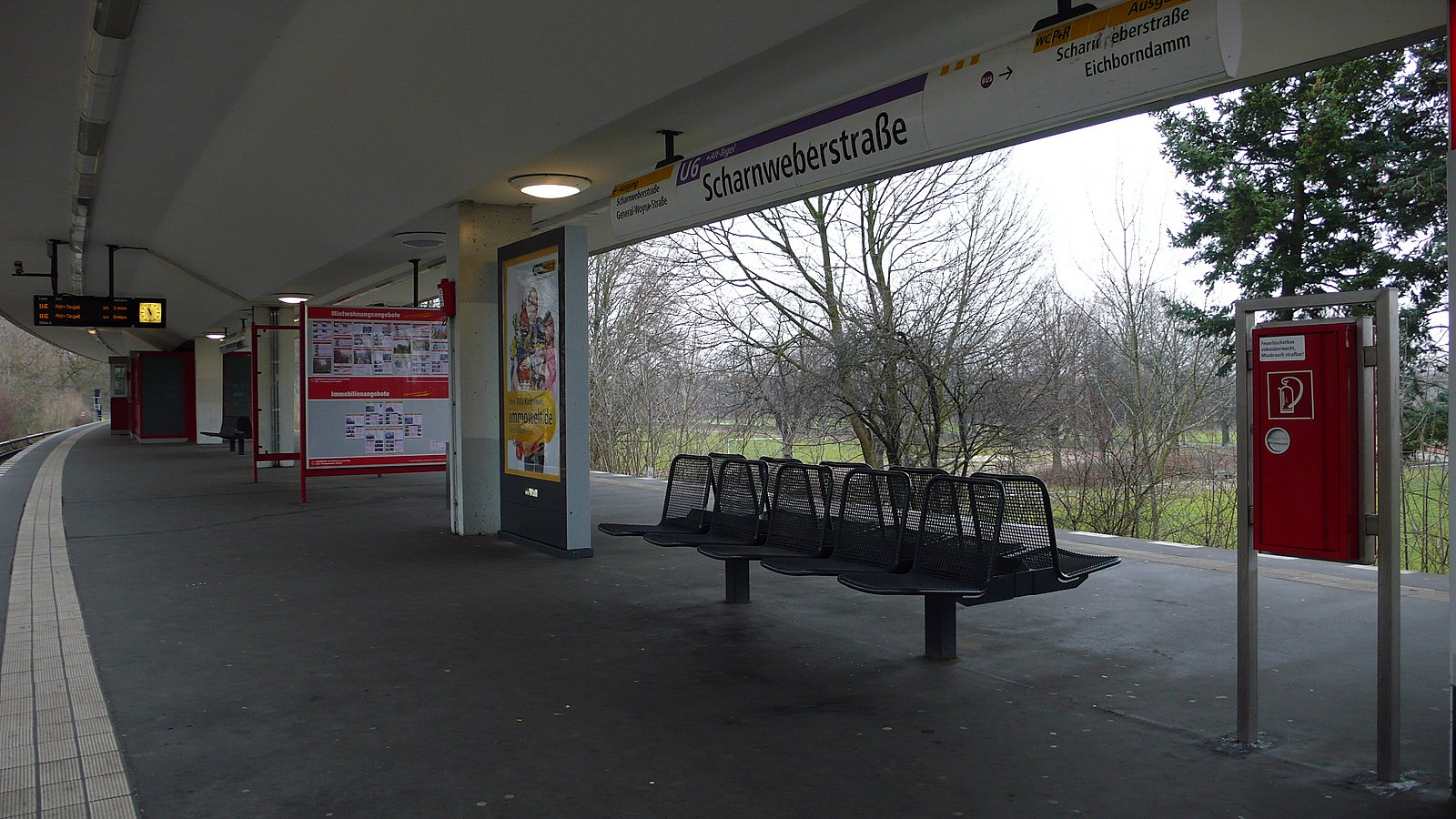
Platform view

Scharnweberstraße is a Berlin U-Bahn station located on the U6. It was constructed by B. Grimmek in 1958. Due to the extension of the U6, the trains had to go above ground after Kurt-Schumacher-Platz station. Soil for the embankment on which the line is built came from excavations for the U9, which was being built in parallel. As the trains had to go above ground, Berliner Verkehrsbetriebe (BVG), who operate the Berlin U-Bahn, had to install windscreen wipers on the trains.

Preceding station	Berlin U-Bahn	Following station
Otisstraße towards Alt-Tegel	U6	Kurt-Schumacher-Platz towards Alt-Mariendorf
