= Rehberge station =

Station of the Berlin U-Bahn

Rehberge
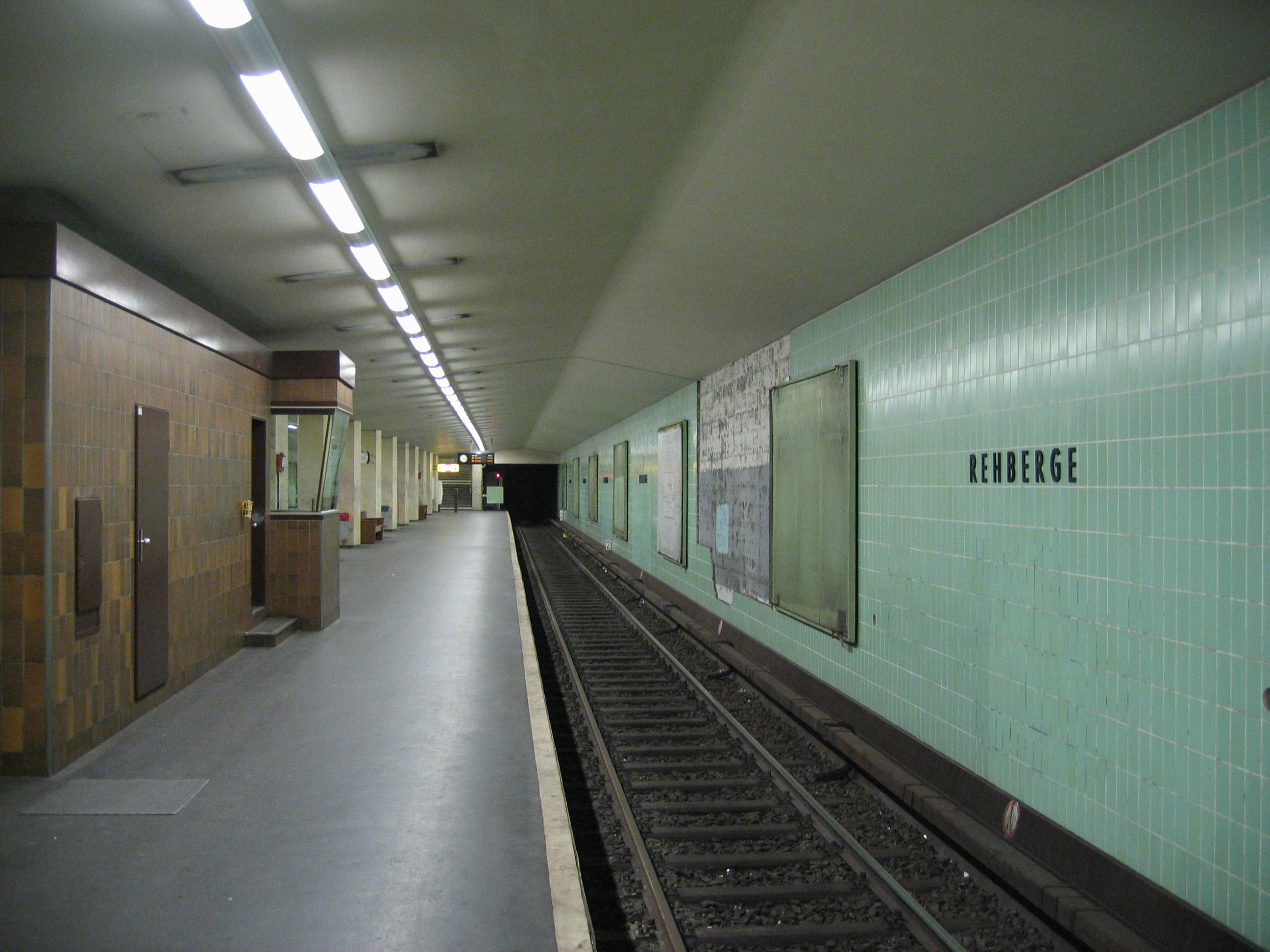

General information
- Location: Wedding
- Coordinates: 52°33′24.1″N 13°20′28.3″E
- Owner: Berliner Verkehrsbetriebe
- Operator: Berliner Verkehrsbetriebe
- Line: U6

Construction
- Architect: Bruno Grimmek

Other information
- Status: In use
- Station code: RB
- Fare zone: Berlin B fare zone

History
- Opened: 3 May 1958

Services
Preceding station	Berlin U-Bahn	Following station
Afrikanische Straße towards Alt-Tegel	U6	Seestraße towards Alt-Mariendorf
Location

Rehberge is a station in the Wedding district of Berlin which serves the U6 line and is operated by the BVG. The station is named for Volkspark Rehberge, the large public park approximately 500m away, a name which literally translates as '(Roe) Deer Mountains'. The station was opened on 3 May 1956 (designed by B. Grimmek), along with the rest of the route between Seestraße and Kurt-Schumacher-Platz.

The subway station Rehberge is part of the so-called "Müllerstraße subway", an extension of the former C-Nord line in the direction of Tegel. The expansion covered around 2.4 kilometers and provided for three stations. Starting point was the subway station Seestraße.

For the first time the extension of the line to the north was proposed in April 1929 by Ernst Reuter, the then Berlin City Council for Transport. In July 1929, the expansion had already begun, but had to be discontinued in fall of 1930 because of the financial crisis in Berlin triggered by the Great Depression.

After the Second World War, Ernst Reuter, now Governing Mayor of Berlin, proposed the further expansion of the line. In August 1953, the Senate, using the preparatory work of 1929/1930, decided to extend the line to Tegel. On 3 May 1956 the route extension was opened.

The architectural design of the stations along the new line was carried out by Senate building director Bruno Grimmek, which was based on older designs by Alfred Grenander for other routes. The platforms were each centrally located, are about eight meters wide and have central supports with hexagonal profile.

The subway station Rehberge - originally the names Goethepark and Otawistraße were intended for the station - has a central platform and in the mezzanine a lobby. At both ends of the platforms there are two entrances each. The central supports on the platform have a hexagonal profile. Until the renovation they were covered with yellow (visually similar to the terrazzo) stones, the walls of the subway station with mint green ceramic tiles. The name of the station is in capital letters mounted directly on the tiles of the wall paneling, the lighting - at that time a novelty - was made from the beginning by neon lamps.

From autumn 2009 Rehberge underground station was renovated. An elevator has been in operation since 1 December 2010, providing barrier-free access, with costs of around 900,000 euros. The walls were tiled anew with large, light green ceramic tiles. Instead of the advertising space, photos were taken showing the surroundings of the station in earlier times. The pillars received dark green tiles. The vestibules and access buildings were redesigned with green and Rehmotiven. The original asphalt platform pavement was replaced by natural stone slabs and a blind guidance system was installed.

Rehberge station is located towards the northern end of the Müllerstraße, one of Wedding's principal shopping streets and thoroughfares. It serves a relatively densely populated area of Berlin.

Preceding station	Berlin U-Bahn	Following station
Afrikanische Straße towards Alt-Tegel	U6	Seestraße towards Alt-Mariendorf
