= Kaiserin-Augusta-Straße station =

Station of the Berlin U-Bahn

Coordinates: 52°27′36″N 13°23′5″E

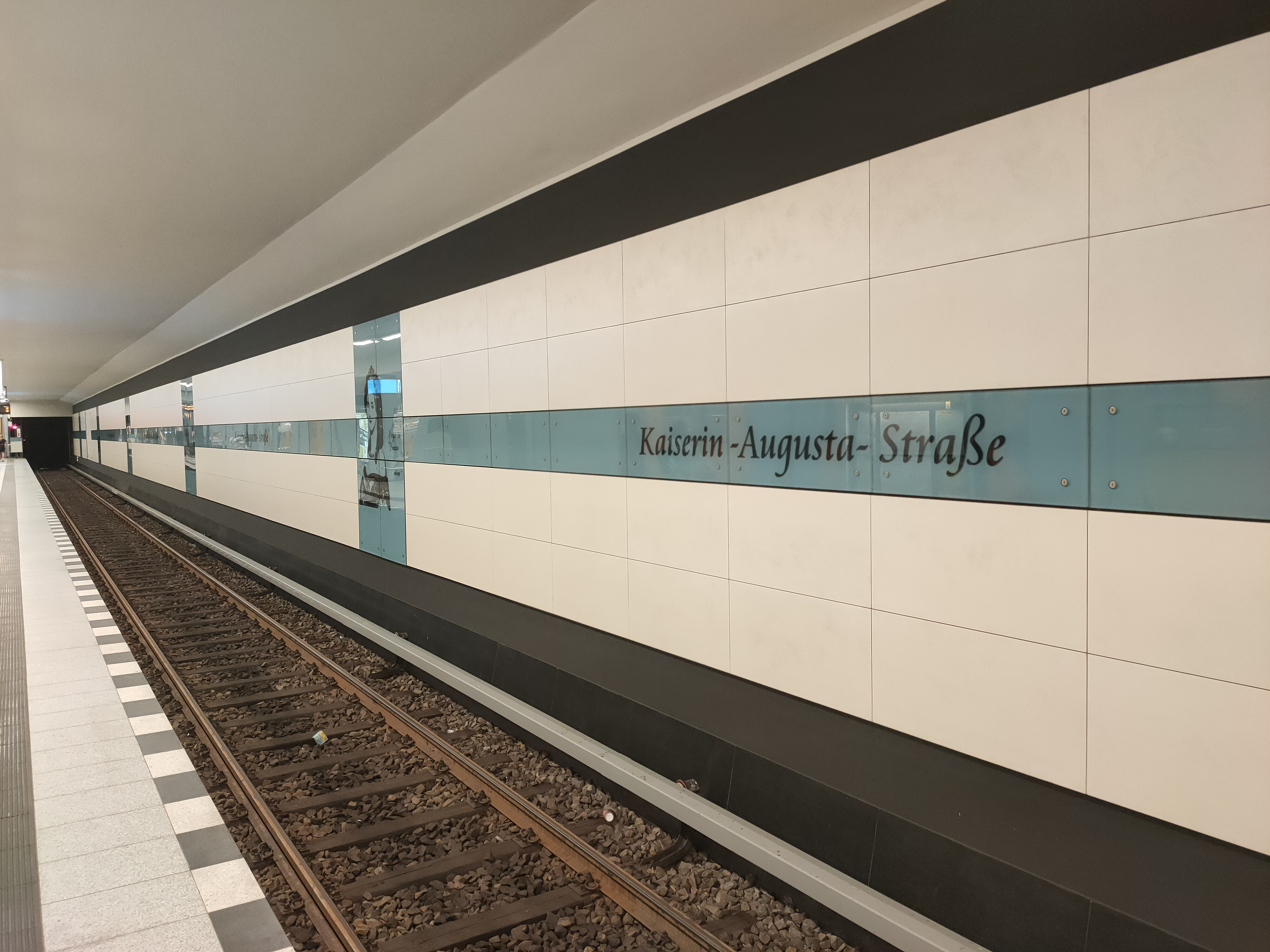
Platform, Kaiserin-Augusta-Straße U-Bahn station

Kaiserin-Augusta-Straße is a Berlin U-Bahn station located on the U6. Opened in 1966 by R. G. Rümmler, it has direct access to the neighbouring building, which used to house a department store. As of 2025, the former department store building houses a supermarket.

| Preceding station | Berlin U-Bahn | Following station |
|---|---|---|
| Alt-Tempelhof towards Alt-Tegel | U6 | Ullsteinstraße towards Alt-Mariendorf |
