= Afrikanische Straße station =

Station of the Berlin U-Bahn

Coordinates: 52°33′37″N 13°20′05″E

Afrikanische Straße
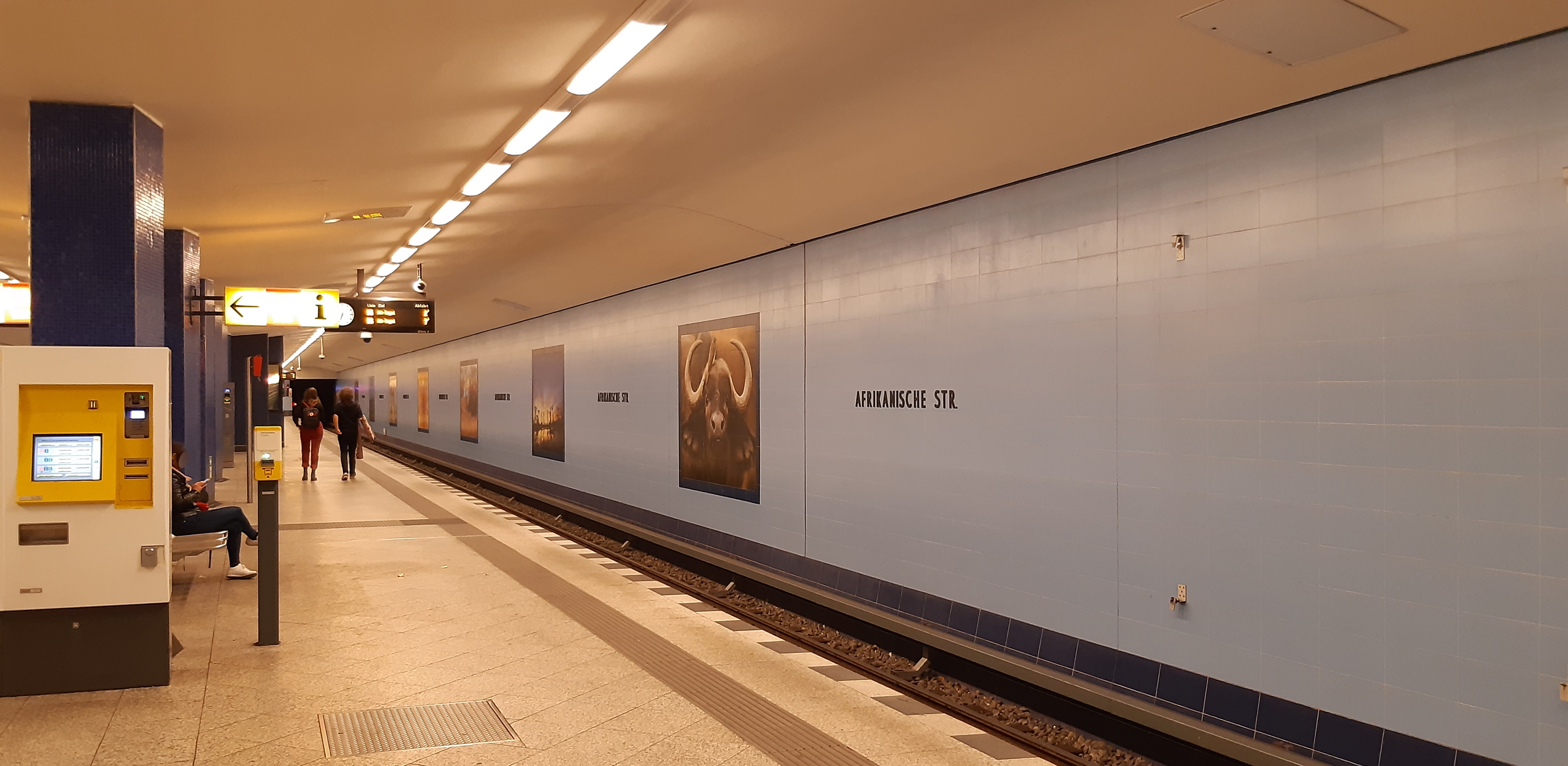
- U-Bahn station Afrikanische Straße

General information
- Location: Wedding
- Owner: Berliner Verkehrsbetriebe
- Operator: Berliner Verkehrsbetriebe
- Line: U6

Construction
- Structure type: Underground
- Architect: Bruno Grimmek

Services
Preceding station	Berlin U-Bahn	Following station
Kurt-Schumacher-Platz towards Alt-Tegel	U6	Rehberge towards Alt-Mariendorf
Location

Afrikanische Straße is a station in the Wedding district of Berlin which serves the U6 line and is operated by the BVG. The station is located under the Müllerstraße, one of the district's major shopping streets and thoroughfares, but named for another major street nearby.

On the U6, the station lies 631 m (0.4 mi) from Kurt-Schumacher-Platz U-Bahn Station and 587 m (0.4 mi) from Rehberge U-Bahn Station. The BVG refers to the station by the internal abbreviation Afr.

== History ==
Originally, the station was not in the plans for the expansion. But the post-war development as well as the Friedrich Ebert settlement built between 1929 and 1931 justified a station. It opened on 3 May 1956, along with the rest of the route between Seestraße and Kurt-Schumacher-Platz. There is a bus depot of the BVG near the station and it is often used by staff for access to the depot.

In 2016, in the course of a basic renovation, the station received new and larger wall tiles which are light blue. The former advertising space on the siding walls now carry dark blue bordered African motifs, as well as the departures from the mezzanine floors. The previous suffix Friedrich-Ebert-Siedlung (settlement) is no longer used.
