= Westphalweg station =

Station of the Berlin U-Bahn

Coordinates: 52.446°N 13.386°E

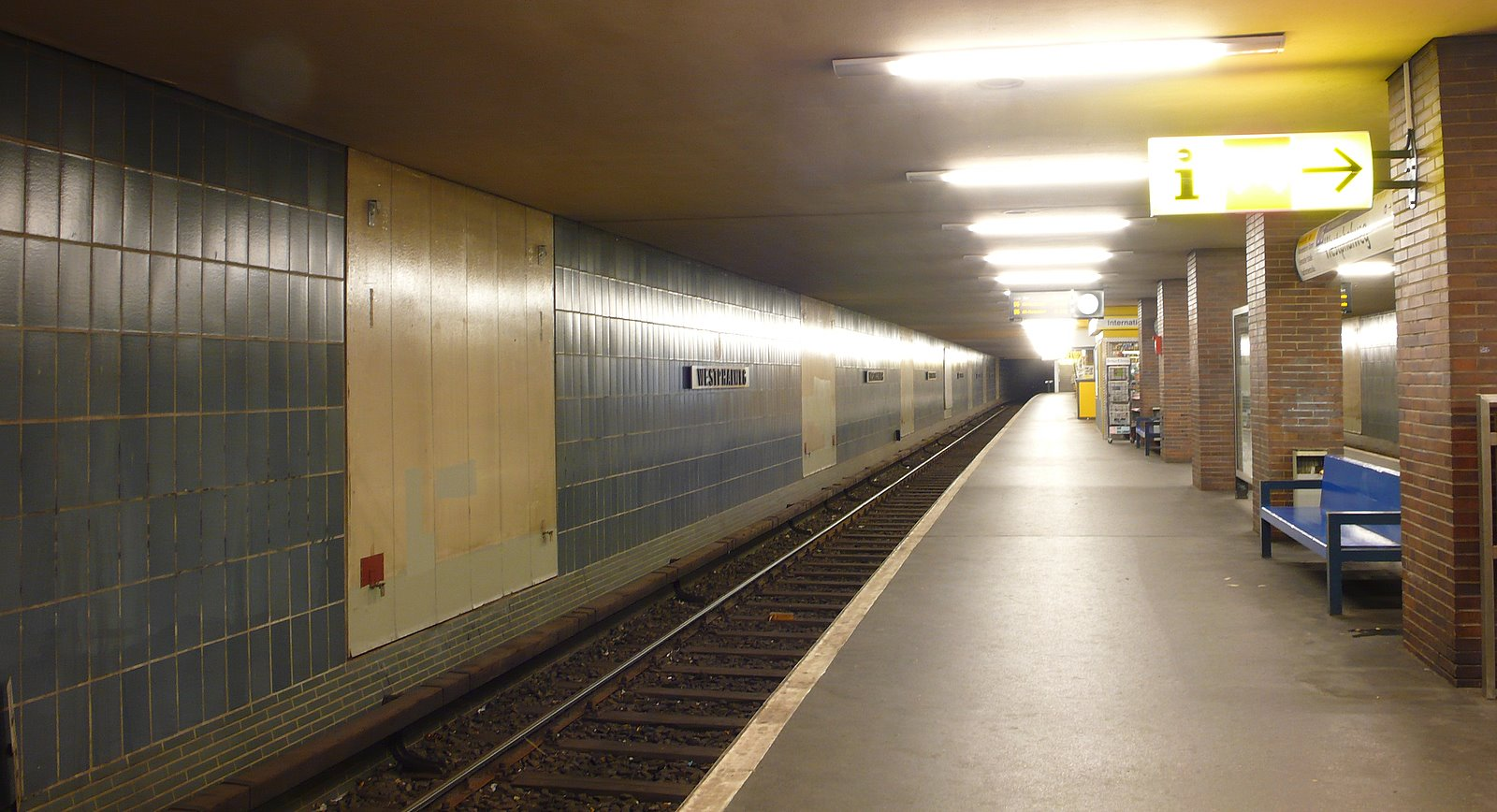
Platform view

Westphalweg is a Berlin U-Bahn station located on the U6.

Designed by Rümmler, the station was opened in 1966. In 1969, the first ticket machines were set up in this station.

Preceding station	Berlin U-Bahn	Following station
Ullsteinstraße towards Alt-Tegel	U6	Alt-Mariendorf Terminus
