= Kurt-Schumacher-Platz station =

Station of the Berlin U-Bahn

Coordinates: 52°33′48″N 13°19′39″E

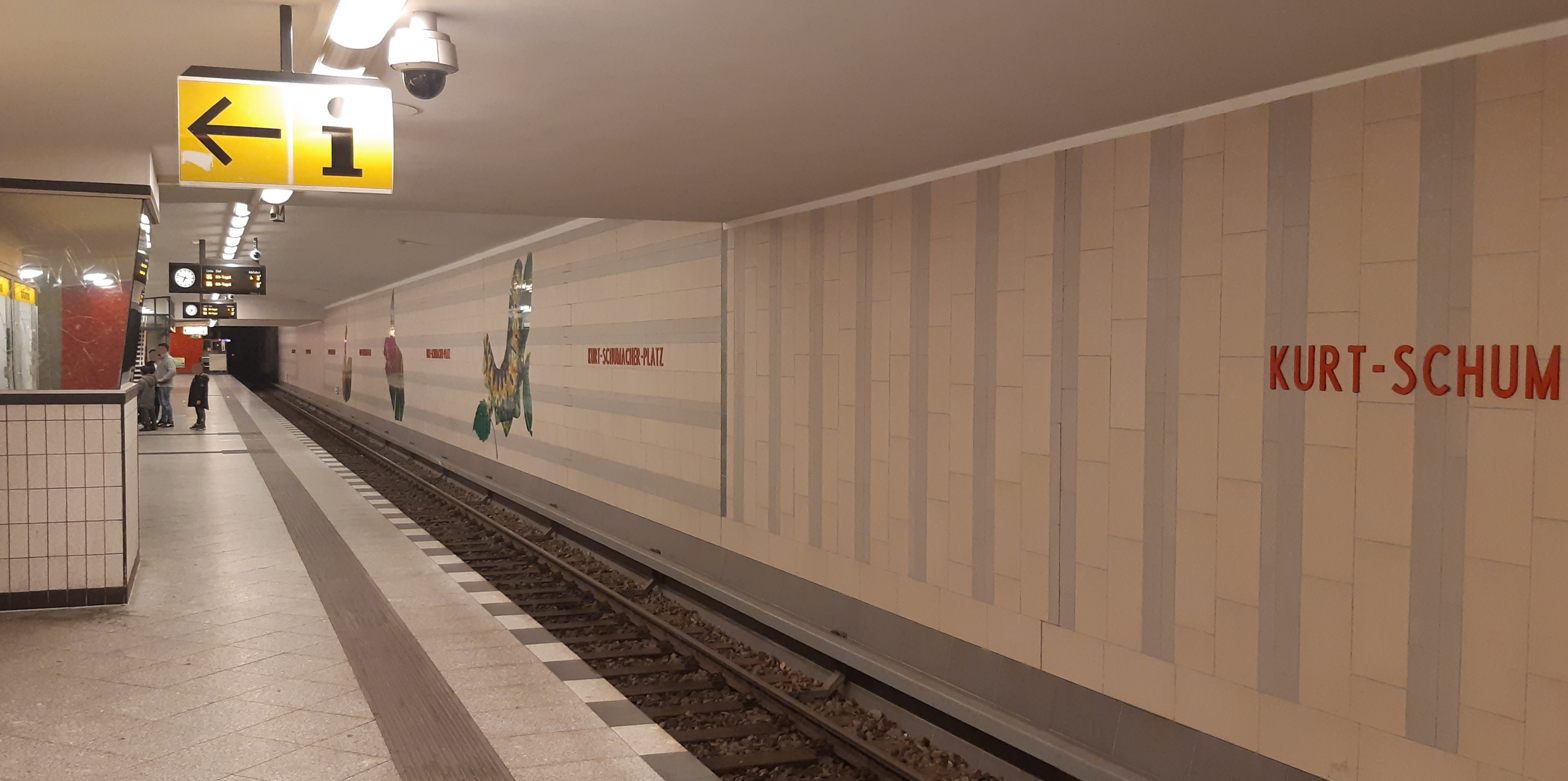
The platform at Kurt-Schumacher-Platz

Kurt-Schumacher-Platz is a station on the U6 line of the Berlin U-Bahn. There had been a bus link outside the station connecting Berlin's Tegel International Airport to the U-Bahn network. The station was opened on 3 May 1956 and named after famous German politician Kurt Schumacher.

The station was built by B. Grimmek, and has yellow tiles on the wall. The U6 extension between Seestrasse (Berlin U-Bahn) and Kurt-Schumacher-Platz was the first new subway line built after World War II in Berlin. After this station, the U6 trains travel above ground towards Alt-Tegel (except that Borsigwerke and Alt-Tegel stations are underground).

Preceding station	Berlin U-Bahn	Following station
Scharnweberstraße towards Alt-Tegel	U6	Afrikanische Straße towards Alt-Mariendorf
