= Borsigwerke =

Borsigwerke may refer to

- Borsigwerke, a former German company founded by August Borsig
- Borsigwerke (Berlin U-Bahn), a subway station of the Berlin U-Bahn
- Borsig Werke, a pseudonym of Alexander Hacke, musician
- Borsig Lokomotiv Werke (AEG), a locomotive works in Hennigsdorf owned by AEG after the takeover of Borsig AG
