= Borsigwerke station =

Station of the Berlin U-Bahn

Coordinates: 52°34′54″N 13°17′26″E

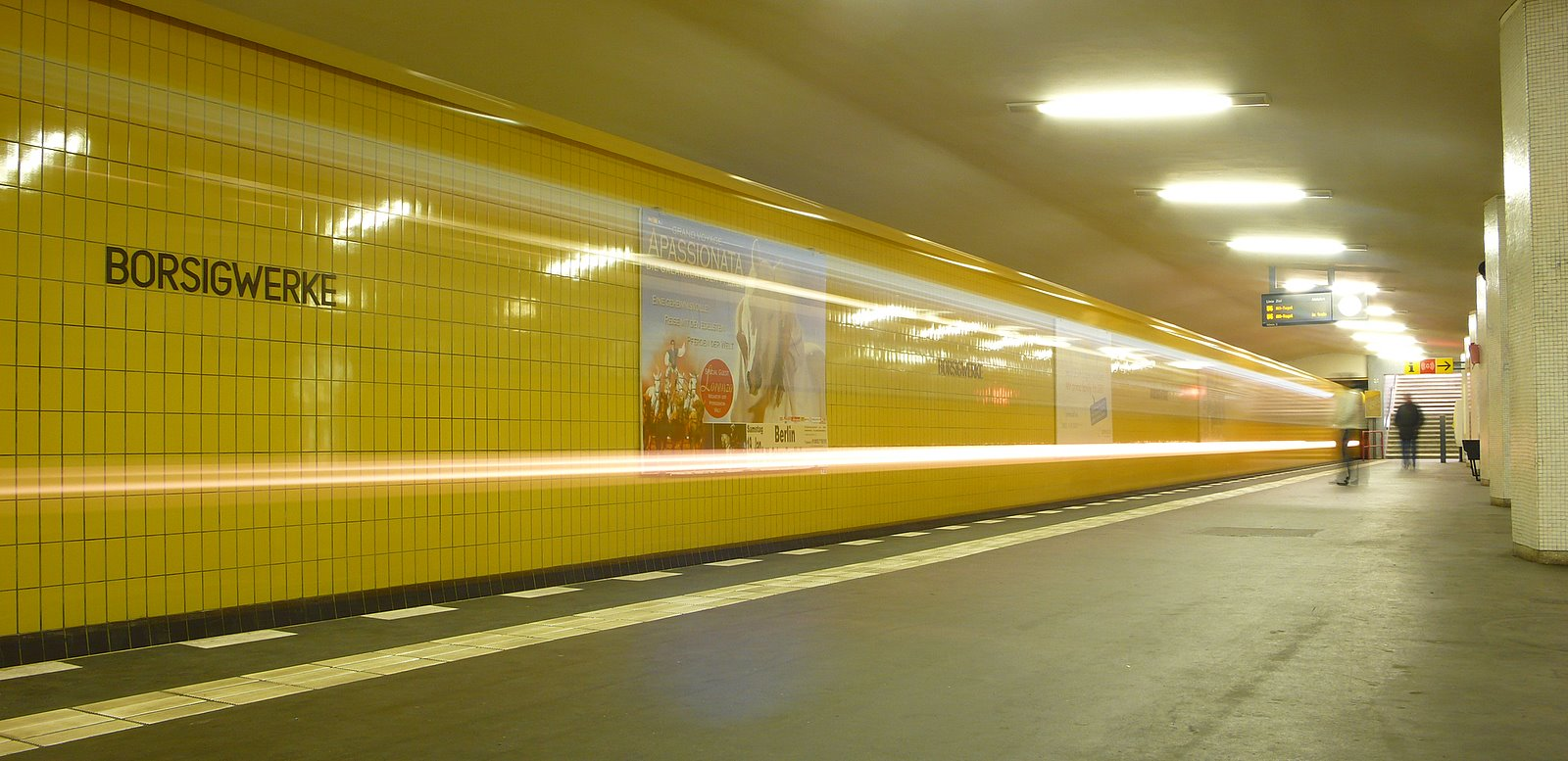
Platform with incoming train

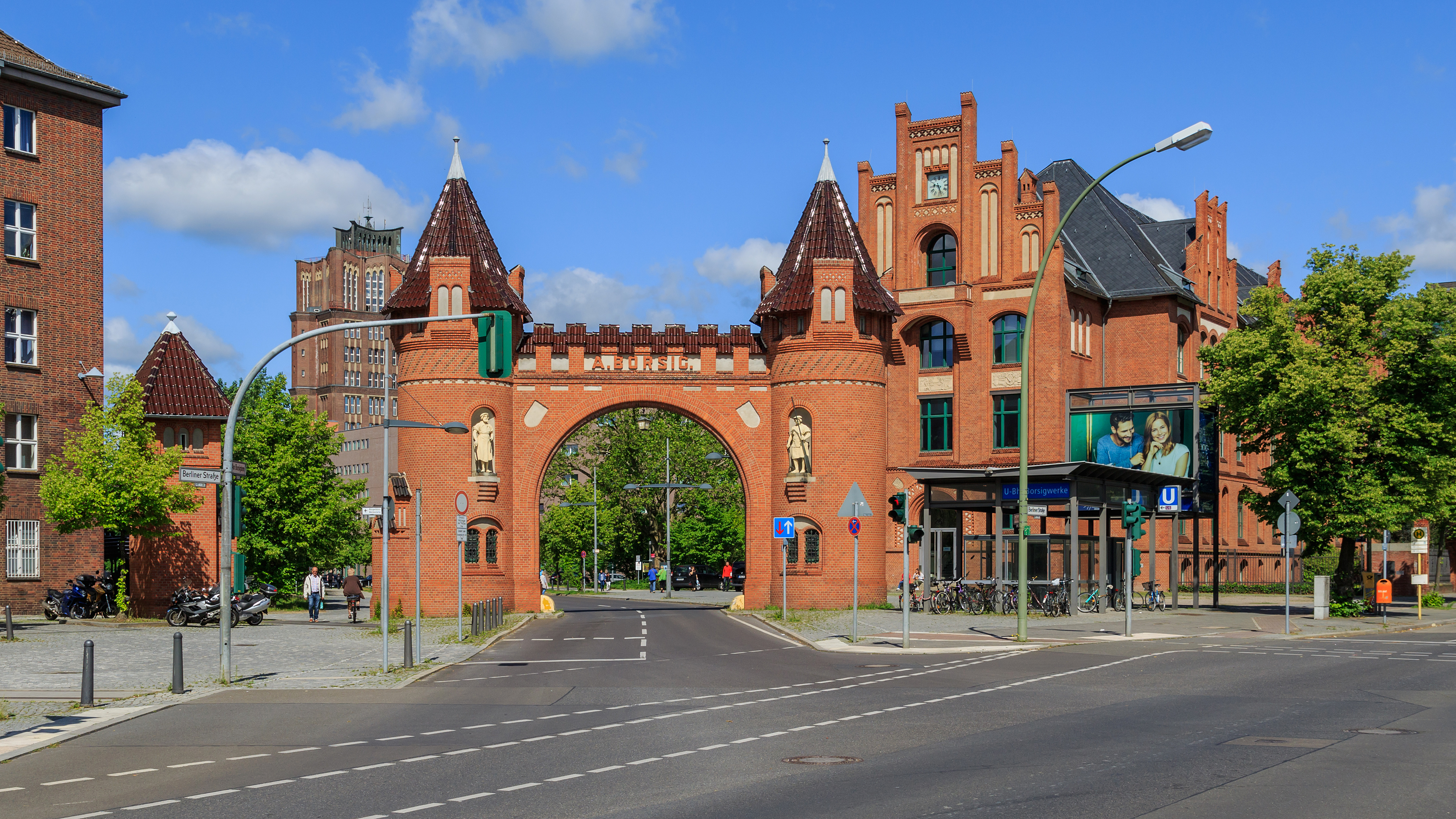
Former Borsig Factory plant

Borsigwerke is a Berlin U-Bahn station located on the U6.

This station was built by Bruno Grimmek and opened in 1958. The northern entrance was integrated into the famous brick entrance building of the Borsig Factory (German: Borsigwerke). The walls of the platform are covered with yellow tiles.

== Notes ==
Preceding station	Berlin U-Bahn	Following station
Alt-Tegel Terminus	U6	Holzhauser Straße towards Alt-Mariendorf
