= Seestraße station =

Station of the Berlin U-Bahn

Coordinates: 52.548°N 13.347°E

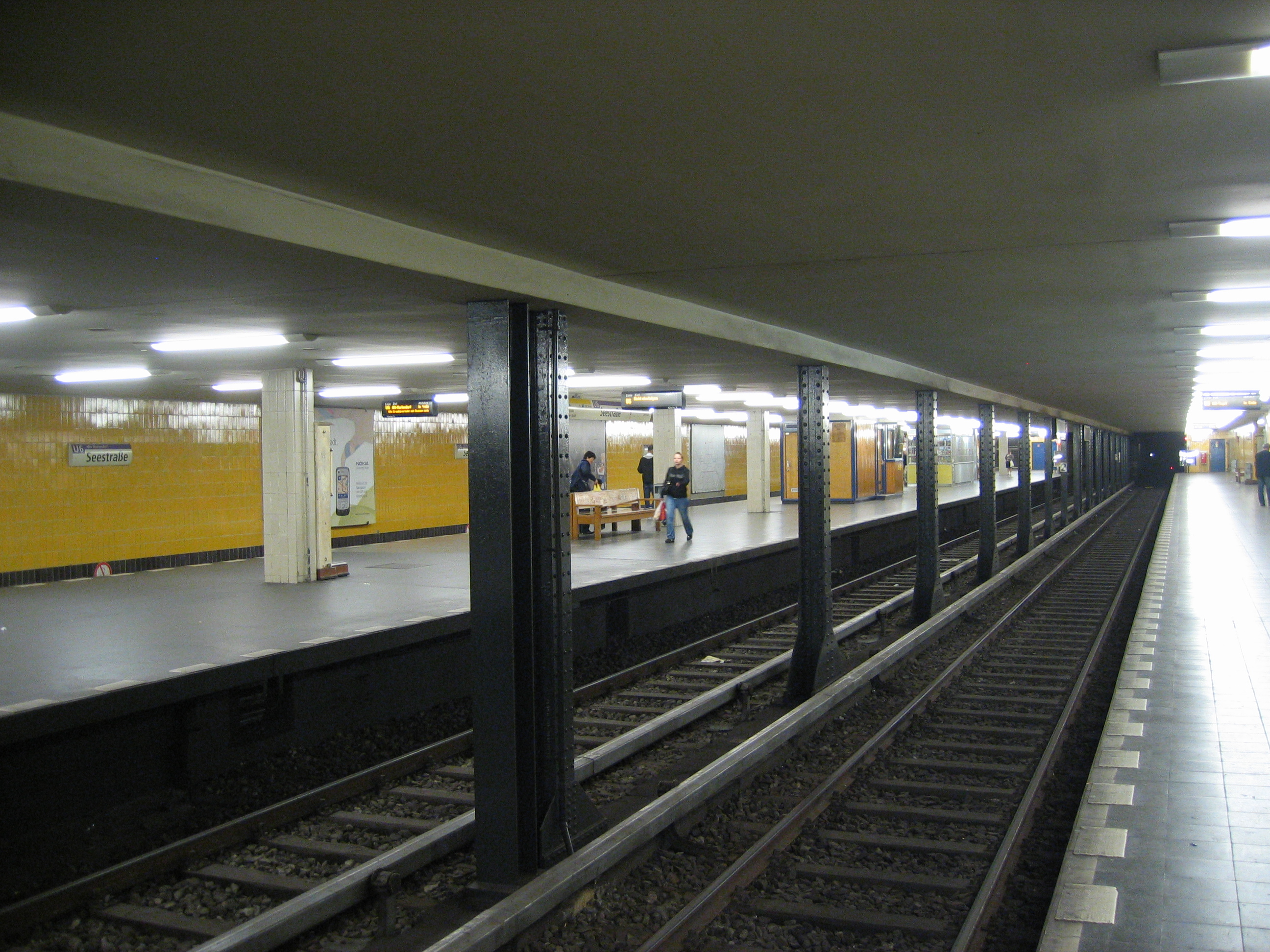
U-Bahn station Seestraße

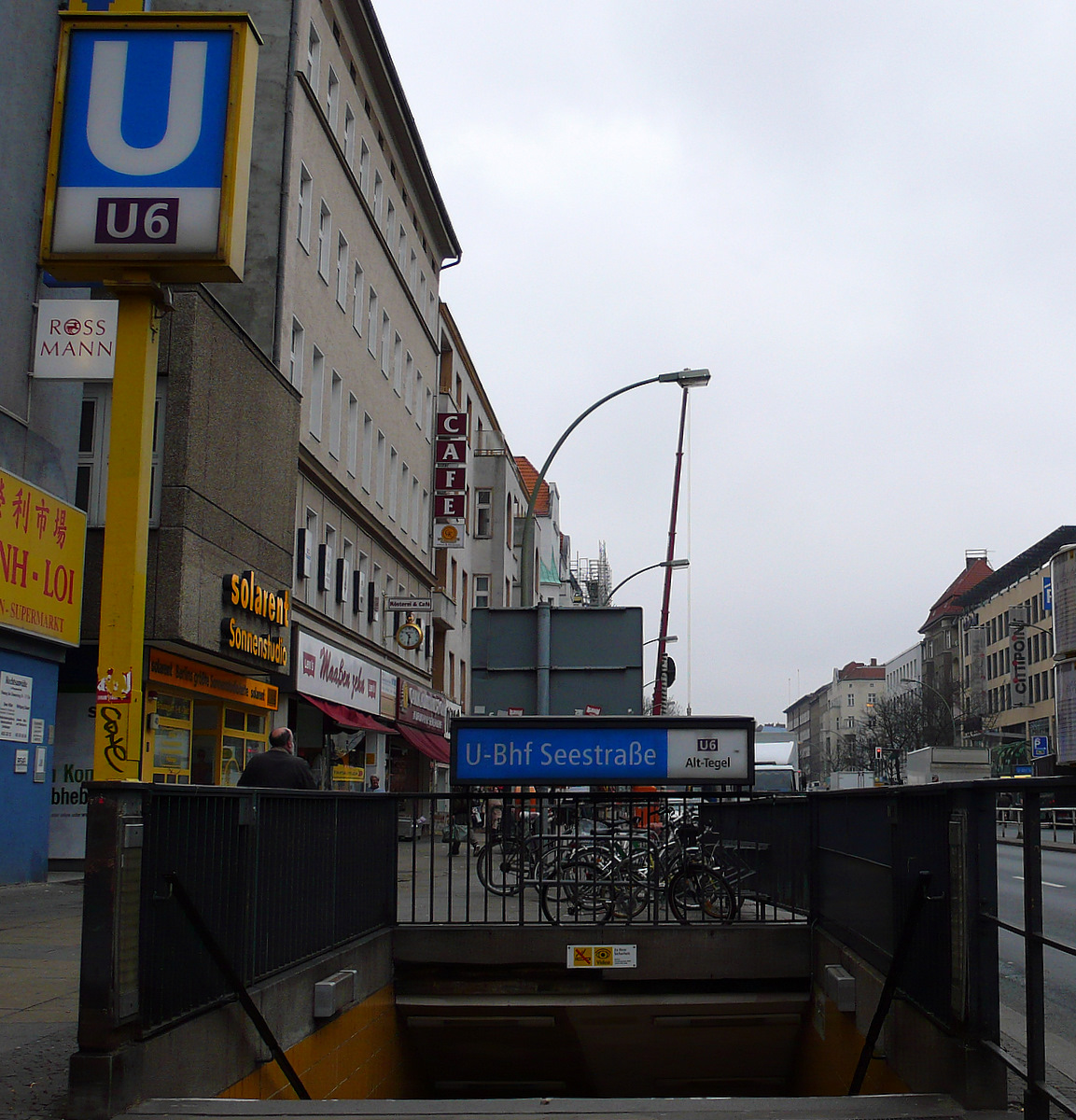
Entrance

Track diagram of the U-Bahn station Seestraße

Seestraße is a station in the Wedding district of Berlin which serves the U6 and is operated by the BVG. It lies at the busy intersection of Müllerstraße and Seestraße, which are two of Wedding's principal shopping streets and thoroughfares.

== History ==
Seestraße station first opened on 8 March 1923 (designed by Grenander/Fehse/Jennen) and was at that time the terminus of the newly built line from Stettiner Bahnhof (now Naturkundemuseum). The station consists of two platforms, the more westerly of which is an island platform with two tracks. In normal service, only the two outer tracks are used. The middle track is principally used for access to the large depot located just north of the station, but is also used for service trains which are beginning or terminating in the station. 1955 the station was renovated by B. Grimmek.

On 3/4 November 1943, a bomb hit the ceiling above the "dead" northern platform. This although this platform area was converted into an "air raid shelter". On 22 March 1944, the workshop had the heaviest destruction. Fire and total damage in the workshop area, heavy destruction in the area of the tunnel mouth, as well as in the track area. Thus, this workshop is almost completely destroyed. On 19 May 1944, Three hits in the track area and in the remains of the wagon halls, which are already largely destroyed. 44 subway cars are completely destroyed by the flames.

The U-Bahn station was at one time complemented by multiple tram as well as bus lines. The removal of tram lines in West Berlin meant that the last tram ran on 2 October 1967. However, the line running along the Seestraße was rebuilt and opened again on 25 October 1997, extended to Virchow-Klinikum. Today the station is served by two tram lines (one of which runs continuously), two bus lines during the day and three lines at night.

== Overview ==
This unusual arrangement exists because the station was the terminus of the line when it opened. A wall was originally provided between the two platforms but was later removed.

Preceding station	Berlin U-Bahn	Following station
Rehberge towards Alt-Tegel	U6	Leopoldplatz towards Alt-Mariendorf
