= Alt-Tegel station =

Station of the Berlin U-Bahn

Coordinates: 52°35′22″N 13°17′01″E

Alt-Tegel
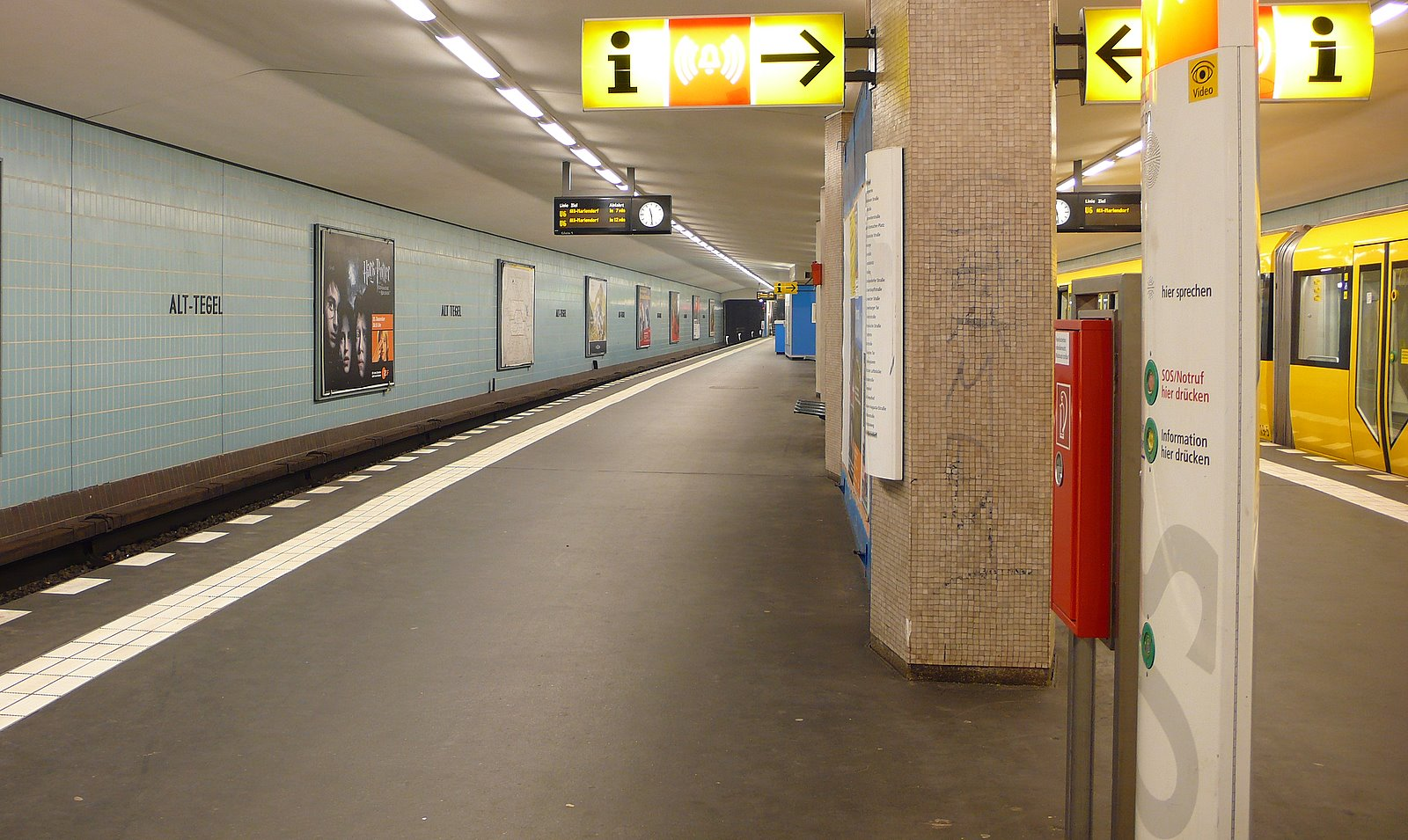
- Platform view of Alt-Tegel

General information
- Location: Reinickendorf
- Owner: Berliner Verkehrsbetriebe
- Operator: Berliner Verkehrsbetriebe
- Platforms: 1 island platform
- Tracks: 2
- Train operators: Berliner Verkehrsbetriebe

Construction
- Structure type: Underground

Other information
- Fare zone: VBB: Berlin B/5656

History
- Opened: 31 May 1958; 68 years ago

Services
| Preceding station | Berlin U-Bahn | Following station |
|---|---|---|
| Terminus | U6 | Borsigwerke towards Alt-Mariendorf |
Location
- Location within Berlin Location within Germany Location within Europe

Alt-Tegel is a Berlin U-Bahn station located on the U6.t It was constructed by B. Grimmek and opened as "Tegel" station in 1958. In 1992, the station was renamed to Alt-Tegel (Old Tegel). The S-Bahn station Berlin-Tegel is located nearly 600 meters away. The renaming of the Tegel U-Bahn station perhaps occurred to avoid confusion.

The station is located at the end of the U6 line. It has eight exits, and is an important station for people who want to go to the Tegeler See, a recreation site in Berlin.

== History ==
Even though line U6 only opened in 1923, by the 1930s there were already plans by the city of Berlin to extend the U6 to Wedding and to Tegel. Construction work for an extension began in 1929 on Müllerstraße. Due to the imminent global economic crisis and the resulting financial consequences for the city of Berlin, the work stopped. The result was a roughly 400-meter-long tunnel.

After the Second World War, the BVG planned an extensive expansion of the Berlin U-Bahn. In the first stage, line C (U6), which then ended at Grenzallee and Seestraße. Construction began for an extension to Tegel on 26 October 1953. The extension was done in two stages. First, the section Seestraße - Kurt-Schumacher-Platz, followed by the part above ground section Kurt-Schumacher-Platz - Borsigwerke then underground to Alt-Tegel. The second section included the stations Scharnweberstraße (above ground), Seidelstraße (now: Otisstraße, aboveground), Holzhauser Straße (above ground), Borsigwerke (underground) and terminus Tegel, which was also underground.

In 1995, when the S-Bahn line to Henningsdorf was reopened, the U-Bahn station was renamed Alt-Tegel to avoid confusion with the S-Bahn station Tegel .
