= Alt-Mariendorf station =

Station of the Berlin U-Bahn

Coordinates: 52°26′23″N 13°23′15″E

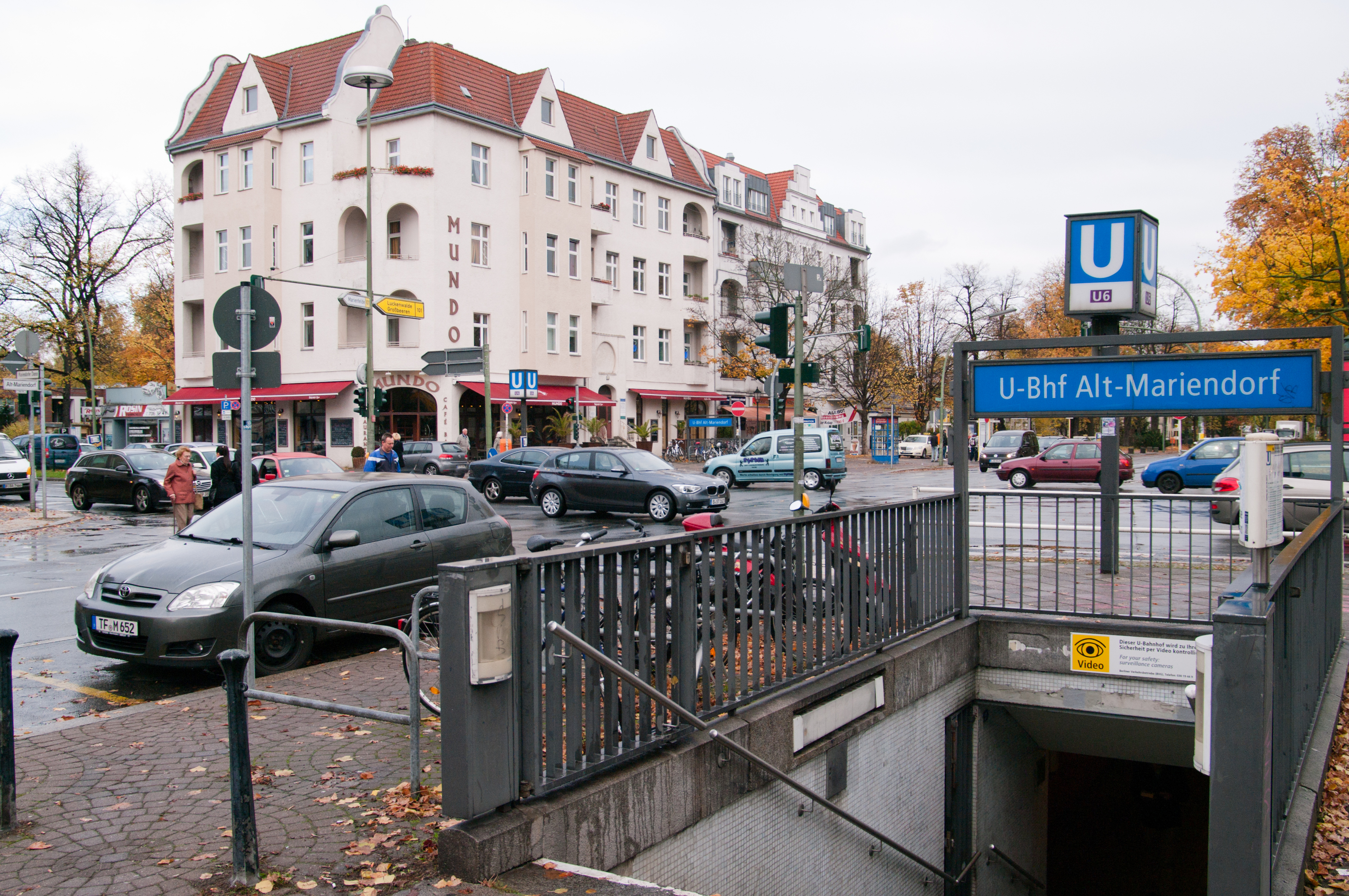
- Station entrance

General information
- System: U Bahn station

Services
Preceding station	Berlin U-Bahn	Following station
Westphalweg towards Alt-Tegel	U6	Terminus
Location

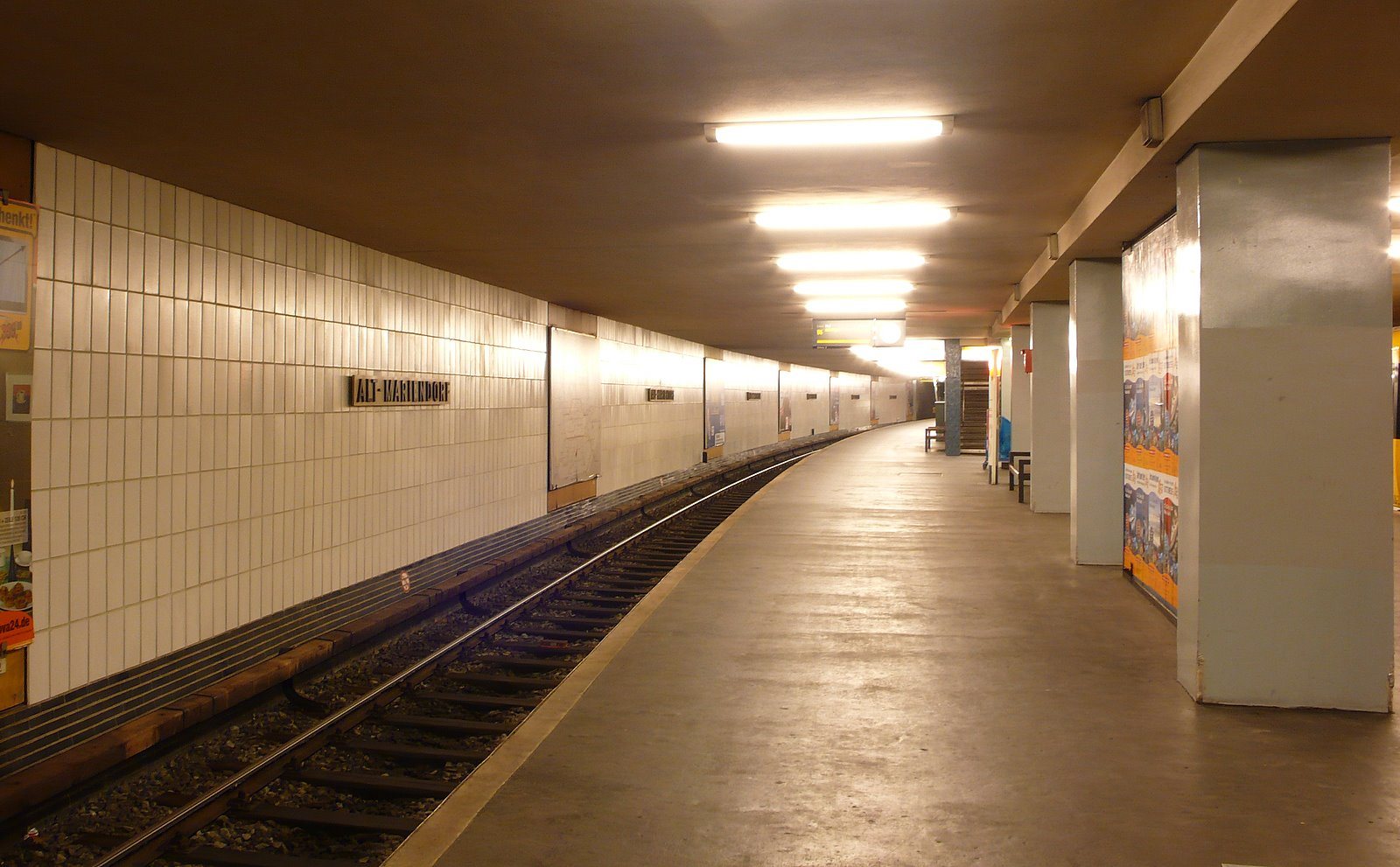
The platform of the station

Alt-Mariendorf is a Berlin U-Bahn station located on the U6 line. It serves as the current southern terminus of the line. It was opened in 1966. The architect of the station was R. G. Rümmler. The walls are covered with white tiles, and on the southern entrance, wood was used as a reference to the nearby church.

The station has a central platform with two exits. The outputs lead to two separate intermediate levels. On the southern intermediate level are three smaller shops. The underground station has one elevator between the platform and the southern intermediate level as well as the street and is therefore barrier-free . The design of the station was carried out by Rainer G. Rümmler . The walls are provided with large white ceramic tiles, while the center columns with natural stone were disguised. The opening took place on 28 February 1966 in the course of the extension of the then line C^{II} of Tempelhof (Südring) to Alt-Mariendorf instead. The day after, the line was renamed line 6.

At the end of 2018, the station was put together along with twelve other stations of West Berlin subway construction during the 1960s and 1970s under monument protection.
