= U6 (Berlin U-Bahn) =

North-south rapid transit line

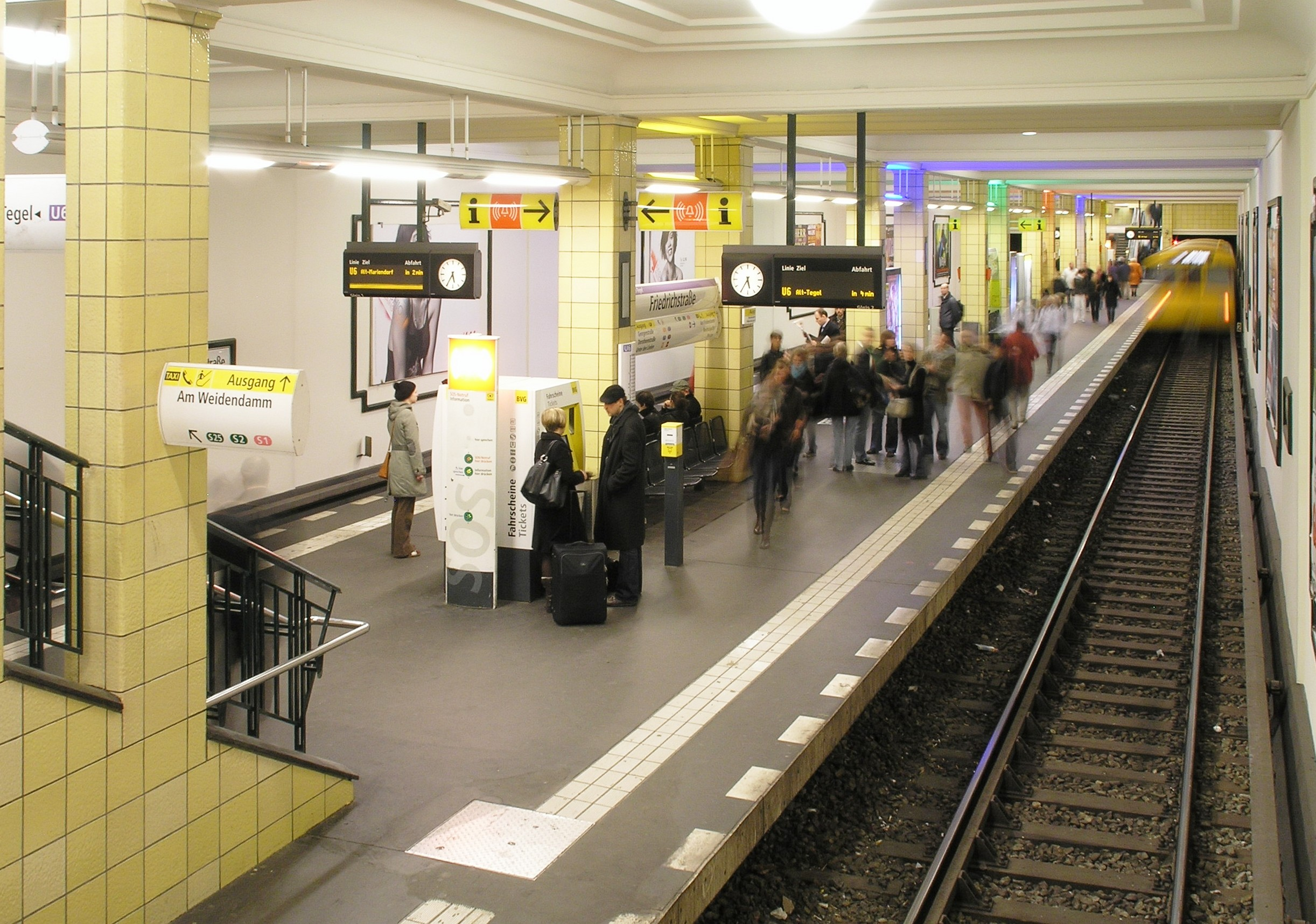
- Friedrichstraße, one of the stations on the U6

Overview
- Locale: Berlin
- Termini: Alt-Tegel; Alt-Mariendorf
- Stations: 29

Service
- Type: Rapid transit
- System: Berlin U-Bahn
- Operator: Berliner Verkehrsbetriebe
- Depots: Britz; Seestraße
- Rolling stock: F84/87/90/92; H

History
- Opened: 30 January 1923; 103 years ago (Note: From Zinnowitzer Straße (now Naturkundemuseum) to Hallesches Tor)
- Last extension: 28 February 1966 (Note: From Tempelhof to Alt-Mariendorf)

Technical
- Line length: 19.9 km (12.4 mi)
- Track gauge: 1,435 mm (4 ft 8 1/2 in) standard gauge
- Loading gauge: Großprofil
- Electrification: 750 V DC third rail (bottom running)
Route map
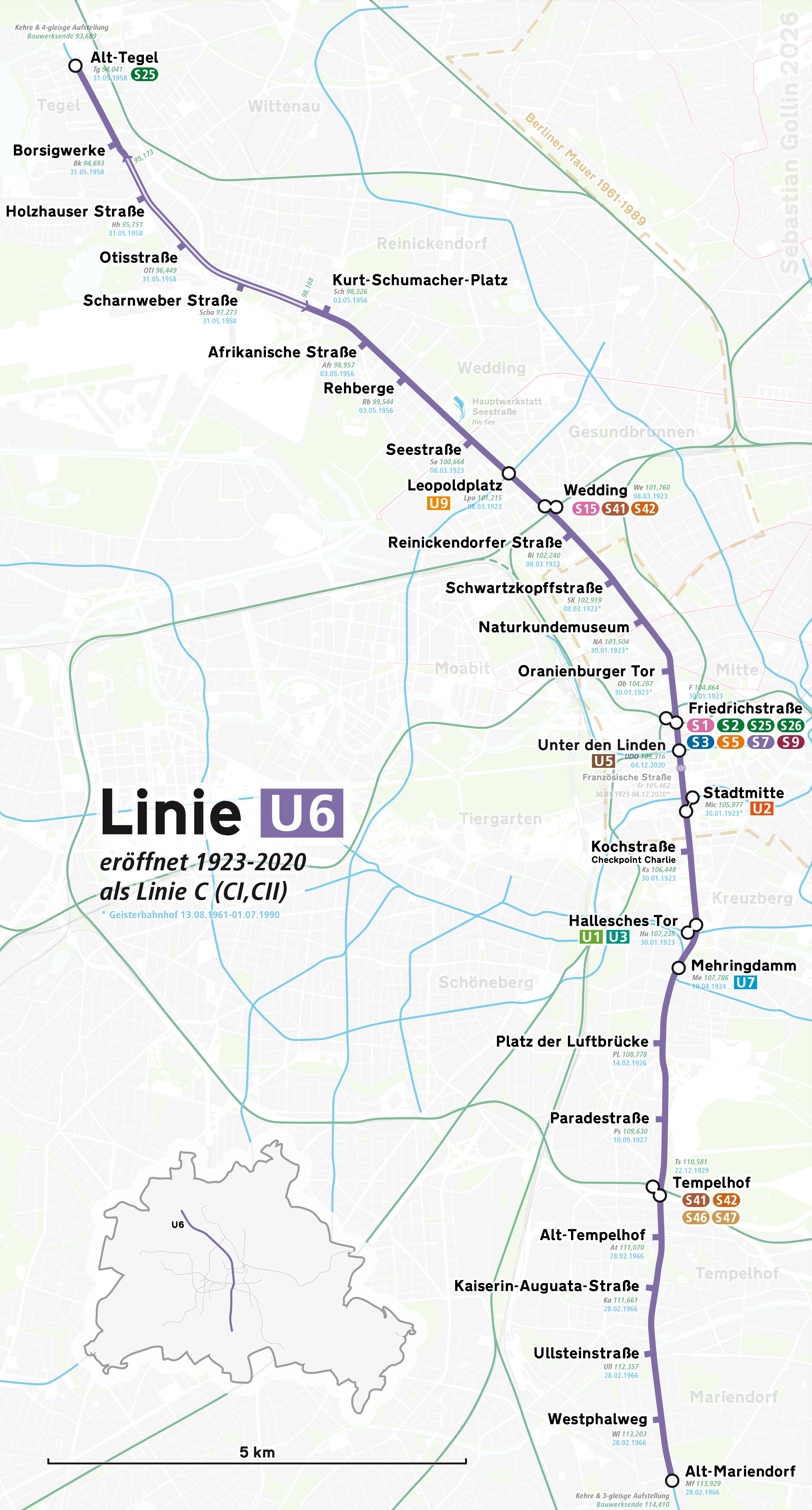
- (*) Under reconstruction until 2025

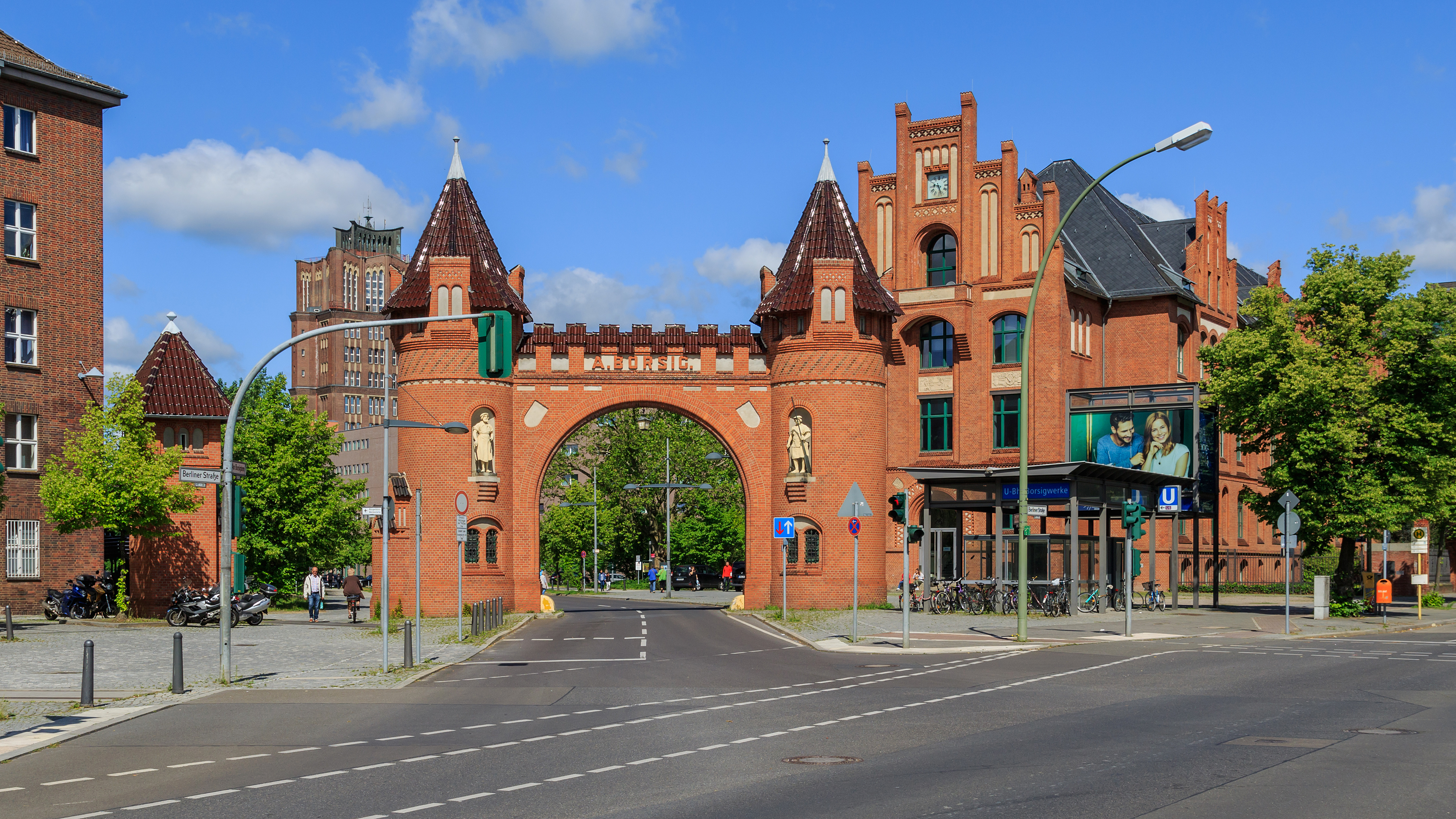
Entrance to the Borsigwerke station

U6 is a 19.9 km (12.4 mi) long rapid transit line on the Berlin U-Bahn with 29 stations. It runs in a north-south direction from the Berlin locality of Tegel in the north via Friedrichstraße to Mariendorf, a locality in the southern part of the city. It is one of the five large profile ("Großprofil") lines.

During the Cold War, both U6 termini were in the former West Berlin but the line passed under East Berlin for a short section of its route. Five of its stations were sealed off by East German authorities and the trains went through these so-called “ghost stations” without stopping, while a sixth, Friedrichstraße, remained open primarily as a transfer station between the U6 and the S-Bahn lines using the north-south S-Bahn tunnel, but also as an official border crossing between East and West Berlin.

It was formerly named "C^{I}" from 1923 to 1928.

== Current routing ==
U6 begins its journey from its northern terminus in central Tegel, first running in a southeasterly direction underground along the path of Berliner Straße to the Borsigwerke station, after which it surfaces to run on an embankment beside Seidelstraße and Scharnweberstraße. Just after the Scharnweberstraße station it enters a tunnel and continues under Müllerstraße (which becomes Chausseestraße and then Friedrichstraße). From this point it runs in a distinctly southerly direction. After Mehringplatz at the Hallesches Tor station, U6 crosses under the Landwehr Canal and swings slightly westwards to run parallel to Mehringdamm, which changes its name to Tempelhofer Damm at the Platz der Luftbrücke station, and then to Mariendorfer Damm after crossing the Teltow Canal. U6 crosses this canal in a conduit attached to and immediately below the road-traffic bridge. The line ends at the intersection of Reisseckstraße, Friedenstraße and Mariendorfer Damm at its terminus, the Alt-Mariendorf station.

== History ==
=== Beginnings ===
As early as 1901 the city of Berlin had plans for a subway running from north to south under Friedrichstraße. Werner von Siemens also had plans for a line under that impressive street, but at the time the city decided the transport system should be in public hands and began construction of the so-called North-South Line from Wedding to Tempelhof, with a branch to Neukölln. This work was delayed and finally abandoned due to difficulties associated with World War I. Relics of this early phase up to 1918 can still be found in the rolled-steel support pillars at the Oranienburger Tor station, still bearing the trade name of the supplying rolling mill, Rombach in Alsace-Lorraine.

The North-South line (now U6/U7) showing its name and extent in 1930

In 1919 work was resumed, but during the post-war hyperinflation period the filling in of the already existing tunnel was proposed in 1921. However it was decided to continued construction after all, and on 30 January 1923 the first tunnel section was opened between Hallesches Tor and Stettiner Bahnhof (the latter going by the name of Naturkundemuseum station since 13 December 2009, replacing the name Zinnowitzer Straße station). A northwest extension was opened on 8 March 1923 between Stettiner Bahnhof and Seestraße, with a maintenance workshop being built at the Seestraße station.

At the junction of Mohrenstraße and Friedrichstraße, two subway lines intersected for the first time: the city’s North-South Line, renamed Line C, and the private Central Line (Centrumsline). But as the concept of a tower station (accommodating two lines stacked one above the other) was not well known, the city of Berlin built its own station, named Leipziger Straße (now Stadtmitte), 160 metres (524 ft 11 in) from the Central Line station. The result is that passengers transferring between the two lines still today have to walk through a long connecting pedestrian tunnel, popularly known by Berliners as the “mouse route” ("Mäusetunnel").

At Belle-Alliance Straße (now named Mehringdamm) where the line separated into two branches, three tracks were built. From the western track (side platform), trains ran to both termini, Tempelhof and Neukölln; the central platform was used for trains heading downtown, the middle track for those coming from Neukölln and the eastern track for trains coming from Tempelhof. In the course of constructing the U7 line, the station was completely redesigned and is now called Mehringdamm.

Due to disputes with the administrative district of Tempelhof, the first route to be built was the branch to Neukölln. Work on the other branch only began in 1924, but just two years later, on 14 February 1926, the stretch from Belle-Alliance-Straße to Kreuzberg (now the Platz der Luftbrücke station) was opened. A year later this second branch extended to Tempelhof Airport (now the Paradestraße station). This now-closed airport was located to the east of the U6 track.

In 1929 the line was extended to intersect with the S-Bahn’s Tempelhof station on the circle line (Ringbahn). A large ticket hall was erected for both S- and U-Bahn passengers. Since the station had to be built very deep to accommodate the subway line, there was room for a spacious ticket hall.

=== The northern extension ===
Even as construction of the North-South/C Line began there were plans to extend it to Berlin-Tegel, and 400 metres (1,300 ft) of tunnel had been prepared by 1929. This extension from the existing Seestraße station to the center of Tegel made several bus and tram lines redundant and for that reason this stretch was the first to be worked on after the war in the western part of the city.

The first pile was driven on 26 October 1953 at Müllerstraße north of the Seestraße station. The 6.9 km (4.3 mi) stretch was built in two sections:

- Seestraße to Kurt-Schumacher-Platz
- Kurt-Schumacher-Platz to Tegel

For reasons of cost and because of a very high water table there, north of Kurt-Schumacher-Platz it was decided to put the track on an embankment instead of in a cutting. A ramp raises the track 15 metres (49 ft 3 in) to an embankment and onward to Berlin’s first above-ground station for large profile cars, the Scharnweberstraße station. After passing the Holzhauser Straße station on this northwestern stretch, the tracks return underground, following the course of Berliner Straße to the center of Berlin-Tegel.

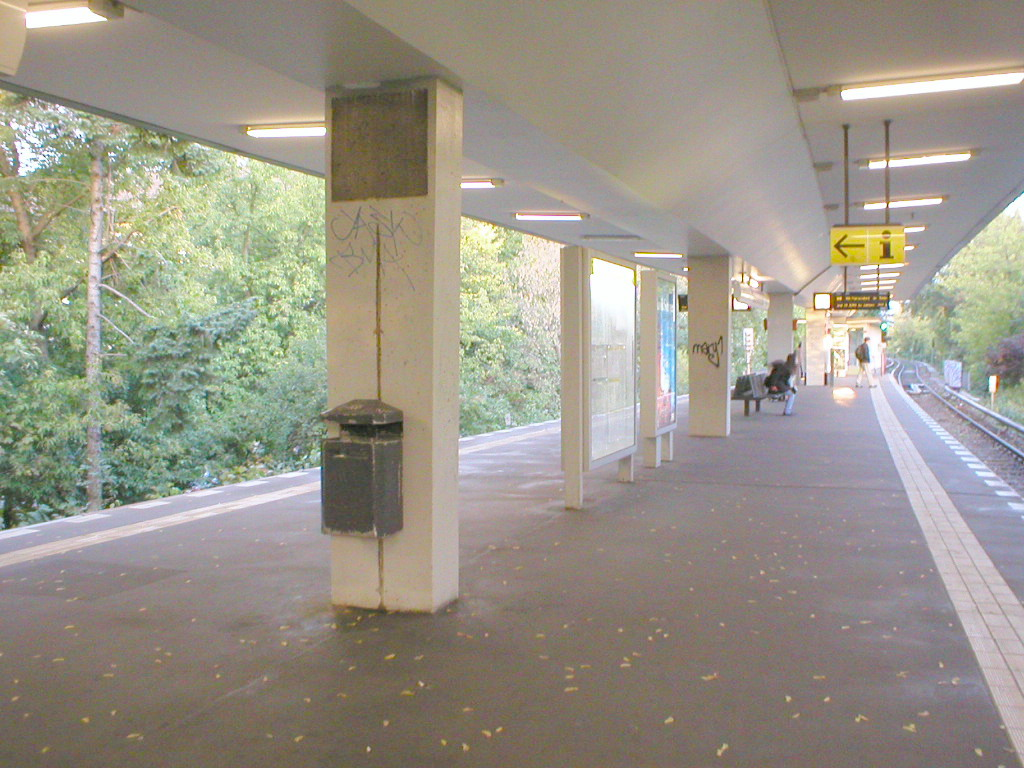
The embankment station at Scharnweberstraße

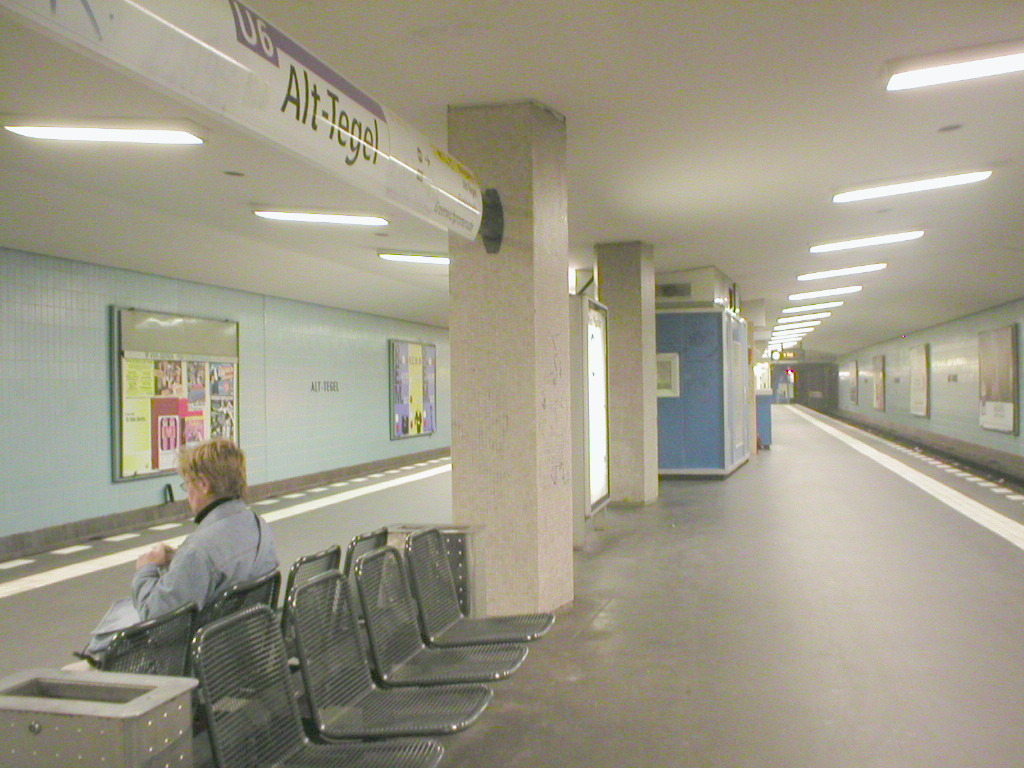
The underground northern terminus of U6, Alt-Tegel (formerly Tegel)

As was the case before World War II, the stations had a very functional design with its surfaces covered with bright, pastel-colored ceramic tiles. The embankment stations were built of reinforced concrete, which was typical for the time. Nowadays this gives them a very bulky appearance so they do not radiate the charm of many of the suburban stations, such as those on the U3 line to the south.

A first section was opened on 3 May 1956, the second on 31 May 1958. With the opening of the C Line the northern Berlin Transport Company (BVG) network was completely restructured and numerous tram lines in this area could be eliminated.

=== "Ghost stations" ===
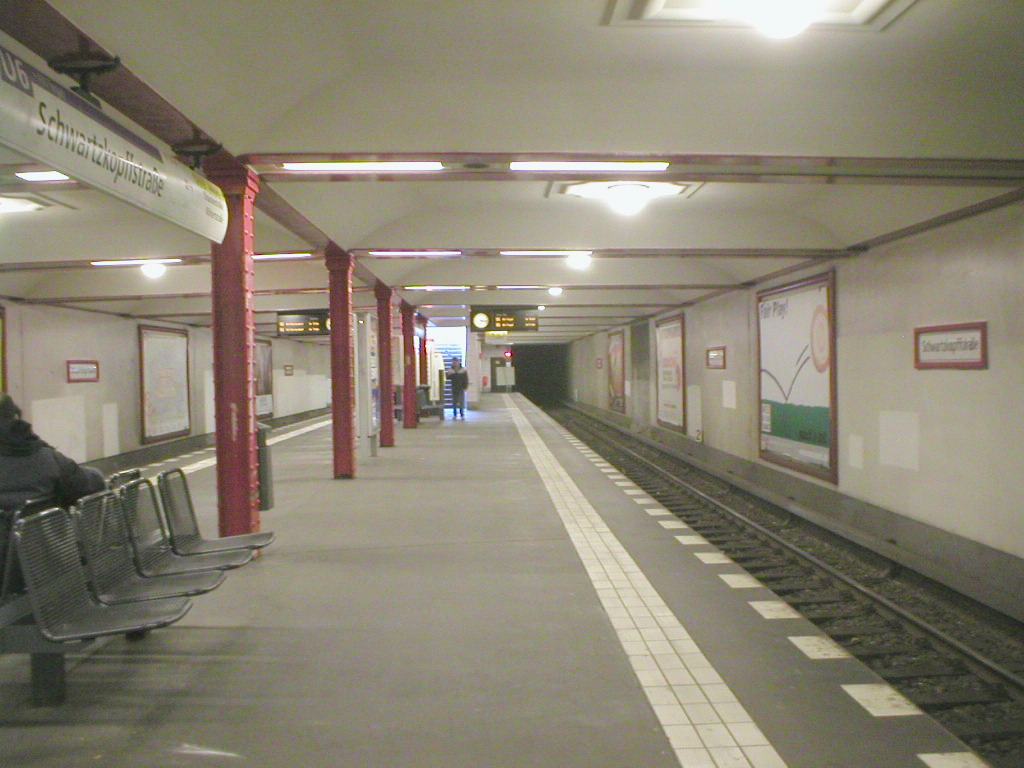
The Schwartzkopffstraße station in 2004. It was one of the “ghost stations” closed from 1961 to 1990

After the construction of the Berlin Wall in 1961, on the orders of German Democratic Republic interior minister Karl Maron all U6 stations inside East Berlin were closed to passenger traffic, except for the Friedrichstraße station. At that station, West-Berlin passengers could transfer to the S-Bahn or enter East Berlin via the established border crossing there. This order turned all remaining closed stations into so-called "ghost stations", through which trains were required to pass without stopping and which could only be entered by East German border and traffic policemen.

To service the area formerly accessible to the East Berlin population via the U6, until the ghost stations were reopened a bus line 59 was established between the Walter Ulbricht-Stadium, later renamed World Youth Stadium (Stadion der Weltjugend), and Leipziger Straße. The ghost stations did not appear on East German city maps. They were successively renovated and opened between 11 November 1989, around the fall of the Berlin Wall (U8 Jannowitzbrücke station) and 1 July 1990, the date of German customs reunification (the last U6 stations to open were Stadion der Weltjugend/Schwartzkopfstraße., Nordbahnhof/Naturkundenmuseum, Oranienburger Tor, Französische Straße and Stadtmitte).

A cold war curiosity: Schwartzkopffstraße station, renamed Walter-Ulbricht Stadion in April 1951 after the newly built sports field, was one of the five U6 ghost stations. Nevertheless, on 15 March, the 1973 East Berlin authorities did not hesitate to rename the underground station which had been deserted for eleven years Stadion der Weltjugend – the signs with the station name visible only to (mostly West-Berlin) subway passengers as their train passed through the station.

=== Completion of line 6 ===
As with the northern extension to Tegel, ever since construction of Line C began it was planned to extend it to Alt-Mariendorf as the southern terminus. The Nazis had planned to extend the line even further south to the Mariendorf horse race track (Trabrennbahn Mariendorf). When work on the long-awaited extension began, there were debates about the cost and it was, for example, proposed to lay the track in a cutting next to the Tempelhofer Damm/Mariendorf Damm roads. The public transport company BVG objected, arguing that easy access to the Tempelhof municipal offices (Rathaus Tempelhof) and the main shopping street would only be possible with an underground line.

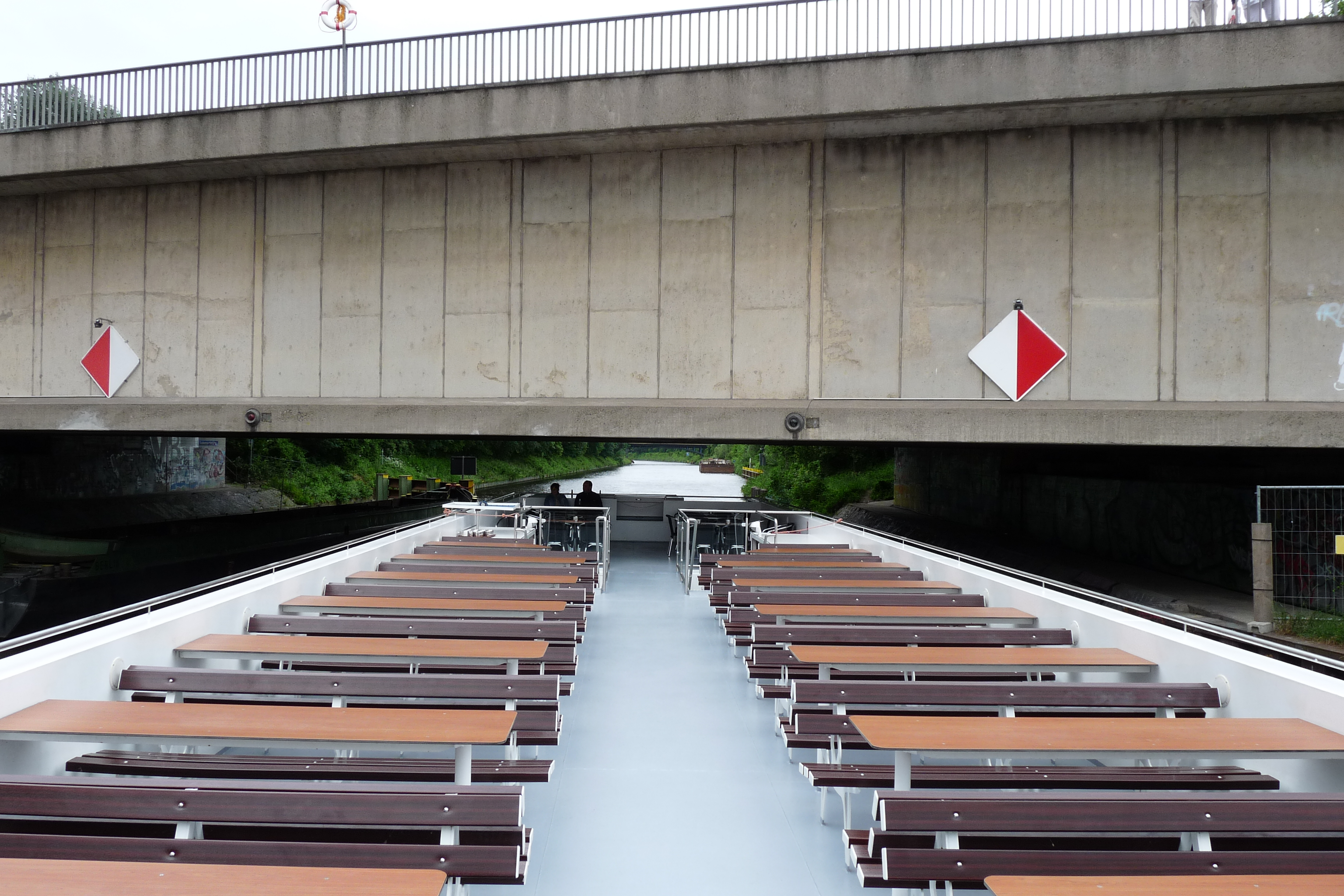
Trimodal transport at the Teltow Canal near the Ullsteinstraße station: road vehicles, U-Bahn conduit and canal sightseeing barge

The first pile for the 3.5-kilometre (2.2 mi) route was driven on 6 March 1961 and the Alt-Mariendorf terminus station was opened on 28 February 1966. The route is from the S-and U-Bahn station Tempelhof straight south along the Tempelhofer Damm to the Teltow canal. Similar to the construction of today’s U7 line to Rudow, the canal posed the biggest problem for the track in this area and an unusual solution was found. The U6 tracks are contained in a construction underneath and connected to the lower part of the road traffic bridge over the canal. The side with the northbound rail was built with enough space for the Ullsteinstraße station. Since the canal shipping required a vertical clearance of 4.6 metres (15 ft 1 in), ramps were built to raise the road 1.2 metres (3 ft 11 in) above its original level.

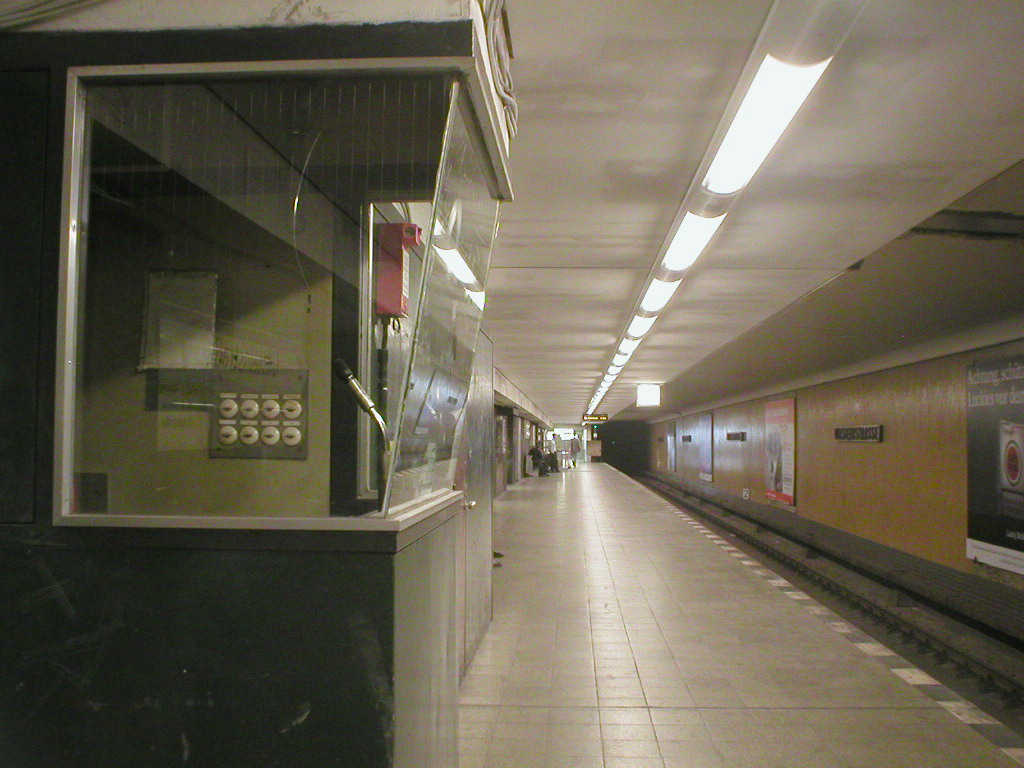
Ullsteinstraße station

South of the Teltow Canal the U6 follows Mariendorfer Damm to the terminus station Alt-Mariendorf, which was built at the junction of the roads Reißeckstraße/Friedensstraße and Mariendorfer Damm. From here, several bus routes service the sparsely developed surroundings. This expansion completed the U6 line. Further extensions are not planned.

Except for the Alt-Tempelhof station, all stations were designed by the architect Rainer G. Rümmler. As with the southern part of the U7 line, he used large rectangular ceramic tiles to surface the station walls.

=== Reopening ===
Station restoration and modification of the platforms and tunnels was started after the fall of the Berlin Wall, and all the former “ghost stations” had been opened by 1 July 1990.

When the U6 was built between 1912 and 1923, money was scarce because of World War I and the subsequent hyperinflation period, and the tight budgetary situation of the city of Berlin as the owner of the new North-South line did not leave much of a financial margin. The stations for the small-profile trains, built earlier, had been more attractively designed, whereas the U6 merely had white plaster finishing. The only distinguishing feature for each station was a characteristic color for the columns and station signs. The length of the platforms was also reduced. Lengths of 110–120 metres (360 ft 11 in – 393 ft 8 in) were customary for the platforms built later, but at that time only 80-metre (262 ft 6 in) platforms were constructed. Already in the 1970s the first capacity problems arose because only four-car trains could be accommodated on these platforms. Therefore, in the 1960s and 1970s the West Berlin subway stations were modified to extend the platforms so longer trains could be used. But since modification of the U6’s three border stations, Friedrichstraße, Kochstraße and Reinckendorfer Straße, was either not possible or would have involved paying a considerable sum of money to East Germany, and since the trains did not even stop at the 5 “ghost stations”, only four-car trains could be operated on the U6 line. As compensation, the trains arrived at 3-minute intervals during rush hours.

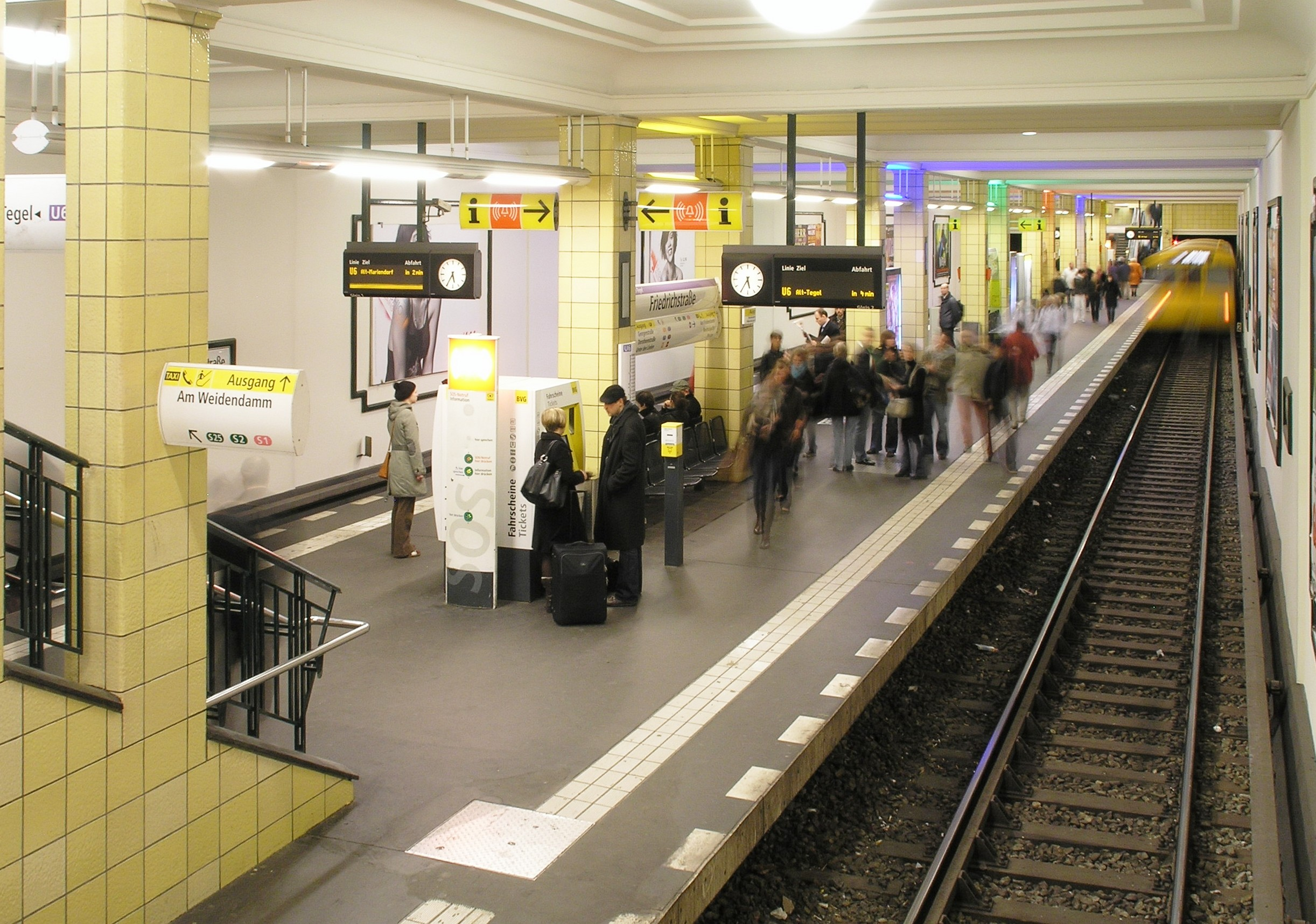
The Friedrichstraße station needed longer platforms, and the difficult solution due to space restrictions causes inevitable congestion during rush hours

In order to provide six-car trains to handle the traffic after German reunification in 1990, the Berlin Senate allocated 250 million DM to extend the platforms of the northern stations Schwartzkopffstraße and Reinickendorfer Straße, and the southern stations Kochstraße, Stadtmitte, Französische Straße, Friedrichstraße, Oranienburger Tor, and Zinnowitzer Straße (today Naturkundemuseum), The modifications took four years - from July 1992 to September 1996 – without service interruption in various stations:

- Oranienburger Tor - modified from July 27, 1992 to April 1994
- Friedrichstraße - modified from September 1992 to June 1995
- Reinickendorfer Straße - modified from July 1993 to October 1995
- Kochstraße - modified from October 1993 to January 1996
- Stadtmitte and Franzöische Straße - modified from 1994 to 29 September 1996
- Zinnowitzer Straße and Schwartzkopffstraße - modified from 1995 to 29 September 1996

=== Recent service changes ===
The extension of the U5 line from Alexanderplatz to Brandenburger Tor includes a station Unter den Linden at Friedrichstraße, offering an opportunity to transfer to the U6 line. This construction work required a discontinuation of service between the Friedrichstraße and Französische Straße stations between July 2012 and October 2013, and the closure of Französische Straße station when the U5 extension opened on 4 December 2020, due to the close proximity of the new station to Französische Straße.

The northern part of the U6, between Kurt-Schumacher-Platz and Alt-Tegel, is currently closed from 7 November 2022 until Spring 2025: this long-term blockade was implemented to allow the reconstruction of the overground section, which includes replacing a concrete bridge over Seidelstraße (coordinates: 52.5681°N 13.3076°E).

== Plans for the future ==
In the old 200 km (120 mi) plans it was known that U6 will be extended to Hennigsdorf, Lichterfelde-Sud and Teltow Stadt.

The southern U6 extension goes from Alt-Mariendorf, Trabrennbahn Mariendorf, Tauernallee, Marienfelde Süd, Goethestraße, Barnetstraße and towards Alt-Lichtenrade.

For a feasibility study from 2020, a possible branch route to today's Berlin-Tegel airport or the future technology location Urban Tech Republic was examined. A replacement variant, "U65", a length of 2.9–4.4 kilometres (1.8–2.7 mi) is achieved, depending on the variant of the U6 threading. The cost estimates are between 275 million and 607 million euros. Two variants ran out on an elevated railway. If it is expanded as a tunnel, operations on the U6 would have to be restricted for longer. An estimate of the demand is only available for one of the five variants: 15,000 passengers per day. At the moment, U5 extension is being separated into U65 and tram links respectively.

== Frequency ==
Trains were running at 4-min intervals during peak periods and 5-min intervals during off-peak periods. Weekend night service was introduced in 2003 and it is running at 15-minute frequency.
