= Bismarckstraße station =

Berlin U-Bahn station

Bismarckstraße
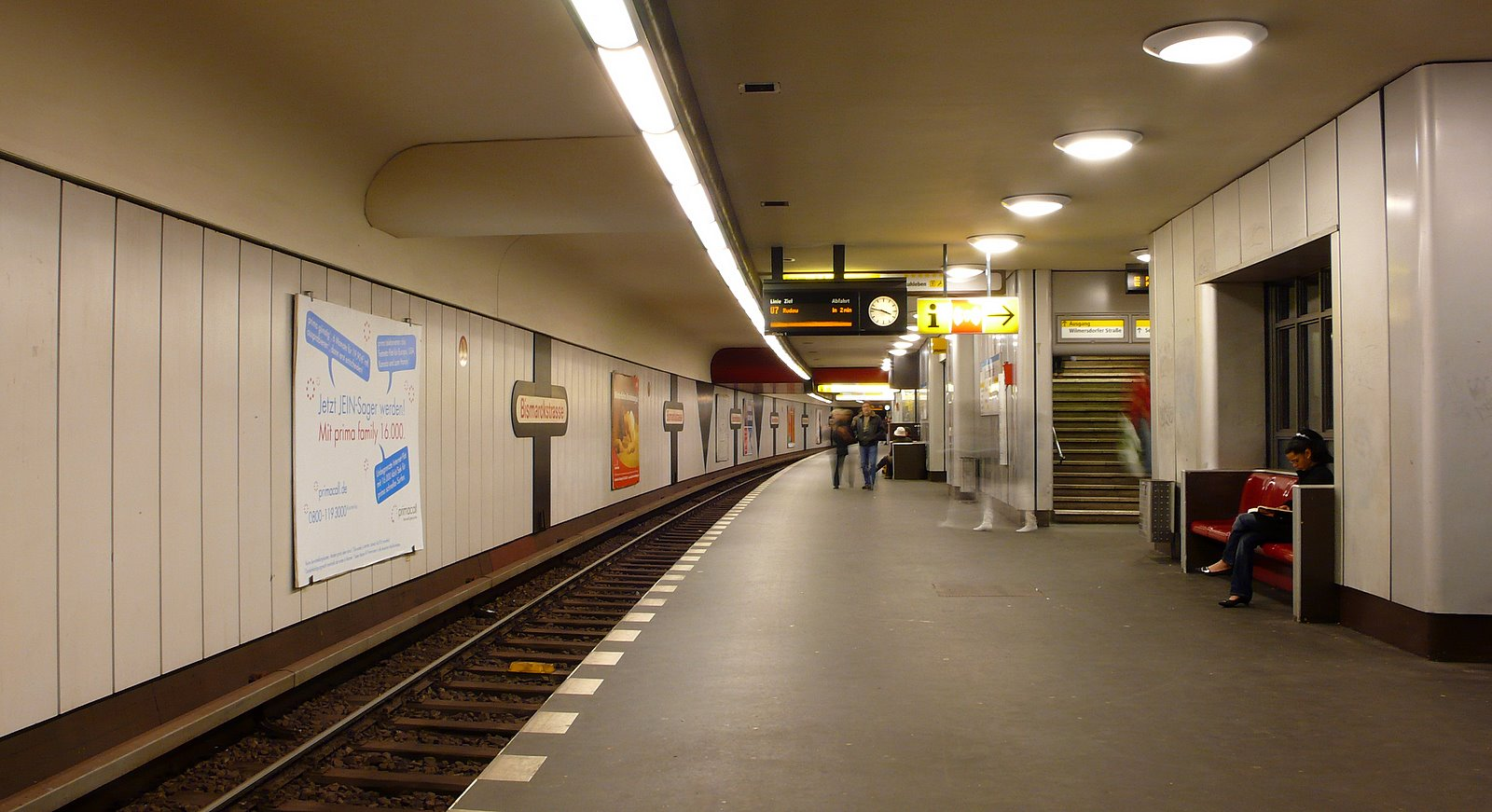
- U7 platform

General information
- Location: Bismarckstraße/Wilmersdorfer Straße; Charlottenburg, Berlin; Germany
- Coordinates: 52°30′41″N 13°18′17″E
- Owner: Berliner Verkehrsbetriebe
- Operator: Berliner Verkehrsbetriebe
- Platforms: 2 side platforms (U2); 1 island platform (U7)
- Tracks: 4 (2 on each level)
- Connections: : N2, N7

Construction
- Structure type: Underground
- Cycle facilities: Yes
- Accessible: Yes

Other information
- Fare zone: : Berlin A/5555

History
- Opened: 28 April 1978; 48 years ago

Services
Preceding station	Berlin U-Bahn	Following station
Sophie-Charlotte-Platz towards Ruhleben	U2	Deutsche Oper towards Pankow
Richard-Wagner-Platz towards Rathaus Spandau	U7	Wilmersdorfer Straße towards Rudow
Location
- Location within Berlin Location within Germany Location within Europe

Bismarckstraße is a Berlin U-Bahn station on lines U2 and U7, located in the Charlottenburg district. It was opened in 1978 on the eponymous street, a major arterial road named after Otto von Bismarck.

== History ==
At the time when the first U-Bahn line (Stammstrecke) opened in 1902, the road was laid out in a lavish boulevard style as the western continuation of Charlottenburger Chaussee (now Straße des 17. Juni) and part of a direct connection between the Berlin city centre at Brandenburg Gate to the western suburbs of Charlottenburg and Spandau along Kaiserdamm and Heerstraße. On 14 December 1902, Knie station opened at present-day Ernst-Reuter-Platz; the western extension to Bismarckstraße (now Deutsche Oper) and the Wilhelmplatz (now Richard-Wagner-Platz) terminus near Charlottenburg Town Hall was inaugurated on 14 May 1906.

On 29 March 1908, the western continuation of the present-day U2 to Reichskanzlerplatz (now Theodor-Heuss-Platz) in Westend was opened. It branched off at Bismarckstraße, which remained the original name of present-day Deutsche Oper station until 1929. Today's Bismarckstraße station, located about 380 m (1,250 ft) to the west, was not built along the U2 until the 1970s, when the construction of the new U7 line from Fehrbelliner Platz to Richard-Wagner-Platz (formerly Wilhelmplatz) required a two-level station at the intersection.

The old tunnel at the site was completely rebuilt as a reinforced concrete construction, with the new U7 tunnel running under it in a north-south direction. The station was opened with the new U7 section on 28 April 1978.

Bismarckstraße station is currently undergoing an overall refurbishment.
