= Konstanzer Straße station =

Station of the Berlin U-Bahn

Konstanzer Straße
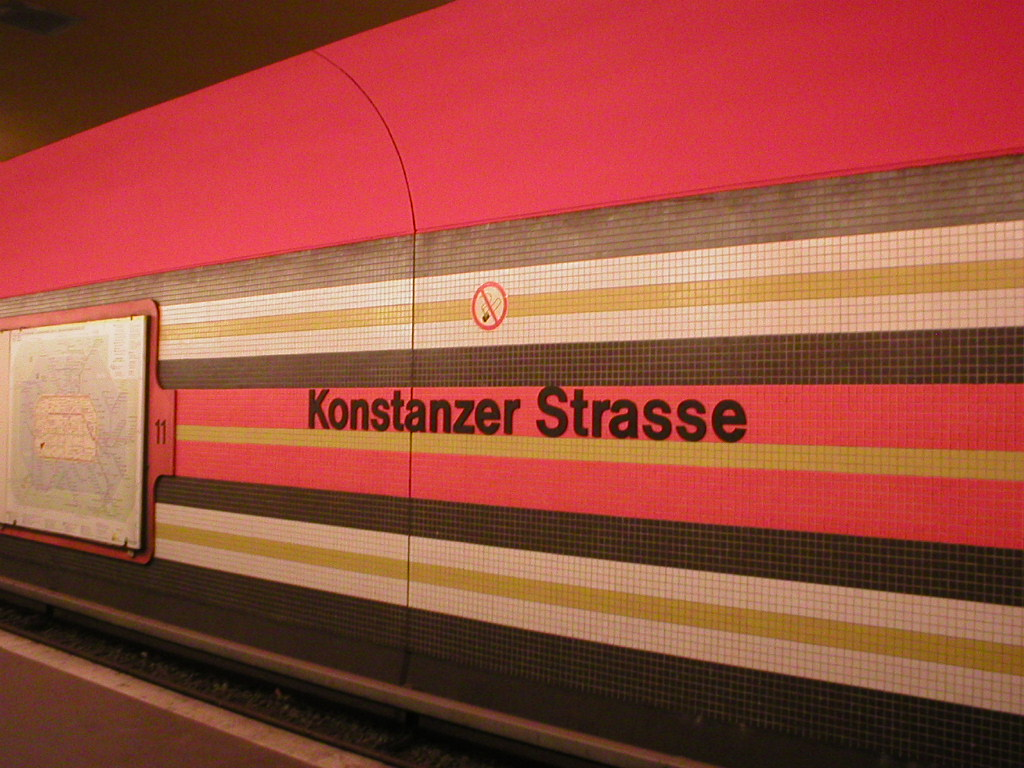
- U-Bahn station Konstanzer Straße

General information
- Coordinates: 52°29′39″N 13°18′34″E
- System: Berlin U-Bahn station
- Owner: BVG
- Line: U7
- Platforms: 1
- Tracks: 2
- Connections: 101, N7

Construction
- Structure type: Underground

Other information
- Station code: Kn
- Fare zone: VBB: Berlin A/5555

History
- Opened: 28 April 1978

Services
Preceding station	Berlin U-Bahn	Following station
Adenauerplatz towards Rathaus Spandau	U7	Fehrbelliner Platz towards Rudow
Location

Konstanzer Straße (English: Constance Street) is a Berlin U-Bahn station located on line U7 in the Wilmersdorf district.

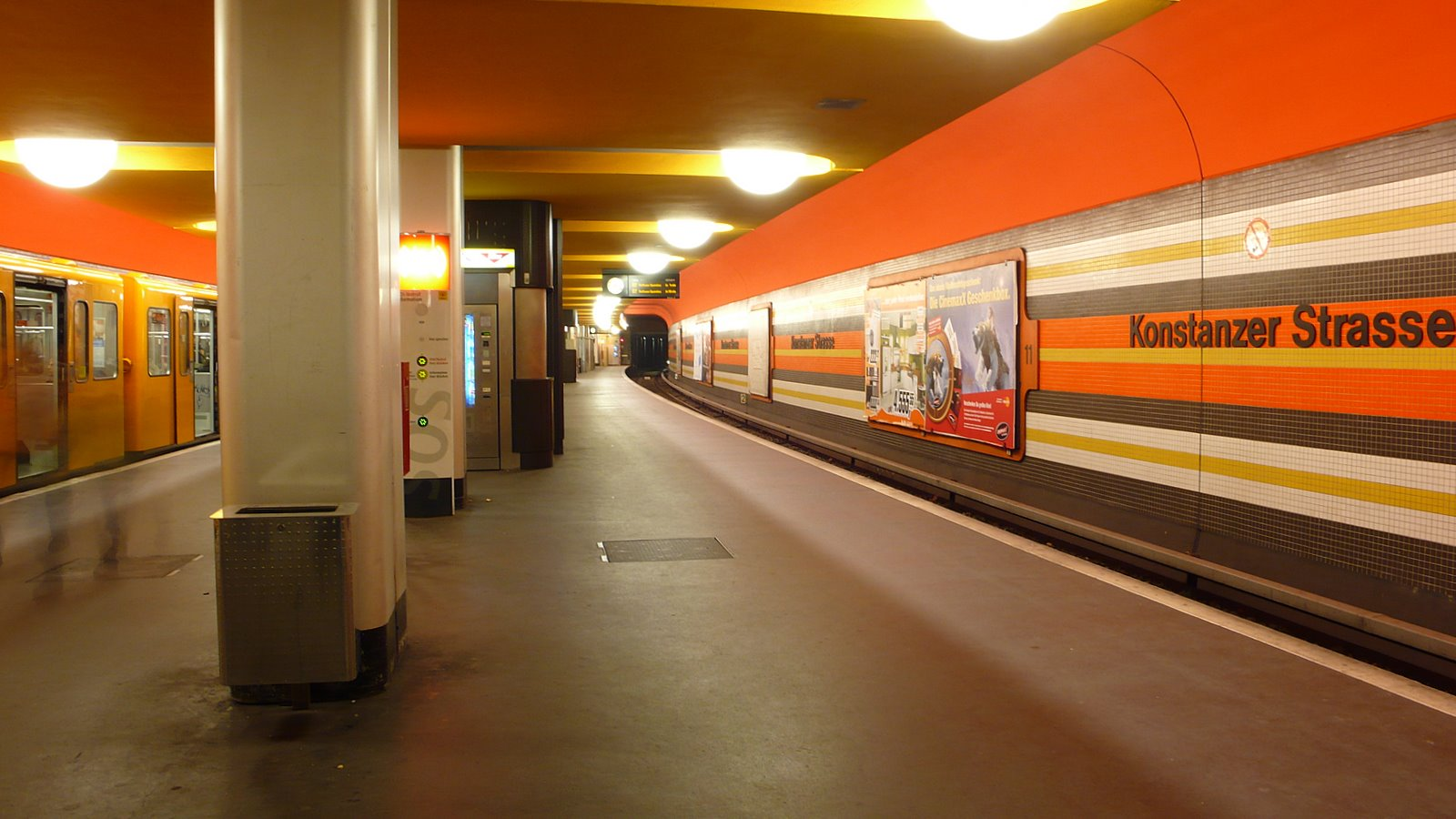
Platform view

It was opened on 28 April 1978 (architect R.Rümmler) with the line's extension to Richard-Wagner-Platz. The eponymous street is named after the town of Konstanz (Constance). The colors of the tiles on the wall of this station are also found in the emblem of the city Konstanz.

On 14 February 2007 a second entrance was constructed on the opposite end of the station to improve safety. The new entrance was opened on 28 May 2008 and leads to the central reservation of Brandenburgischer Straße, between Wittelsbacher and Ballenstedter Straße. Adenauerplatz is the next station northbound, and Fehrbelliner Platz (for the U3) is the next southbound.
