= Mierendorffplatz station =

Station of the Berlin U-Bahn

Coordinates: 52°31′35″N 13°18′18″E

Mierendorffplatz
- Platform view of Mierendorffplatz

General information
- Location: Mierendorffplatz, Berlin
- Owner: Berliner Verkehrsbetriebe
- Operator: Berliner Verkehrsbetriebe
- Platforms: 1 island platform
- Tracks: 2
- Train operators: Berliner Verkehrsbetriebe
- Connections: M27 N7

Construction
- Structure type: Underground

Other information
- Fare zone: VBB: Berlin A/5555

History
- Opened: 1 October 1980; 46 years ago

Services
Preceding station	Berlin U-Bahn	Following station
Jungfernheide towards Rathaus Spandau	U7	Richard-Wagner-Platz towards Rudow
Location

Mierendorffplatz is a station on the Berlin U-Bahn U7 line in Charlottenburg. It was opened on 1 October 1980 with the line's extension from Richard-Wagner-Platz to Rohrdamm. The eponymous square is named after politician and Resistance fighter Carlo Mierendorff (1897–1943). Architect Rümmler designed this station walls like the pattern of a M as in Mierendorffplatz. The next station is Richard Wagner Platz.
