= Wilmersdorfer Straße station =

Station of the Berlin U-Bahn

Coordinates: 52°30′23″N 13°18′25″E

U-Bahn station Wilmersdorfer Straße

Platform in 2007

Wilmersdorfer Straße is a Berlin U-Bahn station located on the U7 line.

The station is located under Wilmersdorfer Straße, one of Berlin's most well-known shopping districts and pedestrian zones.

It is adjacent to and considered an interchange station with Berlin-Charlottenburg station on the S-Bahn. It was opened in 1978 and designed by Rümmler. The pattern of the tiles on the walls should resemble a lily which is on the crest of Wilmersdorf. The next station southbound is Adenauerplatz.

Preceding station	Berlin U-Bahn	Following station
Bismarckstraße towards Rathaus Spandau	U7	Adenauerplatz towards Rudow
