= Deutsche Oper station =

Berlin U-Bahn station

Deutsche Oper
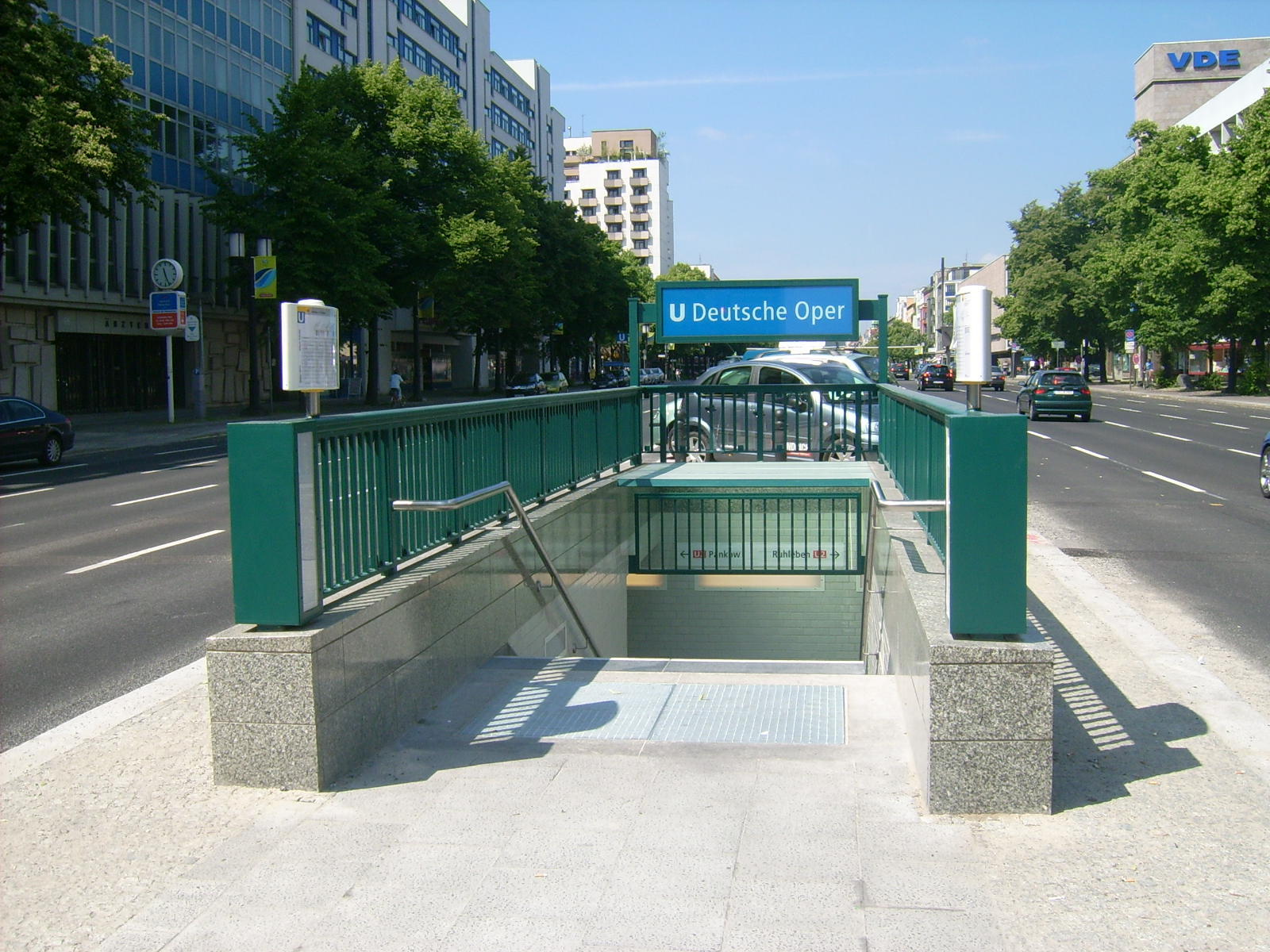
- Eastern entrance

General information
- Location: Bismarckstraße/Krumme Straße; Charlottenburg, Berlin; Germany
- Coordinates: 52°30′43″N 13°18′38″E
- Owner: Berliner Verkehrsbetriebe
- Operator: Berliner Verkehrsbetriebe
- Platforms: 2 island platforms
- Tracks: 4
- Connections: : N2

Construction
- Structure type: Underground
- Cycle facilities: Yes
- Accessible: No

Other information
- Fare zone: : Berlin A/5555

History
- Opened: 14 May 1906; 120 years ago

Services
Preceding station	Berlin U-Bahn	Following station
Bismarckstraße towards Ruhleben	U2	Ernst-Reuter-Platz towards Pankow
Route map
Location
- Location within Berlin Location within Germany Location within Europe

Deutsche Oper is a station of the Berlin U-Bahn on line U2, located in the Charlottenburg district. It is named after the Deutsche Oper Berlin.

== Overview ==
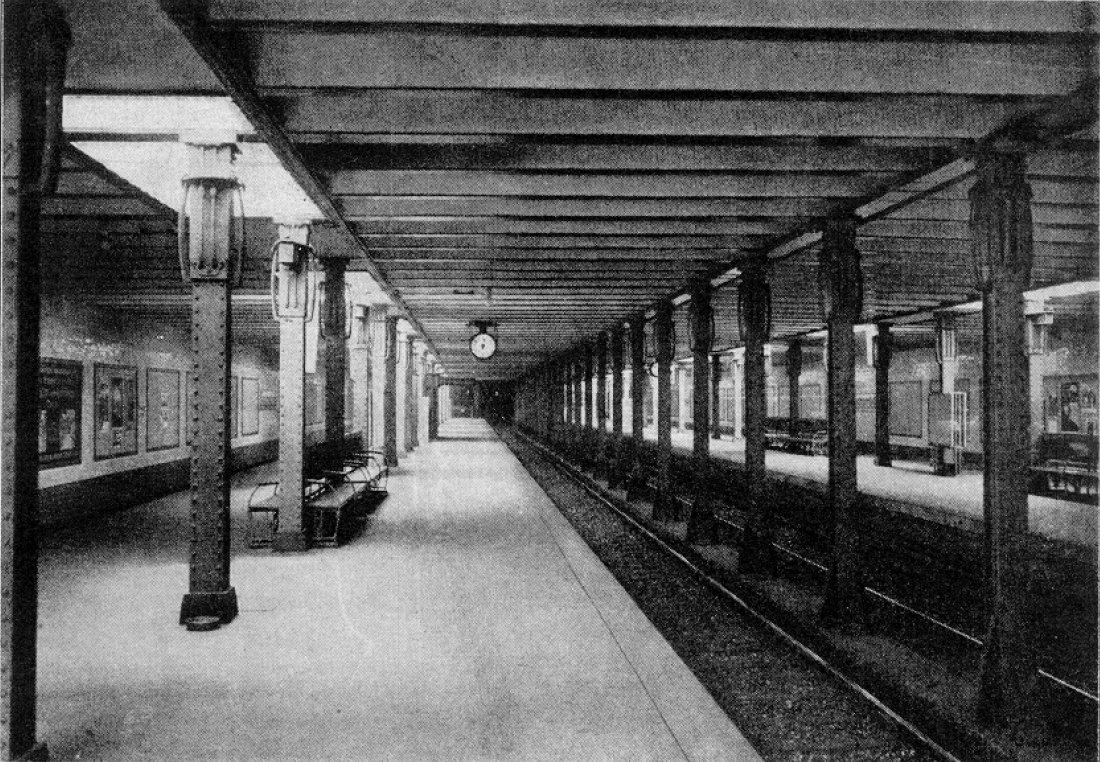
Bismarckstraße station, 1908

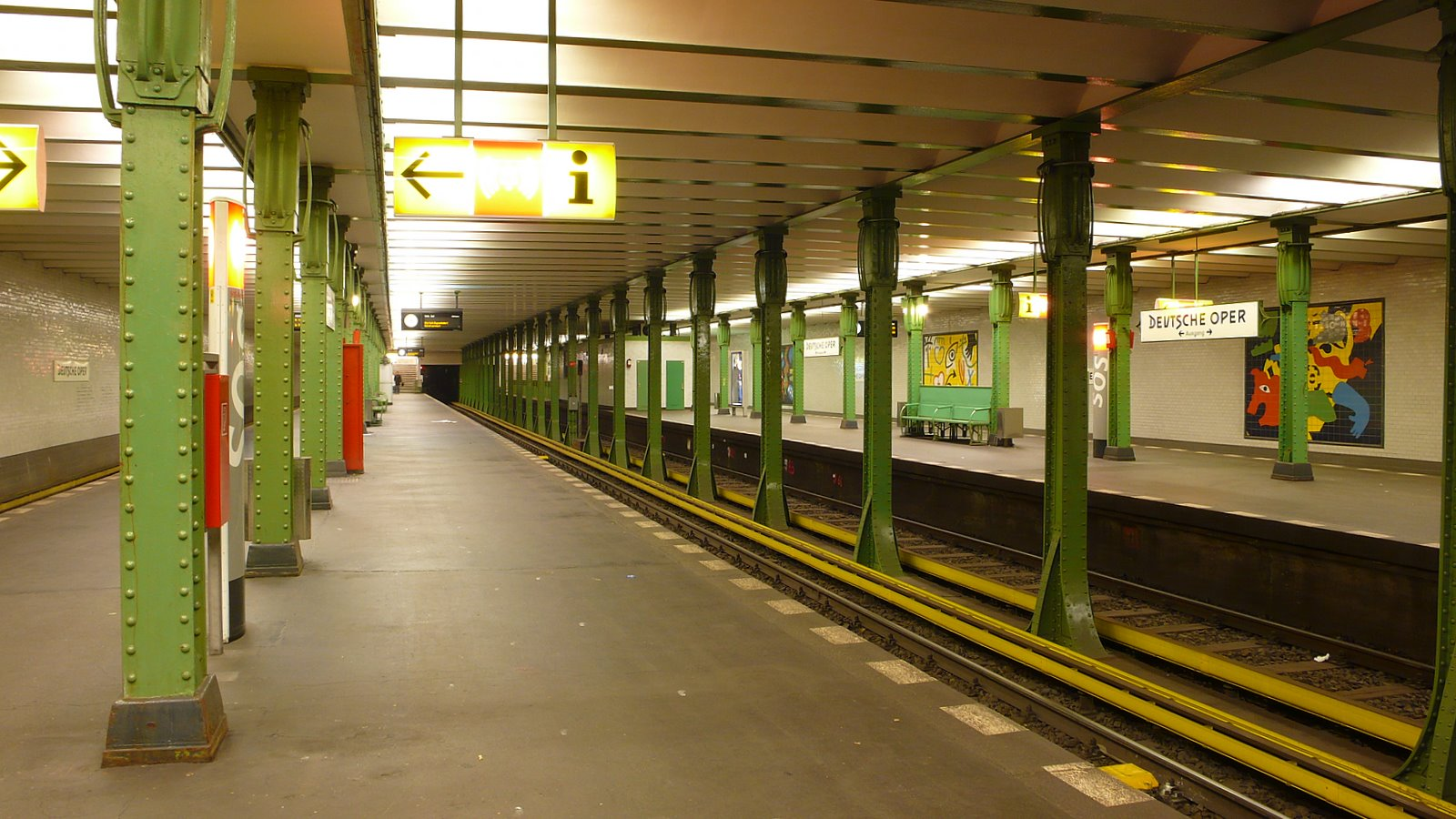
Platforms of the station

The station opened on 14 May 1906 under the name Bismarckstraße in the course of the first western extension of the 1902 Stammstrecke route, which originally ran from Warschauer Brücke (now Warschauer Straße) to Knie (now Ernst-Reuter-Platz).

At the same time, the Wilhelmplatz (now Richard-Wagner-Platz) station was put in operation as the western terminus. The architect Alfred Grenander had designed Germany's first U-Bahn station with four tracks, in consideration of the future branch-off to Reichskanzlerplatz (now Theodor-Heuss-Platz) in Westend that went into service on 29 March 1908.

The station was renamed Städtische Oper on 1 August 1929, Deutsches Opernhaus on 16 August 1934, and received its current name on 22 September 1961.

Service between this station and Richard-Wagner-Platz (now on the U7) ceased on 1 May 1970, leaving the two central tracks unused, however the tunnel remains and is used for maintenance service between the U2 and U7 lines. U7 service to the new Bismarckstraße station began on 28 April 1978

On 8 July 2000, during the Love Parade, a fire broke out at Deutsche Oper, injuring 21, destroying an U-Bahn train and severely damaging the station. As the only exits were at the western end of the platforms, passengers had to flee in the tunnel. As a result, the BVG decided to build a new eastern exit and reopened the station on 1 September 2000 in a renovated 1906 condition.

The walls are furnished with tiles designed by José de Guimarães, a gift from the Portuguese ambassador in Berlin. The station is featured in Rammstein's 2004 music video for Mein Teil and also in the movie Run Lola Run by Tom Tykwer.
