= Adenauerplatz station =

Station of the Berlin U-Bahn

Adenauerplatz
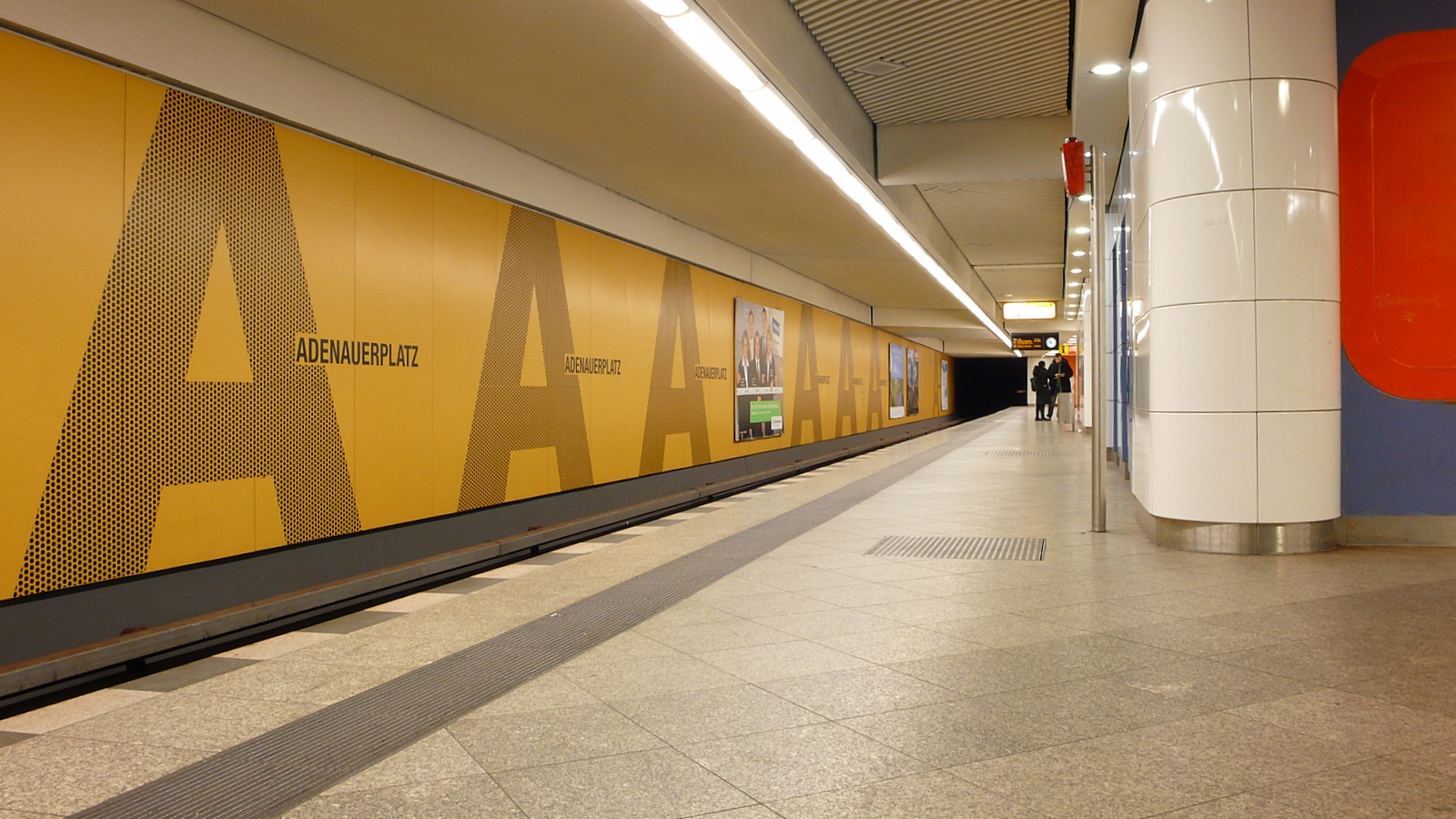

General information
- Coordinates: 52°30′00″N 13°18′26″E
- Owner: Berliner Verkehrsbetriebe
- Operator: Berliner Verkehrsbetriebe
- Platforms: 1 island platform
- Tracks: 2
- Connections: U7

Construction
- Structure type: Underground
- Accessible: Yes

Other information
- Fare zone: : Berlin A/5555

History
- Opened: 28 April 1978; 48 years ago

Services
Preceding station	Berlin U-Bahn	Following station
Wilmersdorfer Straße towards Rathaus Spandau	U7	Konstanzer Straße towards Rudow
Location
- Location within Berlin

Adenauerplatz is a Berlin U-Bahn Station on the U7 line in the district of Charlottenburg, borough of Charlottenburg-Wilmersdorf. It was opened on 28 April 1978 after the north-west extension to Spandau, and is located on the Kurfürstendamm/Lewishamstraße intersection.

== History ==
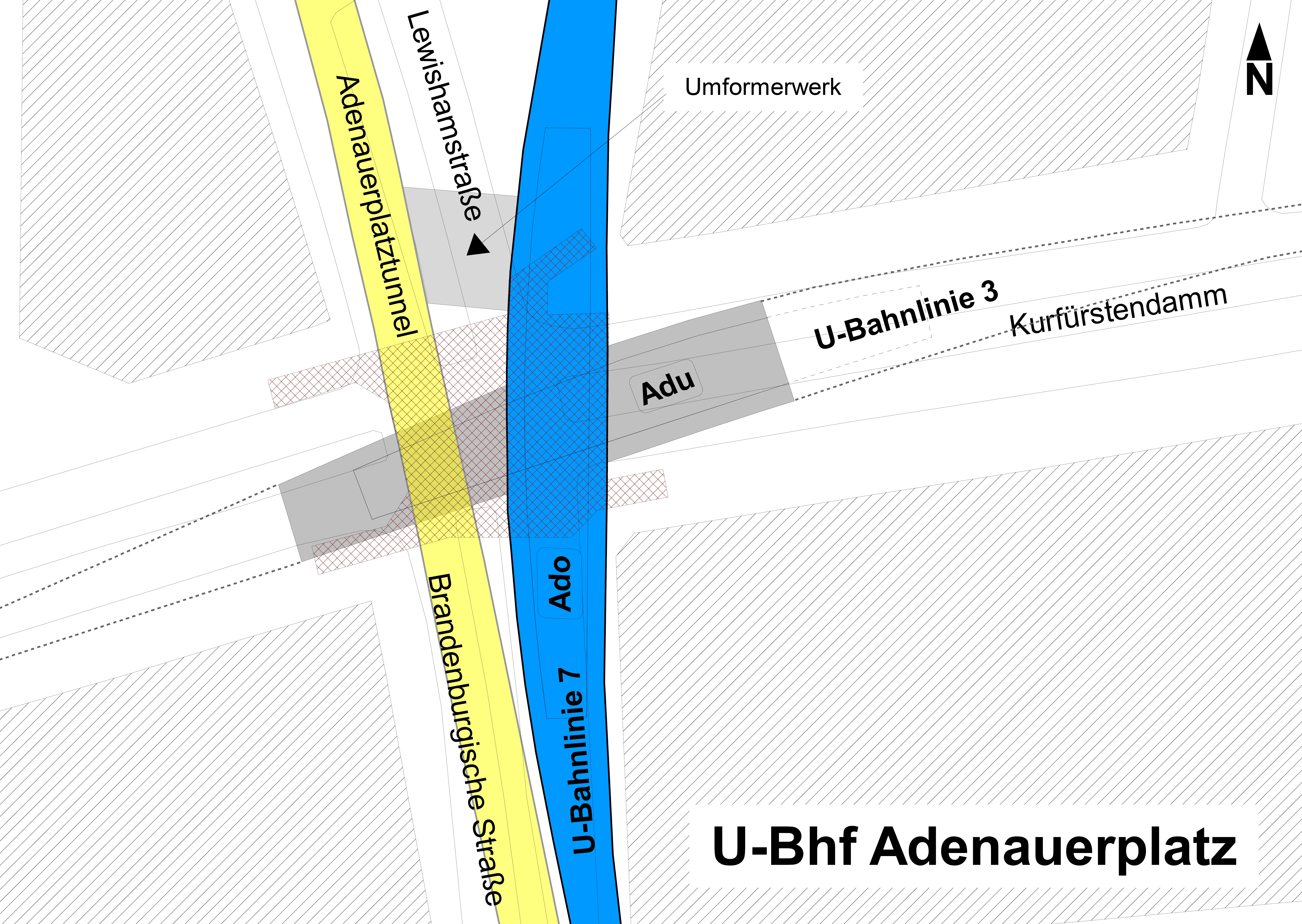
Map of the station including the U3 line.

The development of the area around the present Adenauerplatz was planned in 1913. The Kurfuerstendamm line (later U3, today U1) was to cross further westwards from the Uhlandstraße station, the present-day terminus, and terminate at Theodor-Heuss-Platz station. These plans were not initially put into action, meaning that the station was not built until the U7 line was extended in the 1970s. To accommodate the western extension of the U3, which was still in the planning stage, a second platform was built underneath the U7. The platforms are designated in the BVG station directory as Ado (U7 platform) and Adu (lower unused platform)

In 2004, the underground station underwent a complete renovation. The supports and the ceiling were fitted with a lighter trim, and granite tiles were installed as flooring. During the renovation, many of the station's original features designed by architect Rainer G. Ruemmler were removed.

In 2016, the BVG proposed to construct an elevator to make the station barrier-free. Construction started in 2018, and it was put into operation on 1 February 2019.

== Transport links ==
At this station it is possible to transfer to bus lines X10, M19, M29, 109, 110 and 310 of the Berlin Transport Authority.
