= Blissestraße station =

Station of the Berlin U-Bahn

Coordinates: 52°29′11″N 13°19′18″E

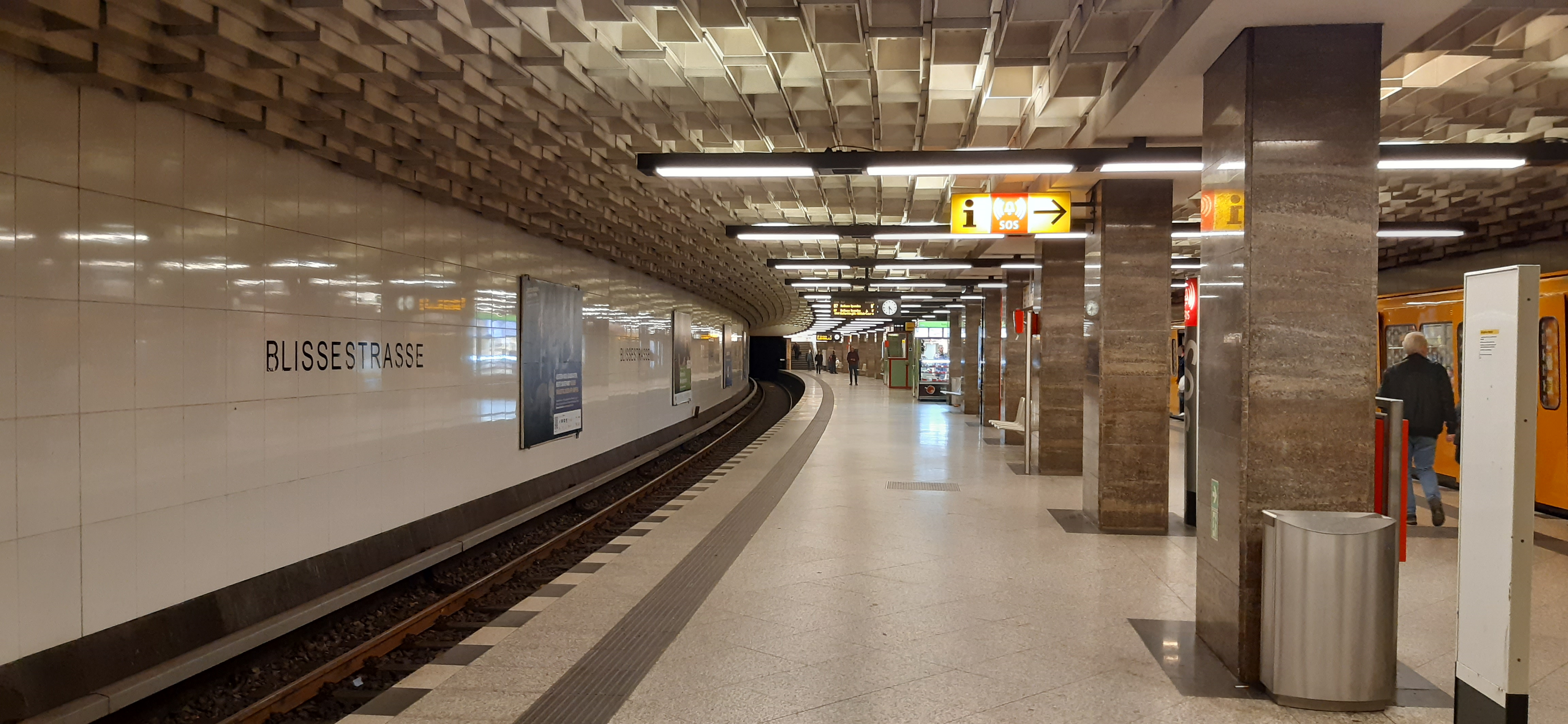
Platform of the station

Blissestraße is a Berlin U-Bahn station located on the U7. Designed by G. R. Rümmler and opened in 1971, it has a ceiling with cement caskets that reflect the light in an unusual way.

Preceding station	Berlin U-Bahn	Following station
Fehrbelliner Platz towards Rathaus Spandau	U7	Berliner Straße towards Rudow
