= Güntzelstraße station =

Station of the Berlin U-Bahn

Coordinates: 52°29′31″N 13°19′51″E

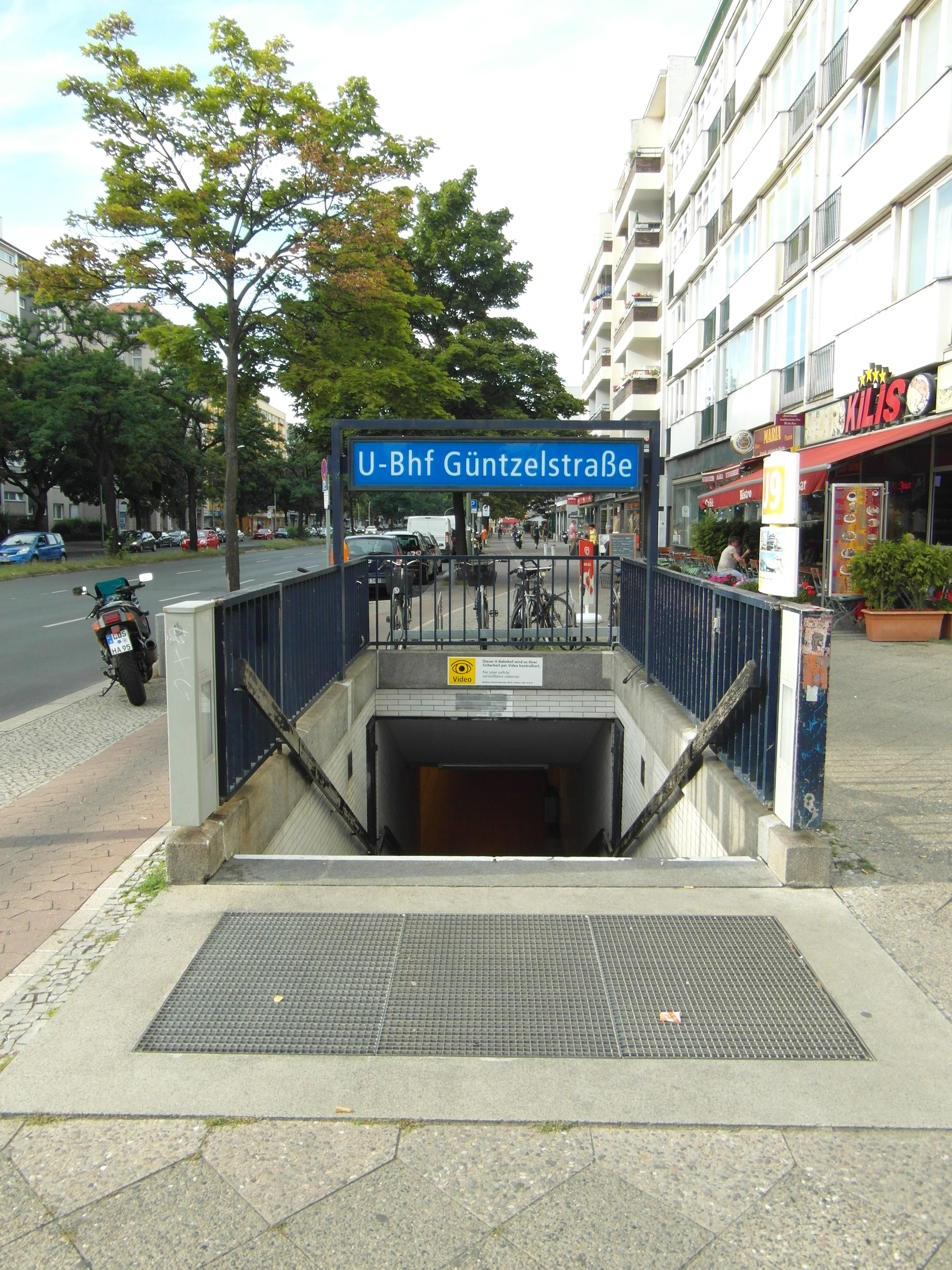
Entrance on Bundesallee

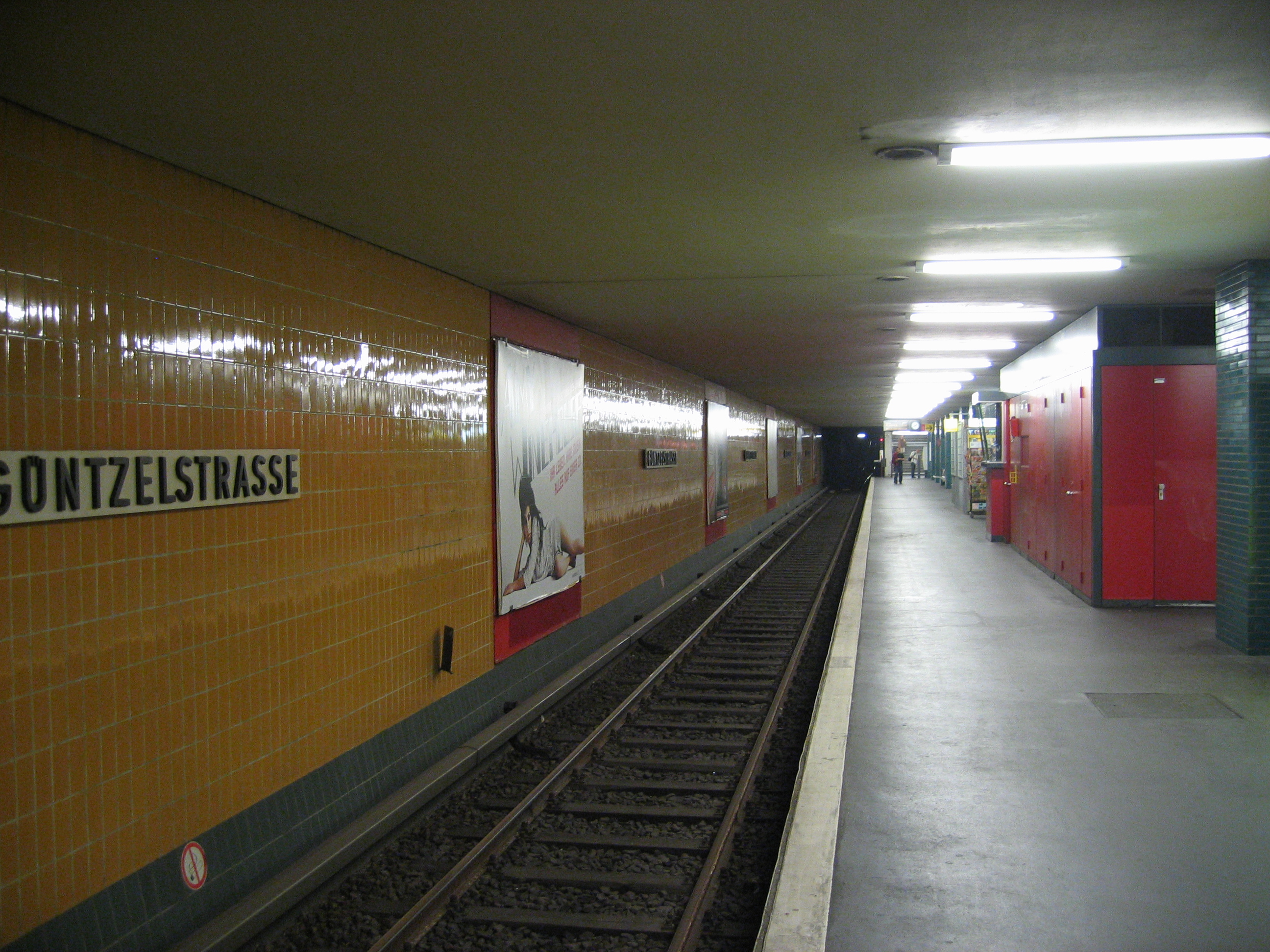
Platform view

Güntzelstraße is a Berlin U-Bahn station on the U9 line. It is located in the central Wilmersdorf district of the city. The station designed by the BVG architect Rainer G. Rümmler opened on 29 January 1971 with the line's extension from Spichernstraße to Walther-Schreiber-Platz. The station and the adjacent street are named after Karl August Bernhard Güntzel, mayor of Wilmersdorf from 1886 to 1892.

A former snack stand at the northeastern entrance was a filming location of the 1987 film Wings of Desire by Wim Wenders, starring Solveig Dommartin and Peter Falk.

Preceding station	Berlin U-Bahn	Following station
Berliner Straße towards Rathaus Steglitz	U9	Spichernstraße towards Osloer Straße
