= Richard Wagner Platz (Berlin) =

Town square in Berlin, Germany

Coordinates: 52.5173°N 13.3061°E

Richard Wagner Platz (formerly: Wilhelmplatz) is in Berlin's Charlottenburg district of Charlottenburg-Wilmersdorf. Today, the former market place is mainly perceived as a traffic junction, only a small segment of the square towards Schustehrusstraße is regularly used for weekly market purposes.

== History ==
In 1824 the former market place was named Wilhelmplatz. Since there was already a prominent square of the same name in Berlin-Mitte, the Charlottenburg area was renamed Richard-Wagner-Platz on 12 December 1934 after the composer Richard Wagner. Its buildings were regularly renovated in accordance with the architectural styles of the time and consisted mainly of Gründerzeit style buildings until 1945.

After extensive destruction during the Second World War, a large number of modern buildings were erected, particularly in the 1960s and 1970s.

== Architecture ==
To the west of Richard-Wagner-Platz is Charlottenburg Palace and directly to the east on Otto-Suhr-Allee is Charlottenburg Town Hall, built in 1905. Only a few of the former Gründerzeit style buildings have survived, the face of the square is dominated by new buildings. A residential and commercial building at the eastern end of Schustehrusstraße was designed in 1907/1908 by the architect Gustav Seibt and is now a listed building.

== Traffic ==
The streets Otto-Suhr-Allee and Wintersteinstraße/Richard-Wagner-Straße cross at Richard-Wagner-Platz. In 1906, the square was given its own underground station, which was replaced in 1974–1978 by the present Richard-Wagner-Platz underground station, where several bus lines of Berliner Verkehrsbetriebe stop.

== Gallery ==
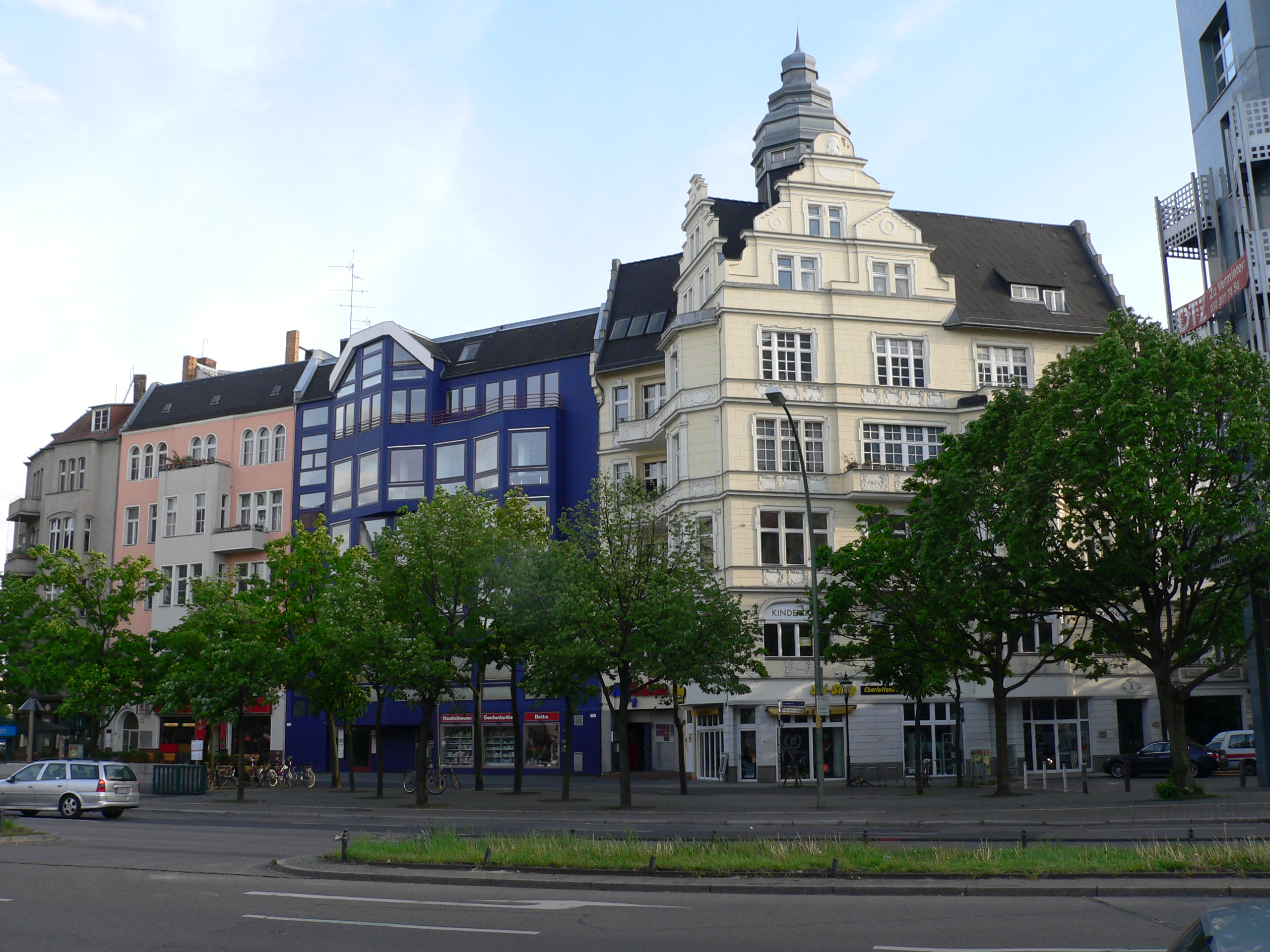

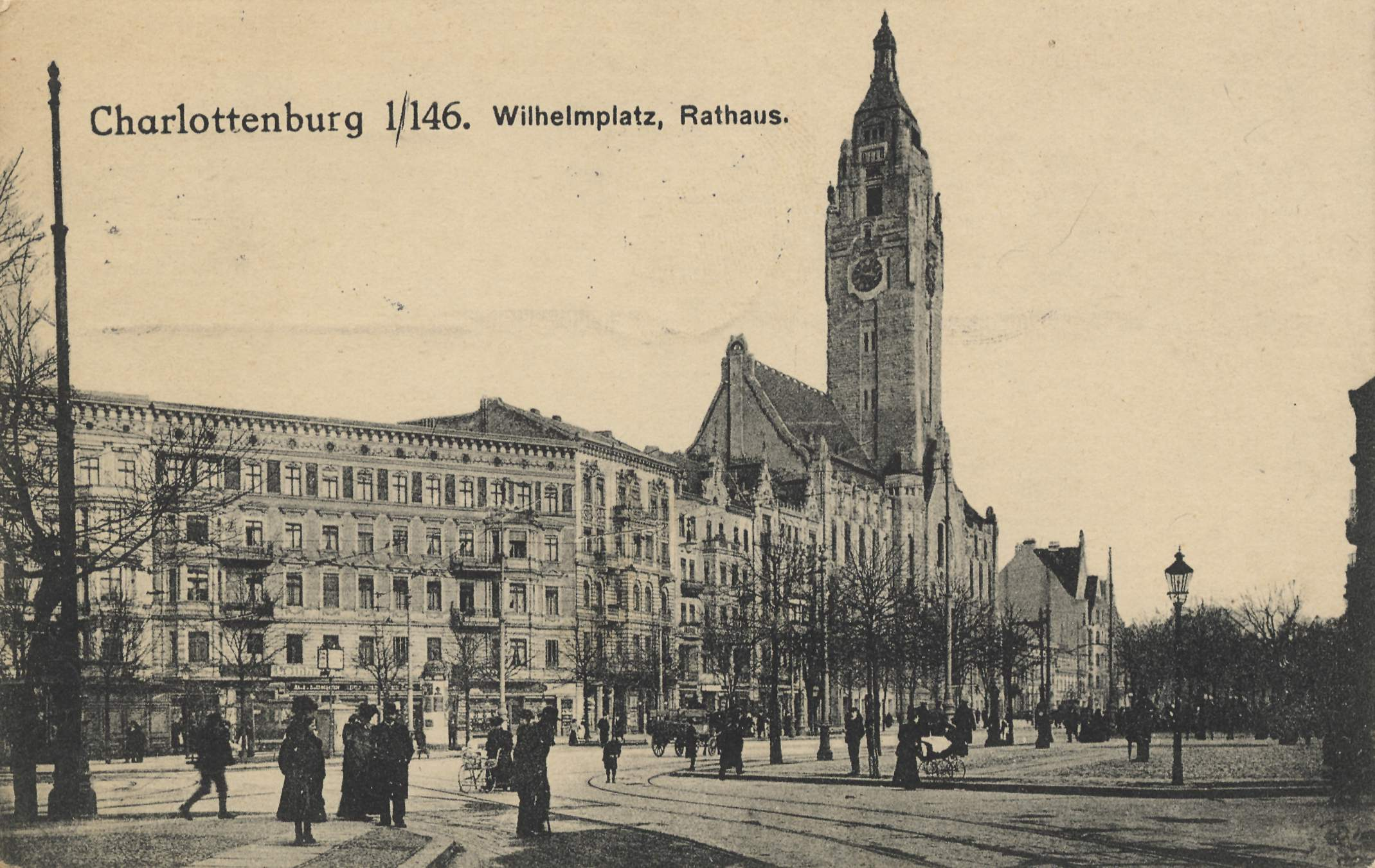

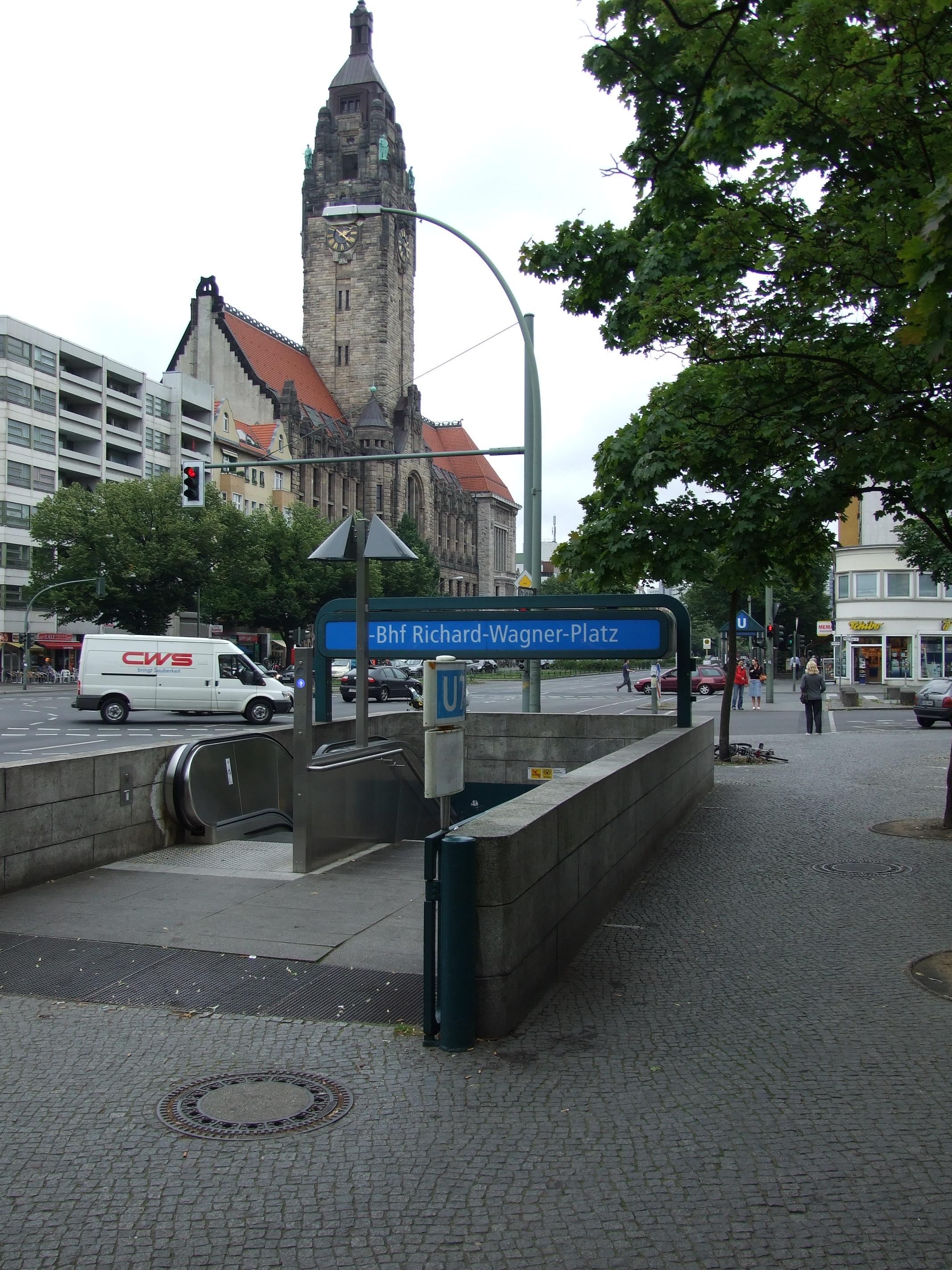

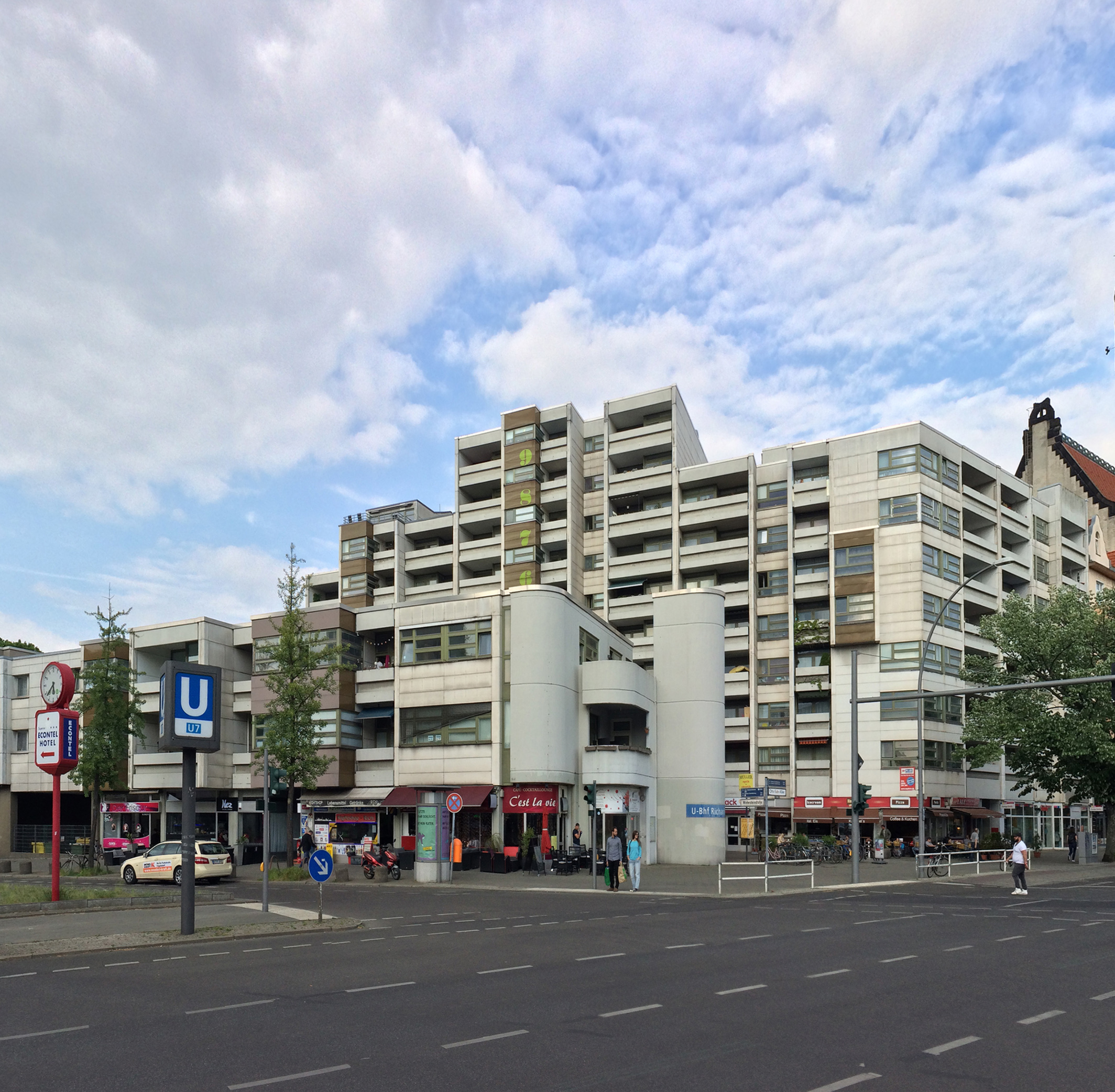

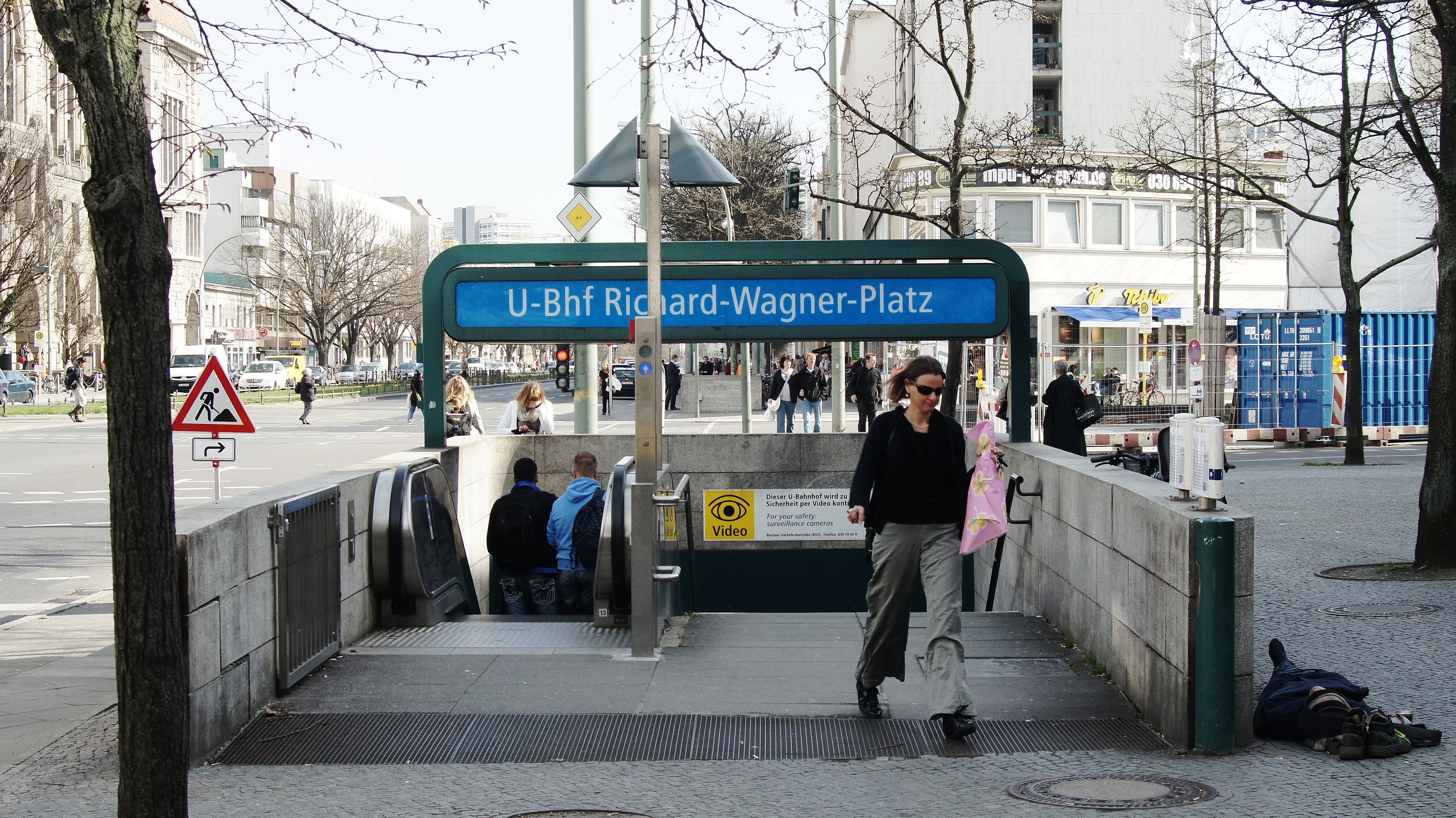

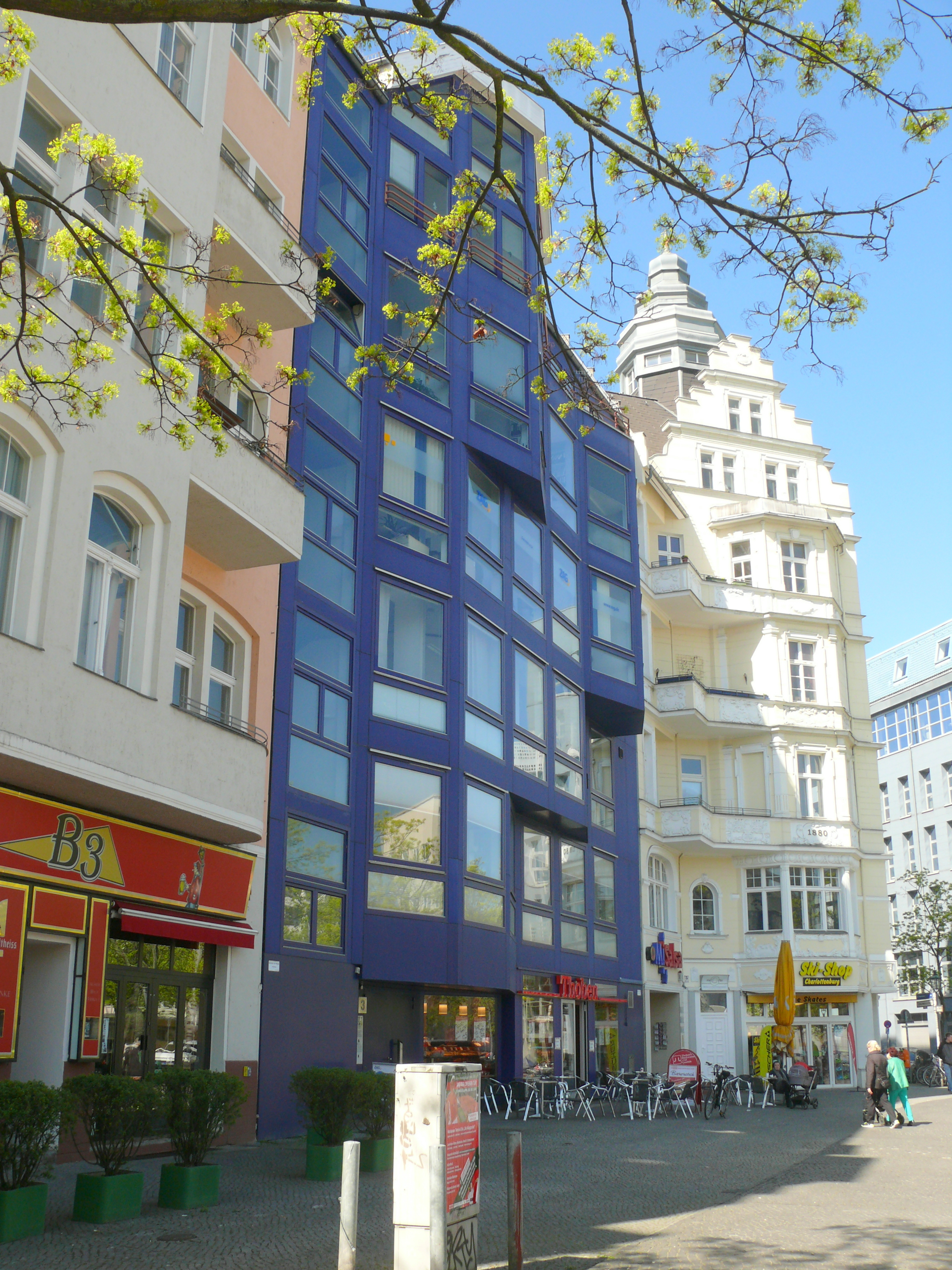

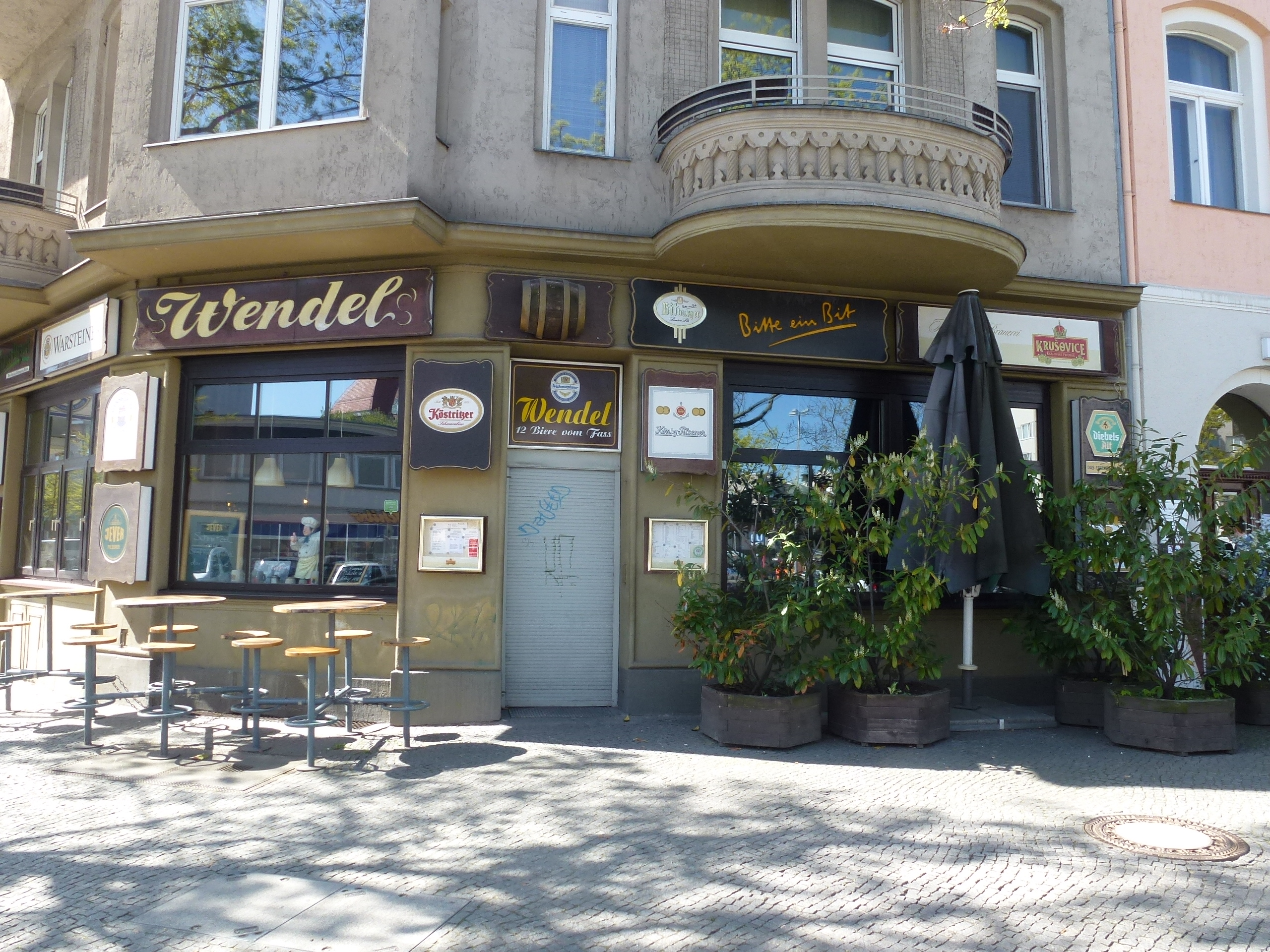
