= Mierendorffplatz =

Square in Berlin, Germany

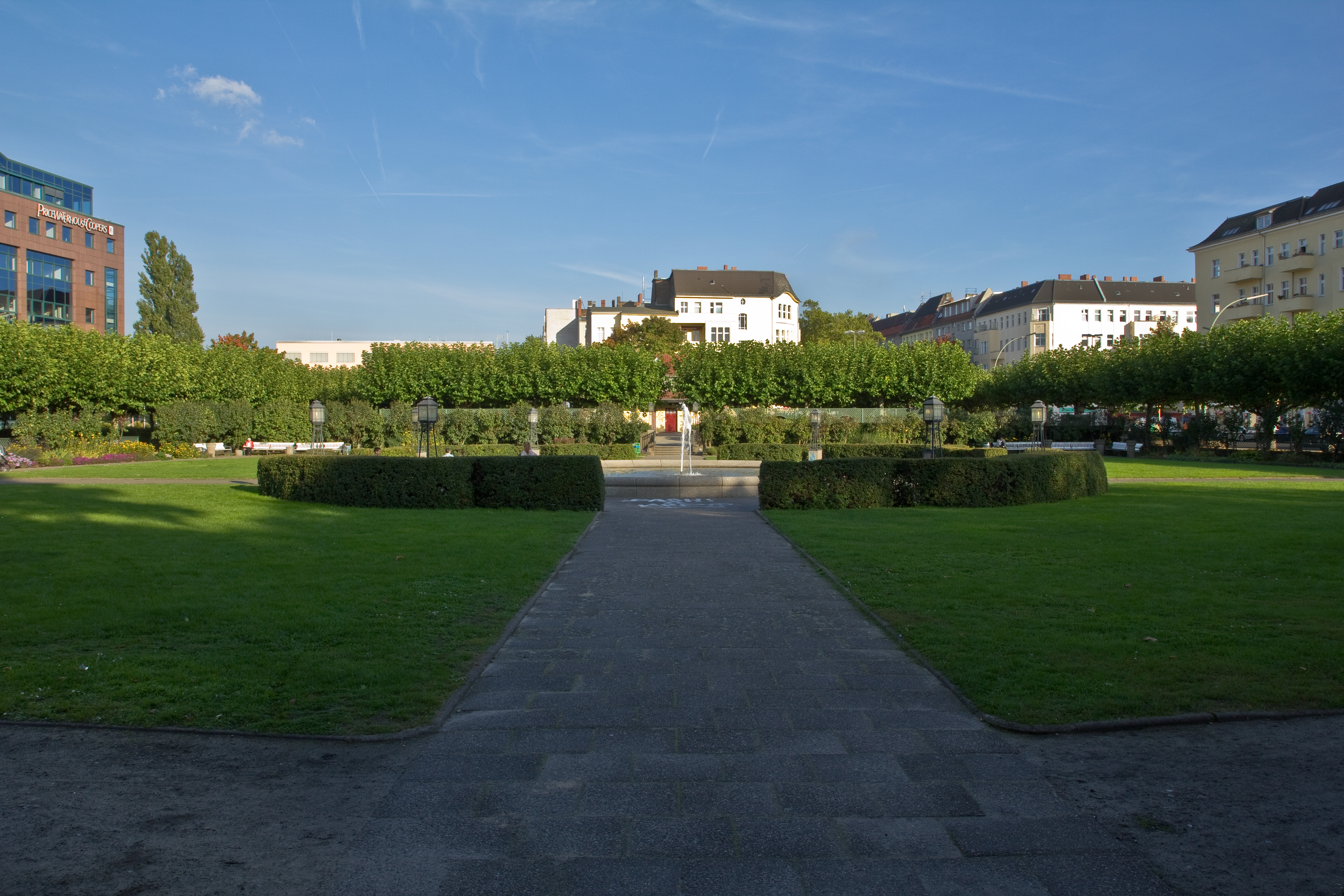
Mierendorffplatz2010

Mierendorffplatz is located in Berlin's Charlottenburg district at the intersection of Keplerstraße and Kaiserin-Augusta-Allee. From the 9000 m² large area, Mierendorffstraße runs in the direction of Charlottenburg Castle and Kaiserin-Augusta-Allee in the direction of Moabit. It was named in 1950 after the social democratic politician, social scientist and writer Carlo Mierendorff.

The bourgeois residential area around the square is also popularly known as the Mierendorff-Kiez. The historical name of the place, Kalowswerder, however, is hardly still common.

== Location and connections ==
The square consists of two parts and is situated on the artificial island between the Spree and the Charlottenburg Canal and Westhafen Canal: the rectangular northern jewelry square with fountain and the triangular southern square area, where a weekly market takes place on Wednesdays and Saturdays. It is the busy connection point of a bus line with the U7 line of the Berlin U-Bahn, whose underground station of the same name is located below the green area and was opened in 1980.

== History ==
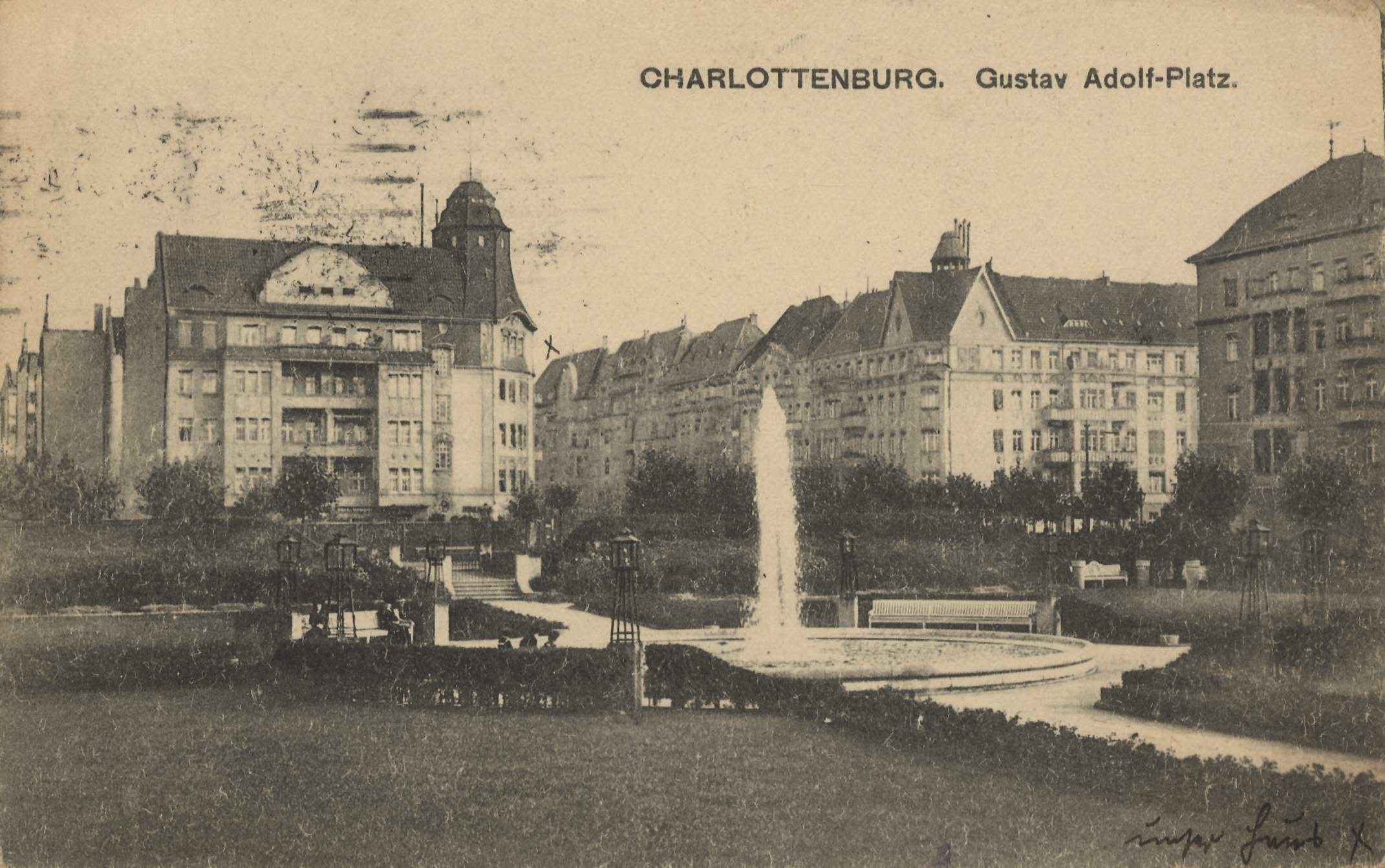
The former Gustav-Adolf-Platz, c. 1917

When planning the surrounding residential area for ordinary people, the square was already taken into account in 1887. It was originally named after King Gustavus Adolphus of Sweden in connection with the Reformation quarter. It was not until 1912/1913 that the park was designed by the municipal horticultural director Erwin Barth. In contrast to the magnificent and representative parks of the late 19th century, Mierendorffplatz is rather functional but at the same time sophisticated. The northern part of the square was again divided into two parts. In the eastern part a playground, in the west a flower garden was created, whose axis cross in the middle is supplemented by a fountain. Inside the square, roses were mainly planted. The plant is surrounded by plane trees.

After the Second World War, the square was initially used for allotments. In 1950/1951 it was converted into a green area, which was then named after Mierendorff. After the construction of the underground station, which was built in the 1970s in an open construction method, the square could be reconstructed in close accordance with Barth's plans. Fountains, benches, gates and lamps were reproduced true to the original. The Gustav Meyer Prize (named after the landscape designer Gustav Meyer) was awarded for the historical reconstruction in 2000. A commemorative plaque commemorates Barth.

== Gallery ==
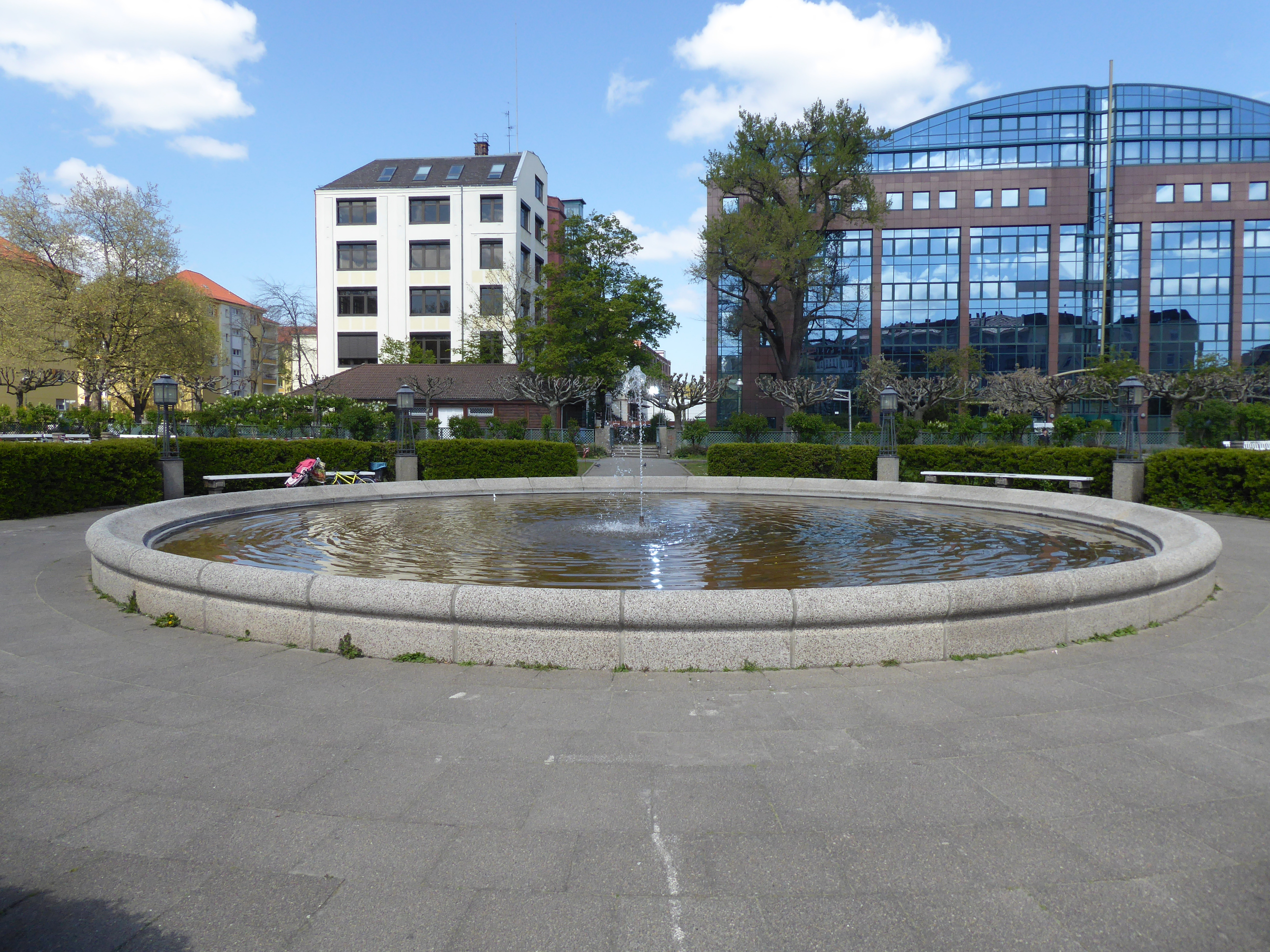

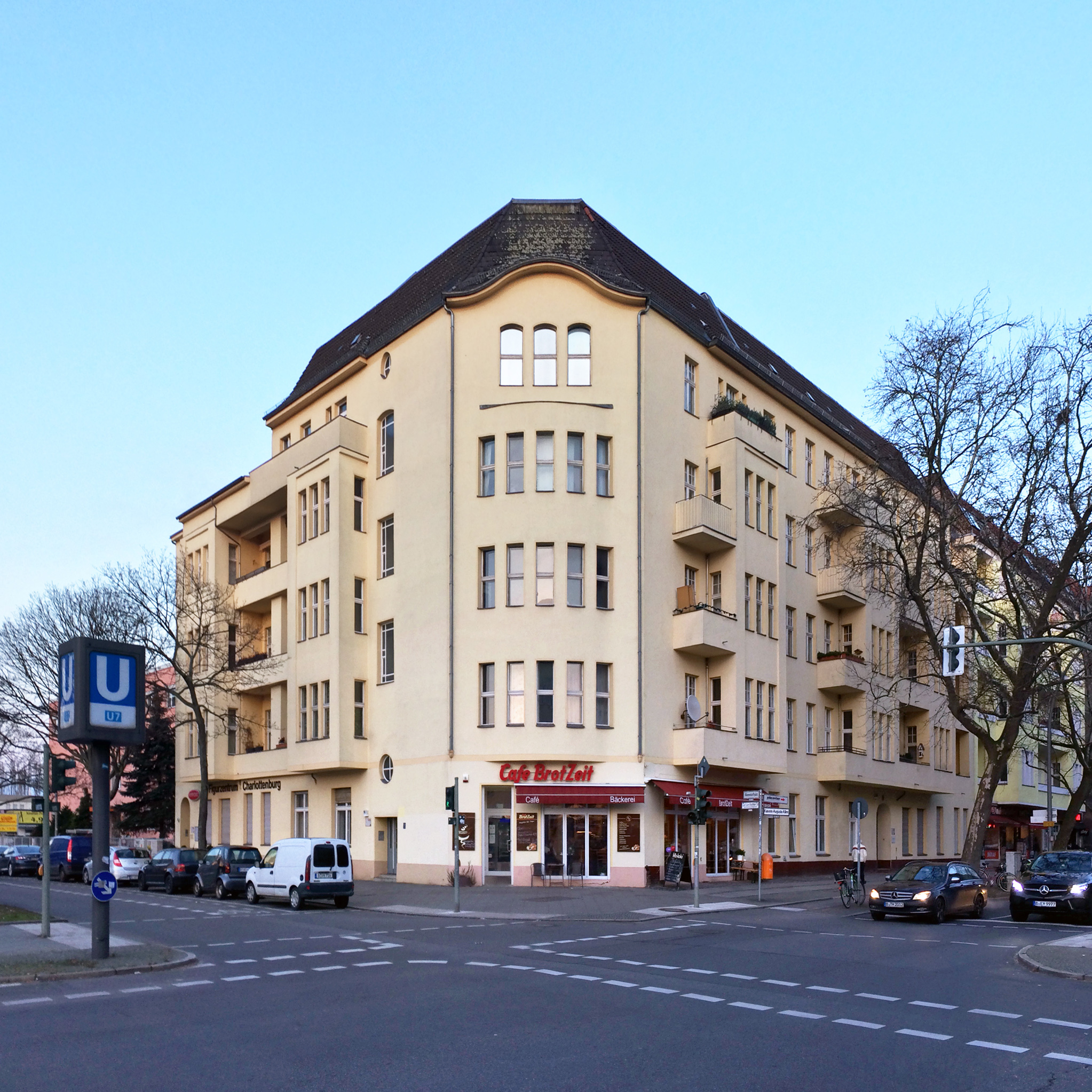

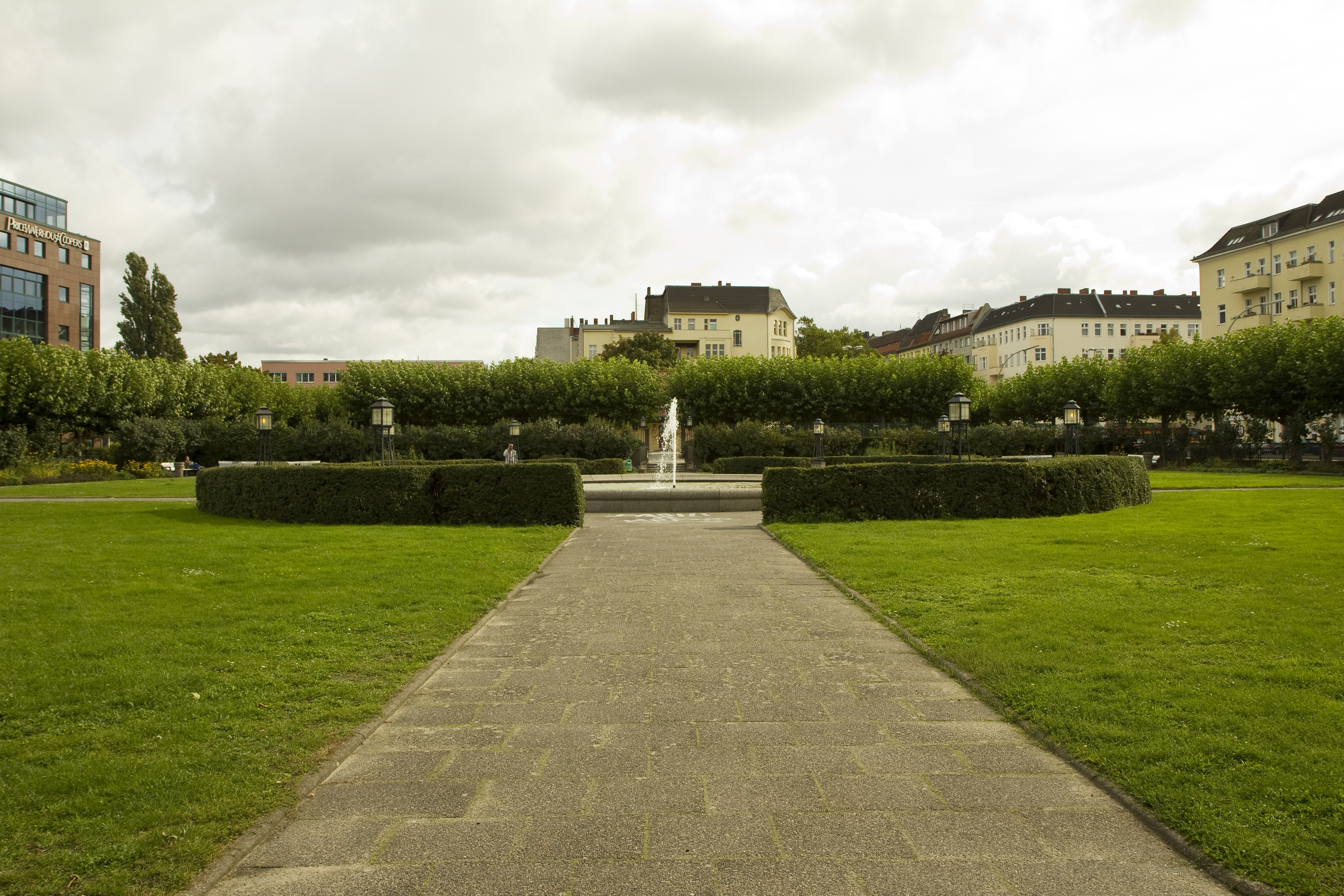

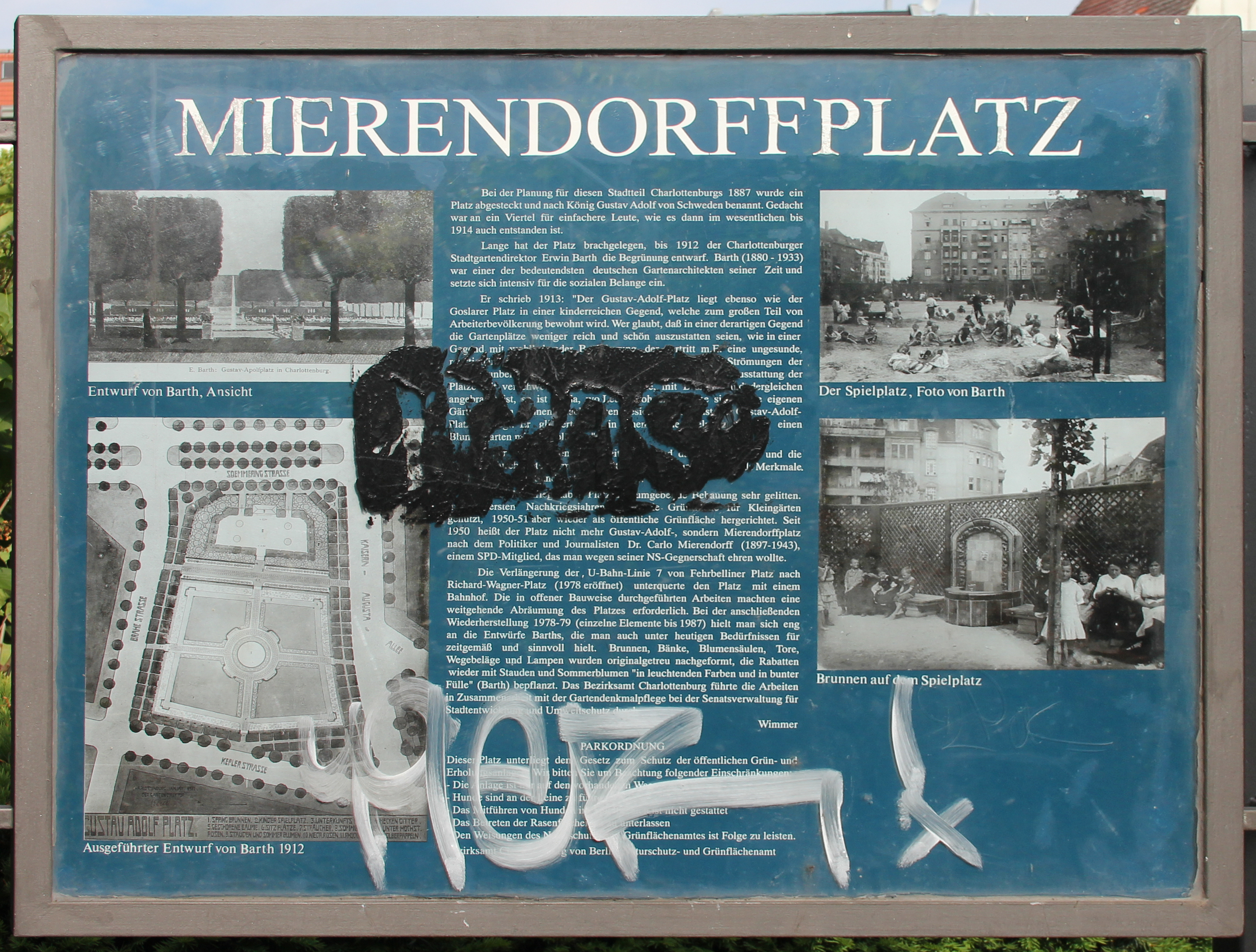
