= Ernst-Reuter-Platz station =

Berlin U-Bahn station

Ernst-Reuter-Platz
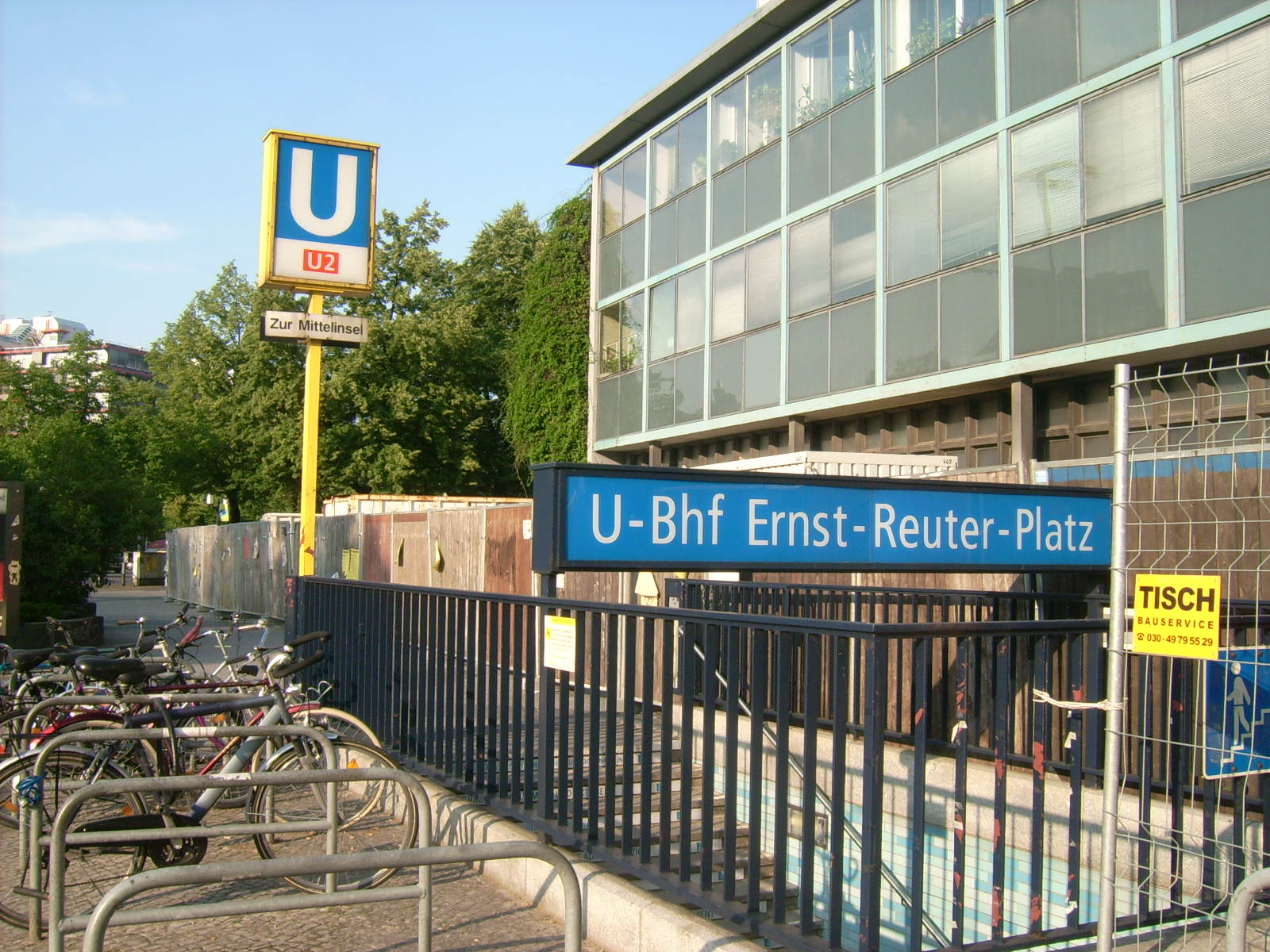
- Entrance to the station

General information
- Location: Ernst-Reuter-Platz; Charlottenburg, Berlin; Germany
- Coordinates: 52°30′46″N 13°19′18″E
- Owner: Berliner Verkehrsbetriebe
- Operator: Berliner Verkehrsbetriebe
- Platforms: 2 side platforms
- Tracks: 2
- Connections: : 245, N2; : M45

Construction
- Structure type: Underground
- Cycle facilities: Yes
- Accessible: No

Other information
- Fare zone: : Berlin A/5555

History
- Opened: 14 December 1902; 123 years ago

Services
Preceding station	Berlin U-Bahn	Following station
Deutsche Oper towards Ruhleben	U2	Zoologischer Garten towards Pankow
Route map
Location
- Location within Berlin Location within Germany Location within Europe

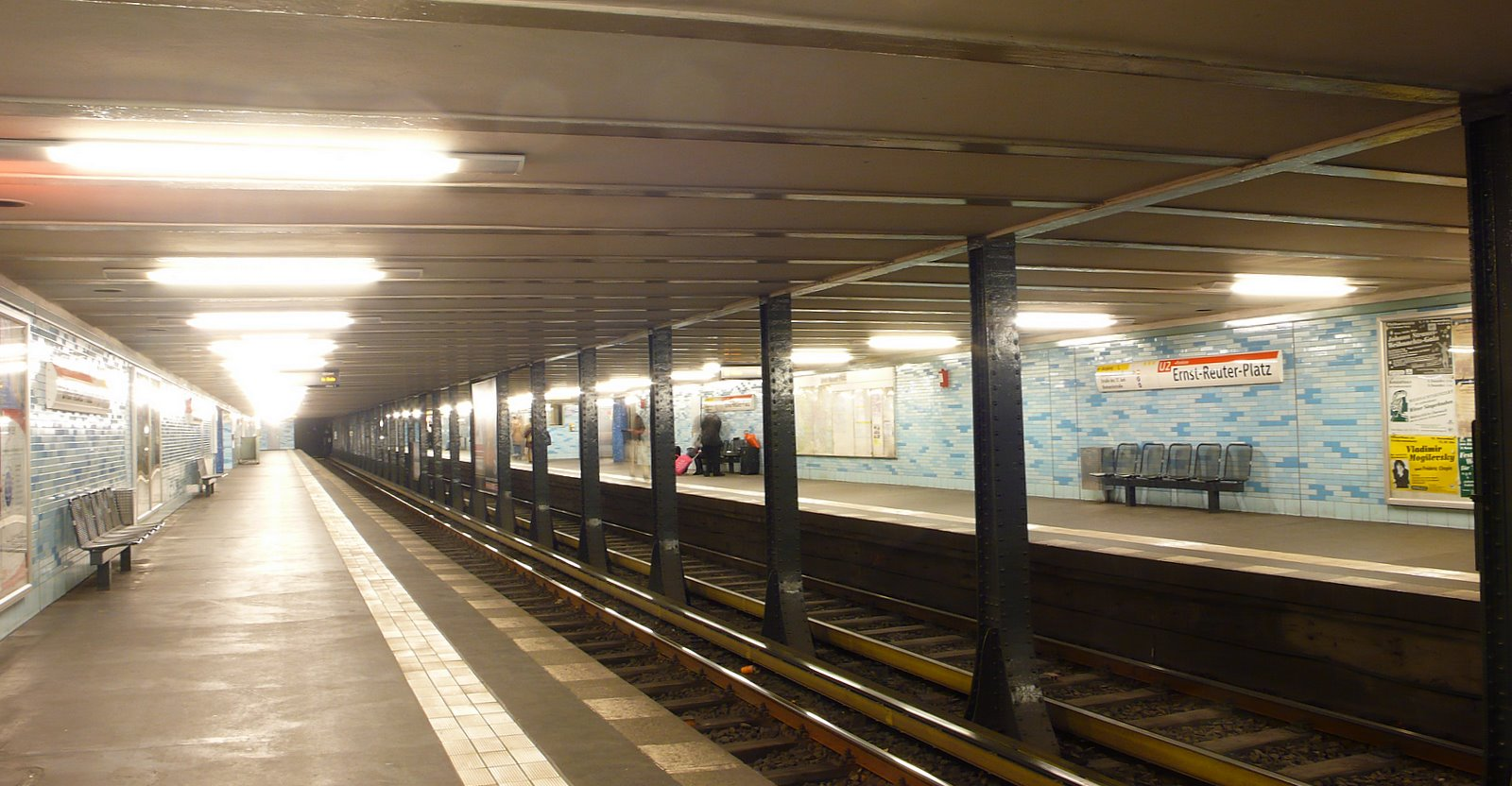
Platforms of the station

Ernst-Reuter-Platz is a Berlin U-Bahn station on line U2, located in the Charlottenburg district.

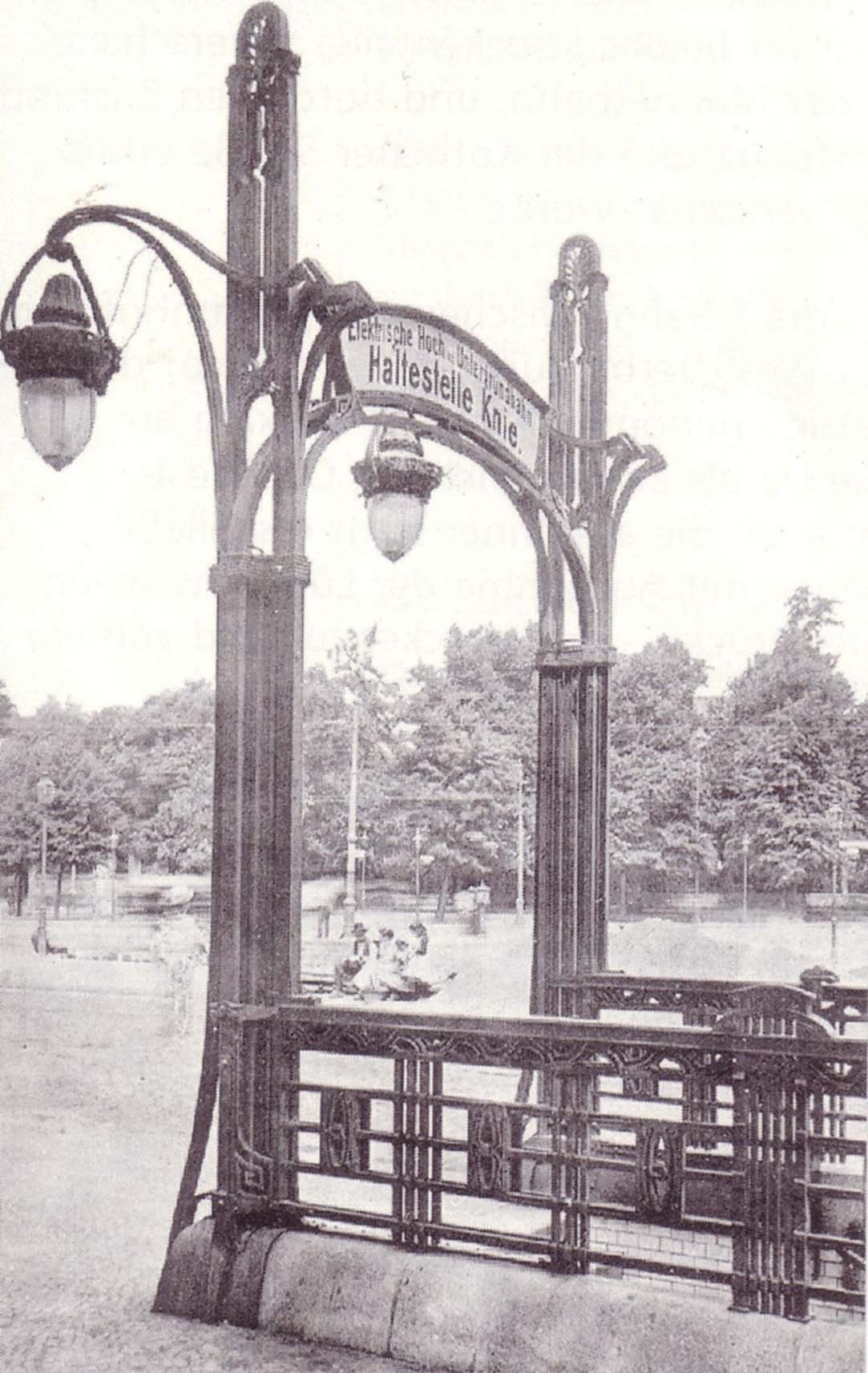
Haltestelle Knie, entrance, 1904

== History ==
After Werner von Siemens had presented the city fathers of Berlin, Schöneberg and Charlottenburg the elevated railway system several times in different variants, he received permission from the city of Berlin in 1895 to build an elevated railway from the Warschauer Brücke to Bülowstraße. In a second contract in the summer of 1896, Siemens agreed with Charlottenburg and Schöneberg to an extension of this route from Bülowstraße to the Zoological Garden. It was intended that at the former Auguste-Viktoria-Platz, today's Breitscheidplatz, an elevated railway system with a house passage should be created in order to not take the shine of the new building of the Kaiser Wilhelm Memorial Church. But soon these plans faced resistance in Charlottenburg. In 1897, the Charlottenburg city council announced that an extension beyond the Zoologischer Garten station would only be possible if the Charlottenburg area had been completely tunneled. Since the extension was definitely desirable and could save Siemens & Halske in this way the costly passage through the house, there was no objection from the company.

The station, originally designed by Alfred Grenander, opened on 14 December 1902 as the western terminus of the first U-Bahn line (Stammstrecke) to Warschauer Brücke. It was named Knie ("knee") after a curve there on the historic road between the cities of Berlin and Charlottenburg, the present-day Straße des 17. Juni. In 1906 it became a through station with the extension of the line toward Wilhelmplatz.

In 1953, the station and the eponymous square, a large roundabout, were renamed after the West Berlin mayor Ernst Reuter and extensively remodeled until 1959. It is mainly used by the students of the nearby Technische Universität Berlin.
