= Richard-Wagner-Platz station =

Station of the Berlin U-Bahn

Coordinates: 52°31′01″N 13°18′24″E

Richard-Wagner-Platz
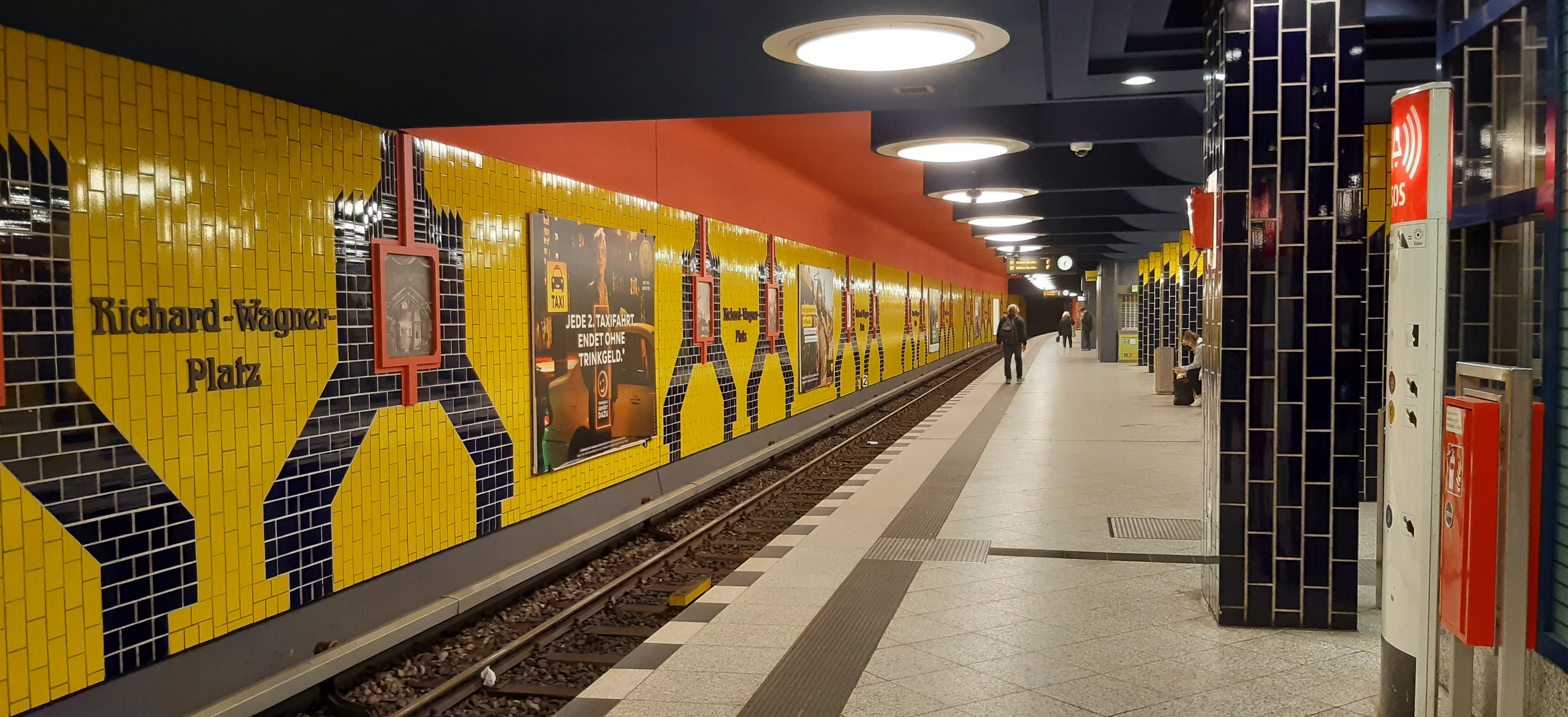
- Platform view of Richard-Wagner-Platz

General information
- Location: Richard-Wagner-Platz, Berlin
- Owner: Berliner Verkehrsbetriebe
- Operator: Berliner Verkehrsbetriebe
- Platforms: 1 island platform
- Tracks: 2
- Train operators: Berliner Verkehrsbetriebe
- Connections: M45 N7

Construction
- Structure type: Underground

Other information
- Fare zone: VBB: Berlin A/5555

History
- Opened: 14 May 1906; 120 years ago

Services
Preceding station	Berlin U-Bahn	Following station
Mierendorffplatz towards Rathaus Spandau	U7	Bismarckstraße towards Rudow
Location
- Location within Berlin

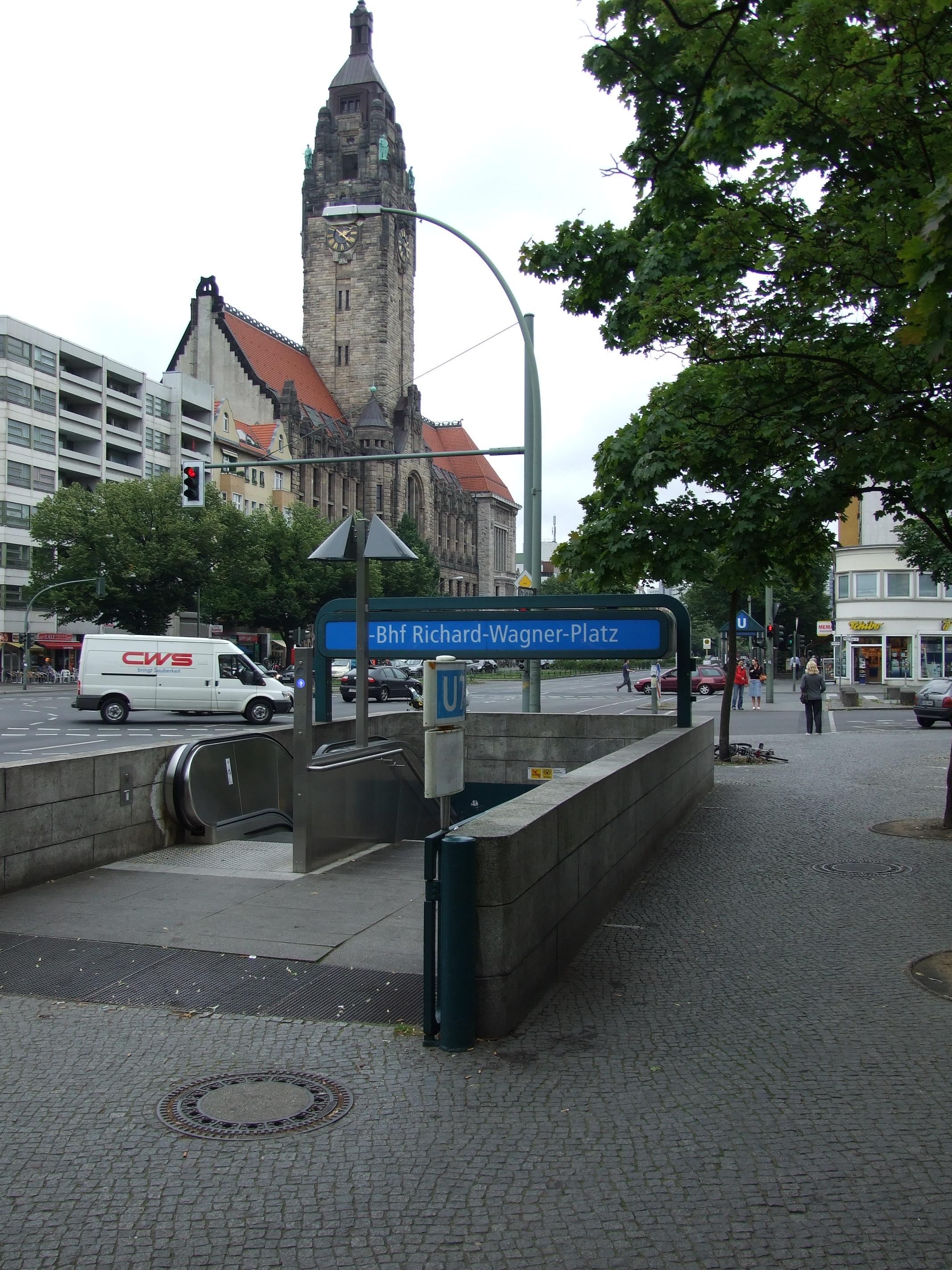
U-Bahn entrance near Charlottenburg town hall

Richard-Wagner-Platz is a Berlin U-Bahn station located on the U7 in the Charlottenburg district.

== History ==
The original station opened on 14 May 1906 under the name Wilhelmplatz, together with Deutsche Oper the first of several U-Bahn stations designed by Alfred Grenander. At the time it was the western terminus of the first Berlin U-Bahn line (Stammstrecke) after the line's extension from Knie (today Ernst-Reuter-Platz) to the Charlottenburg town hall. However, further extensions in 1908 branched off at Deutsche Oper straight westwards to Reichskanzlerplatz (today Theodor-Heuss-Platz) and the affluent Westend area, so the track to Wilhelmplatz remained a stub. In 1935 the station was renamed after the composer Richard Wagner. It was directly hit during the Battle of Berlin.

A shuttle train from Deutsche Oper (known as A^{III} and later as line 5) served the station until it was finally closed and demolished in 1970. The new Richard-Wagner-Platz station opened on 28 April 1978 with the extension of the U7 line from Fehrbelliner Platz. It features several Byzantine style mosaics of medieval historic figures, the decoration from a former hotel near Potsdamer Platz that had been demolished in 1975. As the old tunnel has been preserved there is still a direct connection to the U2 at Deutsche Oper, used solely for maintenance purposes. The next station is Bismarckstraße.
