= Fehrbelliner Platz station =

Station of the Berlin U-Bahn

Coordinates: 52°29′26″N 13°18′52″E

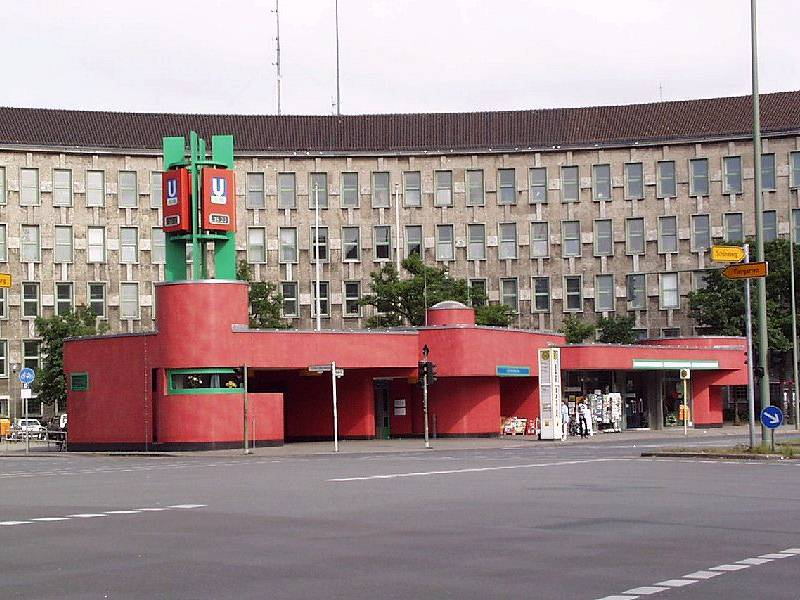
Entrance hall from 1971

Fehrbelliner Platz is a station of the Berlin U-Bahn located in the Wilmersdorf district on the U3 and the U7 lines.

The U3 section was opened on 12 October 1913 as one of the line's original stations, the U7 section on 29 January 1971 with the line's extension from Möckernbrücke. Though the station has then been widely rebuilt including the new entrance hall in a - disputed - 1970s "oil rig" style (the Bohrinsel), the U3 platform is preserved in its original condition. For more than seven years Fehrbelliner Platz was the western terminus of the U7, until its continuation toward Richard-Wagner-Platz on 28 April 1978.

The eponymous square is named after Fehrbellin, where in 1675 the Battle of Fehrbellin between Brandenburg-Prussia and the Swedish Empire took place. Its horseshoe shape was laid out in 1934 and is surrounded by several administrative buildings of the Nazi era, including the former seat of the German Labour Front finished in 1943, today the Wilmersdorf town hall. On U3, the next station is Heidelberger Platz (change here for S-Bahn) or Hohenzollernplatz. On U7, the next station is Blissestraße or Konstanzer Straße.

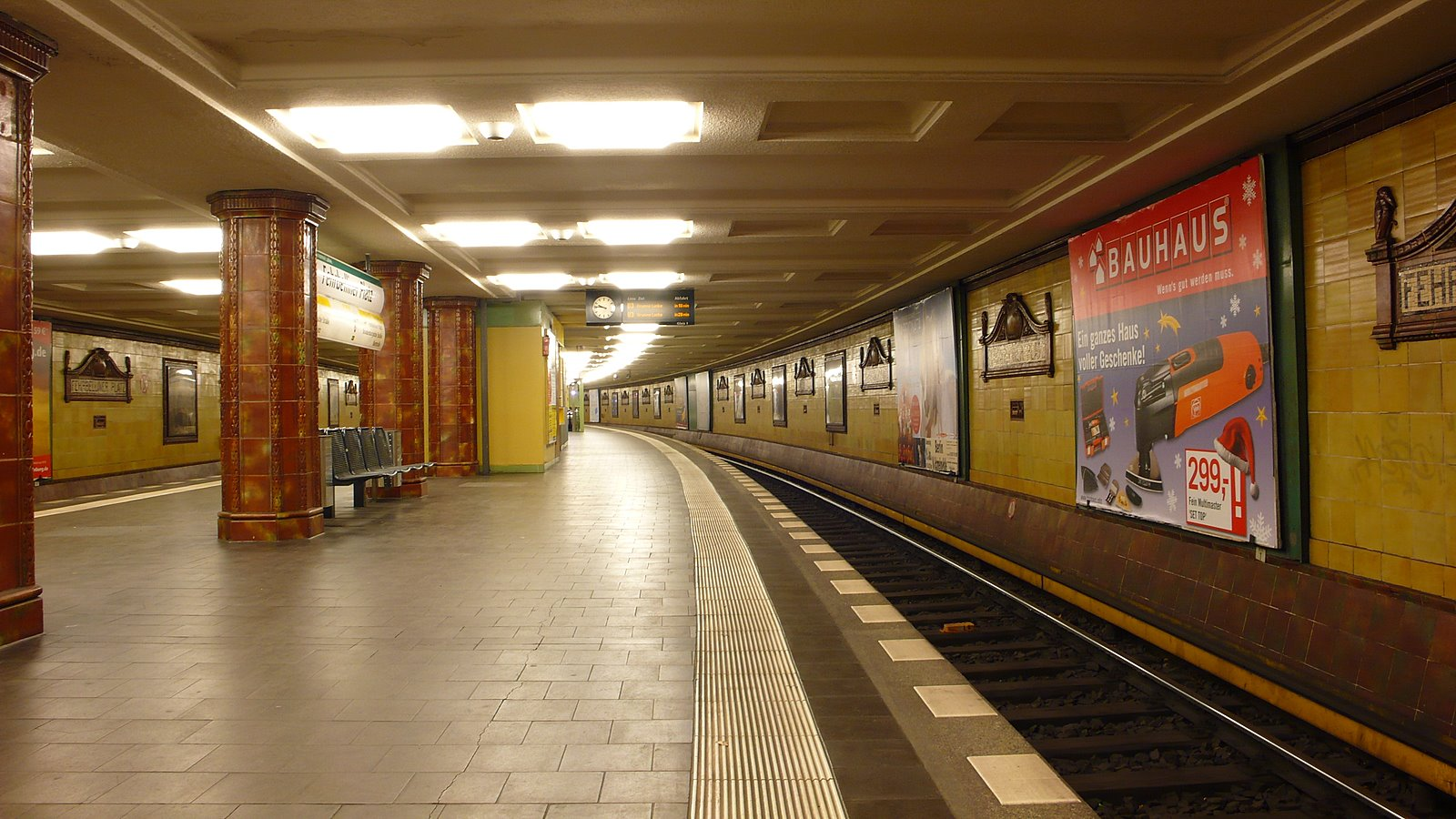
Platform of the U3

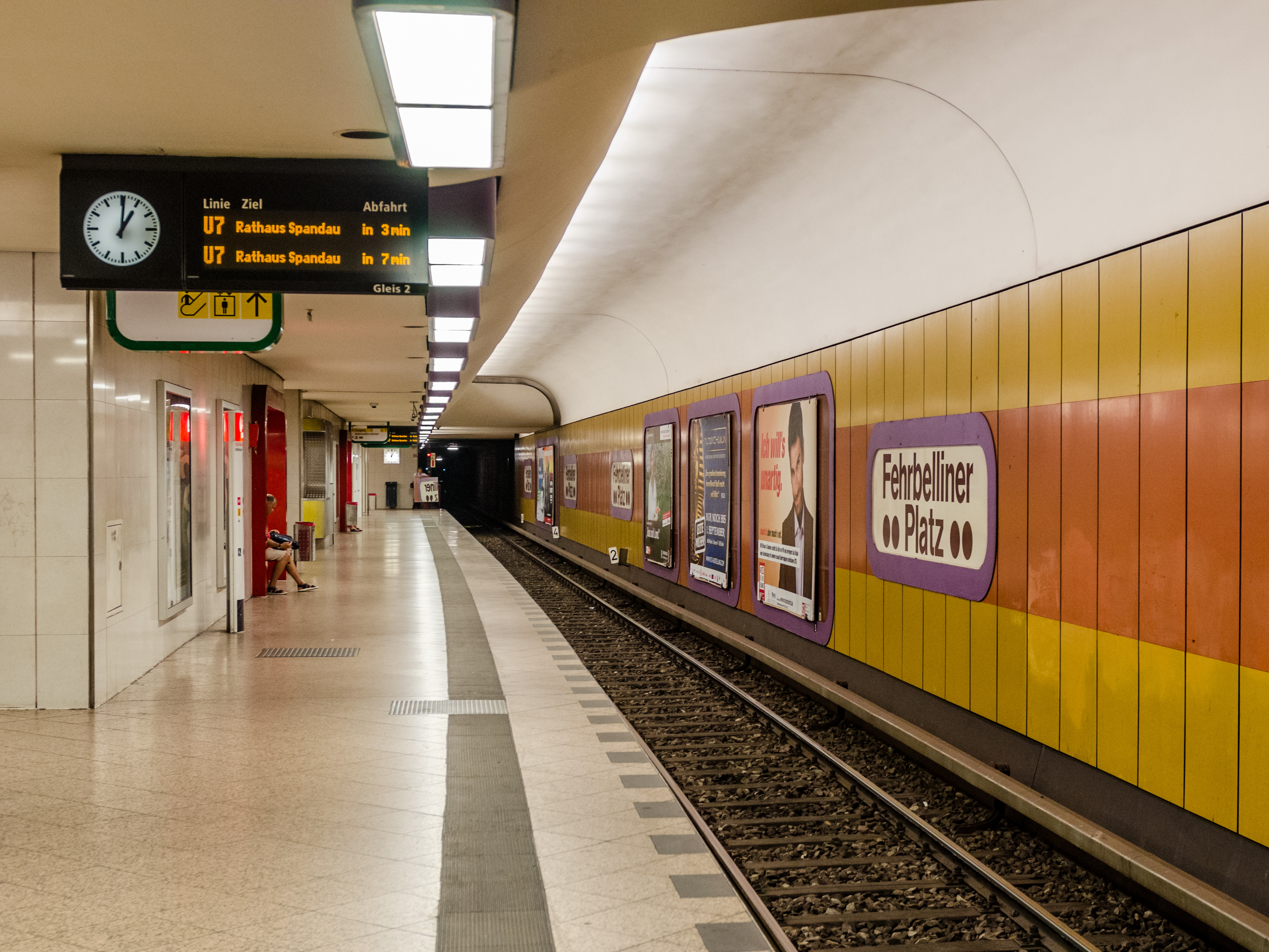
Platform of the U7

== Notes ==
Preceding station	Berlin U-Bahn	Following station
Heidelberger Platz towards Krumme Lanke	U3	Hohenzollernplatz towards Warschauer Straße
Konstanzer Straße towards Rathaus Spandau	U7	Blissestraße towards Rudow
