= Ernst-Reuter-Platz =

Square in Berlin, Germany

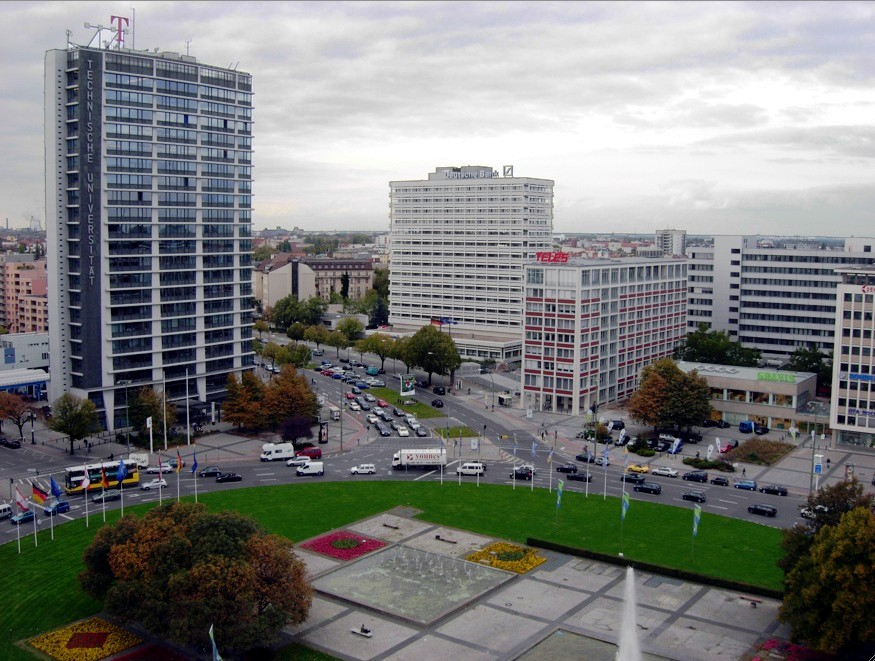
- Ernst-Reuter-Platz
- Interactive map of Ernst-Reuter-Platz
- Former names: Umschweif; (18th century–c. 1830); Am Knie; (c. 1830–1953)
- Part of: Bundesstraße 2; Bundesstraße 5
- Namesake: Ernst Reuter
- Type: Public square
- Location: Berlin, Germany
- Quarter: Charlottenburg
- Nearest metro station: Ernst-Reuter-Platz
- Coordinates: 52°30′46″N 13°19′19″E
- Major junctions: Straße des 17. Juni; Marchstraße; Otto-Suhr-Allee; Bismarckstraße; Hardenbergstraße

Construction
- Inauguration: 18th century

Ernst-Reuter-Platz is a town square in Charlottenburg, Berlin, Germany from which five streets radiate. It is named after Ernst Reuter, mayor of West Berlin from 1948–1953.

It is located at the end of Straße des 17. Juni, where it continues as Bismarckstraße, and Kaiserdamm, until Theodor-Heuss-Platz. The other streets that lead away from the square are Hardenbergstraße, Marchstraße, and Otto-Suhr-Allee (former Berliner Straße).
