= Berlin Yorckstraße station =

Railway and subway station in Berlin, Germany

Coordinates: 52°29′32″N 13°22′04″E

Yorckstraße
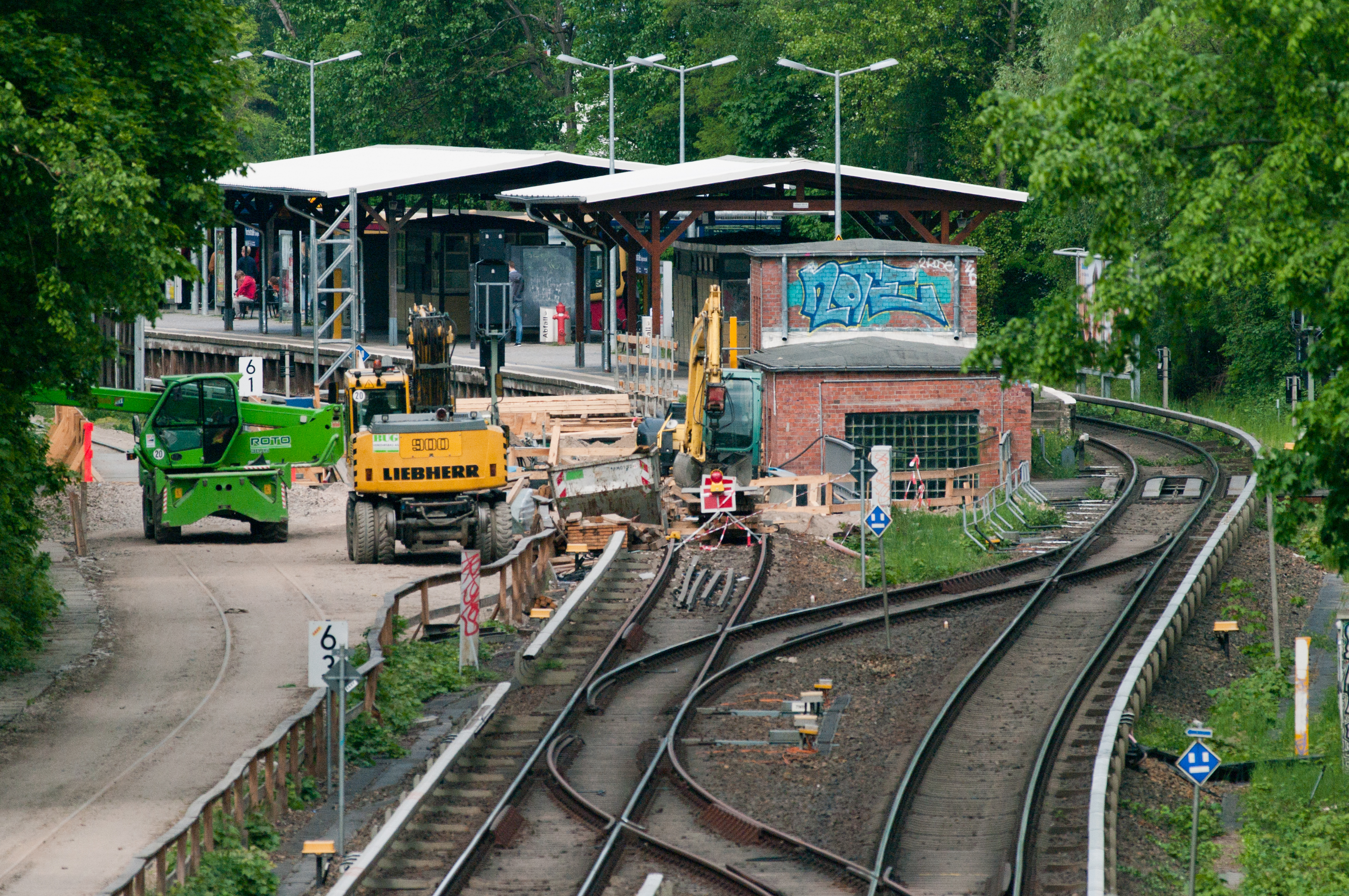
- Yorckstraße (Großgörschenstraße) S-Bahn station, platforms and tracks

General information
- Location: Tempelhof-Schöneberg, Berlin; Germany
- Lines: Wannsee Railway (S1); Anhalt Suburban Line (S25)/(S26); Berlin–Dresden railway (S2); U7
- Platforms: 2: Yorckstraße; 2: Yorckstraße (Großgörschenstraße)

Construction
- Accessible: no
- Architect: Karl Cornelius (station on Anhalt Railway)

Other information
- Station code: 6967
- DS100 code: BYOR: Yorckstraße; BGGS: Yorckstraße (Großgörschenstraße)
- IBNR: 8089050: Yorckstraße; 8089051: Yorckstraße (Großgörschenstraße)
- Category: 4
- Fare zone: VBB: Berlin A/5555

History
- Opened: 1 October 1891 old station on Wannsee Railway; 1 May 1903 station on Anhalt Railway; 9 October 1939 new station on Wannsee Railway; 1971 U-Bahn station

Services
Preceding station	Berlin S-Bahn	Following station
Anhalter Bahnhof towards Oranienburg	S1	Julius-Leber-Brücke towards Wannsee
Anhalter Bahnhof towards Bernau	S2	Südkreuz towards Blankenfelde
Anhalter Bahnhof towards Hennigsdorf	S25	Südkreuz towards Teltow Stadt
Anhalter Bahnhof towards Blankenburg	S26	Südkreuz towards Teltow Stadt
Preceding station	Berlin U-Bahn	Following station
Kleistpark towards Rathaus Spandau	U7	Möckernbrücke towards Rudow
Location

Berlin Yorckstraße (German: Bahnhof Berlin Yorckstraße) is an S-Bahn and U-Bahn station located in the Schöneberg locality of central Berlin, Germany.

== Overview ==
The eponymous street is named after Generalfeldmarschall Ludwig Yorck von Wartenburg. Bahnhof Yorckstraße consists of two neighbouring S-Bahn stations and an underground station:

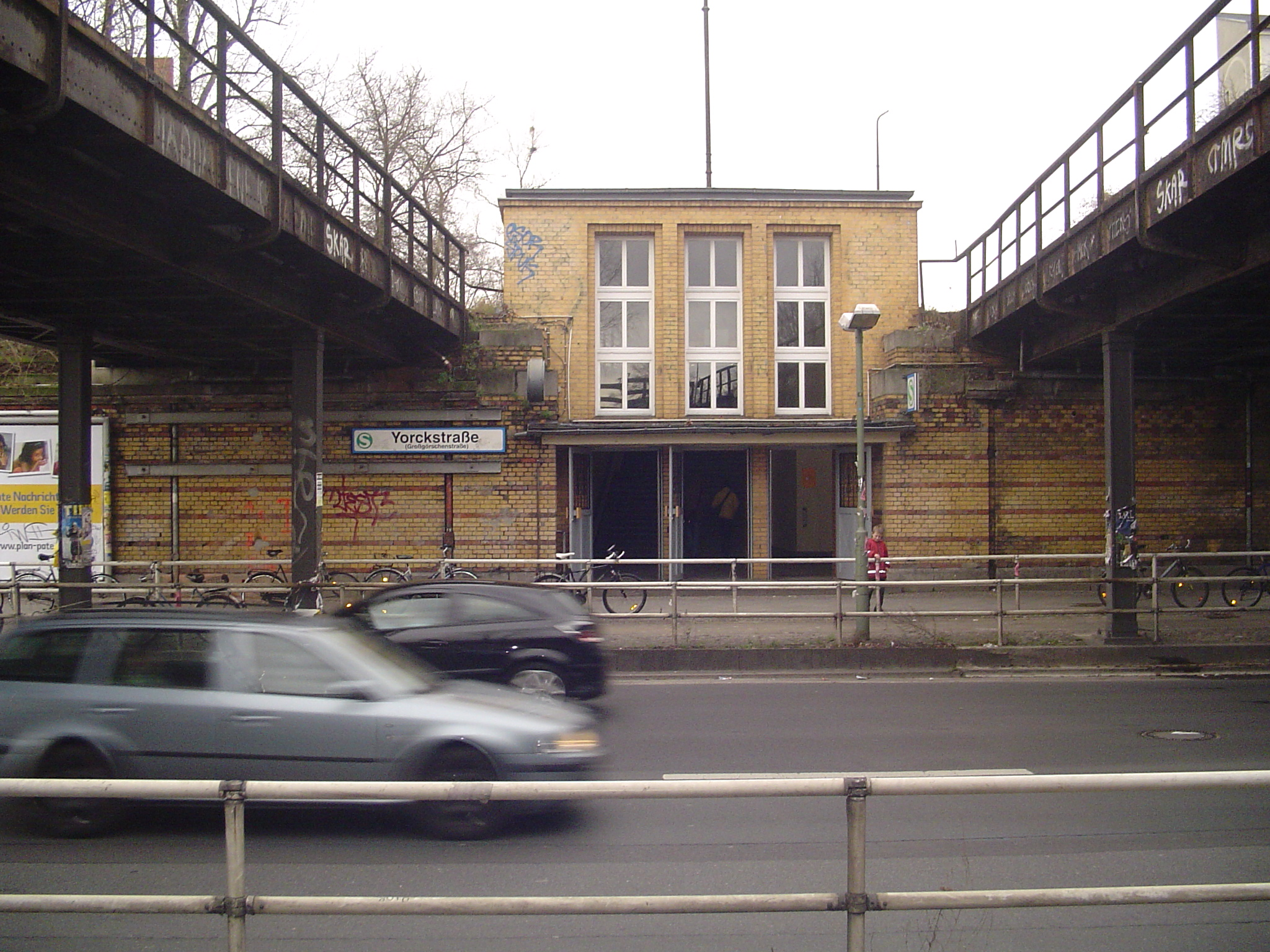
Yorckstraße (Großgörschenstraße) entrance buildings

The western Yorckstraße (Großgörschenstraße) S-Bahn station on the S1 line (DS100: BGGS) was opened as Großgörschenstraße in 1891 with the new Wannseebahn rapid transit line running from Potsdamer Bahnhof to Wannsee. Originally located south of the small Großgörschenstraße the platform was demolished and shifted northwards to its current position at the Yorckstraße with the opening of the Nord-Süd Bahn tunnel in 1939. As the "Germania" plans included a general reorganization of Berlin's railway system, only a provisional station with wooden pillars was erected that nevertheless persists until today.

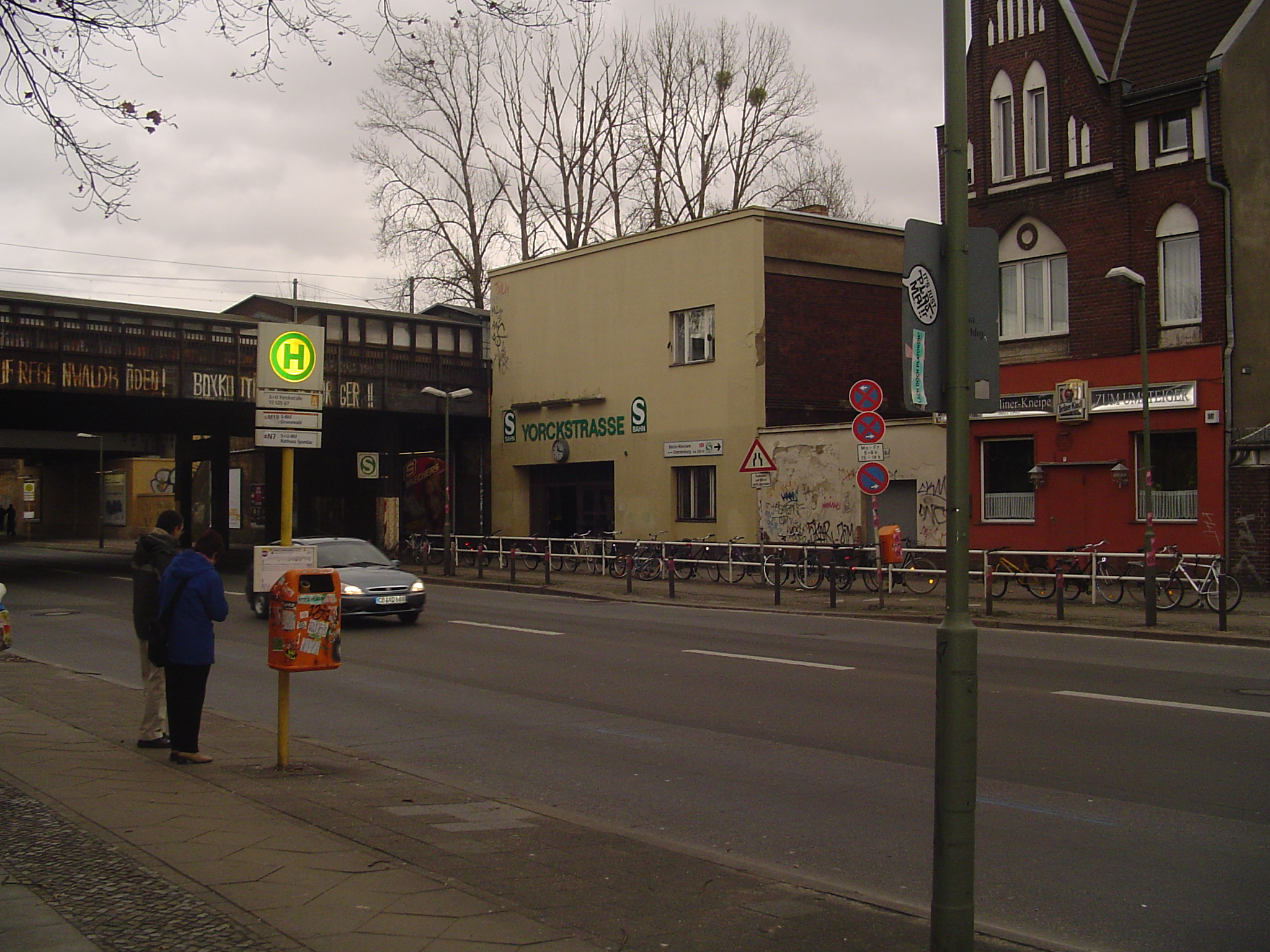
Yorckstraße S2/S25/S26, entrance on Yorckstraße road

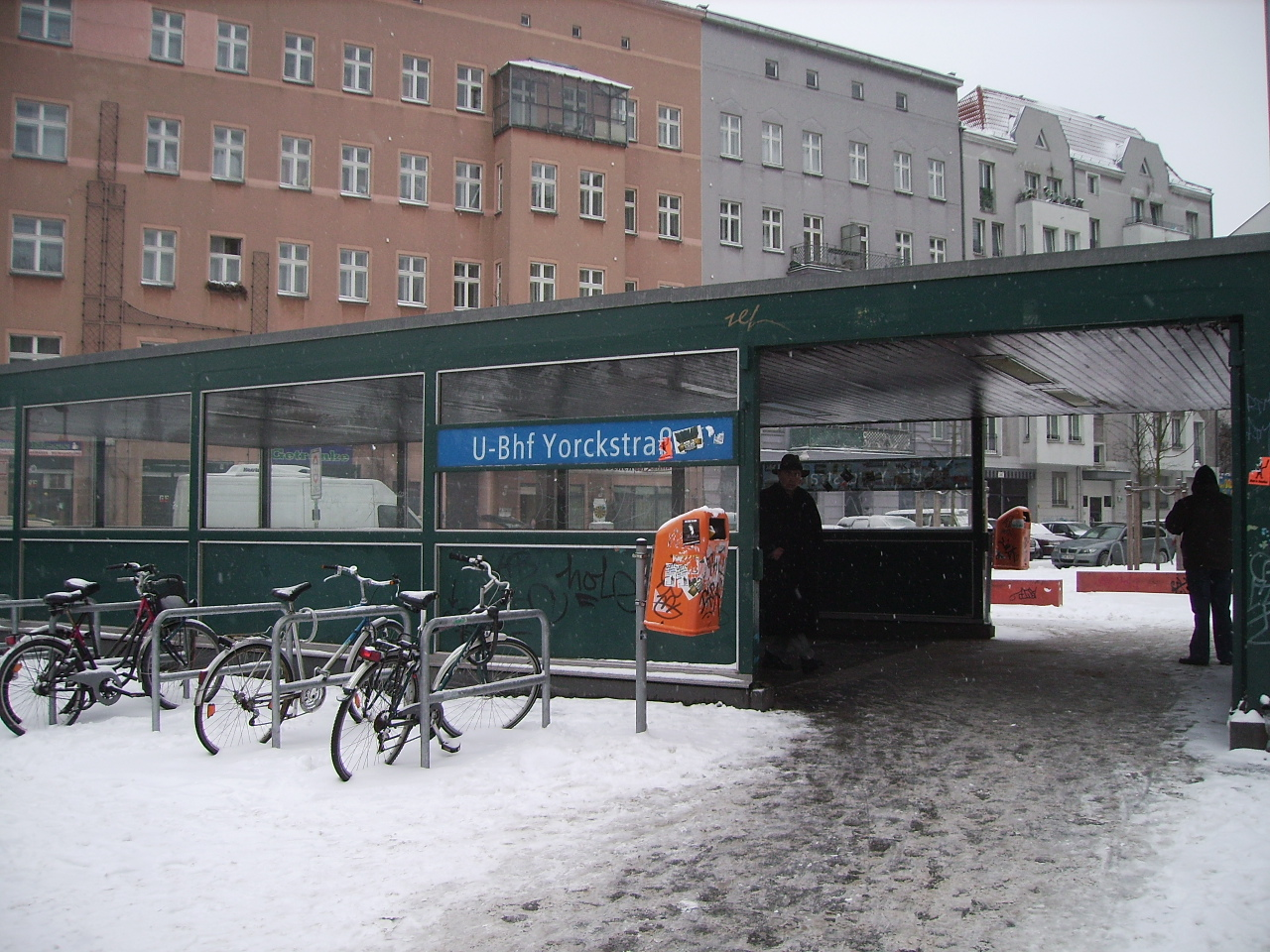
Yorckstraße U7, exit towards Yorckstraße (Großgörschenstraße) S1 (above); platform U7 (below)

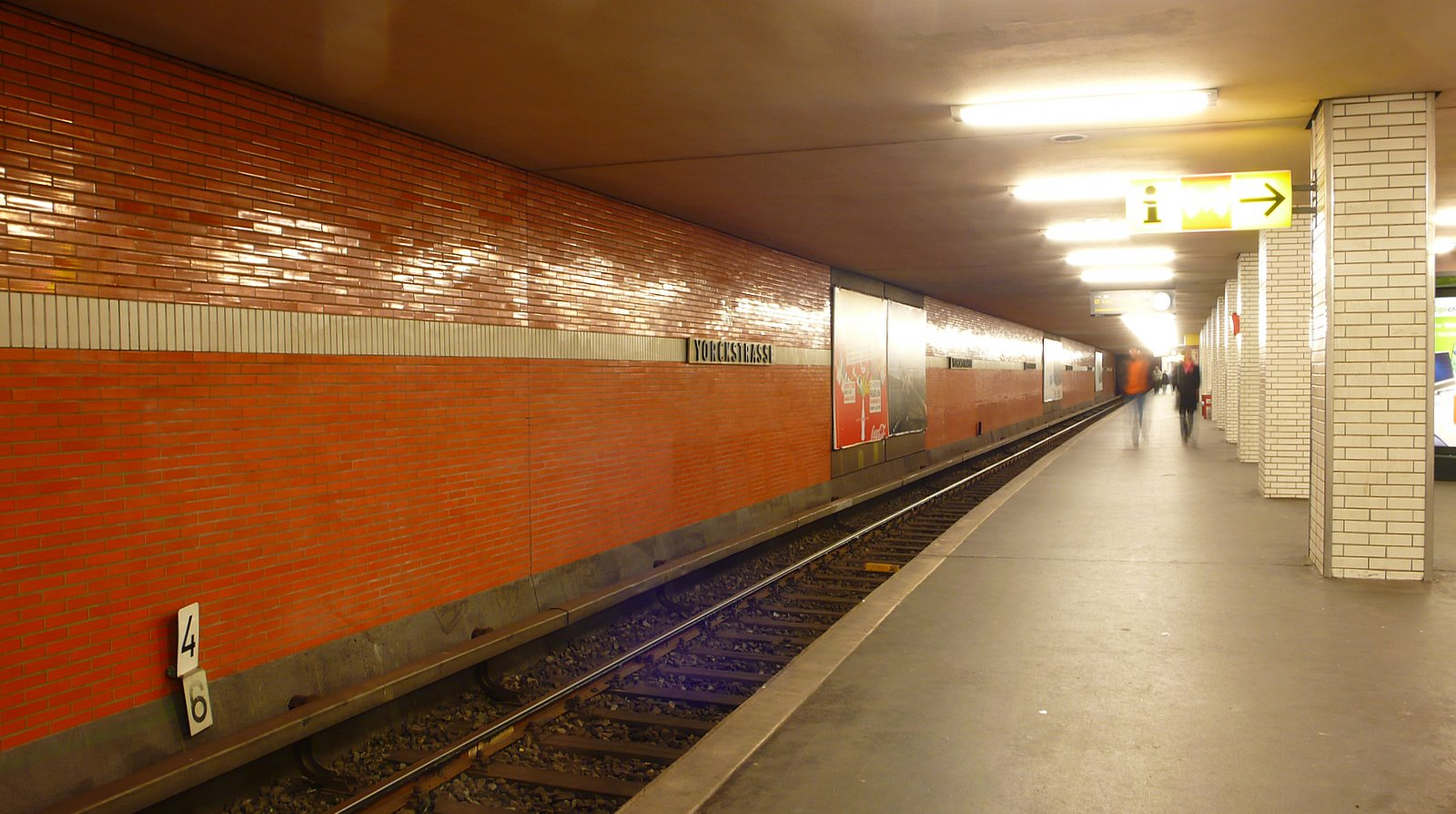

The eastern Yorckstraße S-Bahn station at the S2/S25/S26 line, opened in 1903 on the Anhalter Bahn and Dresdener Bahn line departing from Anhalter Bahnhof.

The adjacent Yorckstraße U-Bahn station of the U7 was built in 1971 by R.G. Rümmler. The underground station has two exits one each to one of the two S-Bahn stations, which are otherwise only connected by a short walk or (in the eastward direction) by bus. The next underground station in eastward direction is Möckernbrücke, where transfer is available to U1.
