= Grenzallee station =

Station of the Berlin U-Bahn

Coordinates: 52.463°N 13.445°E

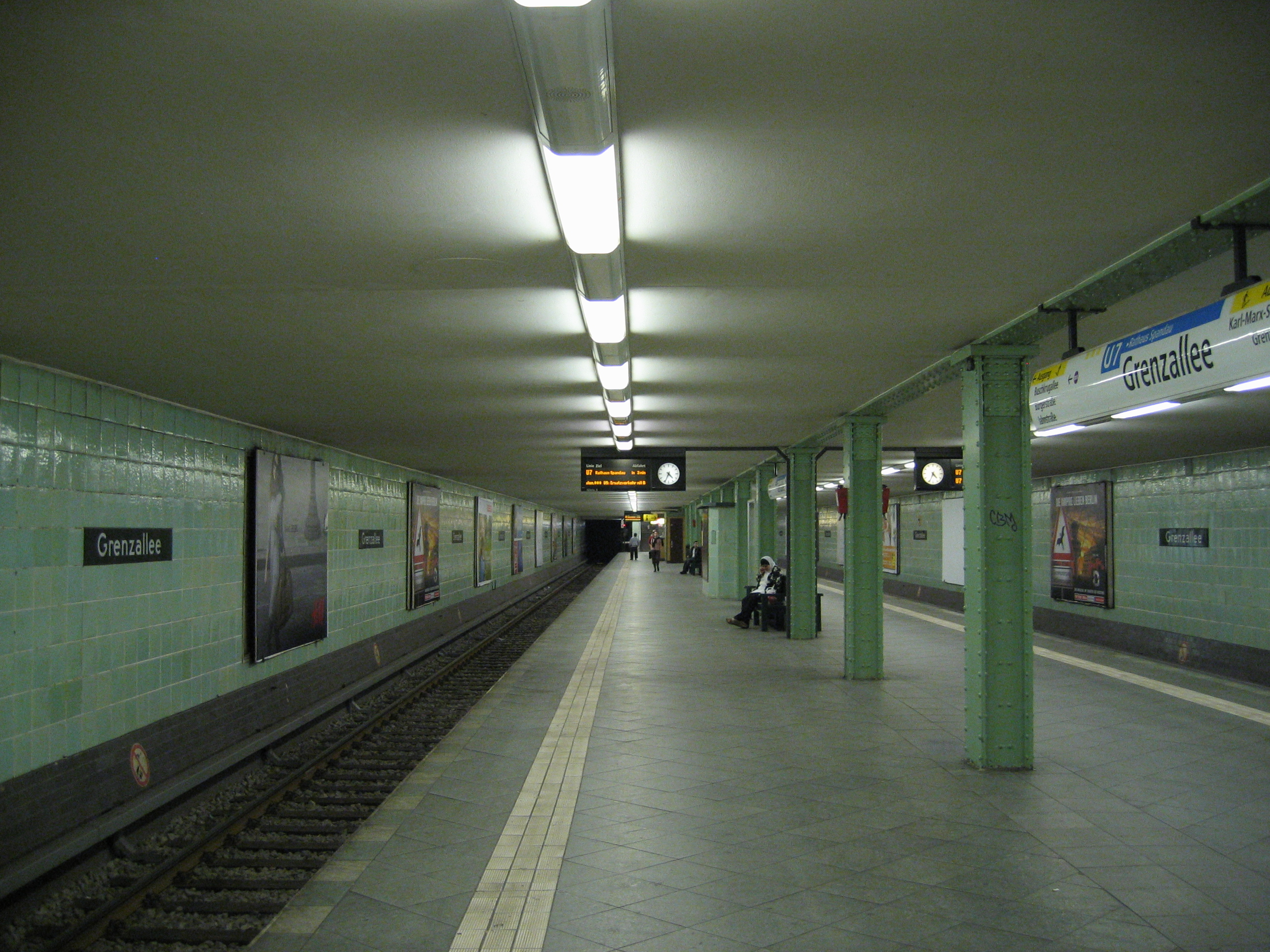
Platform view, Grenzallee U-Bahn station

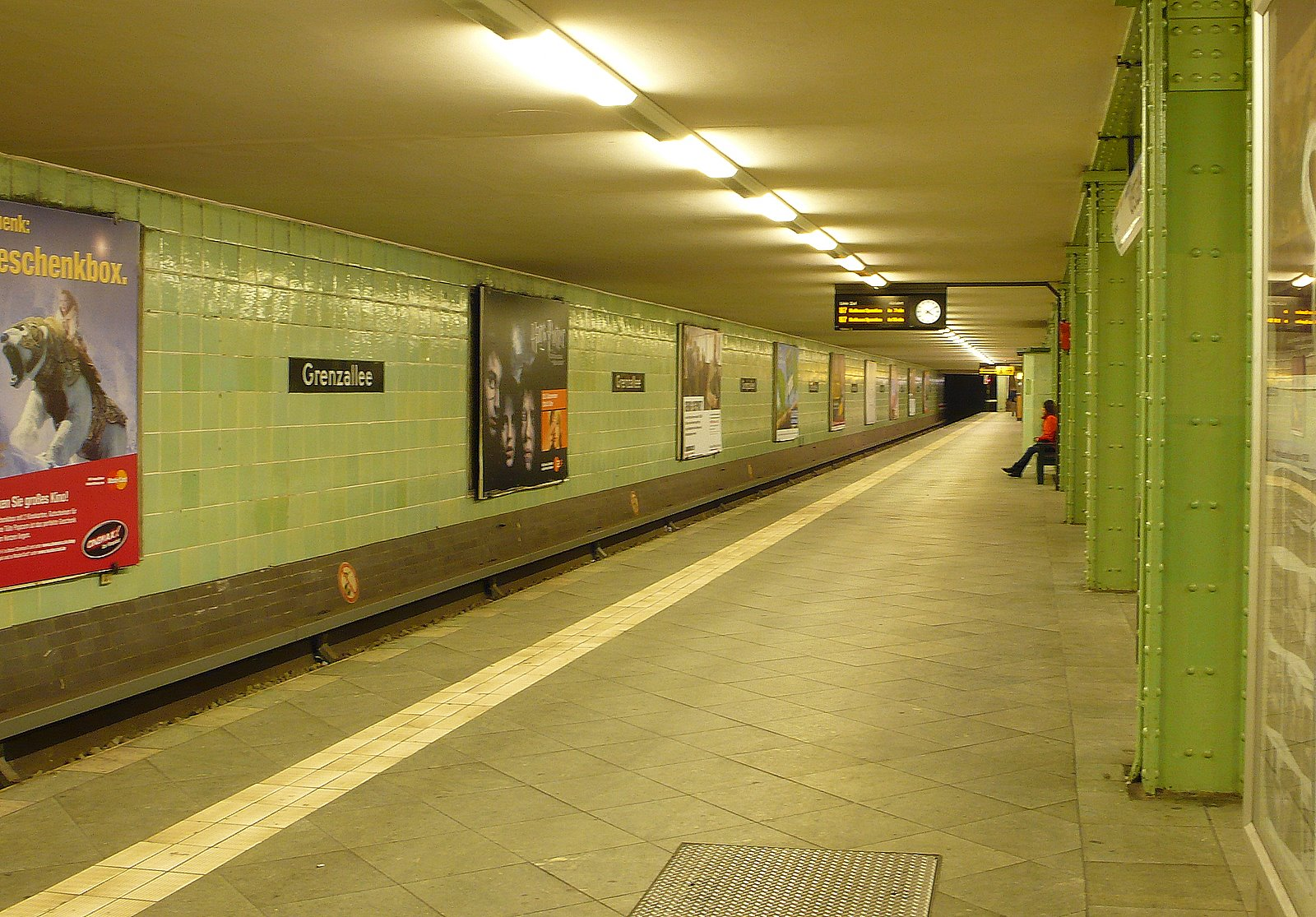
Platform view

Grenzallee is a station on the Berlin U-Bahn line U7. It is located on Buschkrugallee, Neukölln, spanning the junctions with Grenzallee and the A100 motorway. The station was opened in 1930 and built by Alfred Grenander.

== History ==
When the station opened in 1930 it was the last passenger station on Line C^{I}, which was first extended to the south in 1963.

The station was not initially directly affected by the Second World War. However, it was out of operation for a period from 1944 to 1945, when the Berliner Verkehrsbetriebe (BVG) shortened the route of Line C to terminate at Bergstraße (now Karl-Marx-Straße), renting the tunnel and two stations to the south for use by the arms company Henschel-Flugwerke.

== Sources ==
- berliner-untergrundbahn.de

Preceding station	Berlin U-Bahn	Following station
Neukölln towards Rathaus Spandau	U7	Blaschkoallee towards Rudow
