= Möckernbrücke station =

Station of the Berlin U-Bahn

Möckernbrücke
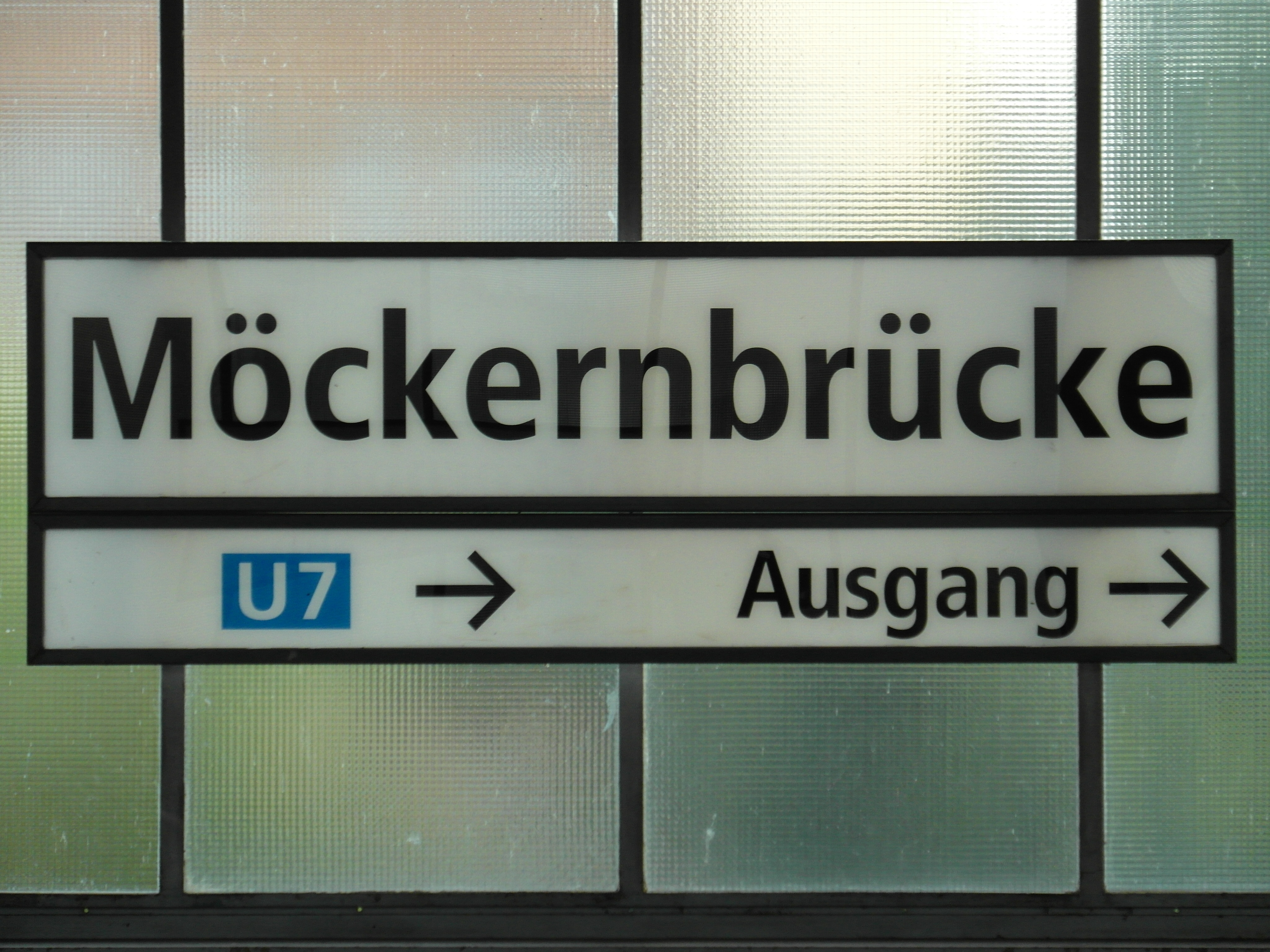

General information
- Location: Möckernbrücke; Kreuzberg, Berlin; Germany
- Coordinates: 52°29′57″N 13°22′58″E
- Owner: Berliner Verkehrsbetriebe
- Operator: Berliner Verkehrsbetriebe
- Platforms: 2 side platforms (U1/U3); 1 island platform (U7)
- Tracks: 4
- Train operators: Berliner Verkehrsbetriebe
- Connections: : N1

Construction
- Structure type: Elevated (U1/U3); Underground (U7)
- Cycle facilities: Yes
- Accessible: No

Other information
- Fare zone: : Berlin A/5555

History
- Opened: 18 February 1902; 124 years ago

Services
Preceding station	Berlin U-Bahn	Following station
Gleisdreieck towards Uhlandstraße	U1	Hallesches Tor towards Warschauer Straße
Gleisdreieck towards Krumme Lanke	U3	Hallesches Tor towards Warschauer Straße
Yorckstraße towards Rathaus Spandau	U7	Mehringdamm towards Rudow
Route map
U1/U3 station
U7 station
Location
- Location within Berlin

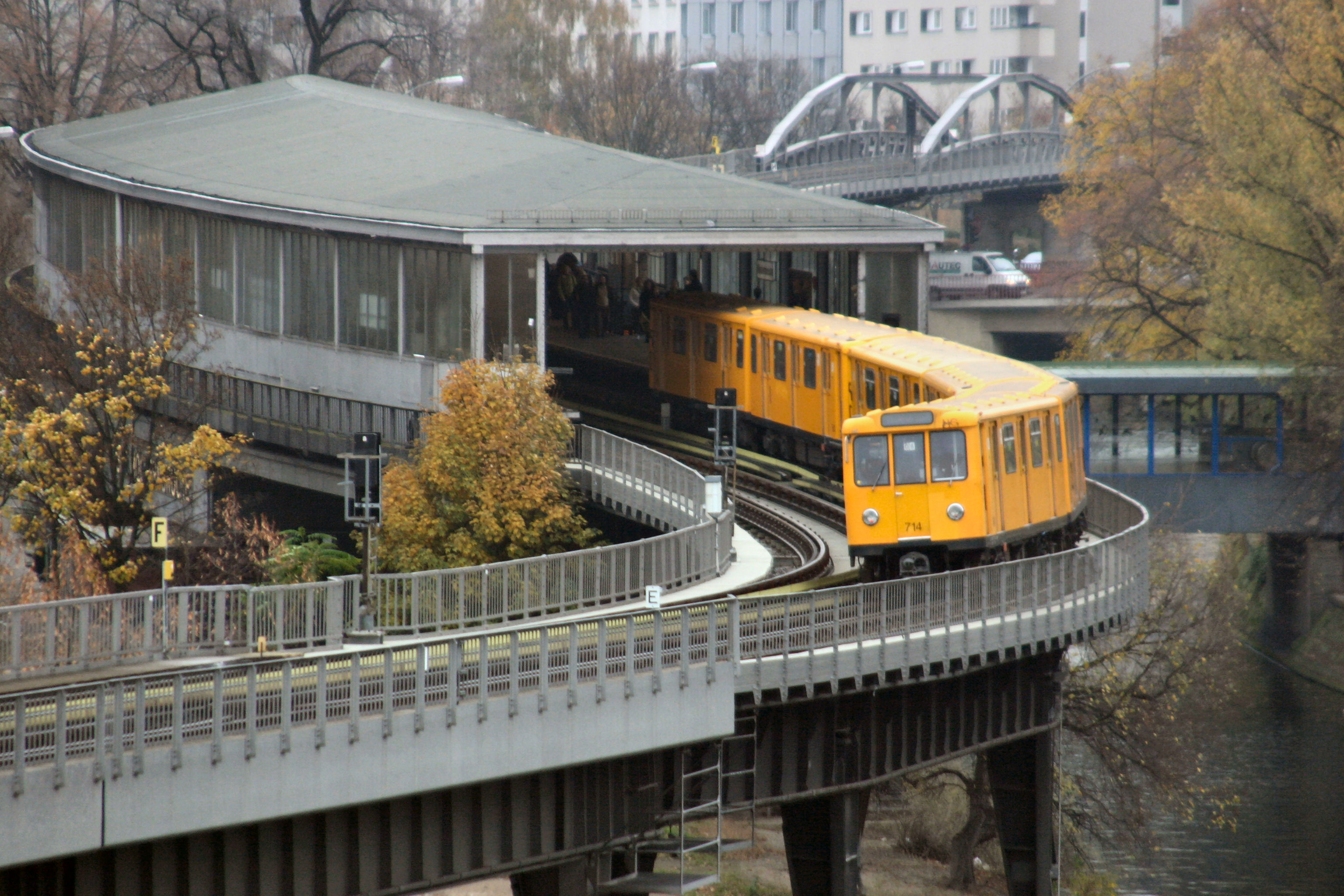
U1 train to Warschauer Straße entering Möckernbrücke

Möckernbrücke is a station of the Berlin U-Bahn network in the western Kreuzberg district, in the vicinity of Potsdamer Platz, named after a nearby bridge crossing the Landwehrkanal. It is served by lines U1, U3, and U7.

== Overview ==
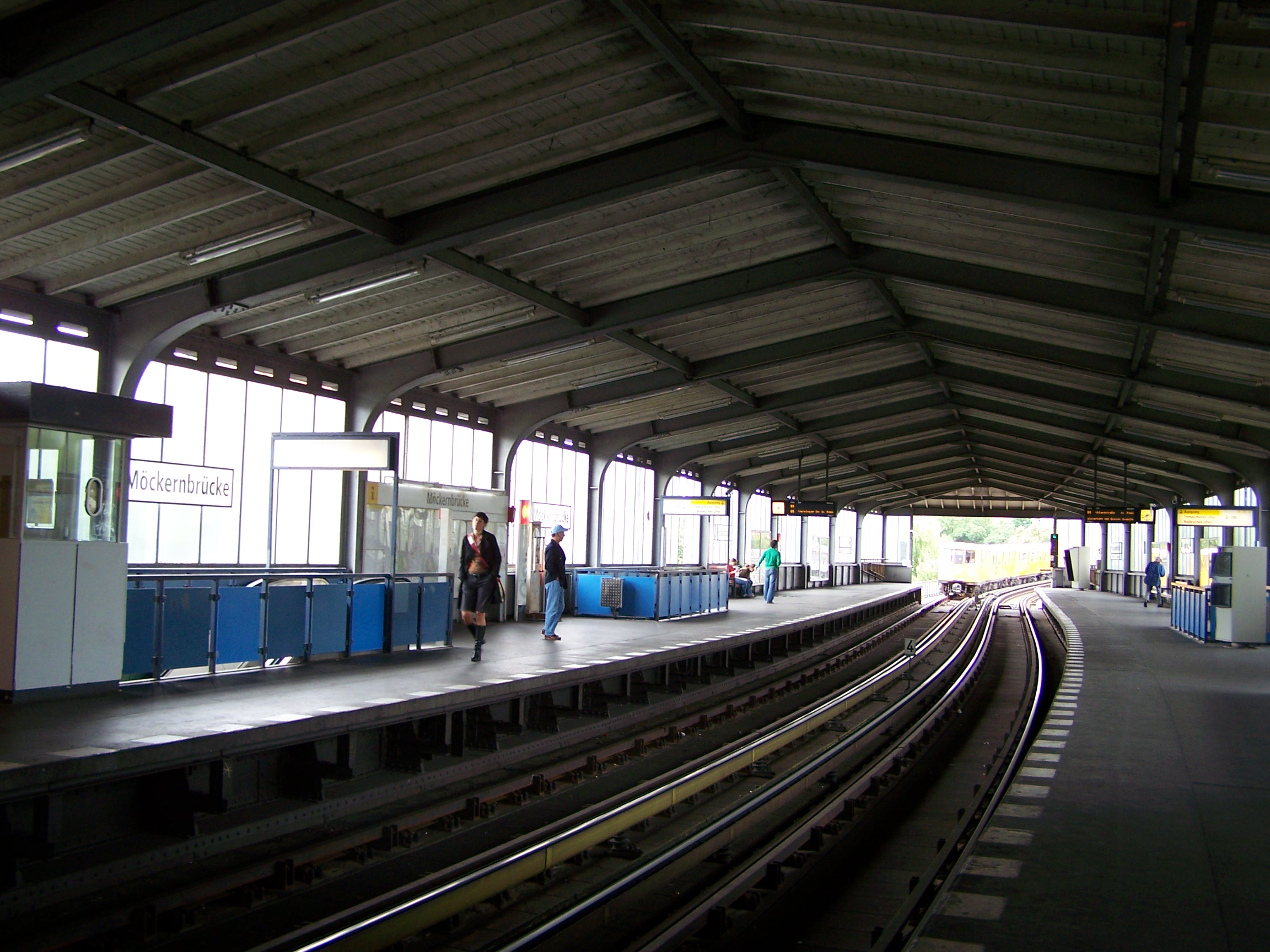
U1/U3 platforms

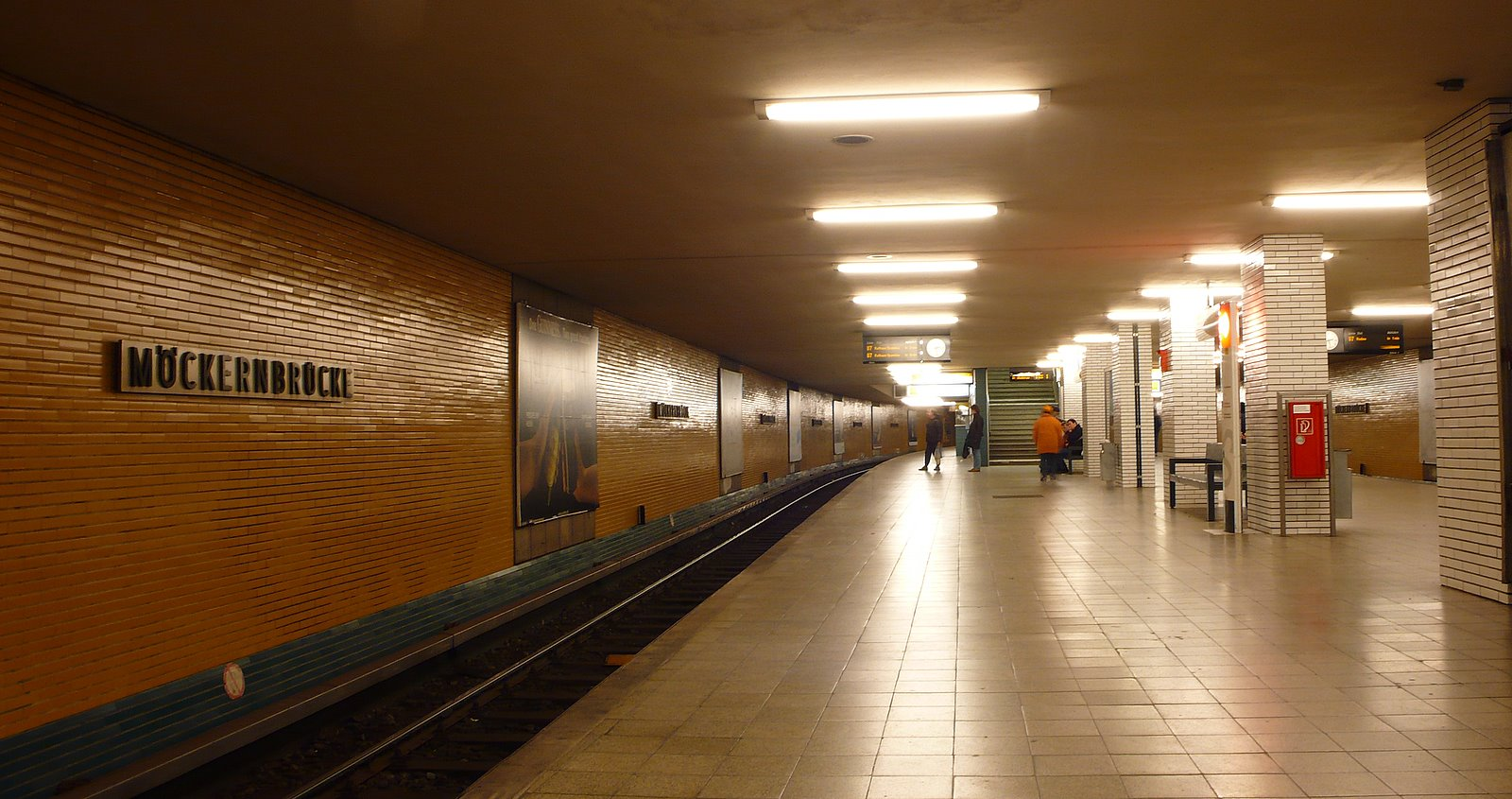
U7 platform

The station, located on a viaduct at the northern shore of the Landwehrkanal, is part of the first Stammstrecke route of the U-Bahn, opened on 15 February 1902. As the station also served the nearby Anhalter Bahnhof, the original building soon got too small to cope with the rising number of passengers. It therefore was demolished and replaced by the current station, opened on 25 March 1937. Severely damaged by air raids, it was closed on 30 January 1944 and not reopened until 16 June 1947.

In the course of the extension of the U7 from Mehringdamm to the west, a twin underground station was built at the southern shore of the Landwehrkanal. The U7 platform opened on 28 February 1966 (architect Rümmler) Möckernbrücke became the line's western terminus until the second continuation to Fehrbelliner Platz on 29 January 1971. The U1/U3 and U7 platforms are connected by a glazed bridge over the Landwehrkanal.

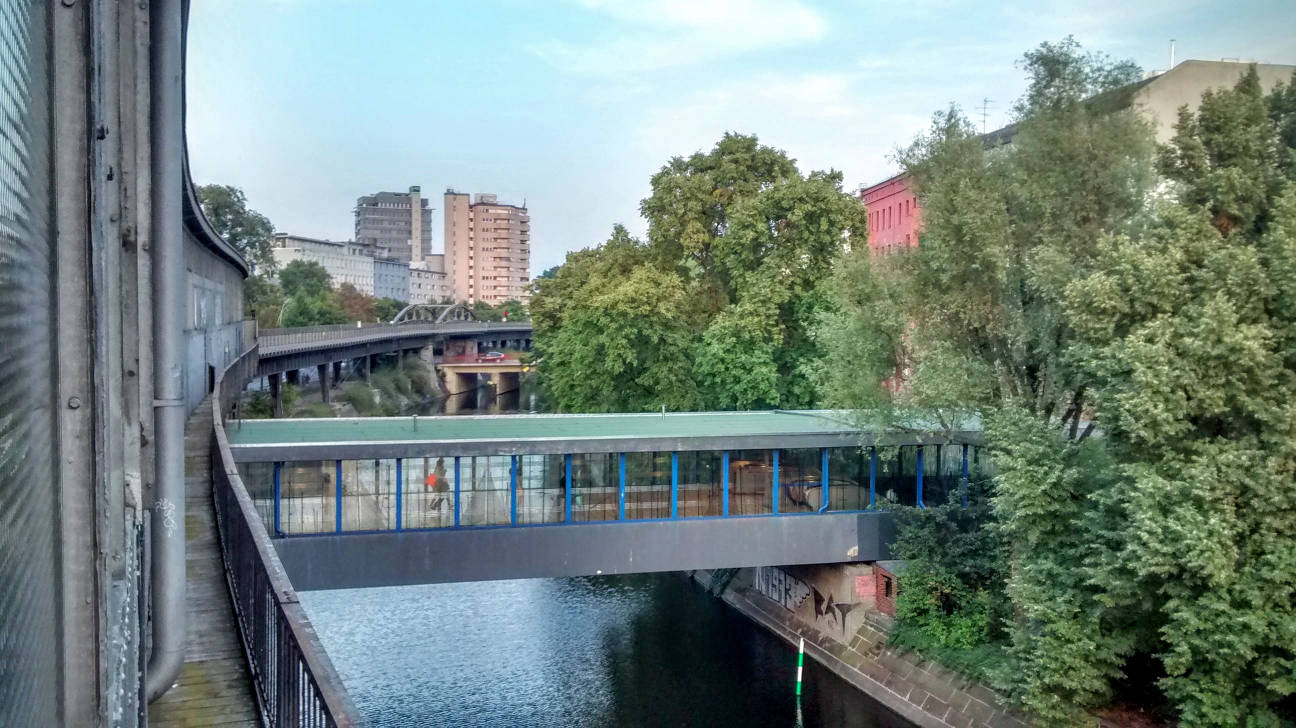
Glazed bridge over the Landwehrkanal
