= Mehringdamm =

Street in southern Kreuzberg, Berlin

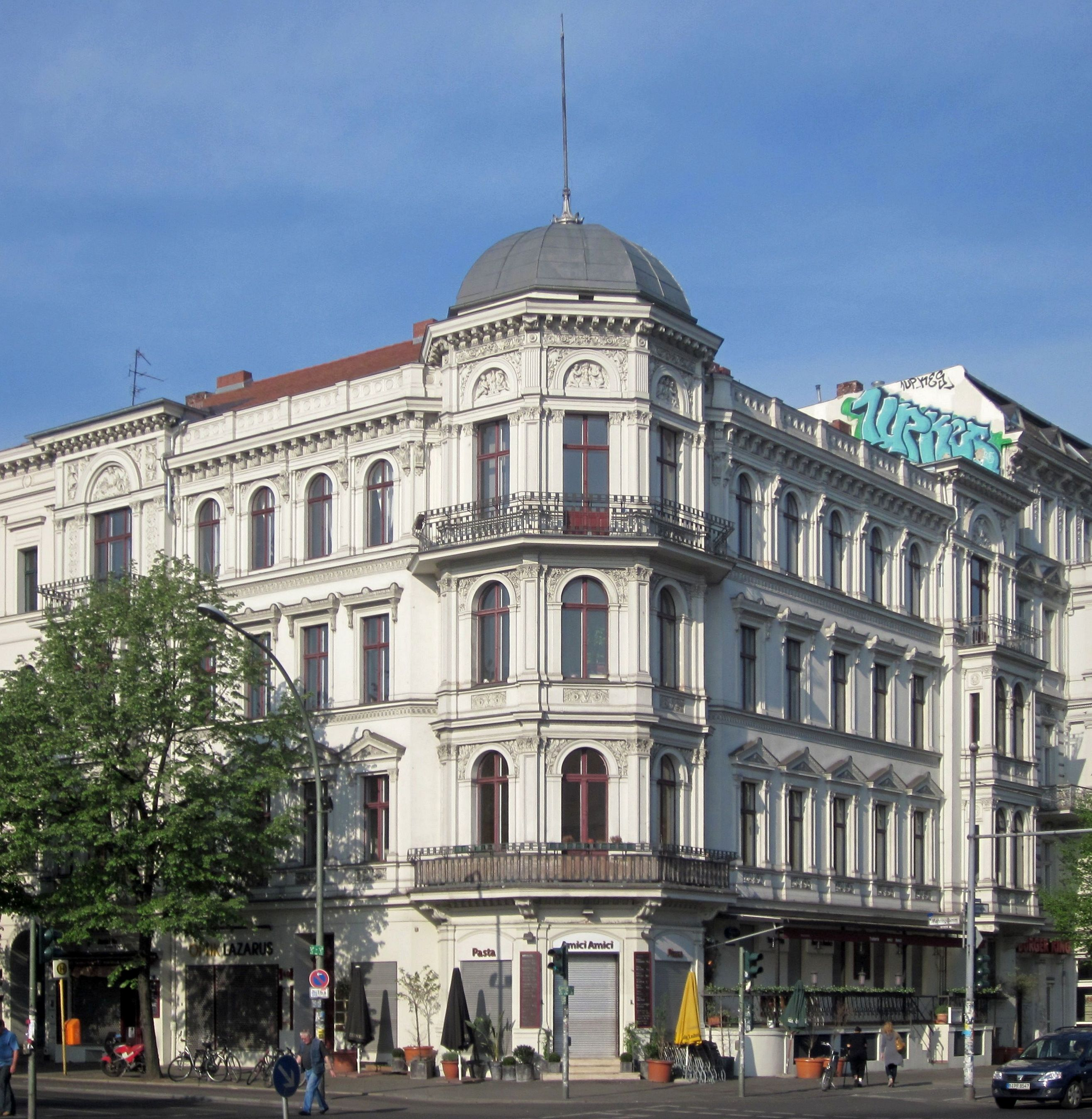
- Block of flats, built in 1868, on Mehringdamm 40 at the corner of Yorckstraße
- Interactive map of Mehringdamm
- Former names: Tempelhofer Straße; (1837–1864); Belle-Alliance-Straße; (1864–1946); Franz-Mehring-Straße; (1946–1947)
- Part of: Bundesstraße 96
- Namesake: Franz Mehring
- Type: Street
- Length: 1,500 m (4,900 ft)
- Location: Berlin, Germany
- Quarter: Kreuzberg, Tempelhof
- Nearest metro station: Hallesches Tor; Mehringdamm; Platz der Luftbrücke
- Coordinates: 52°29′30″N 13°23′14″E
- North end: Wilhelmstrasse; Mehring Bridge; Tempelhofer Ufer
- Major junctions: Obentrautstraße; Blücherstraße; Yorckstraße; Gneisenaustraße; Hagelberger Straße; Kreuzbergstraße; Bergmannstraße; Fidicinstraße
- South end: Dudenstraße; Platz der Luftbrücke; Columbiadamm; Tempelhofer Damm

The Mehringdamm is a street in southern Kreuzberg, Berlin. In the north it starts at Mehringbrücke and ends - with its southernmost houses already belonging to Tempelhof locality - on Platz der Luftbrücke. It is the historical southbound Berlin-Halle highway, now forming the federal route 96. The main junction of Mehringdamm is with the 19th-century ring road around Berlin's inner city, named Yorckstraße west, and Gneisenaustraße east of Mehringdamm.

== History ==
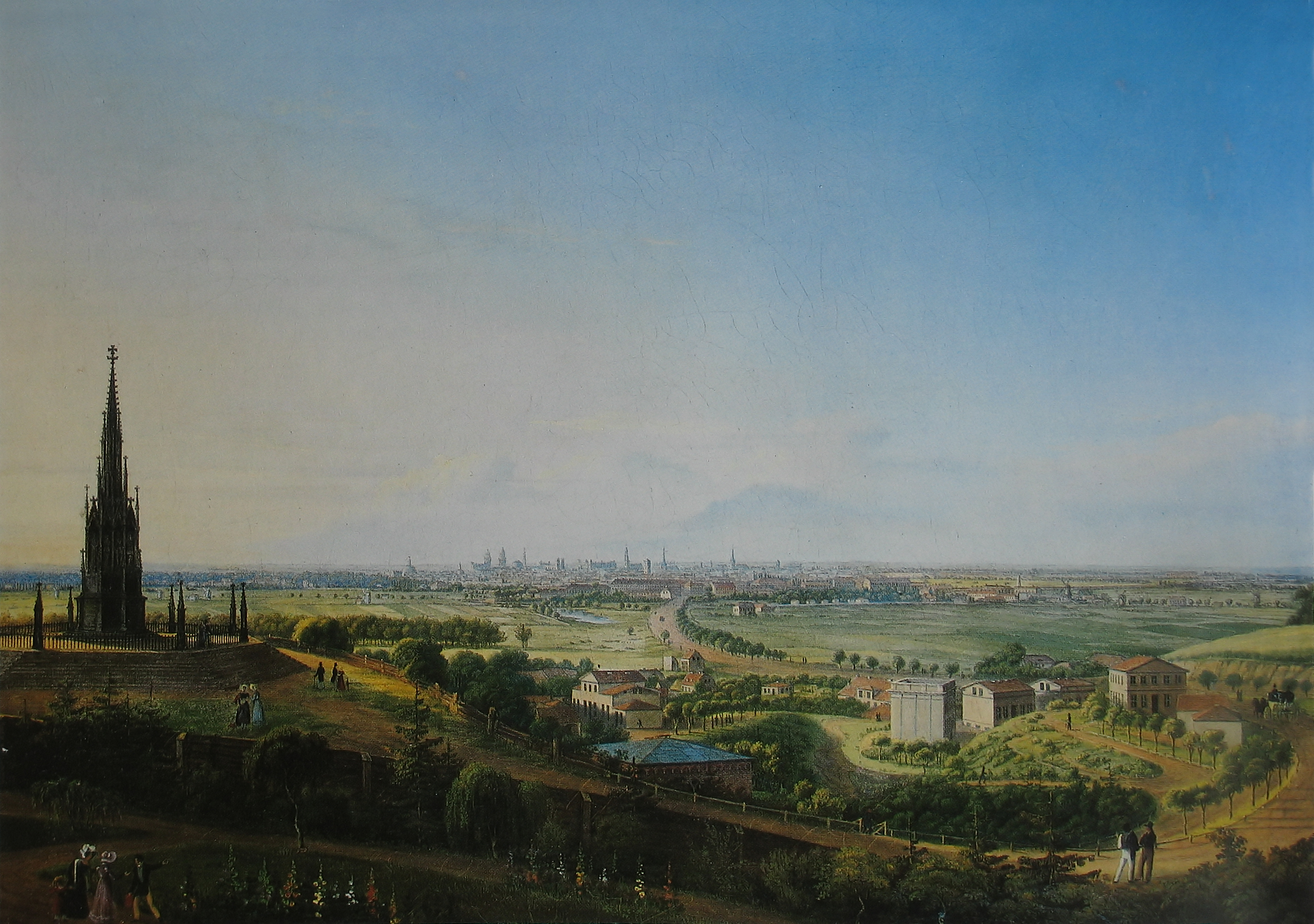
View in 1829 from the Kreuzberg northwards downhill over what is today's Tempelhofer Vorstadt with the then Berlin-Halle highway, today's Mehringdamm.

The highway from Cölln (since 1710 a part of Berlin) to Halle upon Saale and Leipzig traverses the quarter of Tempelhofer Vorstadt (Bezirksregion II {borough region II} of Friedrichshain-Kreuzberg) from north to south on a length of 3 km (1.9 mi). Before it was paved, horses and coaches going up the highway to the level of the Teltow Plateau, rising between Bergmannstraße and Fidicinstraße by 14 m (46 ft), rutted the road into many parallel lanes. Since the early 18th century, the Tempelhof Field on the Teltow Plateau served as a military exercising and parade ground with annual military reviews. The Berlin-Halle highway was extended to allow cavalrymen and infantrymen from several barracks in Berlin easy access to the Tempelhof Field (after 1923 Tempelhof Airport). The western half of the actual street remained an unpaved sand strip starting at the former Dragoons' Barracks on Mehringdamm 20–25 (today's Tax Office) until up to the Tempelhof Field.

With the gradual suburbanisation of the area south of the Belle-Alliance-Platz (Rondeel till 1815) outside of the Halle Gate denser construction started on today's Mehringdamm which was thus officially given a name on 20 April 1837, namely Tempelhofer Straße, after its next southern destination the then village of Tempelhof. On the same occasion the junction of Tempelhofer Straße with other streets radially connecting to the Halle Gate was renamed Platz vor dem Hallischen Tor, and again Blücherplatz on 7 April 1884.

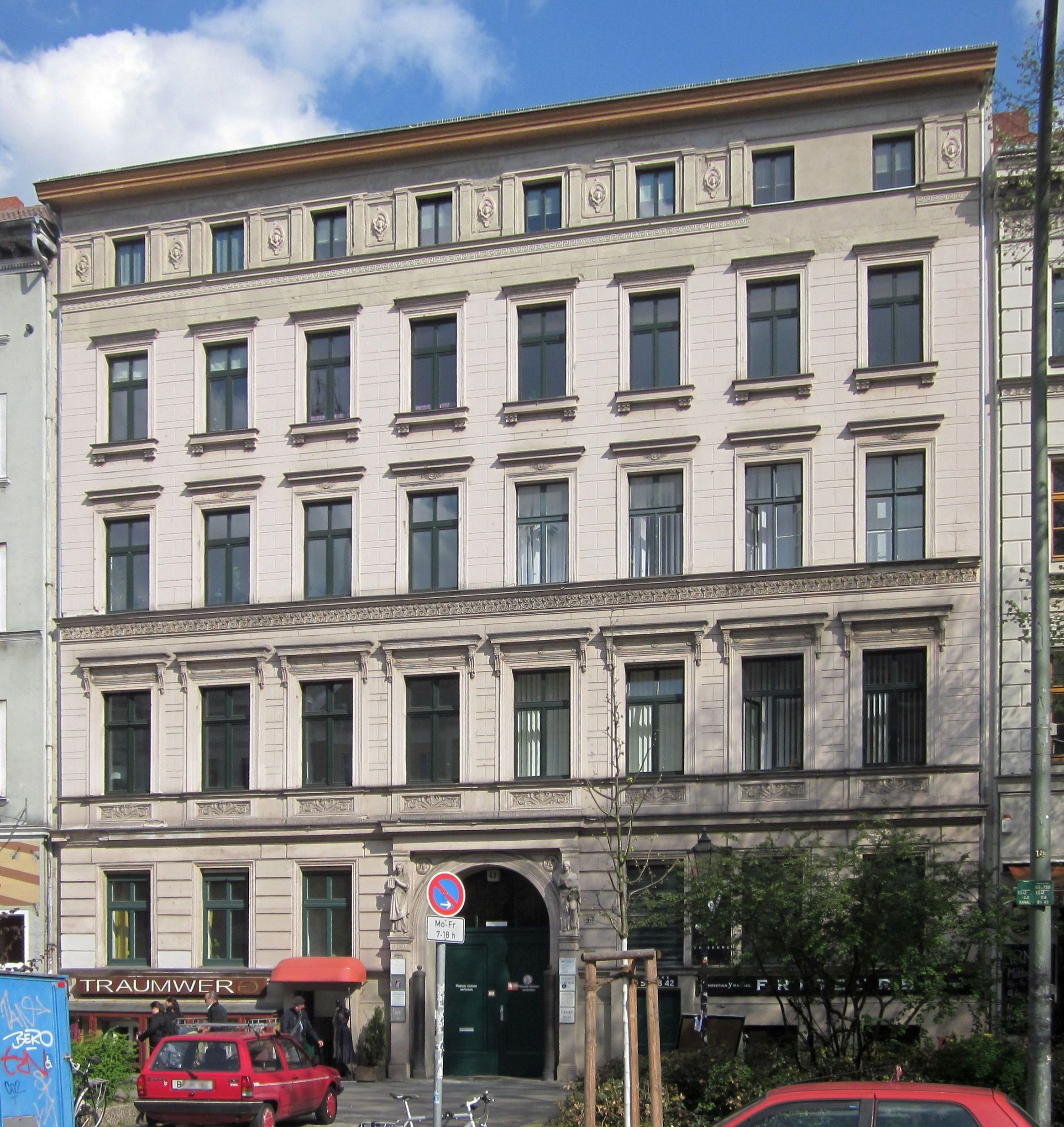
Former H. Berthold Type Foundry, built in 1859, Mehringdamm 43

With effect from 1 January 1861, the street and the adjacent sites, alleys and fields around were seceded from Tempelhof and incorporated into Berlin, which formed in this new southern quarter of the city's then 16 quarters, namely the Tempelhofer Vorstadt (i.e. Tempelhof-bound Suburb). On 27 November 1864 the Tempelhofer Straße was – in analogy to Belle-Alliance-Platz – renamed Belle-Alliance-Straße, thus spreading southwards the name of the First French Empire chief command post La Belle Alliance in the Battle of Waterloo, therefore named Battle of Belle Alliance in Prussian historiography. Following a royal Most-Supreme Cabinet Order (Allerhöchste Cabinets-Ordre) all streets newly laid out right and left of Belle-Alliance-Straße were named after battles won against Napoleon and commanders who distinguished themselves in these battles. In the 1880s, the street became an avenue by planting nettle trees in the section between Yorckstraße and Dudenstraße, with some of them – such as near Fidicinstraße junction – still standing, meanwhile under nature protection.

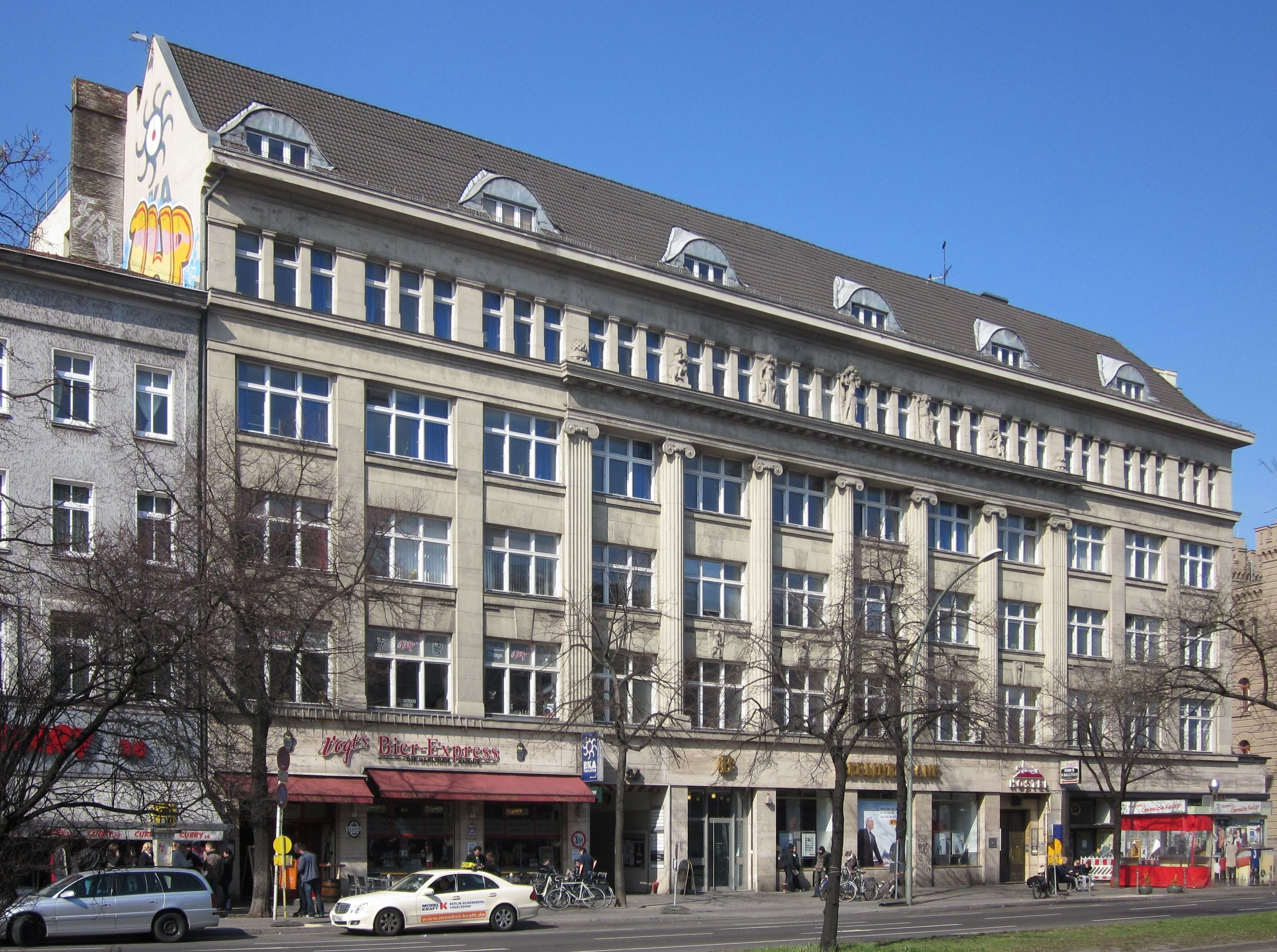
Industriehaus Becker & Kries, built in 1913–1914, Mehringdamm 34 next to the underground, also housing the BKA-Theater

From 1896, the electric tramway connected Treptow in the east and Berlin Zoological Garden in the west passing Belle-Alliance-Straße between Halle Gate and Yorckstraße. In 1924 and 1926, respectively, the Berlin underground opened the underground stations Belle-Alliance-Straße (Mehringdamm as of 1947) and Kreuzberg (Flughafen between 1937 and 1975; Platz der Luftbrücke since) on its north–south directed C line (a.k.a. Nord-Süd-Bahn; mostly today's U7).

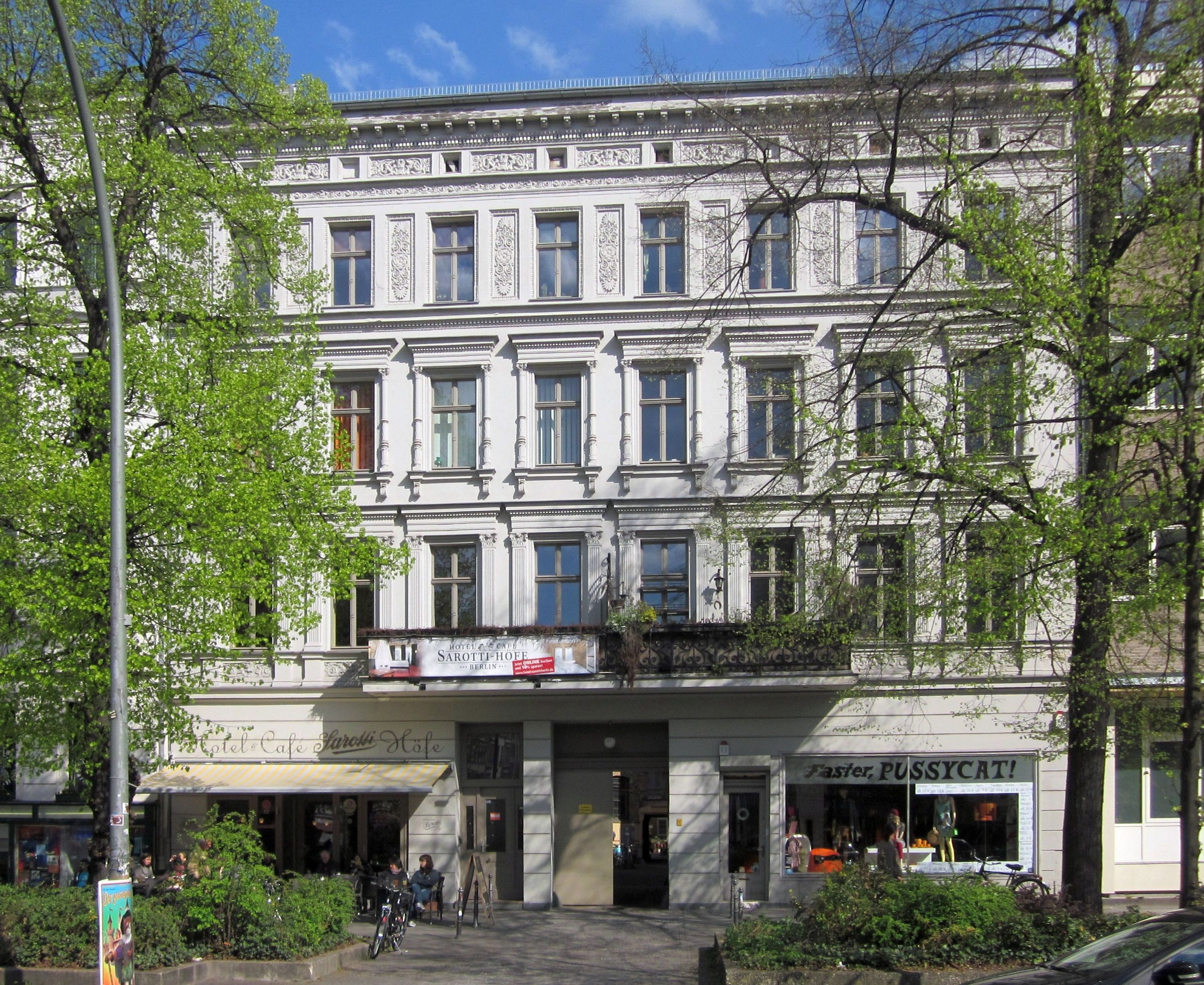
Front-building Mehringdamm 53 built in 1862, between 1882 and 1913 used as Sarotti Chocolate Factory

On 30 January 1944, in the course of the airborne Battle of Berlin, a British air raid destroyed much of the western alignment of houses on southern Belle-Alliance-Straße, also hitting southern Großbeerenstraße, parts of Victoria Park and Methfesselstraße. On 30 January 1945, a British night air raid destroyed many buildings around the northern end of the street, including Adolf Jandorf's former department store and Fontane's former house and many graves in the adjacent cemeteries.

On 16 February 1946, the Belle-Alliance-Straße and its then northern end, the square Belle-Alliance-Platz, were renamed Franz-Mehring-Straße and Franz-Mehring-Platz, on 31 July 1947 both names were simplified to Mehringdamm and Mehringplatz. Both are named after the socialist historian Franz Mehring. On the occasion of renaming, the numbering of the houses was changed too from traditional Berlin style (starting on one side of the street counting up to its end, continuing then on the other side until reaching the beginning again) to international numbering mode (even numbers on the one and odd on the opposite side). The only unchanged number was No. 1, Adolf Jandorf's former department store, reconstructed by Hans Soll as part of the Hertie chain between 1952 and 1956.

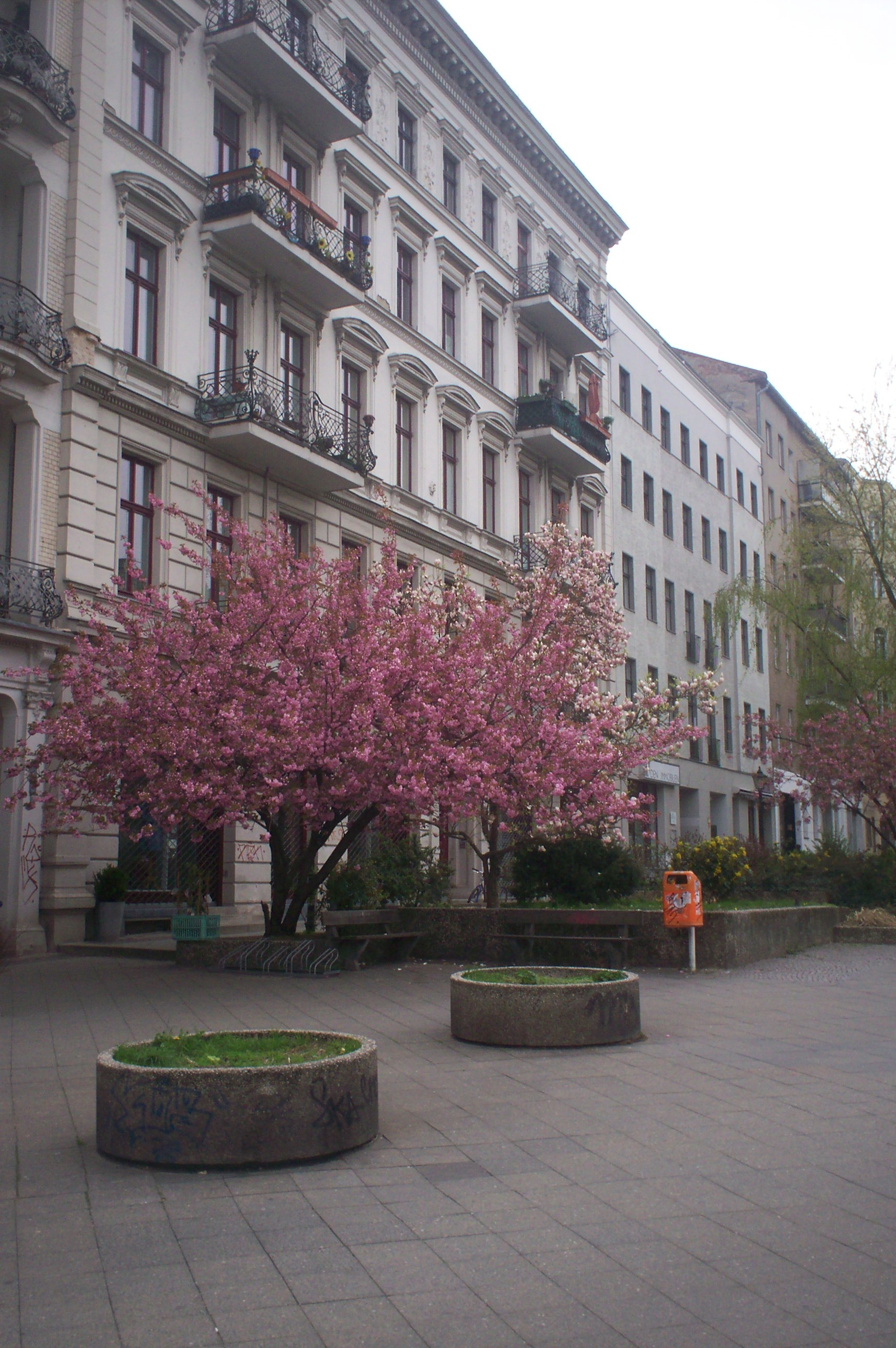
Block of flats on Mehringdamm 75

In 1975, the northern end of the Mehringdamm was deviated from Halle Gate and its two adjacent squares Mehringplatz (northerly), and Blücherplatz (southerly), the latter forming a dead end since including the former northern end of Mehringdamm. The westerly reguided new northern route of the Mehringdamm, opened on 2 September 1974, connects to the inner ring road, bridging via the 1975-built Mehringbrücke over the Landwehr Canal, and to Wilhelmstraße beyond the canal.

== Sights ==
At Mehringdamm 61 you'll find the SchwulenZentrum, a gay center with cafe Melitta Sundström, the clubs SchwuZ and AHA and the former location of Schwules Museum.

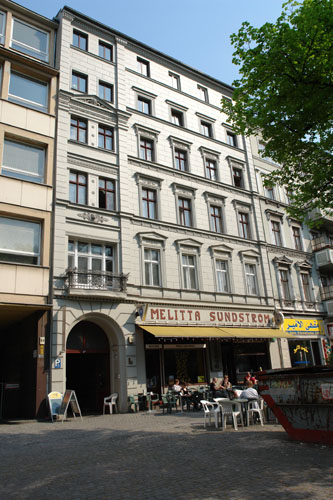
Gay café Melitta Sundström

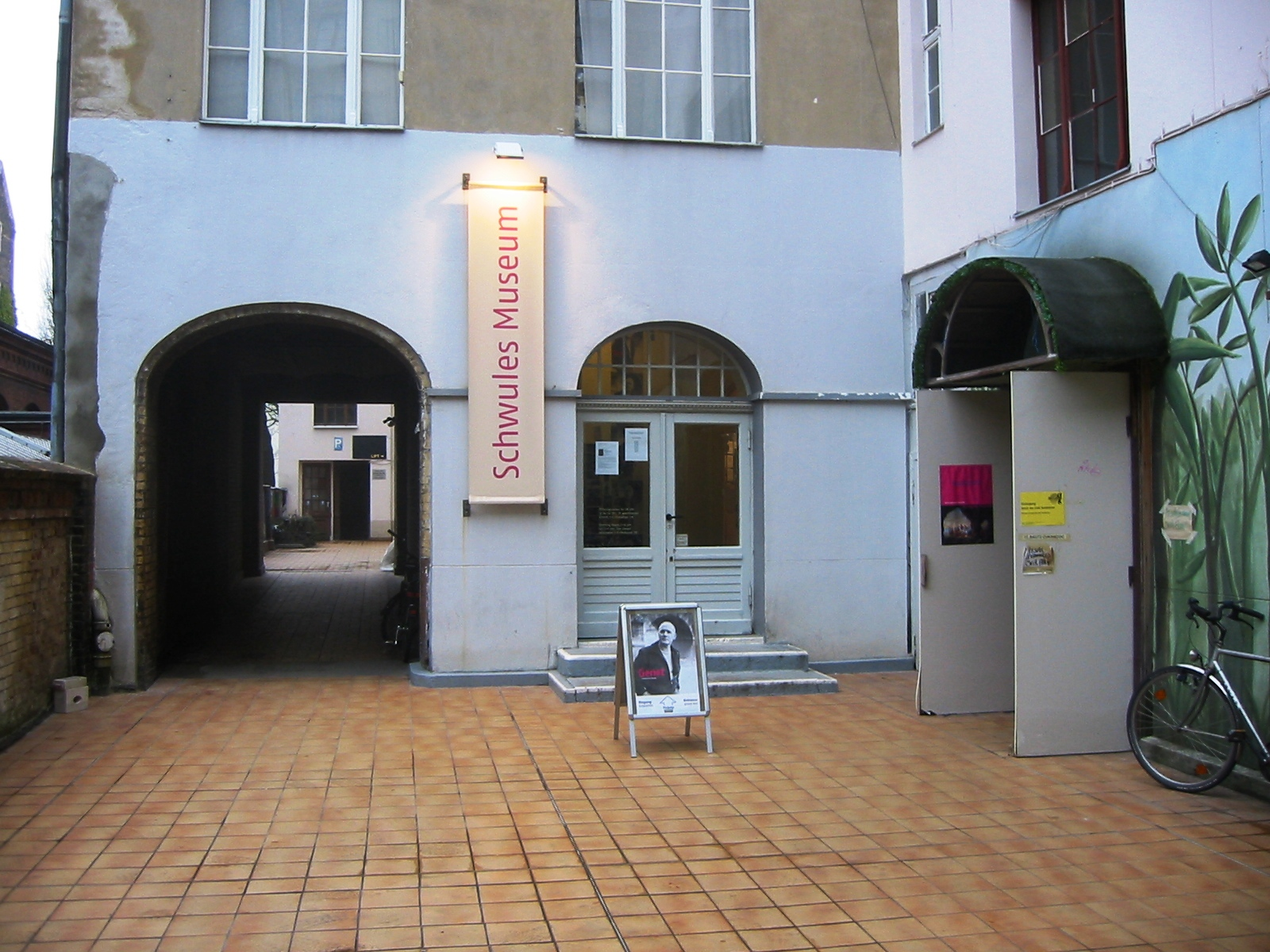
Gay museum Schwules Museum on Mehringdamm

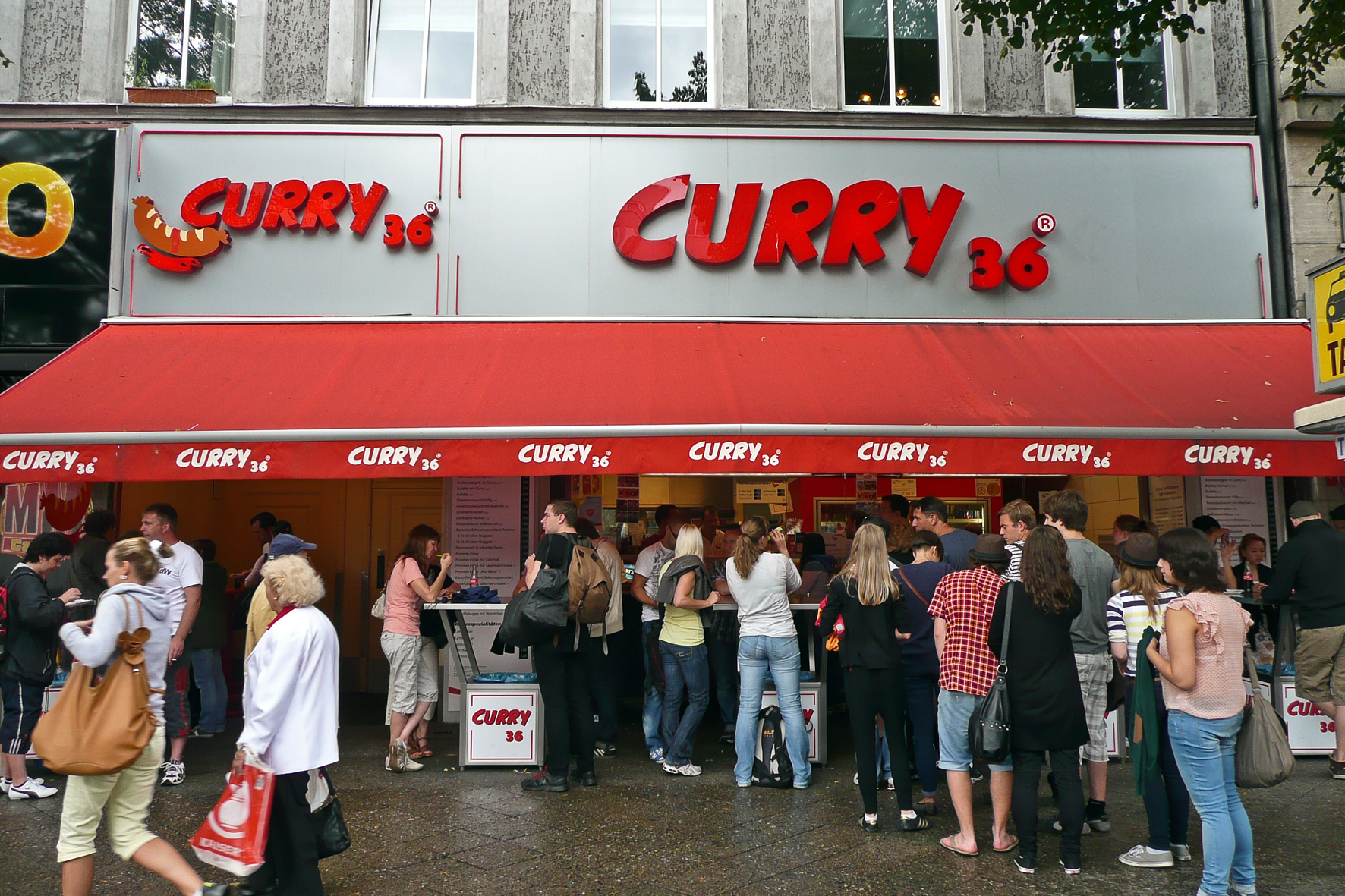
Curry 36

== Notable residents ==
- Gottfried Benn, the dermatologist and poet, practised and lived between 1917 and 1935 at Belle-Alliance-Straße 12 (renamed and renumbered Mehringdamm 38). In an interview he stated: As to your survey I answer you that I would not like to live anywhere else but in the Belle-Alliance-Straße. Everything else is a utopia for someone of my age.
- Theodor Fontane, realist novelist and poet, in 1859 moved with his family into a flat in a newly built house at Tempelhofer Straße 51. The then housing shortage enabled the owners of flats in Berlin to rent them out before the houses had thoroughly dried. In a letter to his mother Fontane reported that his son fell ill for eight days after moving in, since the humidity was still escaping from the walls. While living at Tempelhofer Straße 51 Fontane began his rambles through the March of Brandenburg, which he literarily compiled and published as Wanderungen durch die Mark Brandenburg (1862–89), before moving out again after, in 1863, the owner had told them to leave.
- Leopold Wölfling, the former Tuscan crown prince styled Archduke Leopold till 1903, lived beginning in 1928 in the Tempelhofer Vorstadt. He died impoverished in 1935 at home in his rear wing flat on Belle-Alliance-Straße 53 (renamed and renumbered Mehringdamm 119). Beginning in late 1932 he wrote a series of articles on his life as an archduke published in the Berliner Morgenpost, starting on 2 October with an article against the spreading racism under the headline "Es gibt keine Rassen-Reinheit. Mitteleuropa der große Schmelztiegel" (There is no racial purity. Central Europe the great melting pot). His grave is preserved in the Protestant cemetery on Mehringdamm 21.
