= Blaschkoallee station =

Urban transit station in Germany

Coordinates: 52°27′09″N 13°26′57″E

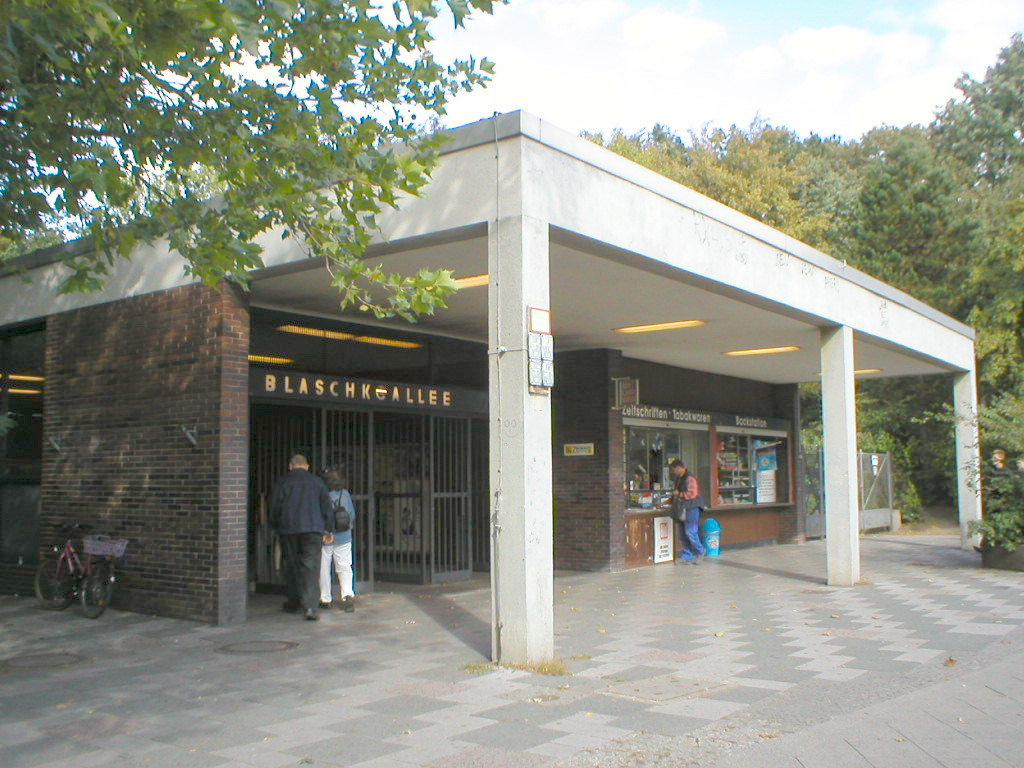
The entrance U-Bahn station Blaschkoallee

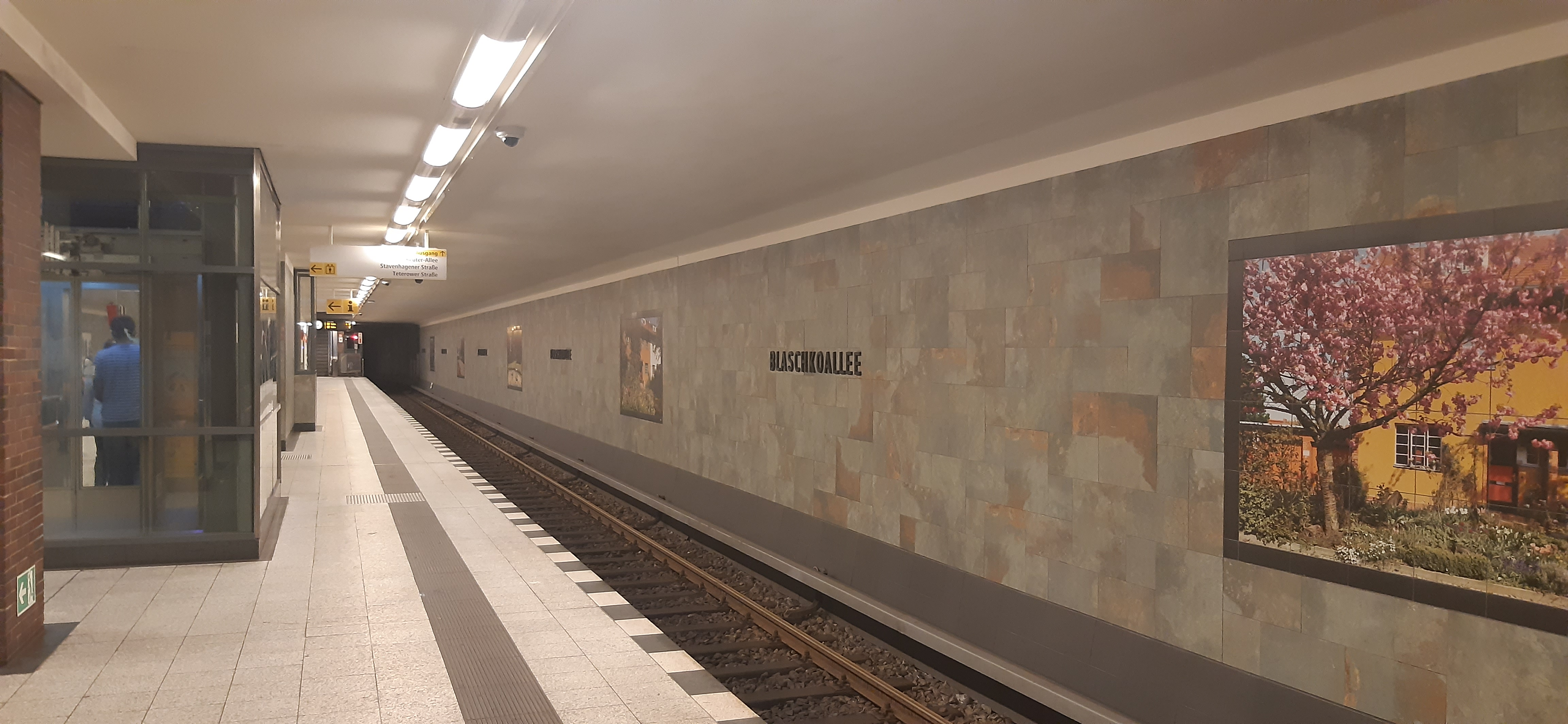
Platform view

Blaschkoallee is a Berlin U-Bahn station located on the U7. It was opened in 1963 with the planned name "Buschkrug" (arch. W.Düttmann). It was constructed by West Germany. The next station is Parchimer Allee.

| Preceding station | Berlin U-Bahn | Following station |
|---|---|---|
| Grenzallee towards Rathaus Spandau | U7 | Parchimer Allee towards Rudow |
