= Mehringdamm station =

Station of the Berlin U-Bahn

Coordinates: 52°29′40″N 13°23′19″E

Mehringdamm
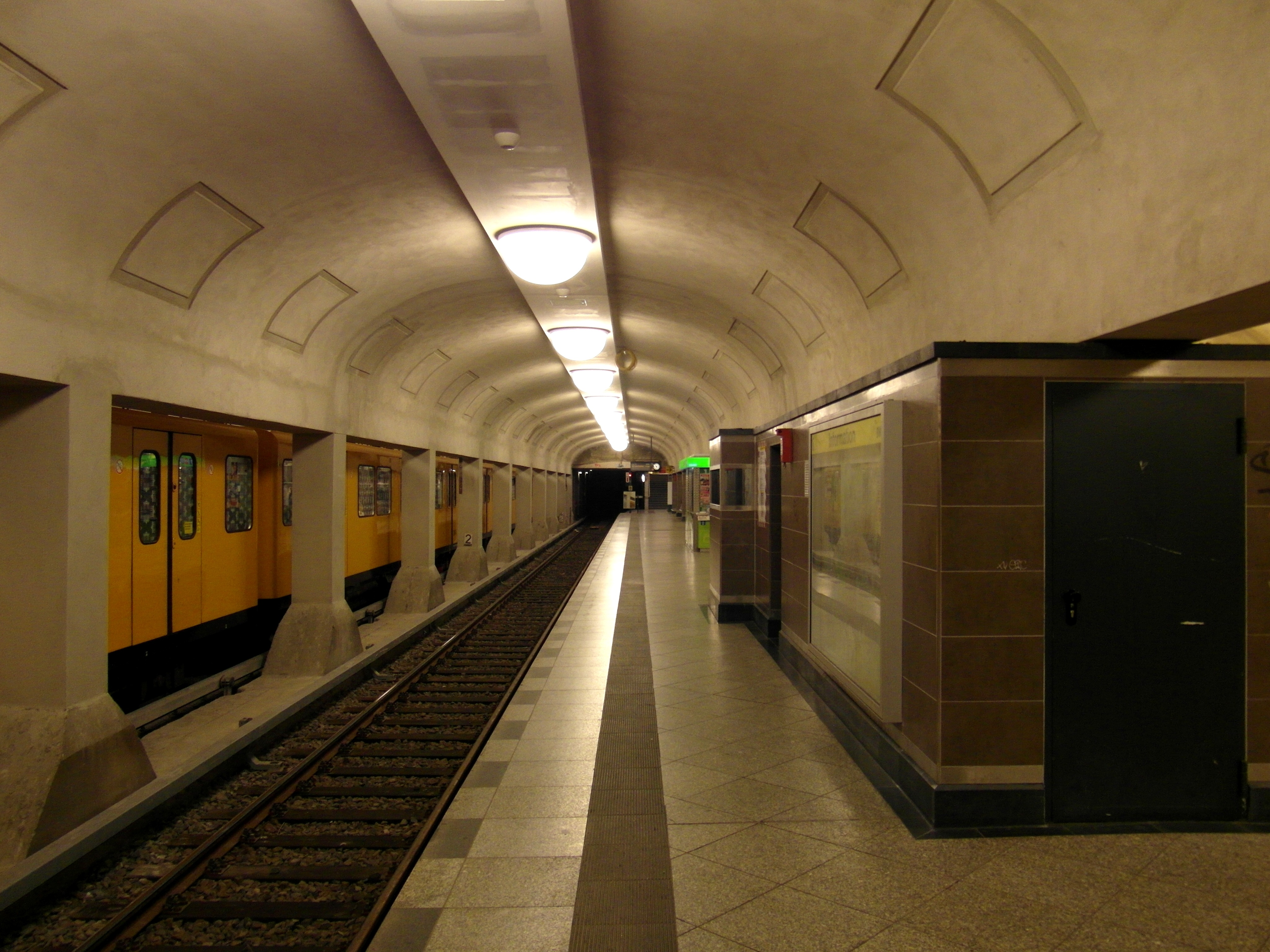
- Platform view of Mehringdamm

General information
- Location: Kreuzberg
- System: Cross-platform interchange
- Owner: Berliner Verkehrsbetriebe
- Operator: Berliner Verkehrsbetriebe
- Line: U6 U7
- Platforms: 2 island platforms
- Tracks: 4
- Train operators: Berliner Verkehrsbetriebe

Construction
- Structure type: Underground

Other information
- Fare zone: VBB: Berlin A/5555

History
- Opened: 19 April 1924; 102 years ago

Services
| Preceding station | Berlin U-Bahn | Following station |
|---|---|---|
| Hallesches Tor towards Alt-Tegel | U6 | Platz der Luftbrücke towards Alt-Mariendorf |
| Möckernbrücke towards Rathaus Spandau | U7 | Gneisenaustraße towards Rudow |
Location

Mehringdamm is a Berlin U-Bahn station located on the U6 and the U7.

== History ==
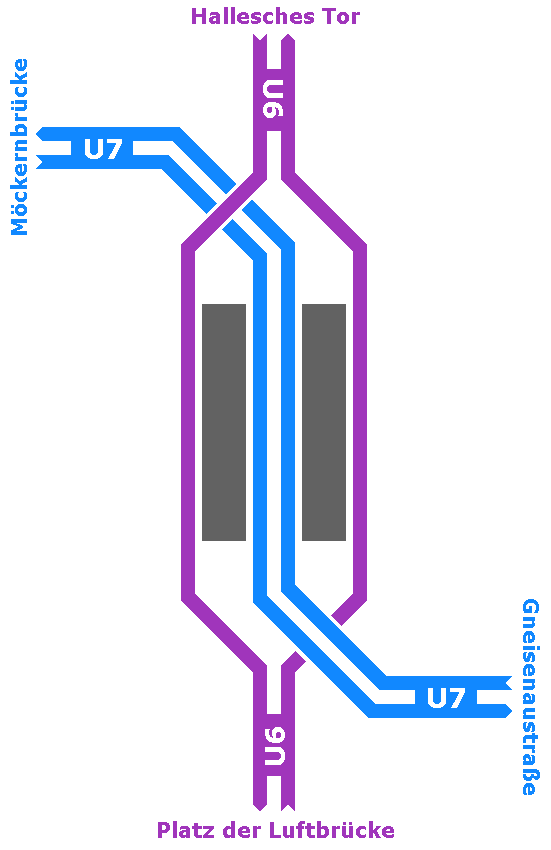
Structure of cross-platform interchange between subway lines U6 and U7 at Mehringdamm.

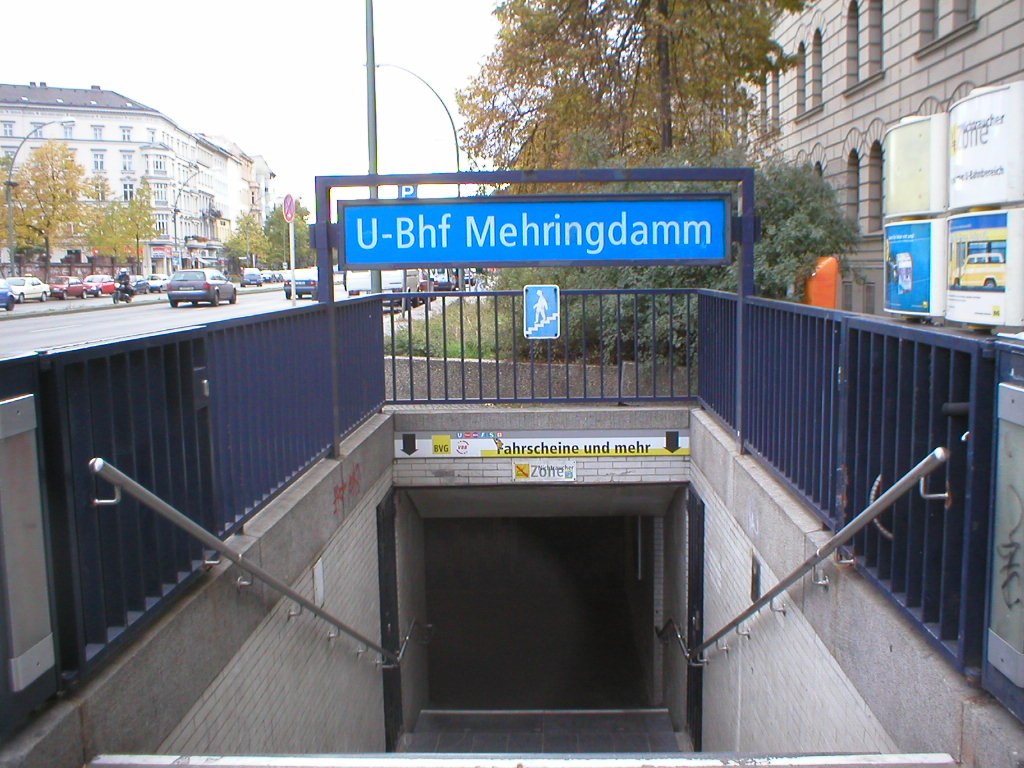
The entrance of U-Bahn station Mehringdamm

Opened in 1924 as Belle-Alliance Straße it was built by Grenander and later renovated by Rümmler. The station's ceiling collapsed during the Battle of Berlin.

In 1946 the station was renamed Franz-Mehring-Straße, after the socialist politician.

In 1947, the station received its current name Mehringdamm. Following renovations in 1965, passengers could transfer from the U6 to the U7 on the same platform.
