= Gneisenaustraße station =

Station of the Berlin U-Bahn

Coordinates: 52°29′29″N 13°23′46″E

Gneisenaustraße
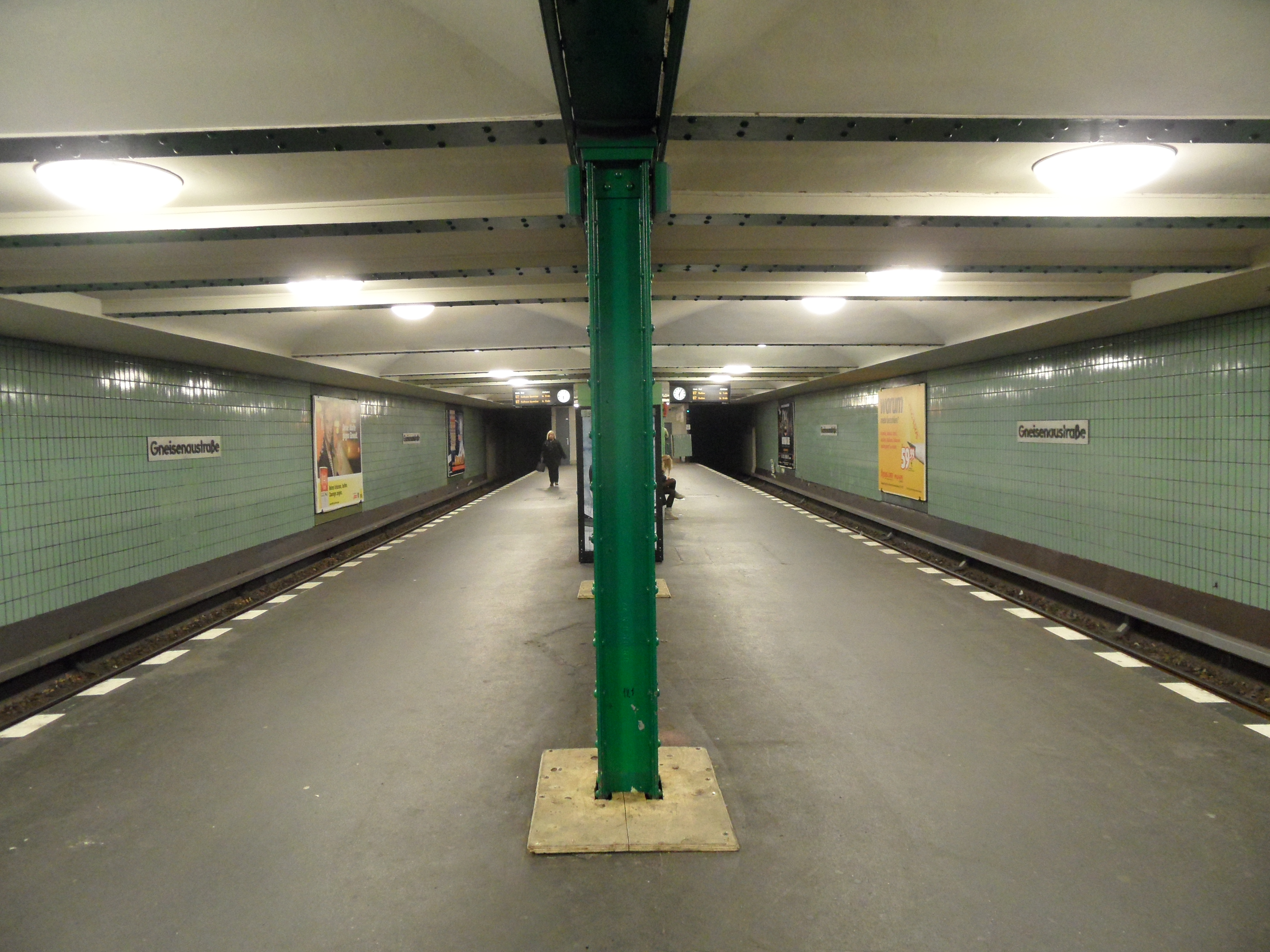
- 2010

General information
- Location: Gneisenaustraße/Mittenwalder Straße/Zossener Straße; 10961 Berlin; Kreuzberg; Germany
- Owner: BVG
- Operator: BVG
- Platforms: 1 island platform
- Tracks: 2
- Train operators: BVG
- Connections: 140 248; N7

Construction
- Structure type: Underground
- Cycle facilities: yes
- Accessible: lift in construction

Other information
- Station code: Gs
- Fare zone: : Berlin B/5656

History
- Opened: 19 January 1924; 102 years ago

Services
Preceding station	Berlin U-Bahn	Following station
Mehringdamm towards Rathaus Spandau	U7	Südstern towards Rudow
Location

Gneisenaustraße is a station on the U7 in Berlin, Germany.

== History ==
Built by Alfred Grenander, the station opened on 19 January 1924 as the terminus of the extension of the north-south U-Bahn (today's lines U6 and U7) from Hallesches Tor, before the eventual extension to Neukölln. The station is named after August von Gneisenau, a 19th-century Prussian Generalfeldmarschall.

Until February 28, 1966, the line formerly designated as C^{I} operated from Gneisenaustrasse to Britz-Süd via Neukölln in one direction and to Tegel via Friedrichstrasse in the other. With the commissioning of the route from Mehringdamm to Möckernbrücke the next day, this changed the U6 and U7 so that the line now called Line 7 ran between Möckernbrücke and Britz-Süd. The extension from Britz-Süd to Rudow opened in 1972, and Möckernbrücke to Rathaus Spandau in 1984.

In 1968 the 80-meter platforms were extended to 110 meters to allow the use of longer six-car trains. At the same time, the plaster walls were abandoned in favor of a green tile paneling. Due to these changes the station lost much of its original appearance.
