= Karl-Marx-Straße station =

Station of the Berlin U-Bahn

Coordinates: 52°28′35″N 13°26′21″E

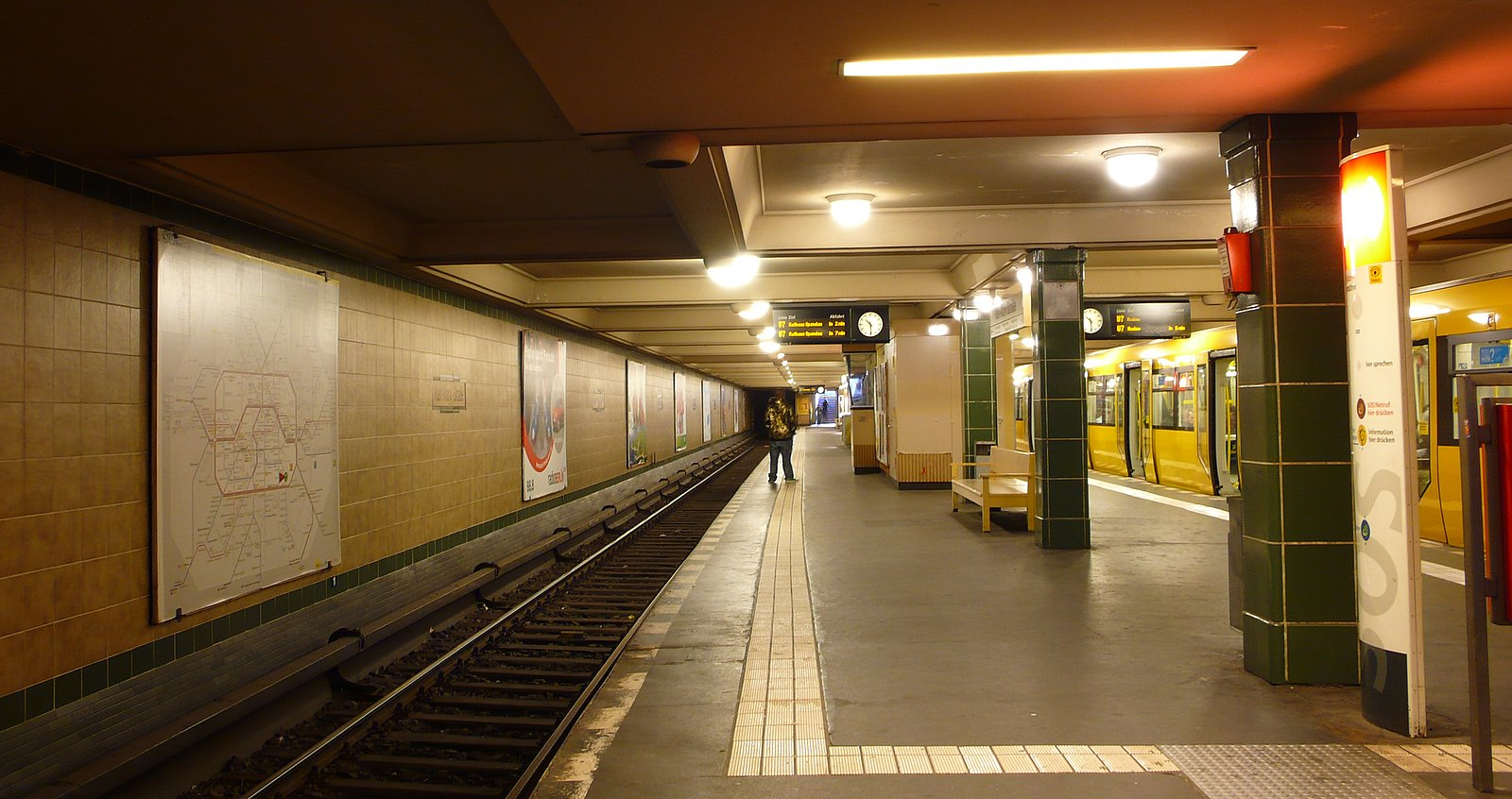
Platform view

Karl-Marx-Straße is a Berlin U-Bahn station located on the U7 rail line. The station opened in 1926 under the name "Bergstraße," and was renamed to the current one in 1946. Although Karl Marx was a hero of the socialist republic of East Germany, the station is in former West Berlin. In 1968, the station was lengthened to 105m; due to this much of its original appearance was lost. In 1993, parts of the platform fell into the rail track and the station closed for a few days while repairs were made. The station is one stop from Neukölln station, where passengers can transfer to the S-Bahn.

Preceding station	Berlin U-Bahn	Following station
Rathaus Neukölln towards Rathaus Spandau	U7	Neukölln towards Rudow
