= U7 (Berlin U-Bahn) =

Rail line on the Berlin U-Bahn

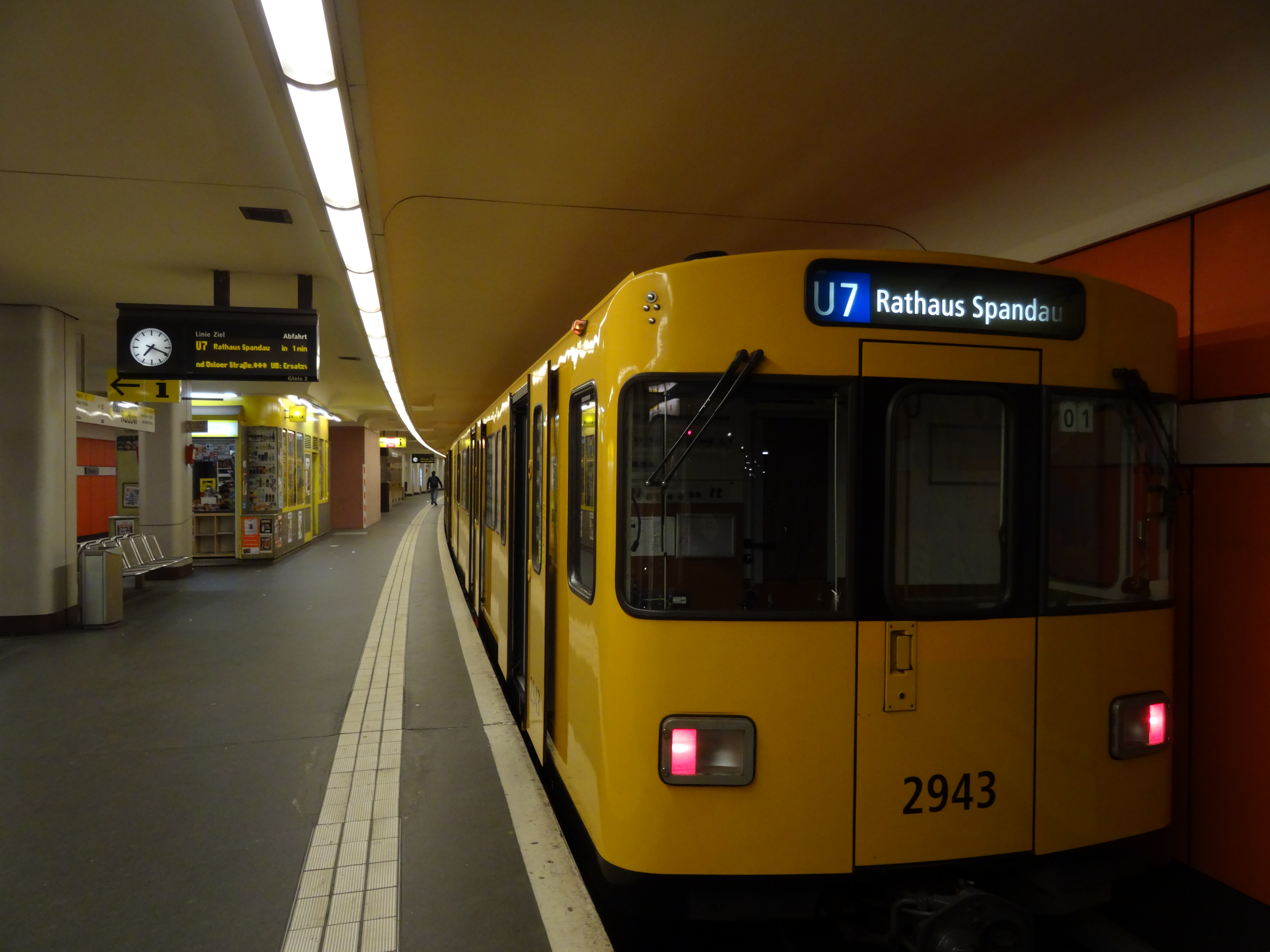
- A train at Rudow, the eastern terminus of the U7

Overview
- Locale: Berlin
- Termini: Rathaus Spandau; Rudow
- Stations: 40

Service
- Type: Rapid transit
- System: Berlin U-Bahn
- Operator: Berliner Verkehrsbetriebe
- Depot: Britz
- Rolling stock: F84/87/90/92; H

History
- Opened: 19 April 1924; 102 years ago (Note: From Belle-Alliance Straße (now Mehringdamm) to Gneisenaustraße, as a branch of Line C (now the U6))
- Separated from Line C: 28 February 1966
- Last extension: 1 October 1984 (Note: From Rohrdamm to Rathaus Spandau)

Technical
- Line length: 31.8 km (19.8 mi)
- Track gauge: 1,435 mm (4 ft 8 1/2 in) standard gauge
- Loading gauge: Großprofil
- Electrification: 750 V DC third rail (bottom running)
Route map
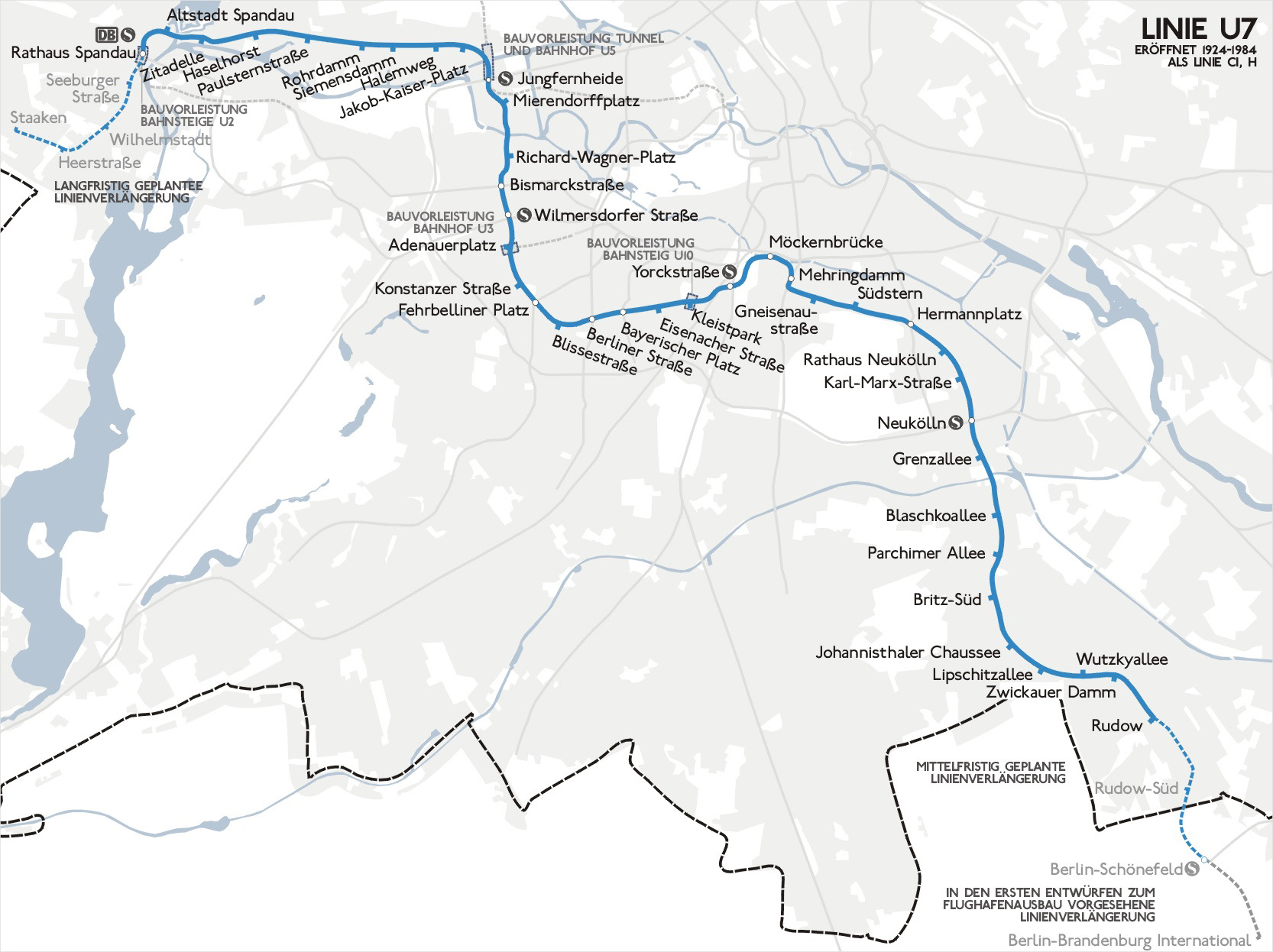

The U7 is a rail line on the Berlin U-Bahn. It runs completely underground for a length of 31.8 kilometres (19.8 mi) through 40 stations and connects Spandau, via Neukölln, to Gropiusstadt and Rudow. The U7 was originally the south-eastern branch of the Nord-Süd-Bahn (U6) that ran between the branching point at Belle-Alliance-Straße (Mehringdamm) and Grenzallee; however, in the 1960s, this stretch was separated from the rest of the line and extended at each end to form a new line.

The U7 is Berlin's longest underground line, both in terms of absolute length and total travel time, and one of the longest all-subterranean lines in Europe.

== Route ==
Starting in Rudow, at the junction of Gross-Ziethener Chaussee and Neuköllner Straße, the U7 runs northwest below the road Alt-Rudow, before bearing west in the Gropiusstadt area. Because the settlement and underground construction there were planned simultaneously, the U7 follows no roads until it reaches Britz-Süd station, where it runs under Fritz-Reuter-Allee as far as Blaschkoallee station before joining the route of Buschkrugallee. It continues north, crossing the urban motorway and the Ringbahn while under Karl-Marx-Straße, then heads north-west under Hasenheide, Südstern, and Gneisenaustraße until it reaches Mehringdamm after a very sharp right curve. A tight left curve brings the U7 under the Tempelhofer Ufer (English: Tempelhof waterside) to Möckernbrücke station, with another taking it back and below the area of the former Anhalter Güterbahnhof (English: Anhalter goods station). The route continues west under Yorckstraße, Willmanndamm, Grunewaldstraße, Bayerischer Platz, and Berliner Straße, then heads north under Brandenburgische Straße to Adenauerplatz station.

A curve into Wilmersdorfer Straße takes the U7 north to Bismarckstraße station, where it makes a further turn into Richard-Wagner-Straße, travelling under this road and its northern continuations Wintersteinstraße and Sömmeringstraße. At Jungfernheide station, the U7 crosses the Ringbahn for the second time before passing under the Westhafenkanal. The track then turns west through a wide arc and follows Siemensdamm and Nonnendammallee. It passes to the south of the Spandau Citadel below the road Am Juliusturm, runs under the Old Town of Spandau, and ends at Rathaus Spandau station.

The U7 passes through 12 districts of Berlin: Rudow, Gropiusstadt, Britz, Neukölln, Kreuzberg, Schöneberg, Wilmersdorf, Charlottenburg, Charlottenburg-Nord, Siemensstadt, Haselhorst, and Spandau.

== History ==
=== Construction of the North-South Underground: 1901–1930 ===
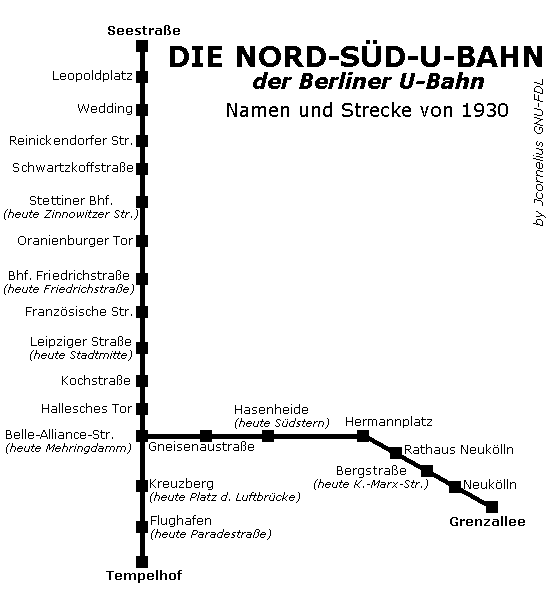
Map of the former Nord-Süd Bahn in 1930

Around 1901, the city of Berlin planned to build an underground railway line below Friedrichstraße to connect the north to the south. Werner von Siemens also had plans for a north–south line, under Nobelstraße, at the same time, but permission for these was declined on the grounds that public transport should be in municipal ownership. Consequently, Berlin started the construction of the Nord–Süd-Bahn (North–South railway) to link Wedding and Tempelhof (as of 2007, part of the U6), with a branch to Neukölln.

World War I made the construction work difficult, and finally stopped it completely. In 1919, work started again, but not without further complications. In 1921, during the time of hyperinflation, filling up the existing tunnels was considered as financial turmoil hit hard. The construction work was continued, however, and the first tunnel section from Hallesches Tor to Stettiner Bahnhof (later renamed Naturkundemuseum) was opened on 30 January 1923.

The history of the U7 began with the construction of the branch to Neukölln, when the stretch from Hallesches Tor to Gneisenaustraße was built; it opened on 9 April 1924. With inflation still taking its toll, the construction work proceeded in small steps only. The extension to Hasenheide station, named after a nearby park (and later renamed Südstern), followed on 14 December of the same year. As the financial situation of Germany and Berlin improved, so too did the underground railway construction, including the branch to Neukölln.

At Hermannplatz station, which resembles something of an U-Bahn cathedral, the first underground rail–rail crossing in Berlin was developed; transfer to the GN-Bahn (later the U8) was intended at this station. The station is also the first Berlin underground station to use escalators. The section from Hasenheide to Bergstraße (later Karl-Marx-Straße) was put into operation on 11 April 1926. The final stage of the Neukölln branch at that time, the 1.5 kilometre-long (0.9 mi) extension to Grenzallee, was put into operation on 21 December 1930—the same day of the opening of what would become the U5 line—during one of the largest underground opening celebrations. Underground passengers could then travel from Seestraße (U6), through the city centre, to either Tempelhof or Grenzallee.

The post-war underground lines were marked out from their 1901–1914 predecessors by their larger tunnels and trains, in order to provide greater competition with the privately run Berliner Hochbahngesellschaft (English: Berlin Elevated Railway Company). The new trains and tunnels, which were wider but used the same standard-gauge track, were described as Großprofil (English: large profile).

=== Connection to Rudow ===
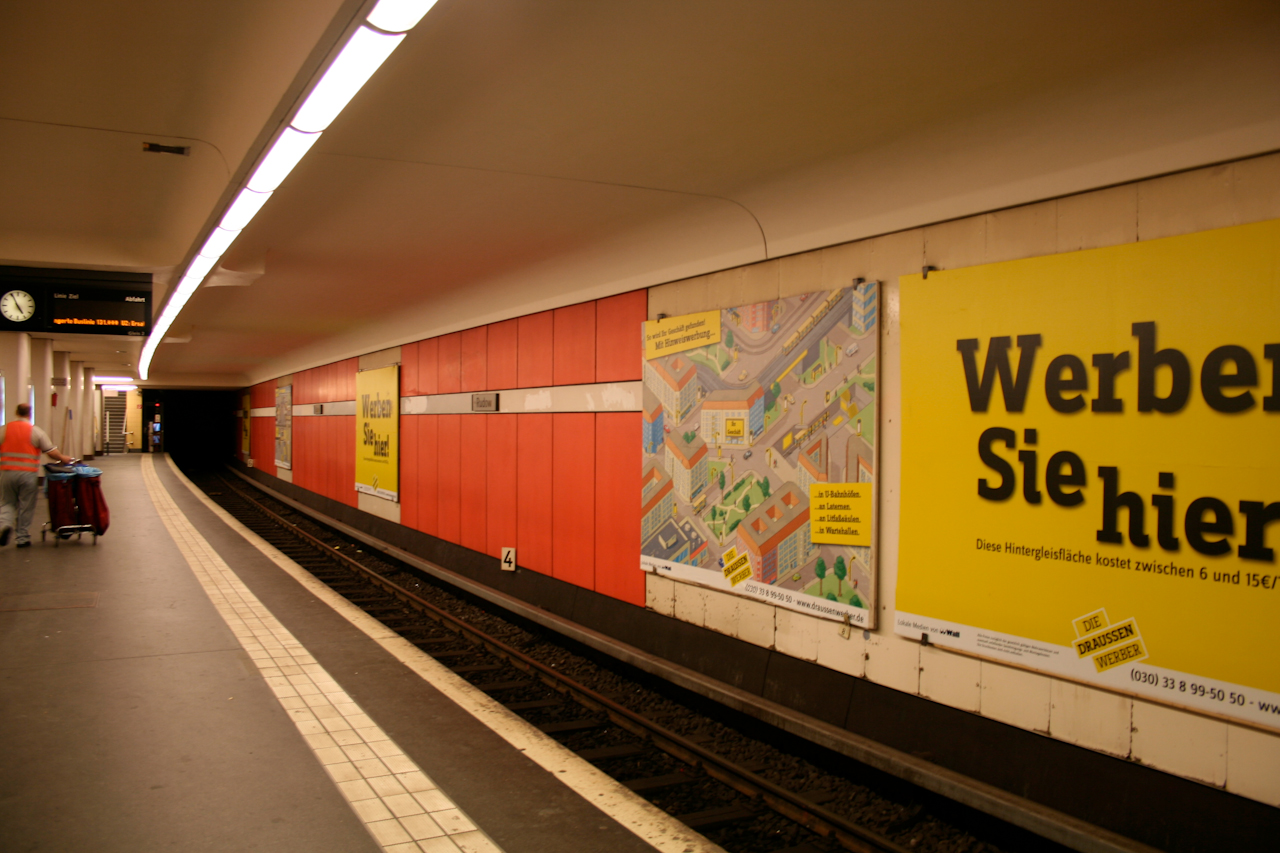
Rudow terminus station platform.

Following World War II—in which many of Berlin's residences were destroyed—large new housing developments were needed. Britz and Britz-Buckow-Rudow (BBR; later renamed Gropiusstadt), which were established in the south of West Berlin, required a new rapid-transit railway connection to the West Berlin city centre; the construction work for the underground railway began on 2 November 1959.

The track from Grenzallee to Britz-Süd opened on 28 September 1963.

Construction began from Britz-Süd to Rudow on 2 January 1965. Travel to Zwickauer Damm was made possible on 2 January 1970, and Rudow received connection to Line 7 on 1 July 1972.

=== Extension to the west ===
The branch station Belle-Alliance-Straße (later renamed Mehringdamm), which opened in 1924, had three tracks: a connection to Tempelhof led from the first platform; to Neukölln from the second; and to the city centre from the third. A separation of the Neuköllner branch from the North-South Line was decided upon in order to avoid an overload on the transfer station Hallesches Tor. Therefore, Line 7 was extended west from Belle-Alliance-Straße. The construction work began in the middle of 1962, and was completed on 26 February 1966 with the link to Möckernbrücke station. Beside the construction of Möckernbrücke station, changes to Mehringdamm station—which would become a transfer point between unbranched lines—were necessary.

The further extension of Line 7 was accomplished with subsidy funds. The construction of the track from Möckernbrücke to Fehrbelliner Platz started on 1 July 1962, and finished on 29 January 1971.

=== In three stages to Spandau: 1960-1984 ===
Altstadt Spandau: Last station before the terminus Rathaus Spandau

At the end of the 1960s, ideas about an underground railway line to Spandau arose again. The planned extension to Line 7 through Mierendorffplatz, Jungfernheide, and Nonnendammallee was chosen to improve public transportation to Siemensstadt—important for its many jobs. Already at the time, there were plans to build a subway to Spandau. First steps were taken with the extension of the line of today's line U2 to Ruhleben. The terminus Ruhleben is located directly on the district border to Spandau. Feeder and distribution traffic, until 1967 by tram, replaced by several bus lines, provided solely for the development of Spandau on the subway station Ruhleben.

The construction work for the section Fehrbelliner Platz–Richard-Wagner-Platz began in 1969 which is H-West-II. By 1970, the then shortest and less frequented subway line of Berlin, line 5, oscillated between Deutsche Oper and Richard Wagner Platz. Their old route was shut down for passenger traffic, and a new station was built several meters below the old one. The remaining tunnels could be converted into an operating section, making it the second exchange line between small and large profile after the Waisentunnel at Alexanderplatz station. The route continues under the Brandenburgische Straße and crosses the Kurfürstendamm at Adenauerplatz, where a train station was also built. The station was created as a crossing station as it was (and officially still is) planned to extend the current U-Bahn line U1 from Uhlandstraße to Adenauerplatz. After Adenauerplatz, the track swings under Wilmersdorfer Straße and passes under the Stadtbahn.

Wilmersdorfer Straße was constructed with a pedestrian passage to the Charlottenburg S-Bahn station. At Bismarckstraße, a new underground railway station had to be built, since the pre-existing tunnel of Line 1 (later renamed U2) was in a bad condition and necessitated extensive repair works. After Bismarckstraße, 23 houses had to be underpinned, therefore the shield drive was used for tunnelling this section. The stage from Fehrbelliner Platz to Richard-Wagner-Platz was put into operation on 28 April 1978.

Earthworks and some motorway construction began at Charlottenburg-Nord on 3 July 1967, which is located at Siemensstadt. Construction began for the section to Rohrdamm from 1973. The construction work for the next section towards Spandau began in 1973. The route leads north of the station Richard-Wagner-Platz further under the Sömmeringstraße. Halfway to Mierendorffplatz, the Spree is underpassed using the caisson construction method. After a few meters, the station follows Mierendorffplatz. North of the station, the route makes a wide berth to reach the existing S-Bahn station Jungfernheide. Here, similar to the station Schloßstraße, the platforms were built on two levels. The other tracks are kept until today for a possible extension of the U5, which is to lead from Lehrter to Tegel Airport via Turmstraße and Jungfernheide. However, the plan was cancelled due to the budget situation, the longer length of the extension north of Jungfernheide station due to the planned closure of Tegel Airport. Trams will be replacing the U-Bahn extension. The finished extension is now used for firefighting exercises and is no longer usable for any future line. The extension to Rohrdamm followed on 1 October 1980, providing the district of Spandau with its first underground connection.

The costs of the extension to the Spandau city centre rose to unexpected heights: it consumed 680 million German marks as a result of the need to undercut the Havel river and the swampy ground in the surrounding area. Construction began on 4 July 1977. Several variants were investigated. One plan was to lead the subway through the Haselhorster village center, with a downside that the Havel had to be undercut at one of its widest points. Another variant was that the subway would cross the existing Spandau suburban railway of the S-Bahn and the subway would be led from the south to Spandau city hall. This plan crystallized very late, as the 200-kilometre (120 mi) plan envisaged to lead the U7 over Falkenseer Platz into Falkenhagener Feld. This resulted in the disadvantage that the Spandau old town could not be connected, which was the main goal of the extension. Finally, they decided to continue the route along the Nonnendammallee or the street Am Juliusturm, south past the Spandau Citadel and then directly to the old town and on to the Spandau town hall, with the development of Falkenhagener Feld taken over by the extension of the small profile route of the line U2 of Ruhleben. On 1 October 1984, the last section of the U7 from Rohrdamm to Rathaus Spandau was opened, with the then Federal Chancellor of Germany, Helmut Kohl, in attendance.

== Future plans ==
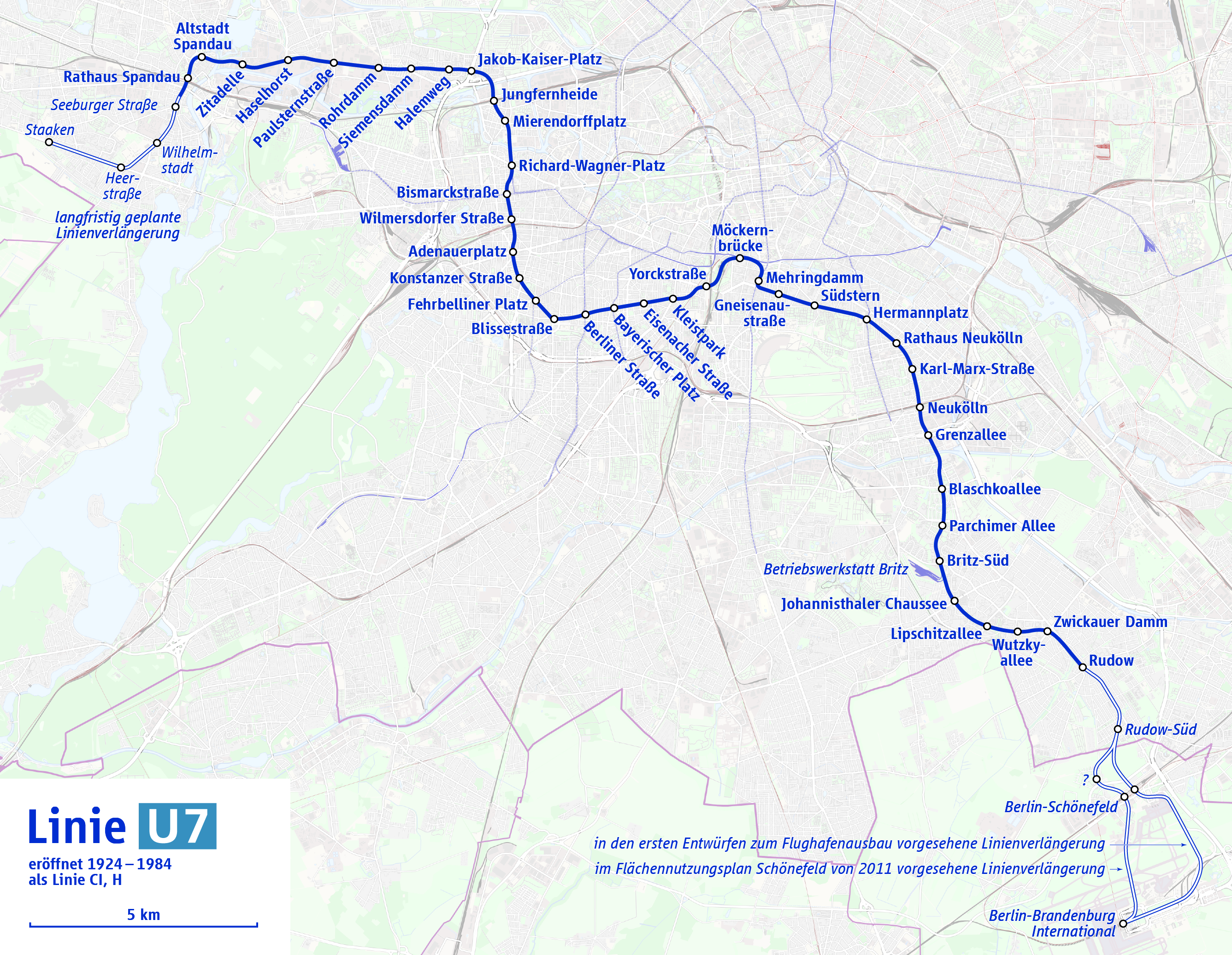
Map showing two options for the planned extension of the U7 line to Berlin Brandenburg Airport

In 2014, the Berlin city government published the Berlin U-Bahn 2014 Plan, according to which the long-postponed northern extension of the U7 to Staaken is expected to begin construction in 2021 and be completed in 2025. A southern extension from Rudow to Berlin Brandenburg Airport via Neuhofer Straße, Lieselotte-Berger-Straße, and Schönefeld was temporarily shelved as the expected patronage was not high enough to justify such an expansion. However, in light of the ballot measure aimed at keeping Tegel Airport open after the opening of the new Brandenburg Airport, governing mayor Michael Müller suggested an extension of U7 towards Schönefeld and/or the new airport which was greeted with enthusiasm by local politicians in Schönefeld and the Berlin district of Neukölln.

== Line colour and name ==
In 1966, the branched C line had a violet map colour. After it was separated from the rest of the line and line names were changed from letters to numbers, this route was called Linie 7 (English: Line 7), and was represented by a grey line. After 1978, however, it was changed to a bright blue, because it is more easily discerned on the map. Since 1984, when all the underground lines received a "U" prefix, it has been called "U7". Station signages use the Helvetica font which is widely used in subway systems globally.

== In popular culture ==
In March 2009, TML-Studios released 'World of Subways Vol. 2: U7 - Berlin' for Windows, which gives players the opportunity to operate a train on the U7 Line in either F90 or H01 rolling stock.
