= Rudow station =

Station of the Berlin U-Bahn

Coordinates: 52°24′58″N 13°29′43″E

Rudow
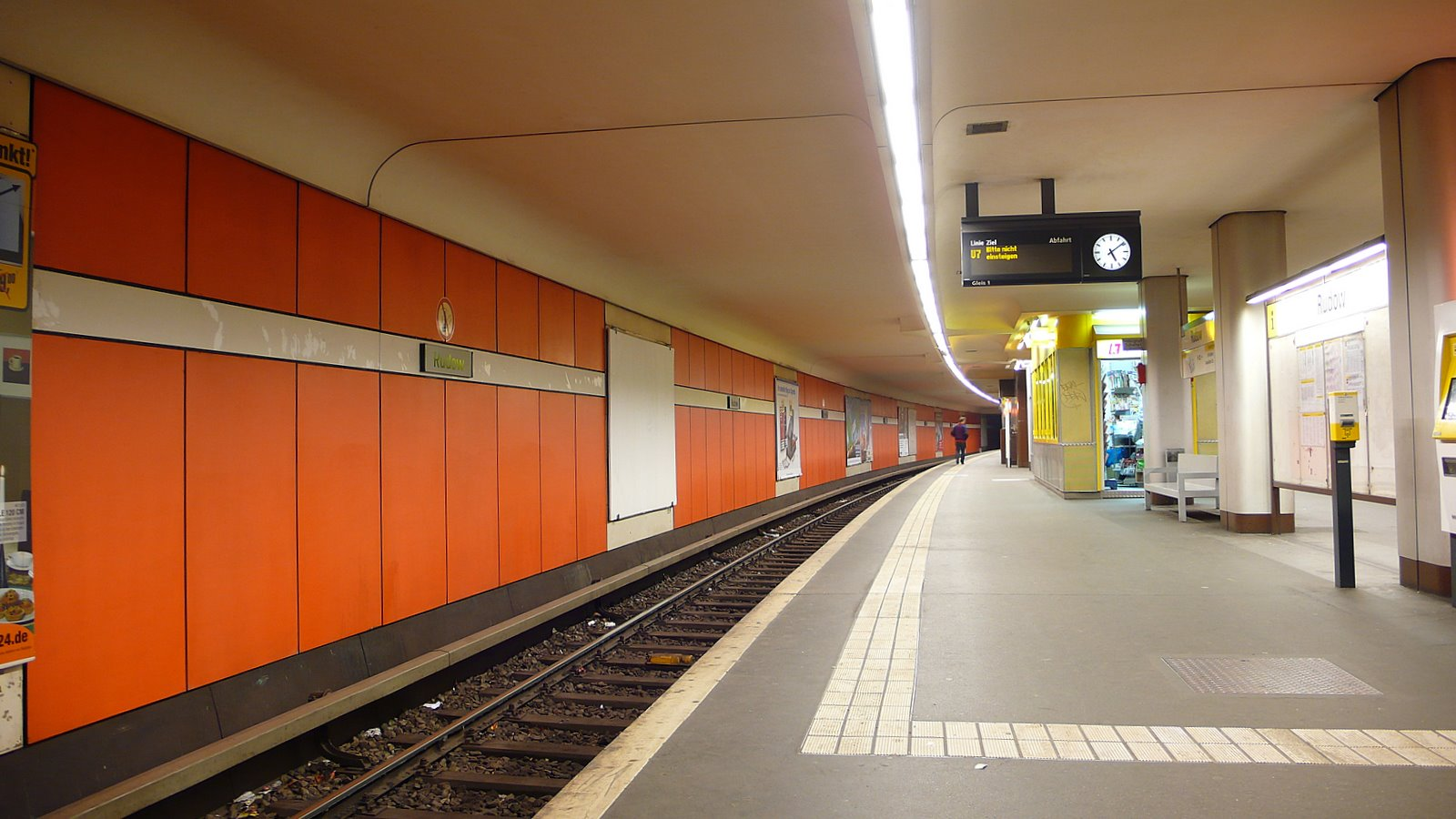

General information
- Owner: Berliner Verkehrsbetriebe
- Operator: Berliner Verkehrsbetriebe
- Platforms: 1 island platform
- Tracks: 2
- Train operators: Berliner Verkehrsbetriebe
- Connections: U7

Construction
- Structure type: Underground

Other information
- Fare zone: VBB: Berlin B/5656

History
- Opened: 1 July 1972; 54 years ago

Services
Preceding station	Berlin U-Bahn	Following station
Zwickauer Damm towards Rathaus Spandau	U7	Terminus
Location

Rudow is a Berlin U-Bahn station located on the U7 line. There is a bus link to Berlin Schönefeld Airport, served by Line 171 and the express bus X7. Since 2015, the station has been under extended refurbishment to provide a better interchange between buses serving Brandenburg Airport/BER and the trains.

Opened in 1972 by architect Rümmler, it is the end station of the U7 line. Storage sidings for subway trains at the southern end measure about 350 m. The next is Zwickauer Damm (returning to Rathaus Spandau).
