= Südstern station =

Station of the Berlin U-Bahn

Coordinates: 52°29′22″N 13°24′28″E

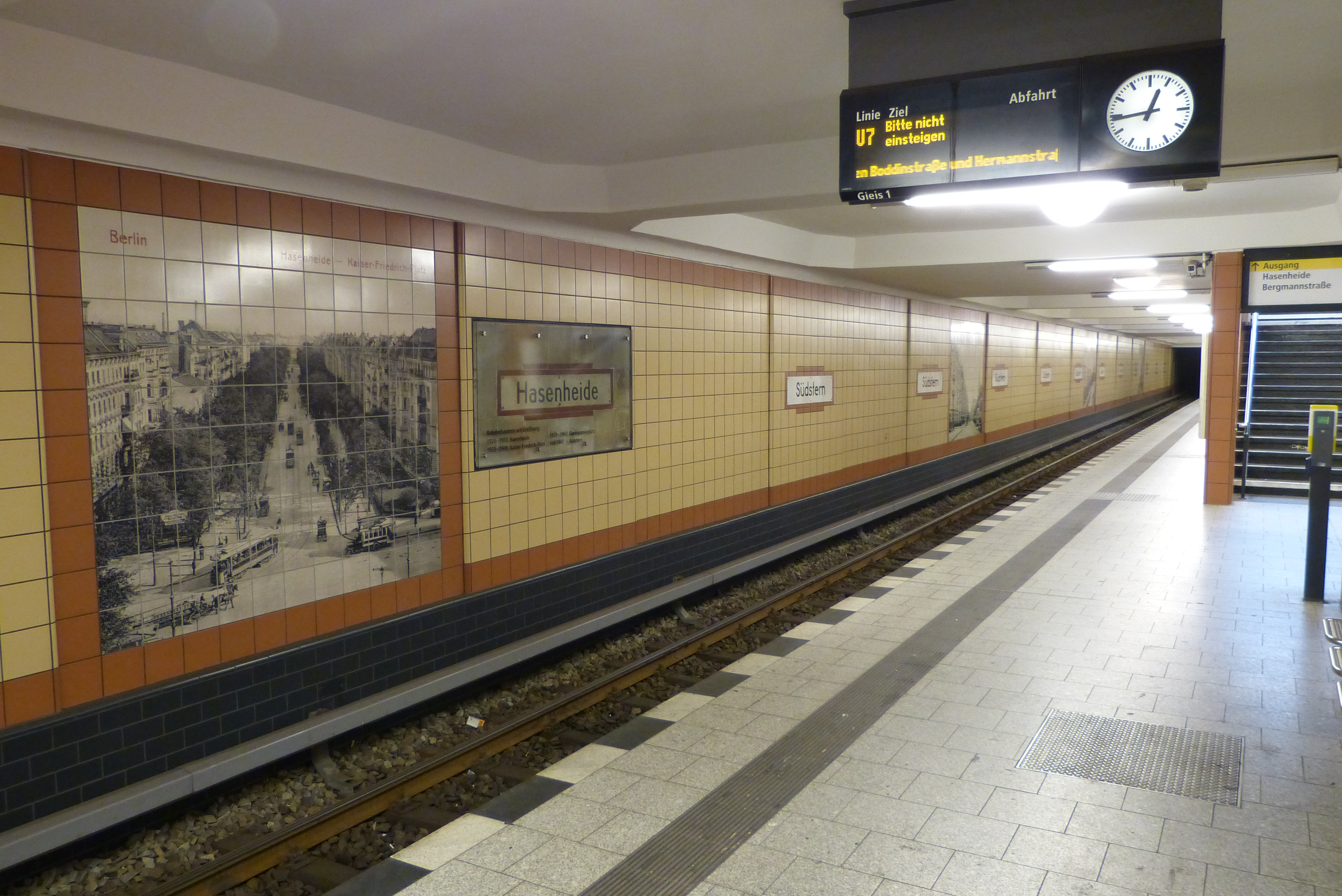
U-Bahn station Südstern (Below ground)

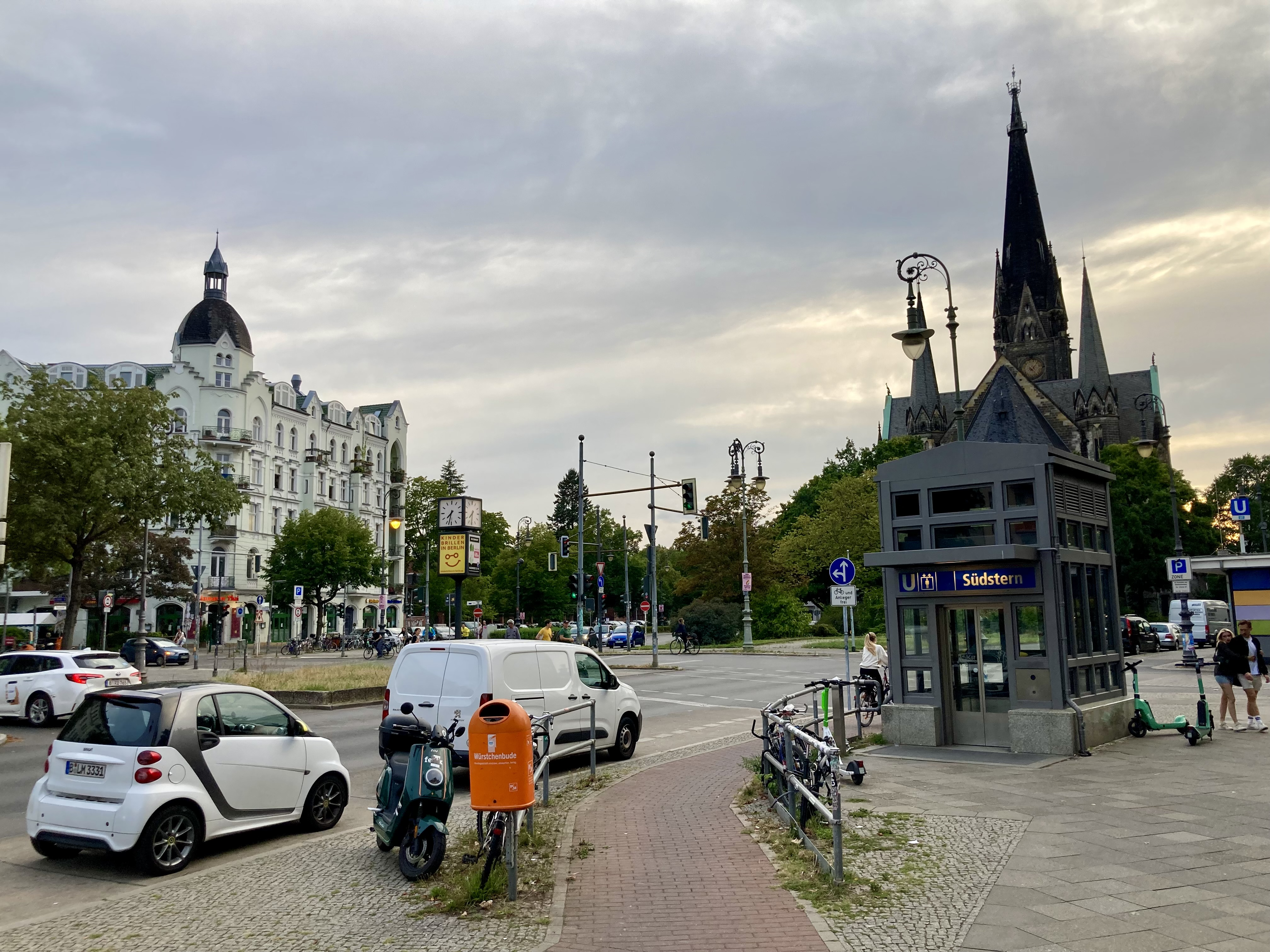
U-Bahn station Südstern (Above ground)

Südstern is a circus of Kreuzberg district, Berlin, as well as a Berlin U-Bahn station of same denominator located on the U7.

== History ==
Built by Alfred Grenander in 1924, the station was originally named "Hasenheide." In 1933 the name changed to "Kaiser-Friedrich-Platz," and to "Gardepionierplatz" in 1939.

On 24 May 1944, during the Battle of Berlin, two allied bombs hit the station and the ceiling collapsed.

In 1947 the station was renamed again, this time to its present “Südstern.” In 1958, the platform was elongated.

In 2010 the station was planned to gain accessibility support for the blind and partially-sighted, and an elevator.

Preceding station	Berlin U-Bahn	Following station
Gneisenaustraße towards Rathaus Spandau	U7	Hermannplatz towards Rudow
