= Rathaus Neukölln station =

Station of the Berlin U-Bahn

Coordinates: 52°28′54″N 13°26′03″E

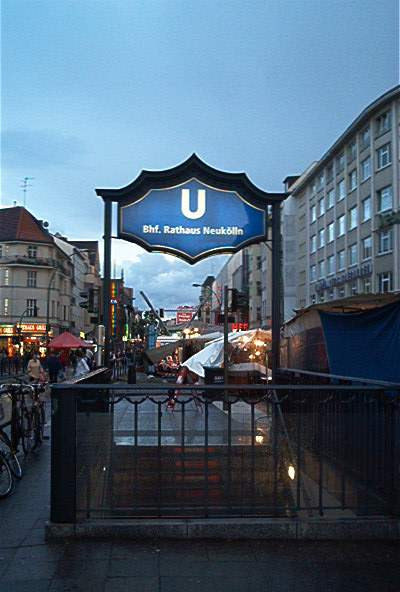
The entrance of U-Bahn station Rathaus Neukölln

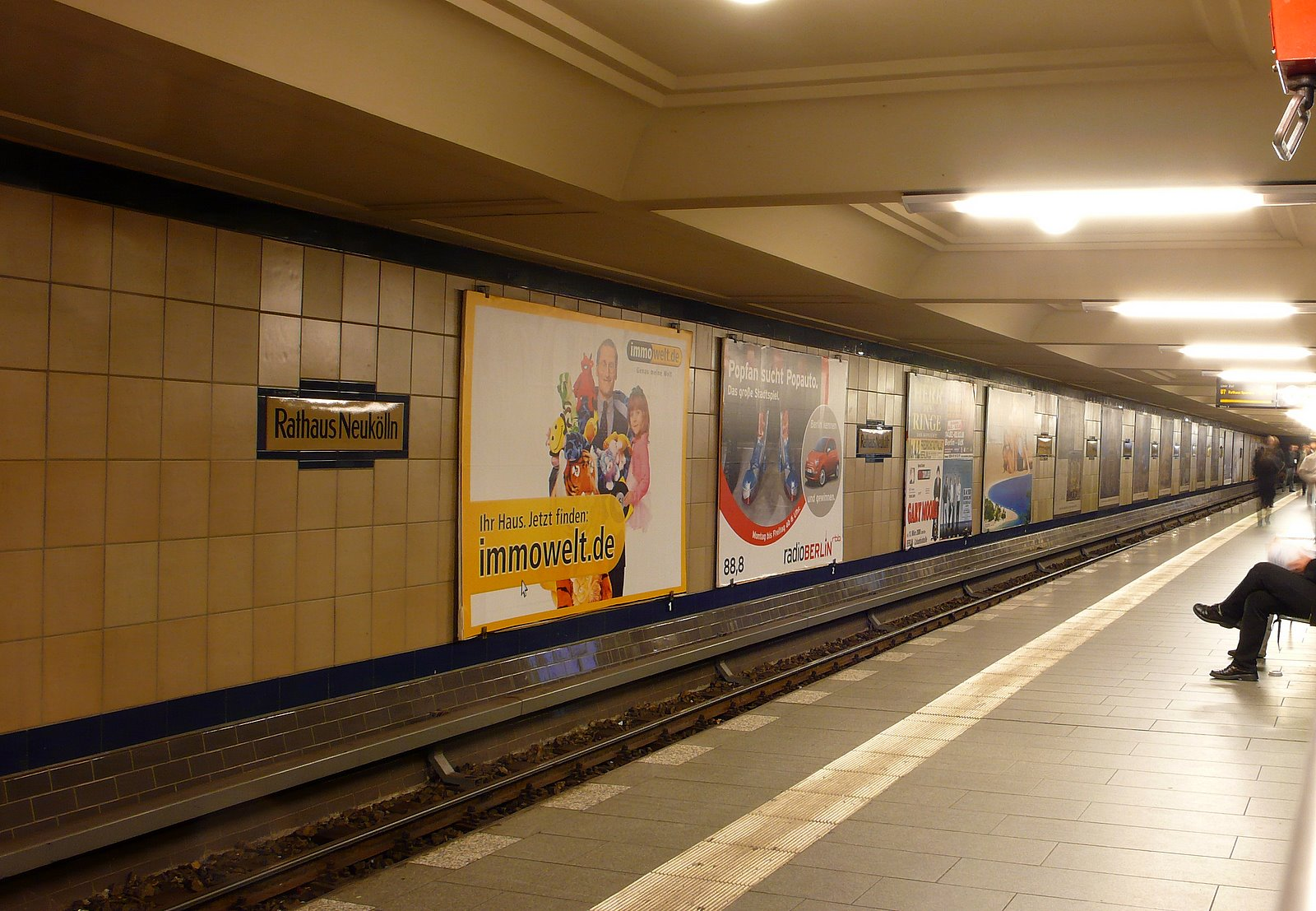
Platform view

Rathaus Neukölln (Neukölln Town Hall) is a Berlin U-Bahn station located on the U7 line.

== History ==
The station was built in 1926 by Alfred Grenander, and the platform extended in 1968. In 1989 a lift was installed, and the station became the first in Neukölln to be accessible to people with disabilities.

Preceding station	Berlin U-Bahn	Following station
Hermannplatz towards Rathaus Spandau	U7	Karl-Marx-Straße towards Rudow
