= Hermannplatz station =

Station of the Berlin U-Bahn

Coordinates: 52°29′14″N 13°25′29″E

Hermannplatz
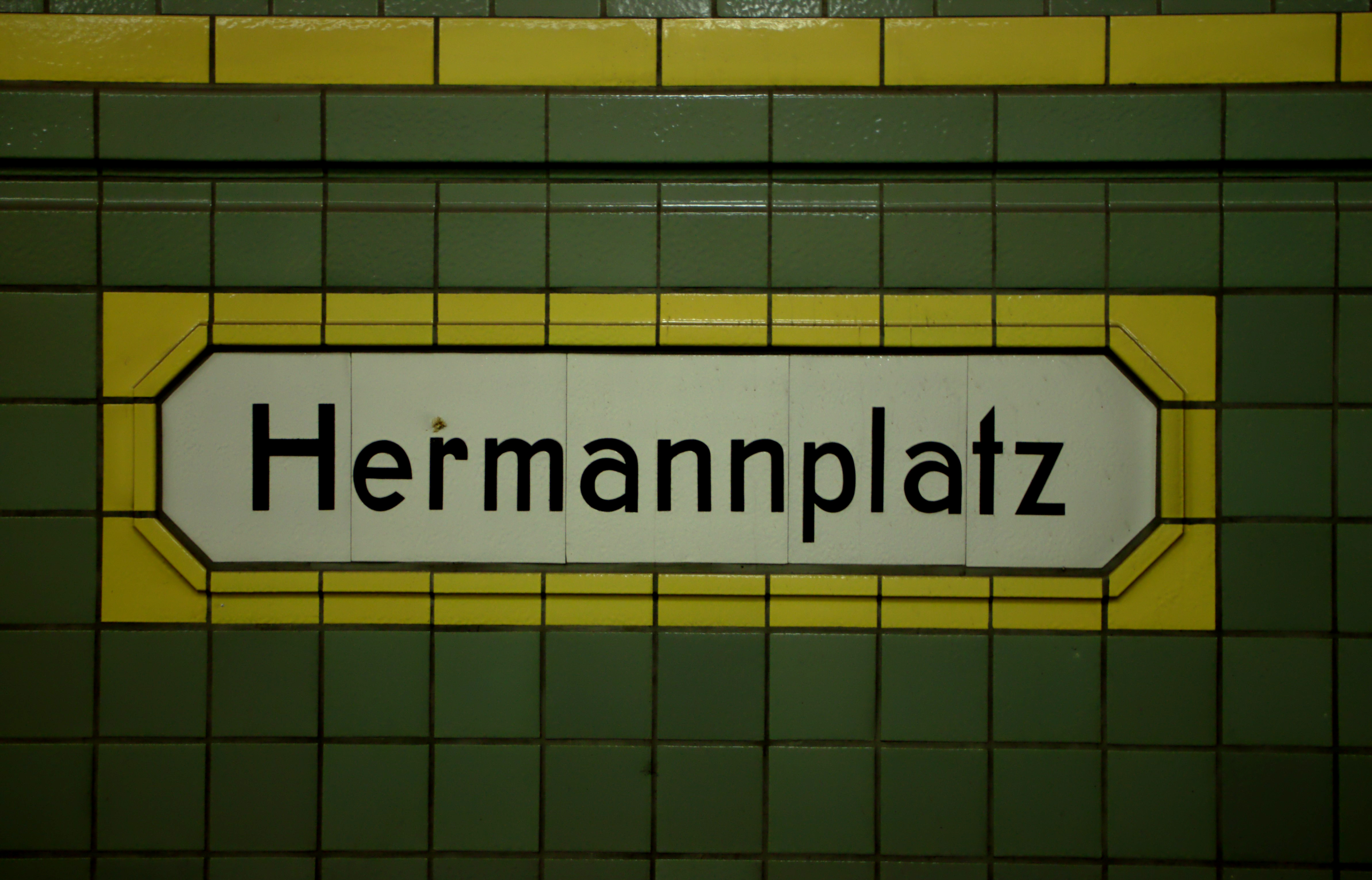

General information
- Location: Neukölln
- System: Interchange station
- Owner: Berliner Verkehrsbetriebe
- Operator: Berliner Verkehrsbetriebe
- Platforms: 2 island platforms
- Tracks: 4
- Train operators: Berliner Verkehrsbetriebe
- Connections: U7 U8

Construction
- Structure type: Underground

Other information
- Fare zone: VBB: Berlin A/5555

History
- Opened: 11 April 1926; 100 years ago (U7); 17 July 1927; 99 years ago (U8)

Services
Preceding station	Berlin U-Bahn	Following station
Südstern towards Rathaus Spandau	U7	Rathaus Neukölln towards Rudow
Schönleinstraße towards Wittenau	U8	Boddinstraße towards Hermannstraße
Location

Hermannplatz is a station in the Neukölln district of Berlin which serves as an interchange between the lines U7 and U8. Operated by the BVG, it is one of the busiest stations on the Berlin U-Bahn system.

== History ==
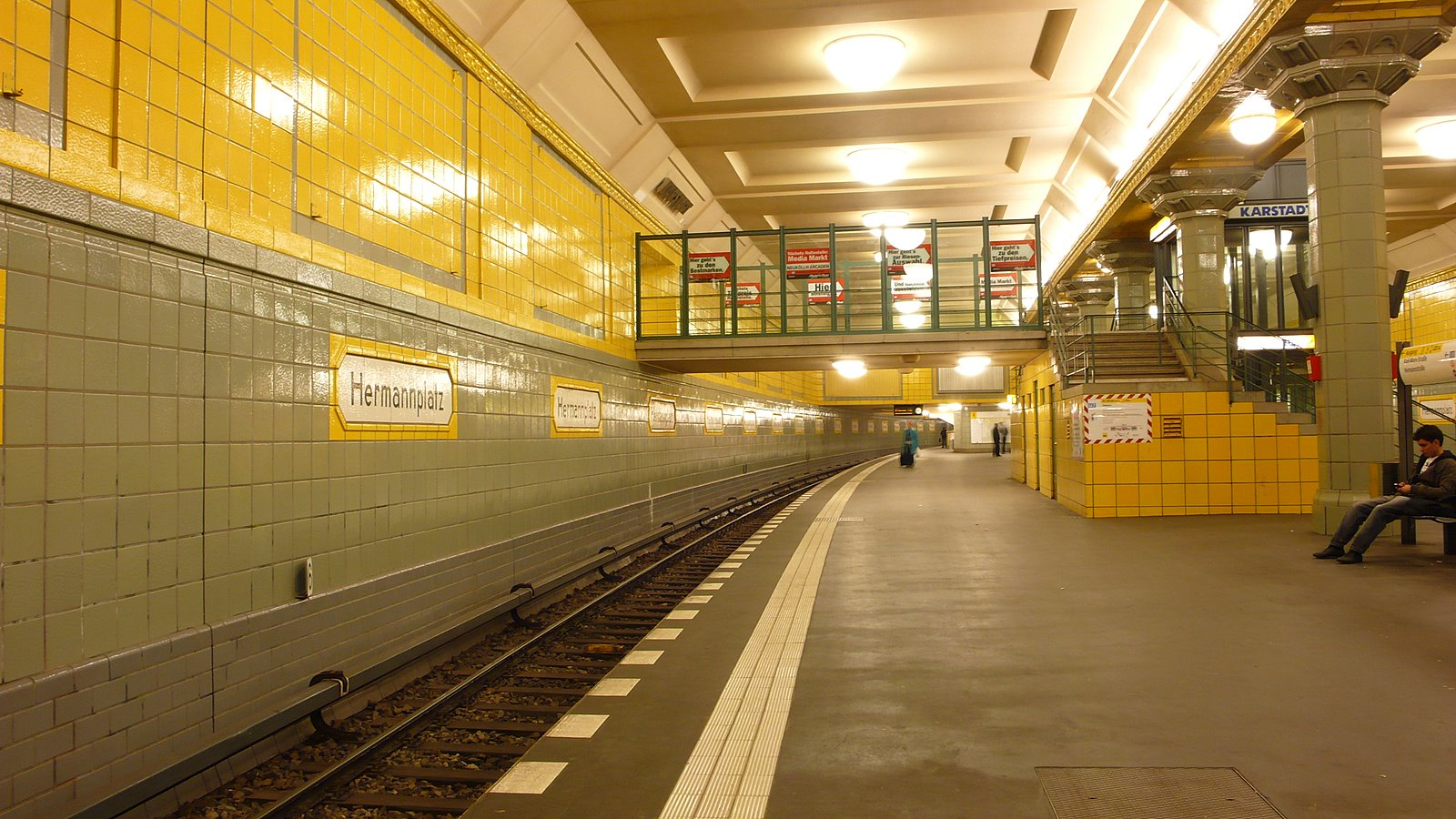
Platform of the U7

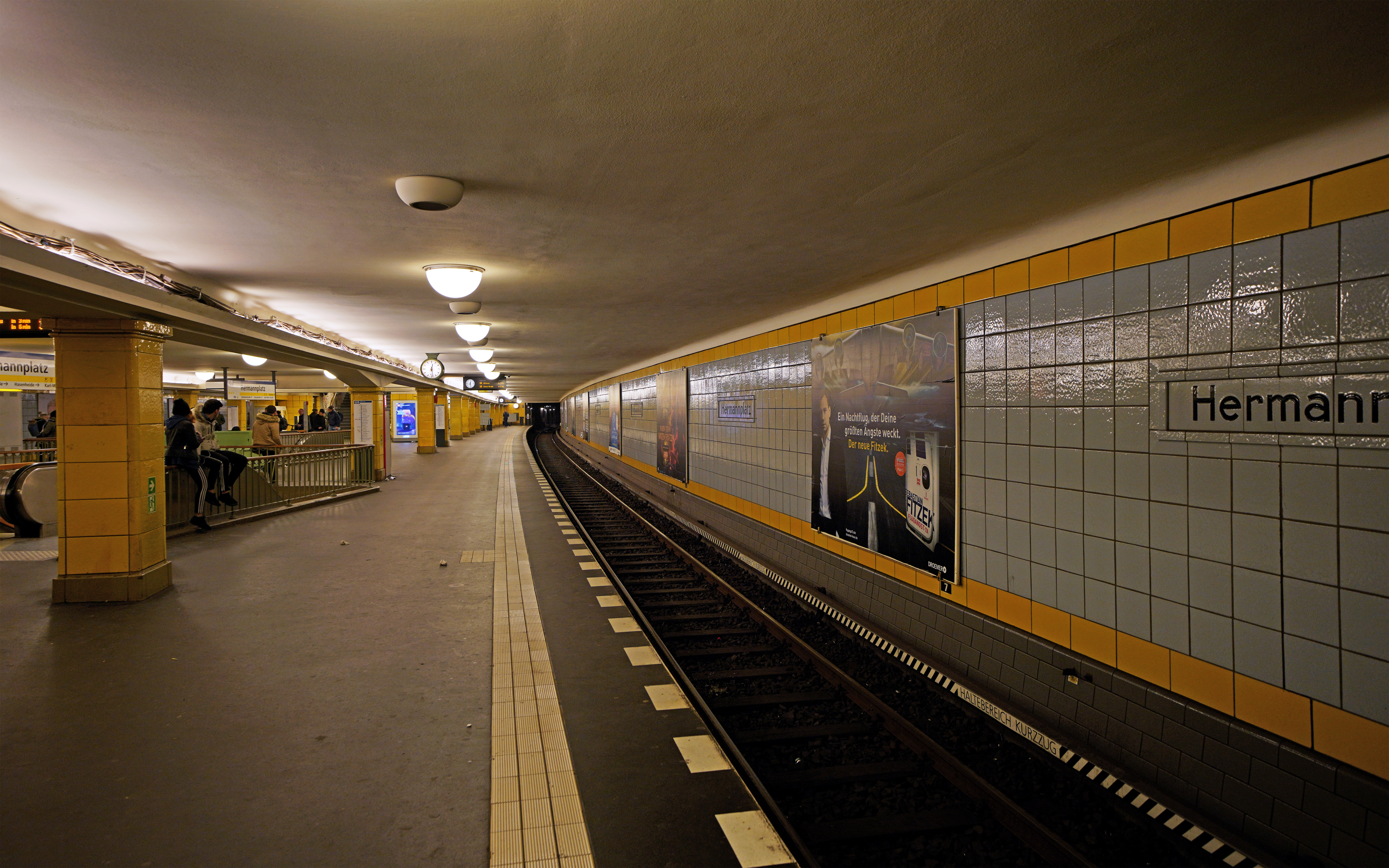
Platform of the U8

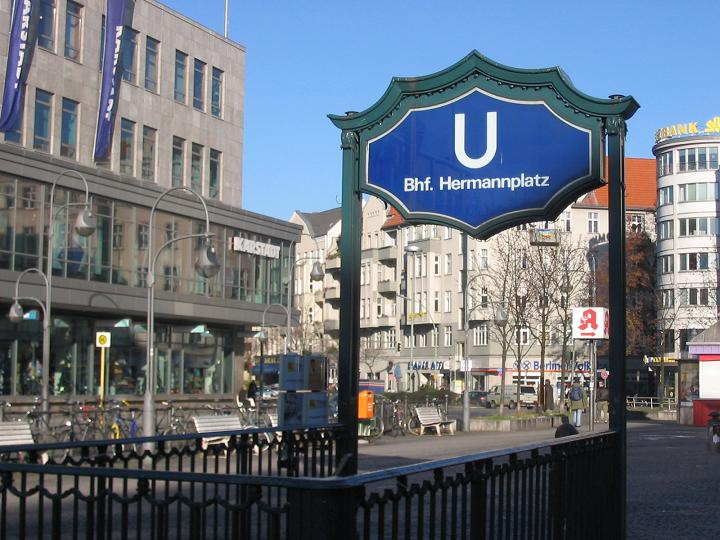
The entrance of U-Bahn station Hermannplatz

Hermannplatz station first opened on 11 April 1926 together with the rest of the newly built line between the stations Hasenheide and Bergstraße, which are today the U7 stations Südstern and Karl-Marx-Straße respectively. The second platform, built above the original, was opened on 17 July 1927 to serve what is now the U8 line. The station's architects were Alfred Grenander and Alfred Fehse. The station was the first on the Berlin network to be fitted with escalators, which connected the two platforms.

Unique that time was Karstadt department store got a tunnel for customers directly to its facility. Refer to U8 and Wertheim, rumors to have paid for change route around Moritzplatz to same station building connection.

Until 1930, tram lines were present on all the streets converging on Hermannplatz, and it was served by no fewer than 15 separate routes. In the following years however, there was a gradual reduction in tram provisioning in the former West Berlin, and the last tram ran to Hermannplatz on 1 October 1964.

Today, the square is a hub of activity in one of the most densely populated areas of Berlin. It has therefore retained its status as a transport hub, and is served by five bus lines during the day (two of which operate continuously) and four lines at night. On U7 the next station is Rathaus Neukölln or Südstern. On U8 the next station is Schönleinstraße or Boddinstraße. Located at the extreme southeast corner of the inner-city district of Kreuzberg, the square was and still is considered the gateway to Neukölln.

== See also ==
- Hermannplatz
