= Wrangelkiez =

Wrangelkiez, originally known as Schlesisches Viertel, is a Kiez (small neighbourhood) in the Kreuzberg quarter of Berlin, Germany. Wrangelkiez is centrally located within the borough of Friedrichshain-Kreuzberg bordering the Spree river. The population of the kiez is 12,400.

== Geography ==
Wrangelkiez covers an area of 45 hectares (0.45 km^{2}) and has a population density of 27,556/km2.

The area is bordered to the north-west by the Skalitzer Straße road, in the south-west by the Görlitzer Park, in the north-east by the Spree River and in the south-east by the Landwehr Canal.

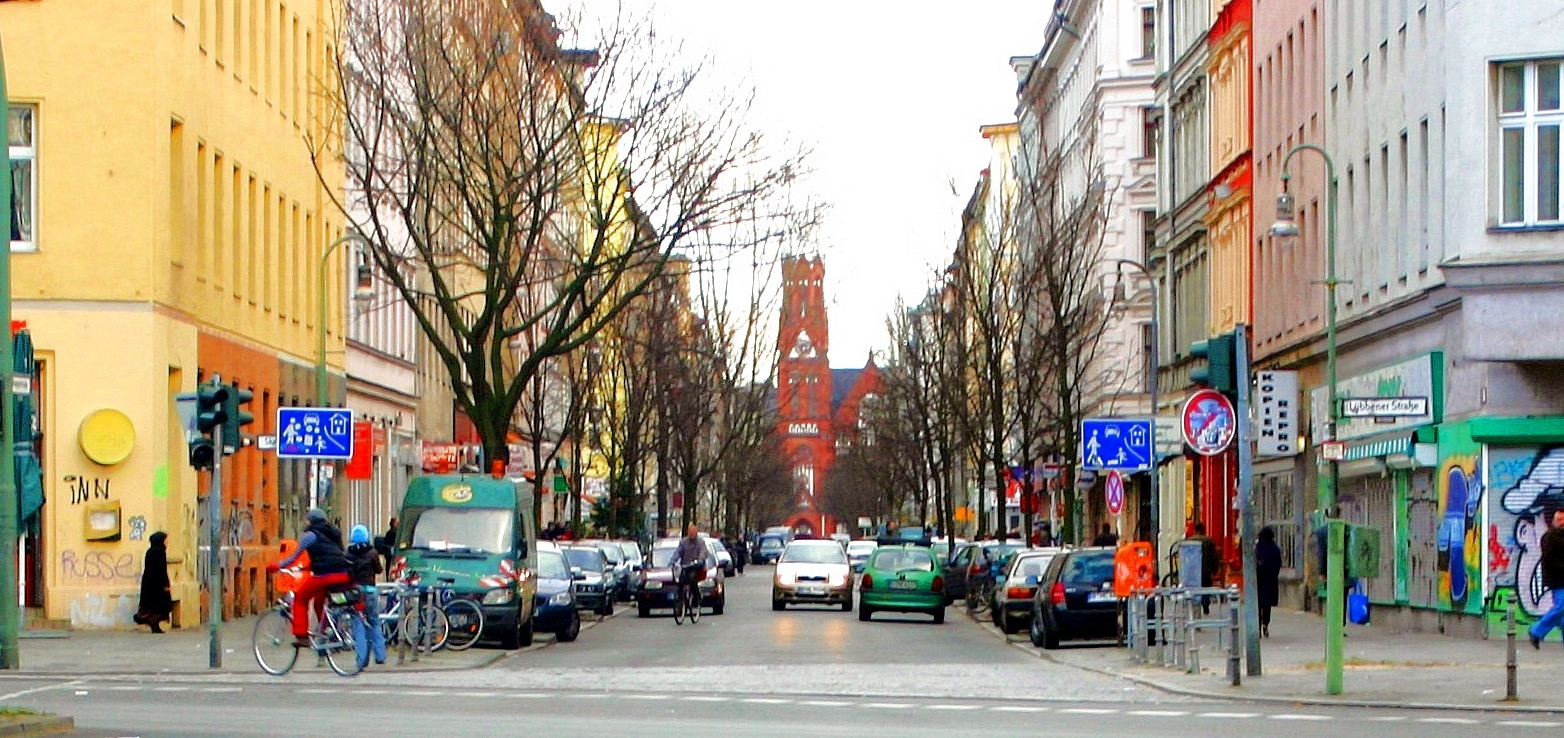
Wrangelstraße seen from Skalitzer Straße with Tabor Church in the background

== Demographics ==
Wrangelkiez has an above-average proportion of younger residents; with 34.2% of residents aged 18-35. It also has a high proportion of residents born overseas, particularly in other European countries.

== Culture ==
Since German reunification the area has undergone gentrification, but remains known for alternative lifestyles and counterculture. A number of nightclubs and bars are located within the neighborhood, which once included the well-known Watergate and Musik & Frieden, located on the banks of the Spree. The Ratibor Theater is also found within the district.

Tabor Church, a church of the Evangelical Church in Berlin, Brandenburg and Silesian Upper Lusatia is located within the neighbourhood.
