= Friedrichshain-Kreuzberg Museum =

History museum in Berlin, Germany

FHXB Friedrichshain-Kreuzberg Museum

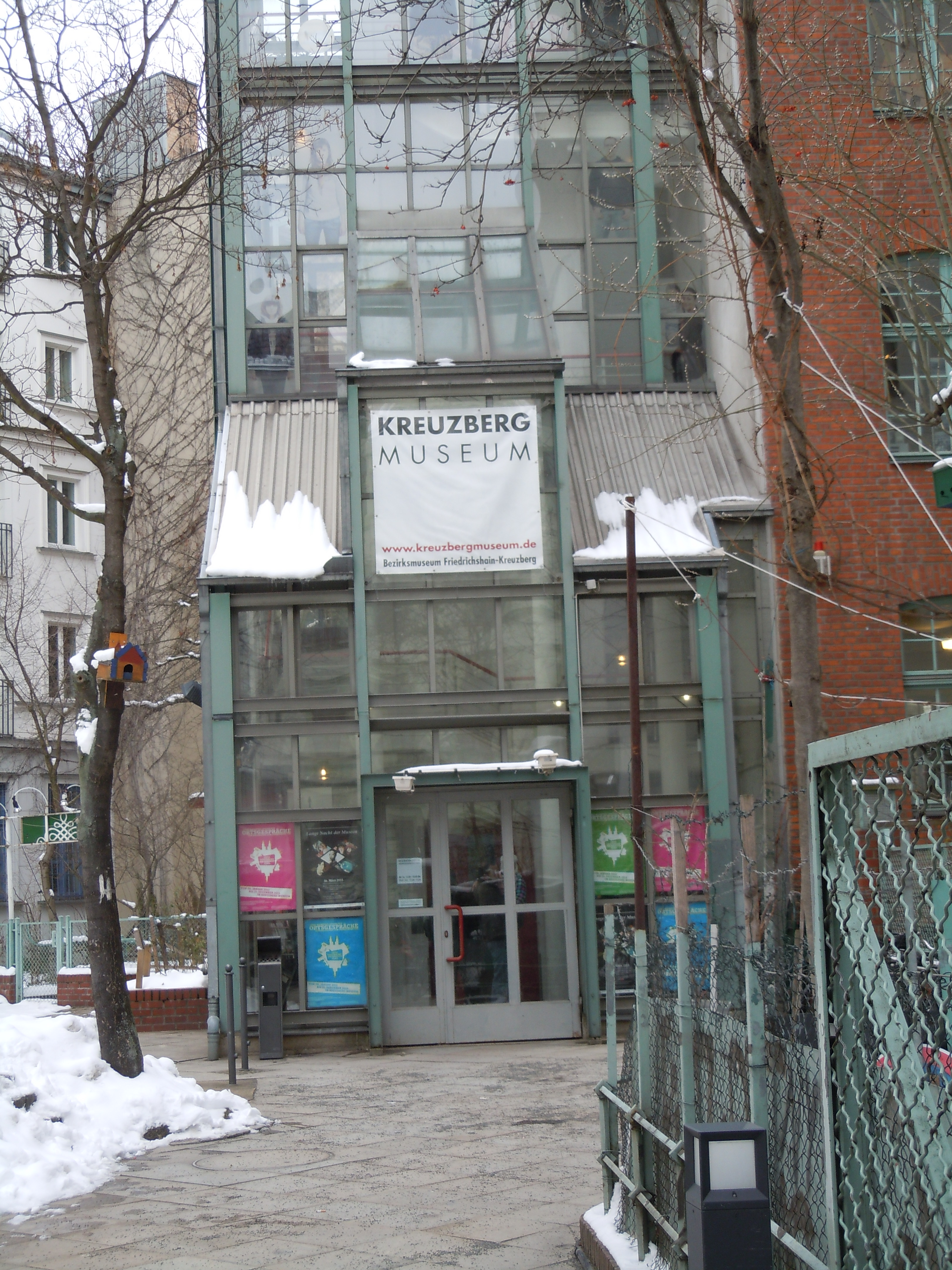
- Entrance to the museum
- Former name: Kreuzberg Museum für Stadtentwicklung und Sozialgeschichte
- Location: Berlin-Kreuzberg, Adalbertstraße 95A
- Coordinates: 52°30′02″N 13°25′06″E
- Type: Local history museum
- Founder: Martin Düspohl, Krista Tebbe
- Owner: Bezirksamt Friedrichshain-Kreuzberg
- Website: www.fhxb-museum.de

The FHXB Friedrichshain-Kreuzberg Museum is a local history museum focusing on the borough of Friedrichshain-Kreuzberg in Berlin, Germany. It contains a historical archive related to both parts of the district, permanent exhibits on urban development and social and immigration history, temporary exhibits on the district's past and present, and a historic printing press. The museum is part of the Culture and History Department within the district administration of Friedrichshain-Kreuzberg, and is located at Adalbertstrasse 95a in Kreuzberg.

== History ==
The Friedrichshain-Kreuzberg Museum is an amalgamation of the Kreuzberg Museum and the Heimatmuseum Friedrichshain.

The Verein zur Erforschung und Darstellung der Geschichte Kreuzbergs e.V. (Association to Research and Convey the History of Kreuzberg) was founded in 1978, laying the groundwork for the Kreuzberg Museum für Stadtentwicklung und Sozialgeschichte (Kreuzberg Museum for Urban Development and Social History). In connection with West Berlin's 750th anniversary celebrations in 1987, Kreuzberg received funds earmarked for a permanent position to head a neighborhood museum. Krista Tebbe, head of the Kreuzberg Arts Office, named Martin Düspohl as founding director of the museum-to-be. Düspohl was a co-founder of StattReisen Berlin e.V. and had participated in various projects with the Berliner Geschichtswerkstatt (Berlin History Workshop). The Kreuzberg Museum opened in 1991. With it, Düspohl and Tebbe aimed to take the idea of Heimatmuseum in a new direction: to draw connections between local everyday history and larger historical events; to democratize the writing of history by inviting local residents to participate; and to “dig where you’re standing” (Grabe, wo du stehst) – to look for history in unexpected, everyday places. Many of these impulses drew on the work of the Berliner Geschichtswerkstatt and other grassroots history initiatives.

The Heimatmuseum Friedrichshain was founded in the late 1980s as part of the Friedrichshain Arts Office. Until 2004 it was located in the “alte Feuerwache” at Marchlewskistrasse 6 in Friedrichshain.

Following Berlin's reunification and the 2001 reform of administrative districts, which fused Friedrichshain and Kreuzberg into one borough, the city decided to consolidate the two neighborhood museums. In 2004 the Heimatmuseum Friedrichshain was closed and its collection integrated into the Kreuzberg Museum, now under the new name Bezirksmuseum Friedrichshain-Kreuzberg (Borough Museum of Friedrichshain-Kreuzberg). On 12 April 2013, the institution was renamed FHXB Friedrichshain-Kreuzberg Museum.

Martin Düspohl headed the museum from its founding until February 2017, when he left to join the curatorial team of the Berlin Exhibit in the Humboldt Forum. The immigration scholar Natalie Bayer became museum director in January 2018.

=== Building ===
Since its opening in 1991, the Kreuzberg Museum has occupied a former factory building on Adalbertstrasse. The five-story brick building was constructed in the early 1920s on the lot of a residential building, and was originally used to produce furniture (by the firm Reinicke & Fähnrich) and wire fencing (by the firm Ritzmann, owned by Wildenhayn). The wire fencing factory existed until the end of the Second World War and was run by the wife of the owner.

Before it became a museum, the building underwent extensive renovations and modernization. The empty lots where residential buildings had stood until 1970 were transformed into a garden. A glass stairwell with an elevator was constructed as the new building entrance, making the museum accessible to people with physical disabilities.

== Permanent exhibitions ==
Geschichte wird gemacht! Abriss und Aufbruch am Kottbusser Tor 1945–2015 (Making History! Demolition and Protest at Kottbusser Tor 1945–2015), concentrates on protest movements and urban redevelopment in SO36. The area around the Kottbusser Tor, named after a former postal district (Southeast 36), was the focus of urban renewal for over 40 years until 2003. The often dilapidated Gründerzeit buildings were set to be demolished and replaced by residential high-rises in accordance with the motto, “Air, light, sun!” In this vein, city planners succeeded in redeveloping Kottbusser Tor by tearing down the surrounding buildings, changing the flow of traffic, and constructing the massive New Kreuzberg Center residential and commercial complex. In the 1970s and 1980s, partially in response to the New Kreuzberg Center, the alternative movement initiated broad protests against this form of urban renewal through demonstrations and widespread squatting, with eventual success.

The original version of this exhibit, which opened in 2001, was created in cooperation with about 60 Kreuzberg residents and was based in part on their memories and perspectives. In 2015 the FHXB Museum undertook a renewal of the exhibit to include the period from 2001 to 2015, with a focus on Kreuzberg's drastic gentrification. The new version also sought to place greater emphasis on the establishment of immigrant, particularly Turkish, communities in Kreuzberg as guest workers settled in the neighborhood from the 1960s onward.

In January 2012, the FHXB Museum opened Ortsgespräche. stadt – migration – geschichte (Local Chats. City – Migration – History) on the second and third floors. This exhibit focuses on the history of concrete, everyday locations in the borough as intersecting spaces of migration. Migration is understood here as an integral part of the history of Friedrichshain-Kreuzberg. Visitors are invited to record their own stories in the museum's recording studio and thereby expand the content of the exhibit. Ortsgespräche was curated by Lorraine Bluche and Frauke Miera in collaboration with countless residents of Friedrichshain-Kreuzberg. In early 2017 the FHXB Museum disassembled the second floor of the exhibit to make room for special exhibitions. The content has been integrated into the third floor as the virtual tour “Ortsgeschichten” (Local Histories).

== Past temporary exhibitions ==
The museum's exhibitions on regional history have often focused on immigration and its importance for Friedrichshain and Kreuzberg.

The groundbreaking exhibit Wir waren die Ersten ... Türkiye‘den Berlin‘e (We Were the First ... From Turkey to Berlin, on view 2000 to 2002) used interviews to explore the lives and perspectives of Kreuzbergers who arrived in Berlin as guest workers in the mid-1960s. Kreuzberg SO 36 had and still has the highest concentration of Turkish immigrants in the city. Beginning with this exhibit, the guest worker agreements and their implications for the labor structures and demographics of Kreuzberg assumed a prominent place in the museum's examination of local history. In addition, the networks established through the exhibit became an integral resource for the institution. Most recently the exhibit Alman Geschichteler – Gastarbaijteri erzählen (2016–17) by the Gegennarrativ collective delved into the ambivalence of guest workers’ experiences in Kreuzberg through in-depth interviews.

Ein jeder nach seiner Façon. 300 Jahre Zuwanderung nach Friedrichshain-Kreuzberg (To Each His Own: 300 Years of Immigration to Friedrichshain-Kreuzberg, on view 2005 to 2010) documented how poverty, war and persecution forced people to leave their home countries to start new lives in Berlin, from the Huguenot and Bohemian religious refugees in the 18th century to asylum seekers in the 21st century. Particular emphasis was placed on forced deportation, flight, and expulsion during and because of the Second World War, as well as labor migration from Turkey to Kreuzberg and from Vietnam to Friedrichshain during the second half of the 20th century.

More recently, Letters of Stone (June to November 2017) examined the fate of a Kreuzberg Jewish family, the Robinskis, during the Nazi period. While some family members were able to emigrate to South Africa, others remained in Berlin and corresponded about their increasingly dire situation through written letters, which formed the basis of the exhibit.

From November 2017 to January 2018 the museum showed Andere Heimaten: Herkunft und Migrationsrouten von Drogenverkäufern in Berliner Parks (Other Homelands: Origins and Migration Routes of Berlin Park Drug Sellers), developed by the artist Scott Holmquist at the museum's invitation. For the exhibit Holmquist interviewed people selling drugs in Görlitzer Park and Hasenheide about the specific cities, towns and villages they came from, as well as the stations of their journey to Berlin. He did not pose questions about their motivations, feelings, or current occupations. The exhibit consisted of 13 descriptions of these origin locations, each in the native language of the respective interviewee, juxtaposed with an extensive collection of media depictions of park drug sellers. Using a travel portal created for the exhibit, visitors could plan reverse journeys from Berlin to the highlighted places. Members of the CDU tried to officially shut down the exhibition shortly before its opening. The project received a great deal of national and international media attention and brought the museum an extraordinary rush of visitors.

== Archive ==
The FHXB Museum's local historical archive contains photos, documents, files, and objects, and provides support and consultation for scholars, teachers and students, history workshops, and lay researchers.

In three projects funded by the European Union and the Berlin Senate, the archive was able to digitize its most important collections and publish a large portion of them online. These are: documents, posters, and flyers related to urban renewal and social movements in Kreuzberg, 1970–1990; 25,000 negative photos by Jürgen Henschel of “Leftist Berlin,” 1959–1991; interviews with contemporary witnesses on their immigration to Friedrichshain and Kreuzberg; works by the artists’ group Kreuzberg Boheme; a collection of scrapbooks from the Heimatmuseum Friedrichshain; and documentation of the exhibit Juden in Kreuzberg (Jews in Kreuzberg, on view 1991).

The museum archive also includes negatives from the Mathesie photo studio at Adalbertstr. 11, which closed its doors in 1993 after nearly 50 years. A selection of these studio portraits, which provide a cross-section of Kreuzberg society, was published in the book Jetzt Lächeln! Atelierfotografie am Beispiel Mathesie – Eine Enzyklopädie and shown in a corresponding exhibit.

== Further offerings ==
On the ground floor of the five-story building is a historic typesetting room and printing shop, which are used for children's workshops and adult education courses.

The museum offers walking tours of the neighborhood through the “X-Berg-Tag” program, conceived of and led by young people from Kreuzberg to counteract the common media portrayal of the area as dangerous and problem-riddled. The tour guides highlight their individual experiences and perspectives, particularly through locations that hold special importance for the Turkish or Arab communities.
