= Scott Holmquist =

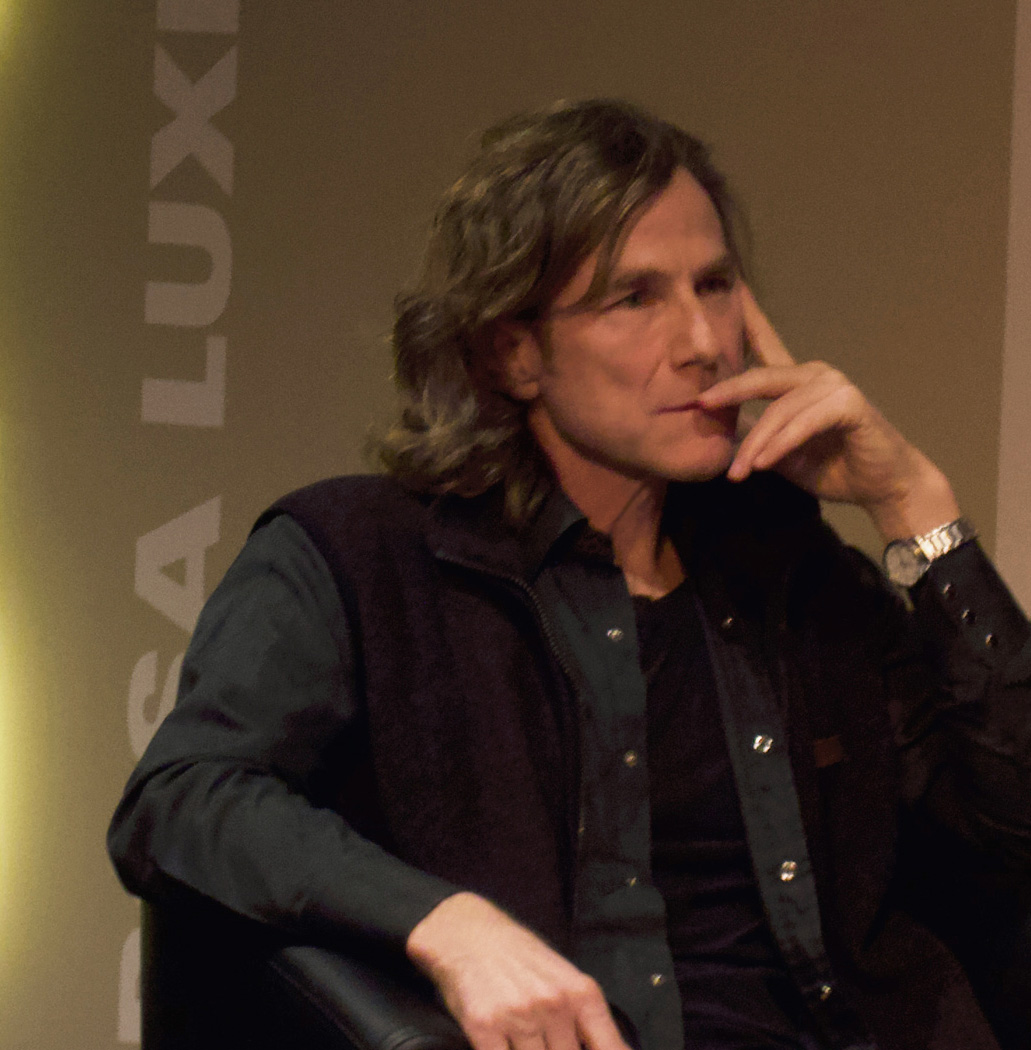
- Scott Holmquist in a panel discussion at Rosa-Luxemburg-Stiftung Salon Berlin, 2018
- Born: Minneapolis, USA
- Other name: willy mal
- Known for: research art
- Website: scottholmquist.com

Scott Holmquist (born in Minneapolis) is a conceptual artist who produces books, archives, and multi-media installations. He is best known for his work on African immigrant drug dealers in Berlin and Northern California cannabis growers.

== Life ==
Holmquist grew up in Minneapolis, where he worked summers in the building trades with his father. Besides the US, he has lived in Sweden and France, residing in Berlin, Germany, since 2011. He reads and speaks French, German, and Swedish.

He studied the socialist economics of Sweden's Löntagarfonderna (Employee funds) at the University of Gothenburg and social theory at the University of California, Berkeley. He has worked as a researcher for the Institute for Policy Studies in Washington DC.

== Work ==
Holmquist's work has received considerable media and institutional attention. Research on the Swedish raggare led to invitations to speak on the subject at Stockholm's Nordic Museum (Nordiska Museet). In 2013 The Washington Post described his work in Peace.Love.Insurgency. as "political yet whimsical."

About Holmquist's 2014 solo exhibition, The Third Wall and the Last Hero at Berlin's Kreuzberg Museum, Lothar Müller observed in the Süddeutsche Zeitung "[Holmquist has] monumentalised the insurgency of cannabis growers in Northern California against the U.S. government in the form of art books, then moved across the Atlantic and immersed himself in the revolutionary spirit of Kreuzberg."

In 2016 Artnet reported that Holmquist's petition for a "monument to be erected in a park in the district of Friedrichshain-Kreuzberg in honor of African drug dealers [...] even gained political support" referring to the Pirate Party, then in Berlin government. Dozens of media outlets in several countries covered the intervention. In 2017 Holmquist's Other Homelands: Origins and Migration Routes of Berlin Park Drug Dealers supported by the Rosa Luxemburg Stiftung, provoked outrage and received support across Germany.

In October 2017, CDU Berlin political leaders initiated proceedings in the district assembly to oblige the FHXB Friedrichshain-Kreuzberg Museum to cancel the Other Homelands exhibition. These efforts were thwarted by Green and Left Party assembly members.

Holmquist's March 2019 exhibition DEALER POSES: Photographed and Remembered at the IG Bildende Kunst gallery," Vienna, Austria, elaborated on the themes of how public drug dealing is represented in dozens of collages made from press photos including those used to illustrate articles on the artist's exhibitions and interventions, for instance proposing a monument to the park drug dealer.

On 27 October 2019 Holmquist organised a twenty-four hour, "Park Dealer Solidarity Sit-in" art action in Berlin's Görlitzer Park for which he erected his LAST HERO statue. "It's about how the reactions to park drug dealers crystallise fears, temptations, and desires, and at the same time shift the boundaries of control and solidarity," said Holmquist.

== Influence ==
German culture critic Andreas Kilb used Holmquist's Last Hero work in his discussion of Burhan Qurbani's 2020 film adaption of Alfred Döblin's modernist classic, Berlin Alexanderplatz in the 15 July 2020, Frankfurter Allgemeine Zeitung."

== Selected artist books and publications ==
- Low Tide – object index draft 2 (2014)
- BGzSReb und BuUmZoG Jahre 2090 (Laws Protecting and Promoting German Traditions of Rebellion and Squatting Zones High Income Urban Districts - Year 2090), for the exhibition Peace.Love.Insurgency. (2013)
- Hippies & Weed Portable Insurgent, "chronic freedom series," book – sound-images broadsheet (2013)
- chronic freedom, "chronic freedom series" (2010)
- Hot Cars and Cool Media: The Swedish Raggare Subculture, In: The Global Village: Dead or Alive? ed. Ray Brown and Marshall Fishwick (1999, Bowling Green State University Popular Press)
- 'Pope in transit; dictator 'in transition,' In These Times (April 29, 1987)
- Vital Resources: An Annotated Bibliography in Community Economic Development, Community Information Exchange, National Urban Coalition and Institute for Policy Studies (1987)

== Organizations ==
- Co-founder of the Humboldt Area Peoples Archive, Eureka, CA.
- Founding board member of The Queer Library, Berlin, Germany
