= Paul-Lincke-Ufer =

Street in Berlin's Kreuzberg quarter

Coordinates: 52°29′37.16″N 13°25′45.72″E

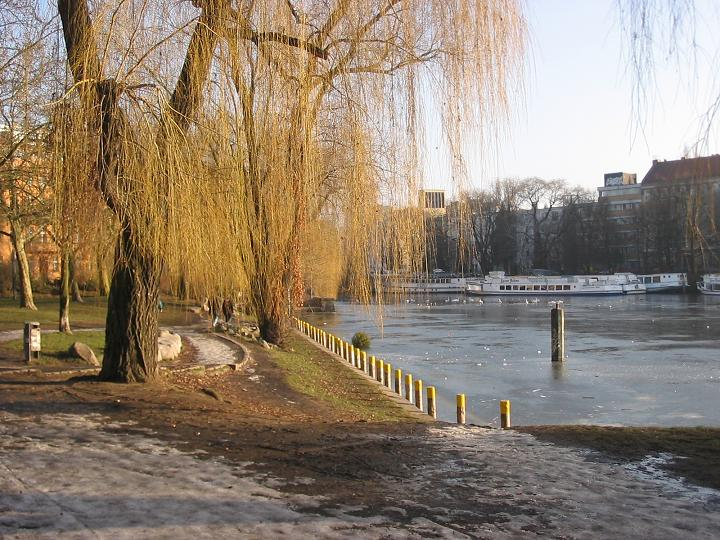
Waterside of the Landwehr Canal in Kreuzberg

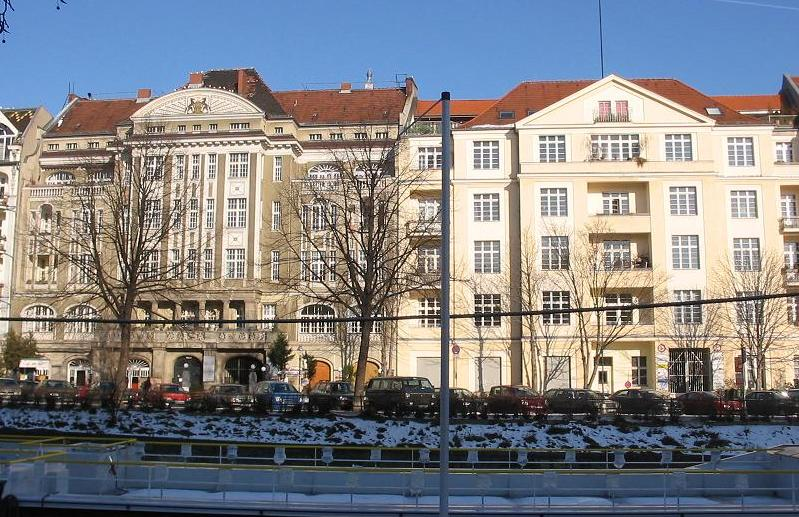
View of Maybachufer on the Landwehrkanal

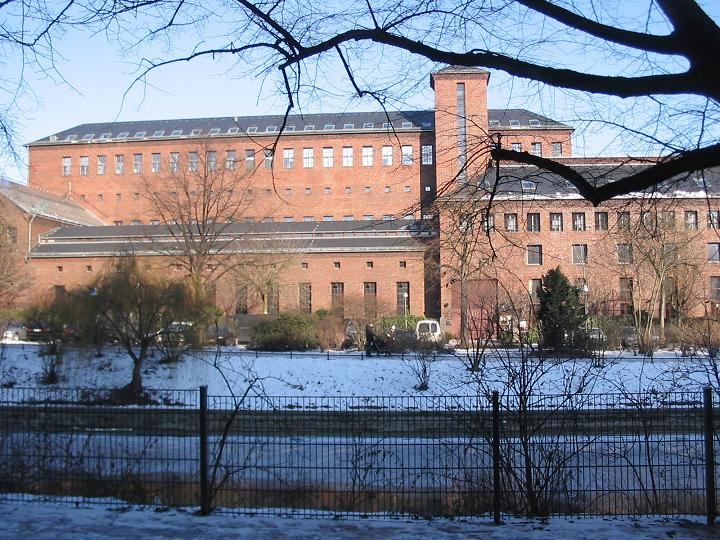
Cathedral of Electricity, the listed former electricity substation on Paul-Lincke-Ufer, built in 1926–1928 by Hans Heinrich Müller

Paul-Lincke-Ufer is a street in Berlin running along the Landwehr Canal in the Kreuzberg quarter of the city. The street runs from Kottbusser Brücke all the way to the Treptow Canal. Opposite it is the Maybach Ufer where the Turkish Market takes place on Tuesday, Friday and some Saturdays.

== History ==
The street came into being with the creation of the Landwehr Canal, a parallel channel to the Spree river dug in 1845–1850. It was named Kottbusser Ufer until 1946 when it was named after Paul Lincke, the composer of operettas and songs such as "The Glow-Worm" and of the unofficial anthem of the city, "Berliner Luft".

The street was part of the American Sector of West Berlin. It became part of the most important Turkish community in Berlin.

Nearly all the buildings on the bank survived the destruction of World War II and therefore represent an important architectural monument to early 20th-century architecture of Berlin.

Notable people associated with the canal include Rosa Luxemburg, who was murdered and thrown into the canal. Notable buildings include at Paul-Linke-Ufer 20-22, a listed building from 1929, a former electricity substation designed by architect Hans Heinrich Müller. Due to the combination of Industrial and Gothic elements, the building became known as the "Cathedral of Electricity". The Bernstein piano factory lies just behind the Paul-Lincke-Ufer.

The current postcode is 10999, though it used to be SO36, which is also the name of a club in the area.

== Places and buildings of interest ==
- Umspann Werk
- Boule Platz
