= Böckler Park =

Park in Berlin, Germany

Coordinates: 52.4972°N 13.4079°E

- Böcklerpark
- Interactive map of Böckler Park
- Location: Kreuzberg, Berlin, Germany

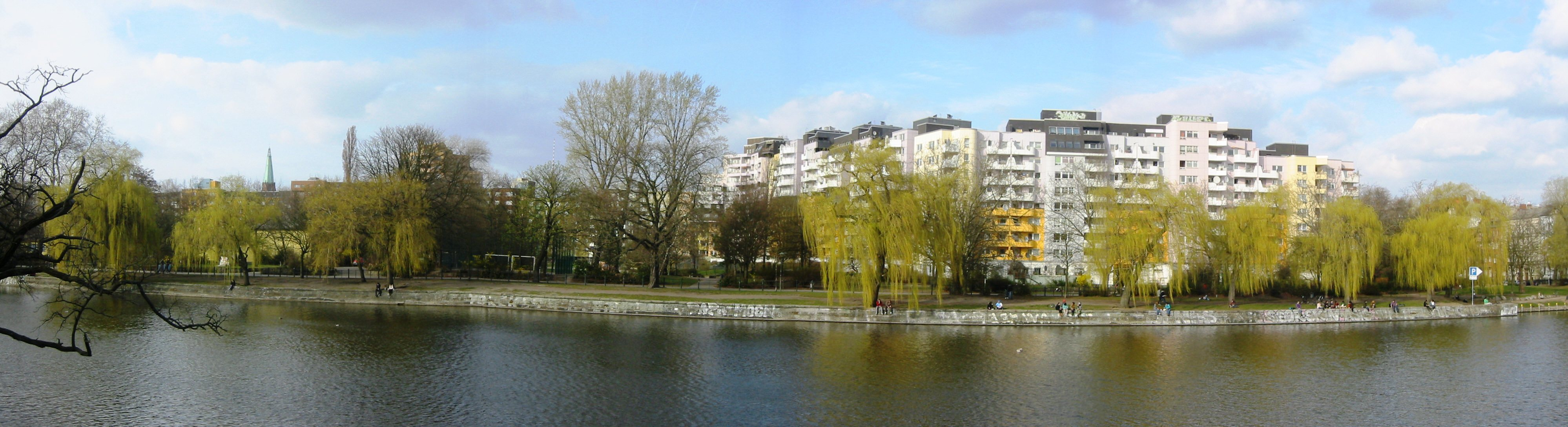
The park in 2011

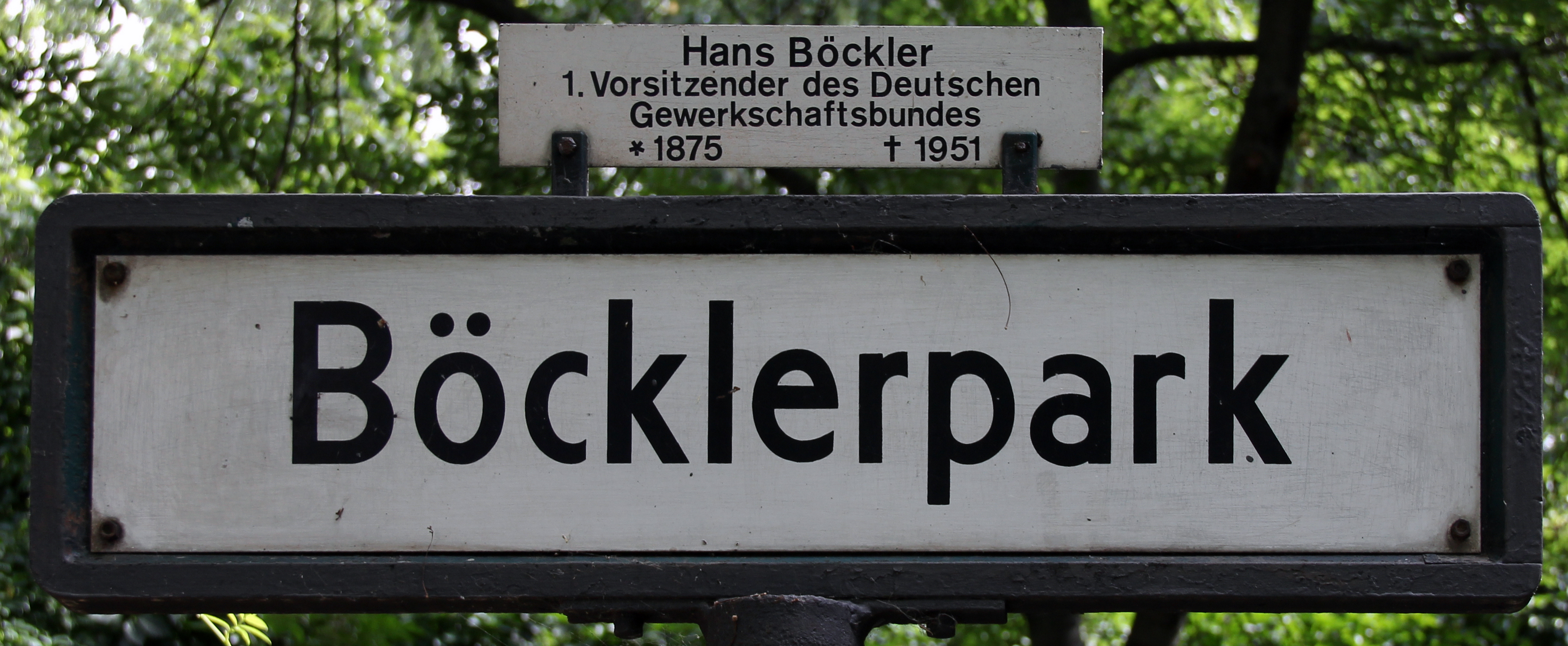
Park signage in 2013

Böckler Park (German: Böcklerpark) is a park in Kreuzberg, Berlin, Germany.
