= Tabor Church =

- Taborkirche
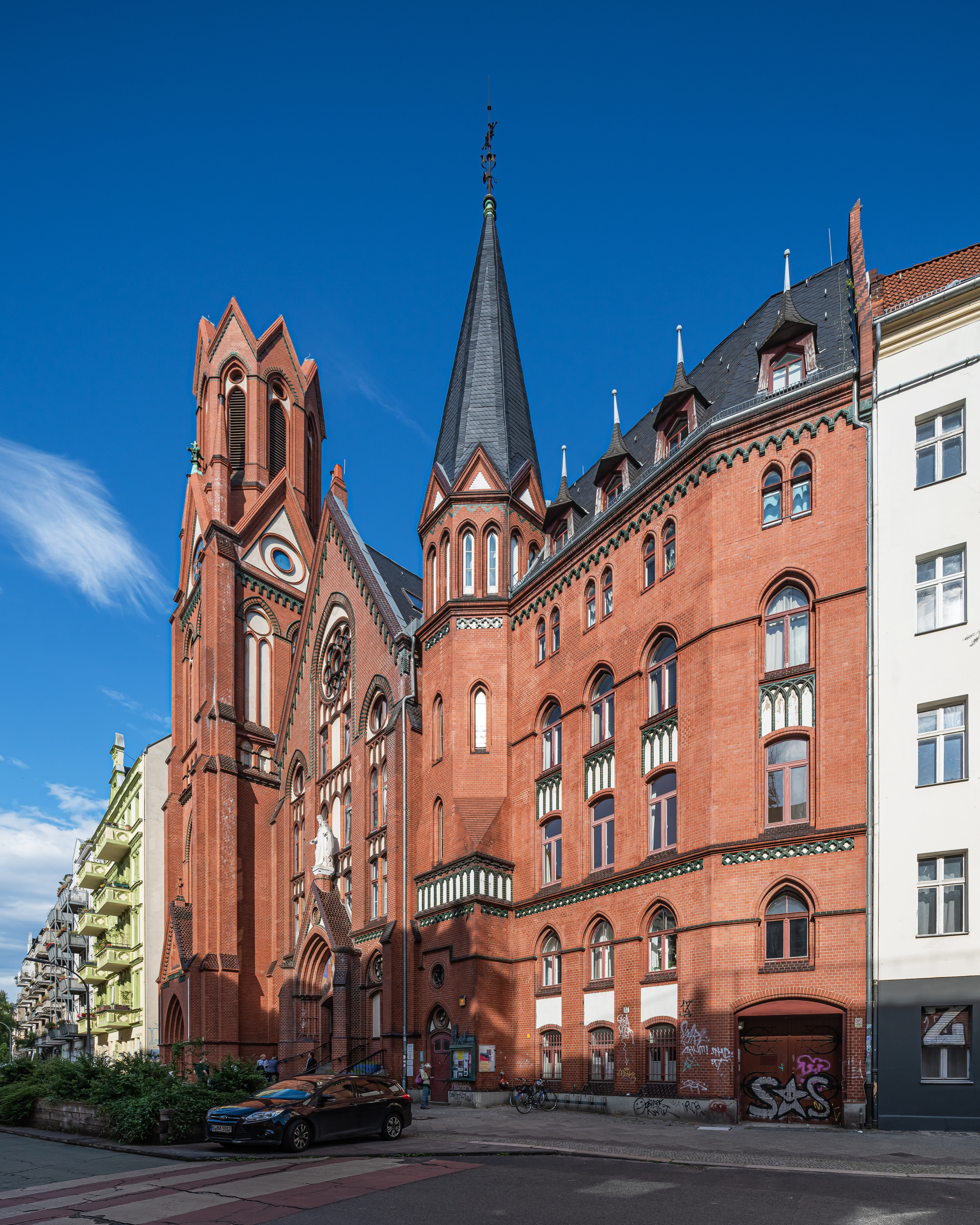
- Tabor Church with the tower stump

Religion
- Affiliation: United Protestant
- District: Sprengel Berlin, Kirchenkreis Berlin Stadtmitte
- Province: Evangelical Church of Berlin-Brandenburg-Silesian Upper Lusatia

Location
- Location: Wrangelkiez, Kreuzberg, Berlin, Germany
- Interactive map of Tabor Church
- Coordinates: 52°29′48″N 13°26′46″E

Architecture
- Architect: Ernst Schwartzkopff
- Style: neo-Brick Gothic
- Completed: 1905
- Materials: brick

Website
- www.evtaborgemeinde.de

Tabor Church (German: Taborkirche) is the church of the Evangelical Tabor Congregation, a member of the Protestant umbrella organisation Evangelical Church of Berlin-Brandenburg-Silesian Upper Lusatia. The church building is located in Wrangelkiez in the Berlin borough of Friedrichshain-Kreuzberg. The church was named in memory of the Transfiguration of Jesus, which allegedly took place on Mount Tabor הר תבור in today's Israel.

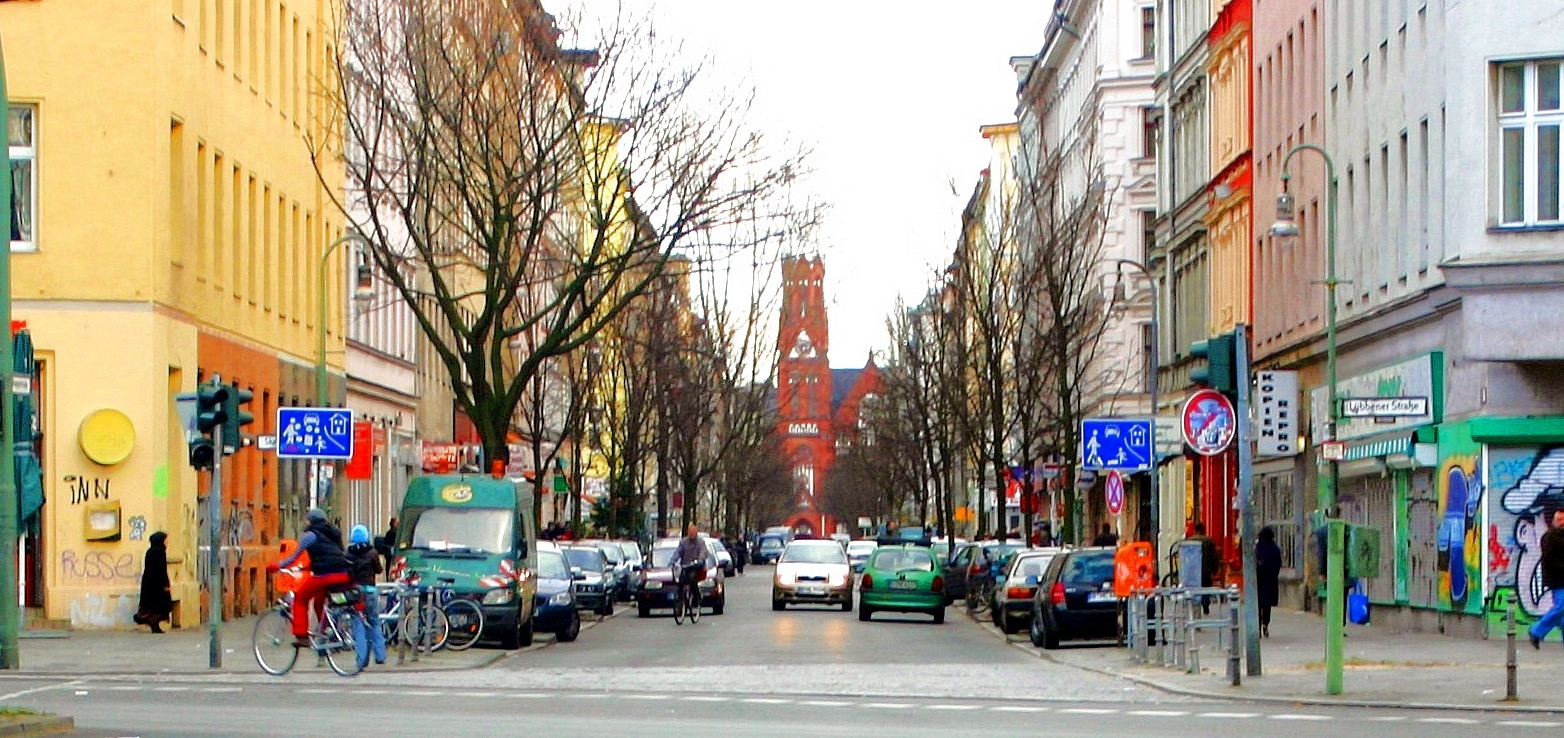
View from northwest through Wrangelstraße towards the tower stump of Tabor Church.

The parish's district belonged to the Congregation of Emmaus Church (part of today's Emmaus-Mount of Olives Congregation). Due to the high number of parishioners the district was divided into subsections by 1904, which were provided their own prayer halls. The future Tabor parish then used to be called Emmaus North.

== The Church Building ==
On 1 June 1903 the cornerstone for Tabor Church was laid. Baurat Ernst Schwartzkopff designed the plans. The church is inserted into the alignment of houses in Taborstraße, but facing Wrangelstraße, a long street directed northwest starting opposite of the church façade. The tower of originally 71 m height was built to be a landmark viewable through all of Wrangelstraße. Due to the position of the site inserted between neighbouring houses the quire of the church is not properly oriented, but directed to the southeast.

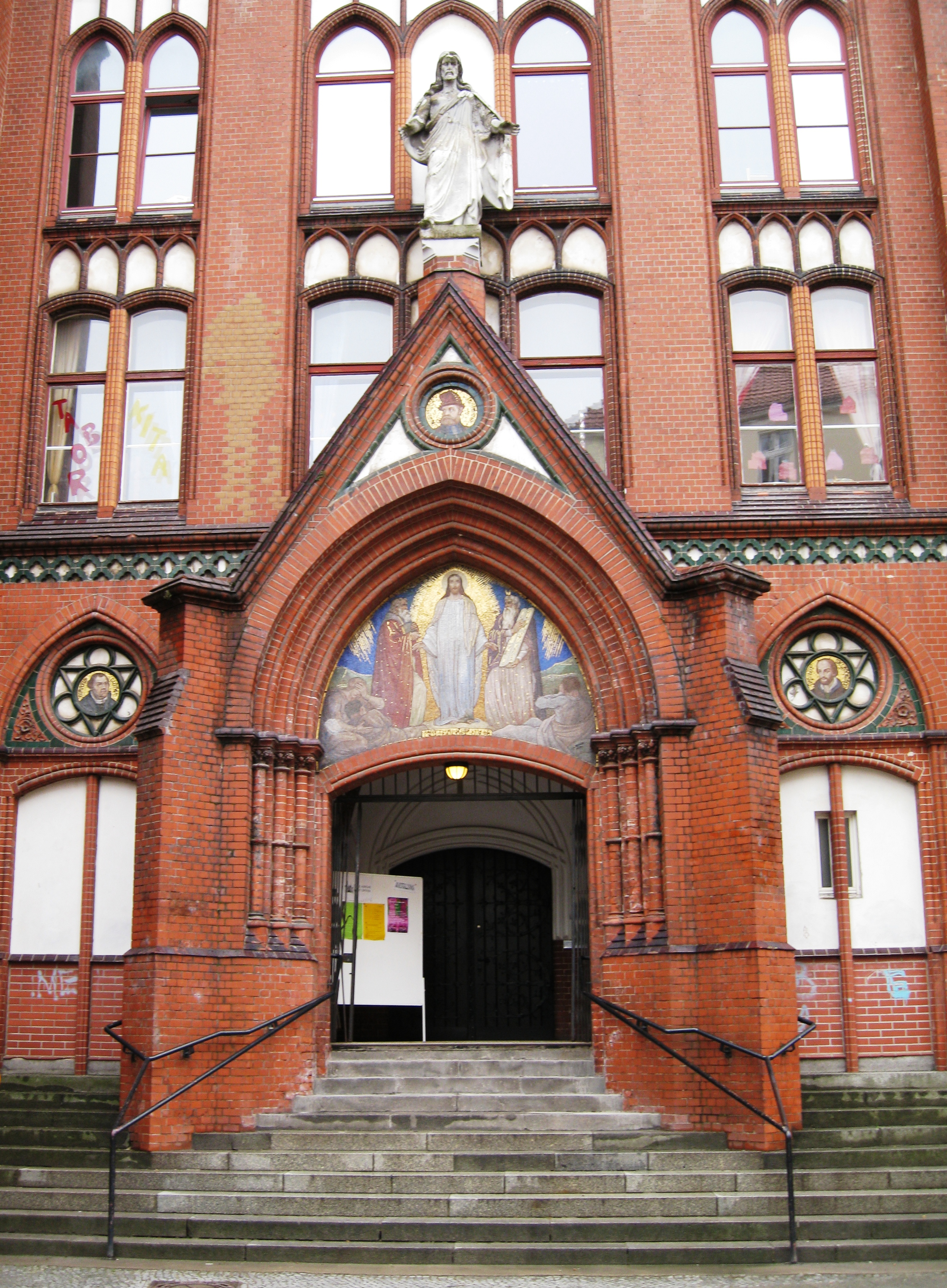
Church portal with Jesus statue by Julius Wucherer (1905-copy after Thorvaldsen)

Schwartzkopff died before finishing his work and thus Baurat Adolph Bürkner accomplished the constructions. The Evangelischer Kirchenbauverein (Evangelical Association for the Construction of Churches), a charitable organisation then headed by Empress Augusta Victoria, financed the constructions.

The church was inaugurated on 20 December 1905. In 1906 the parish subsection Emmaus North was legally established as the parish Tabor Congregation, becoming the proprietor of Tabor Church.

The church is built from red brick stones in anachronistic neo-Brick Gothic style. A trass statue of Jesus of Nazareth by Julius Wucherer (a 1905-copy after Bertel Thorvaldsen) stands on top of the entrance portal. The street section of the building includes apartments. The prayer hall is built as a centralized auditory hall, typical for Protestant church architecture. The prayer hall is topped by a central stellar vault with a skylight.

The church weathered the Second World War with little damage. But the high conic spire of the tower had been shortened after considerable damage. The remaining stump consists of the massive brick stone construction of the lower parts of the tower.

== Furnishings as of 1905 ==
Wall paintings with scenes from birth and resurrection of Jesus by Birkle & Thomer, mosaic tympana at the portals by A. Becker.

== The Cemetery of Tabor Congregation in formerly East German Ahrensfelde ==
Tabor Congregation, located in what used to be West Berlin, has its own graveyard section in the denominational Eastern Churchyard (German: Ostkirchhof Ahrensfelde) in formerly East Berlin's eastern suburb of Ahrensfelde. Between May 27, 1952 and 3 October 1972 West Berliners were banned from free access to the East German German Democratic Republic proper – as distinguished from East Berlin. In this time all West Berliners, wishing to visit the grave of a late relative or friend in the cemeteries in East Germany, were excluded, as well as late widows and widowers, who wanted to be buried side by side with their earlier deceased spouses buried there. Between 1972 and December 22, 1989 West Berliners had restricted access, because they had to apply for East German visas and to pay for a compulsory exchange (officially in German: Mindestumtausch, i.e. minimum exchange).
