= Kreuzberg =

District of Berlin, Germany

- Quarter of Berlin
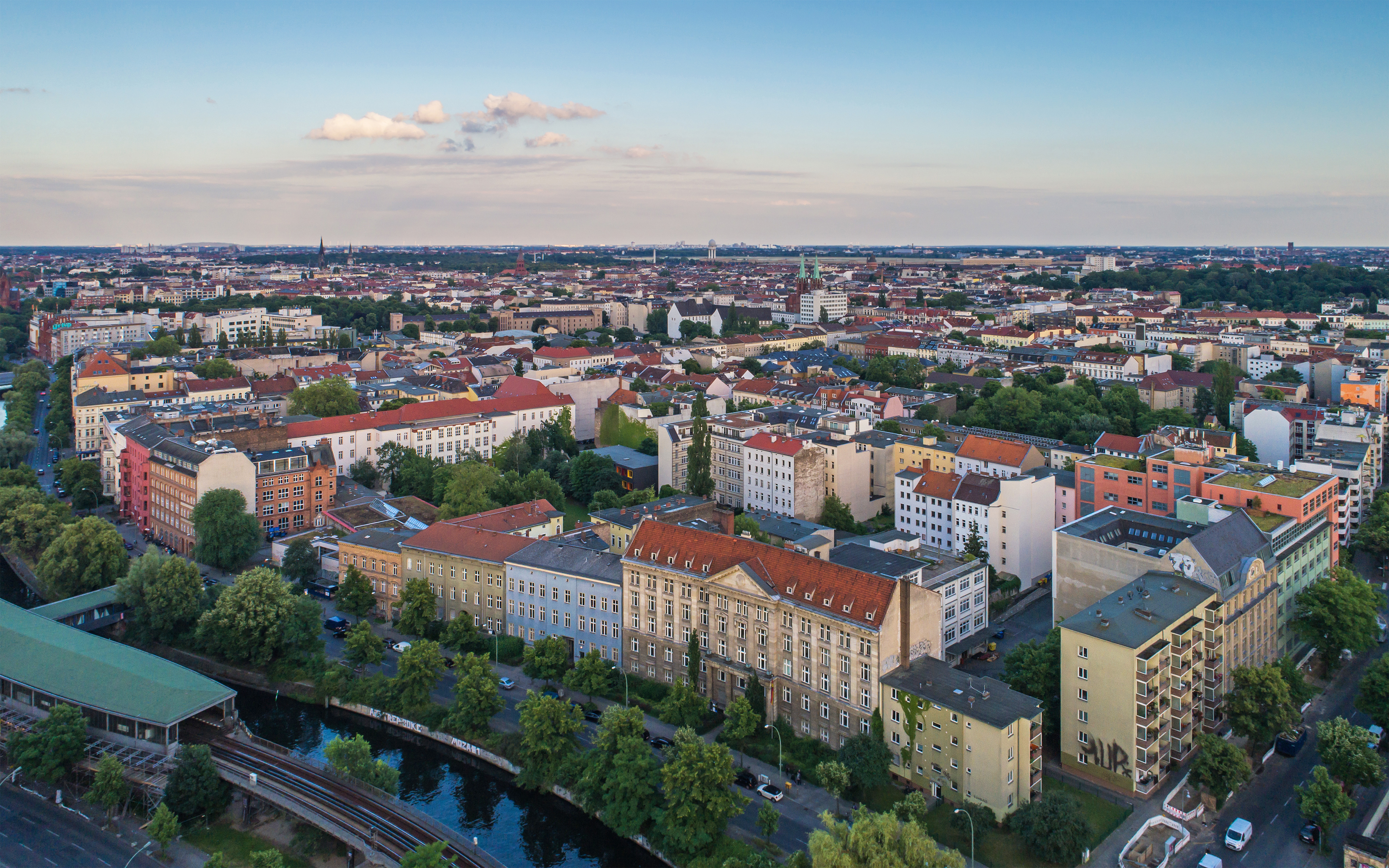
- Aerial photo

- Coat of arms

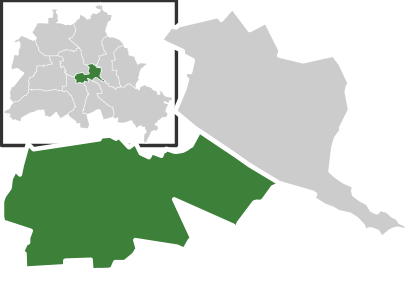
- Location of Kreuzberg in Friedrichshain-Kreuzberg and Berlin
- Interactive map of Kreuzberg
- Location within Germany Location within Berlin
- Coordinates: 52°29′15″N 13°23′00″E
- Country: Germany
- State: Berlin
- City: Berlin
- Borough: Friedrichshain-Kreuzberg
- Founded: 1920
- Subdivisions: 2 zones

Area
  - Total: 10.4 km^{2} (4.0 sq mi)
- Elevation: 52 m (171 ft)

Population (2024-12-31)
  - Total: 151,418
  - Density: 14,600/km^{2} (37,700/sq mi)
- Time zone: UTC+01:00 (CET)
  - Summer (DST): UTC+02:00 (CEST)
- Postal codes: 10961, 10963, 10965, 10967, 10997, 10999, 10969
- Vehicle registration: B

Kreuzberg (German pronunciation: [ˈkʁɔʏtsbɛʁk]) is a district of Berlin, Germany. It is part of the Friedrichshain-Kreuzberg borough located south of Mitte. During the Cold War era, it was one of the poorest areas of West Berlin, but since German reunification in 1990, it has undergone significant gentrification and is now known for its vibrant arts scene.

The borough is known for its high percentage of immigrants and descendants of immigrants, many of whom are of Turkish ancestry. This influx began in the 1960s and 1970s when West Germany invited 'Gastarbeiter' (guest workers) from various countries, including Turkey, Italy, Greece, and Yugoslavia, to address labour shortages and aid in post-war reconstruction. As of 2006, 31.6% of Kreuzberg's inhabitants did not have German citizenship. Kreuzberg is known for its diverse cultural life and experimental alternative lifestyles, making it an attractive area for many. However, some parts of the district are still characterised by higher levels of unemployment.

== Geography ==
=== Layout ===
Kreuzberg is bounded by the river Spree in the east. The Landwehrkanal flows through Kreuzberg from east to west, with the Paul-Lincke-Ufer street running alongside it. Other characteristics are the old U-Bahn line of the present-day U1, Görlitzer Park in the SO 36 district, and Viktoriapark on the slope of Kreuzberg hill in SW 61.

=== Subdivision ===
Kreuzberg is divided into 2 zones (Ortslagen):

1. Östliches Kreuzberg (Berlin SO 36)
2. Westliches Kreuzberg (Kreuzberg 61)

== History ==
In contrast to many other areas of Berlin, which were villages before their integration into Berlin, Kreuzberg has a rather short history. It was formed on 1 October 1920 by the Greater Berlin Act, which provided for the incorporation of suburbs and the reorganisation of Berlin into twenty boroughs. The eastern Friedrichsvorstadt, the southern Friedrichstadt, the western and southern Luisenstadt, and the Tempelhofer Vorstadt were merged into the new sixth borough of Berlin, first named Hallesches Tor. On 27 September 1921, the borough assembly of Hallesches Tor decided to rename the borough after the homonymous hill. Kreuzberg, literally meaning 'cross hill', is the point of the highest elevation in the Kreuzberg locality, which is 66 m (217 ft) above sea level. The hill is traditionally a place for weekend trips. It received its name from the 1821 Prussian National Monument for the Liberation Wars by Karl Friedrich Schinkel within the Viktoriapark, built in commemoration of the Napoleonic Wars. Except for its northernmost part—the quarter Friedrichstadt (established at the end of the 17th century)—today's Kreuzberg was a very rural place until well into the 19th century.

This changed when, in the 1860s, industrialization caused Berlin to grow rapidly. This called for extensive housing—much of which was built exploiting the dire needs of the poor, with widespread land speculation. Many of Kreuzberg's buildings originate from that time. They were built on the streets laid out in the Hobrecht-Plan in an area that came to be known architecturally as the Wilhelmine Ring.

Far into the 20th century, Kreuzberg was the most populous of Berlin's boroughs even in absolute numbers, with more than 400,000 people, although it was and still is geographically the smallest. As a result, with more than 60,000 people per square kilometer (160,000 people/mi^{2}), Kreuzberg had the highest population density in Berlin.

Kreuzberg became a district of migration during the late 19th century when Berlin began growing rapidly as an economic and cultural hub. Before World War II, it was home to a diverse population, with a large portion of the population being Ashkenazi Jews. Central to Kreuzberg Jewish life was the Fraenkelufer Synagogue, with a capacity of 2,000. This synagogue was destroyed during Kristallnacht, as were numerous Jewish businesses and property. The vast majority of Kreuzberg's Jews were deported to their deaths between 1942 and 1944 by the Nazis during The Holocaust, and their houses and businesses were seized and given to ethnic Germans. The Jewish Museum Berlin stands in Kreuzberg, and many Stolpersteine can be seen on Kreuzberg streets, commemorating the murdered Jews who lived in the area.

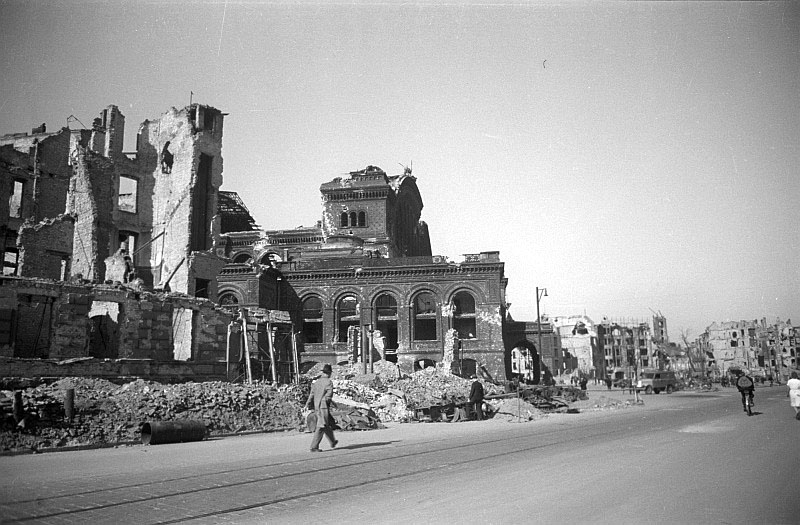
Saarlandstraße (today's Stresemannstraße) looking towards "Askanischer Platz" with the ruin of Anhalt Station and the tower stump of the "Protestant Saint Luke's Church", after the air raids during World War II

In addition to housing, Kreuzberg was also an industrial center of Berlin. The "export quarter" along Ritter Street consisted of many profitable small businesses, and the "press quarter" along Koch Street (Friedrichstadt) was the home of most of Germany's large newspapers, as well as the Ullstein, Scherl, and Mosse book publishers.

Both industrial quarters were almost entirely destroyed by air raids during World War II, with the American bombing by over a thousand aircraft on 3 February 1945. In remembrance of the old tradition, the Axel Springer press company erected its German headquarters at Kochstraße again, right next to the Berlin Wall.

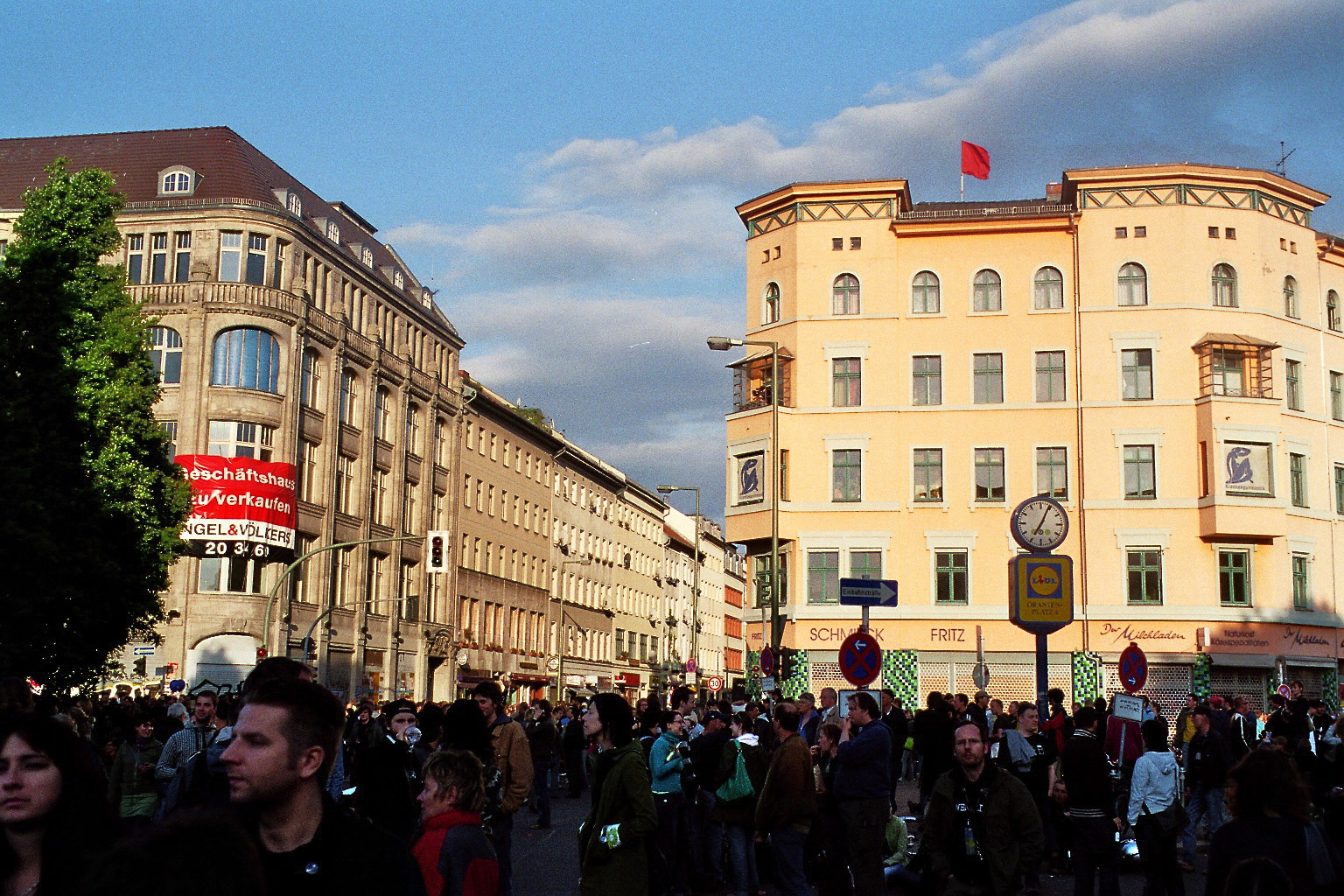
Oranienplatz on Labour Day

Kottbusser Tor (Berlin U-Bahn station)

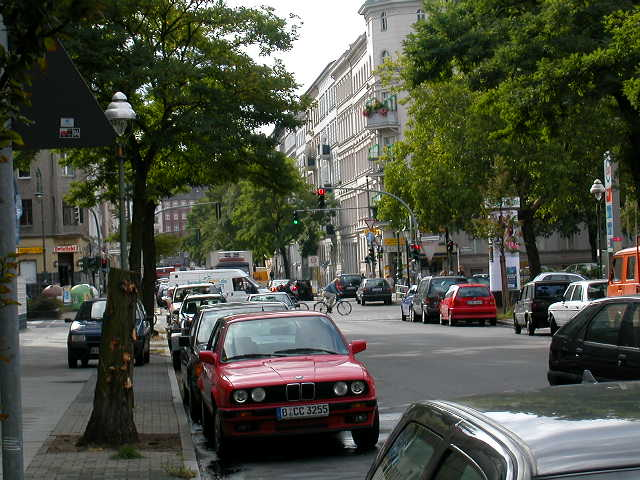
A street in Kreuzberg

In July 1945, most of the then district was assigned to the American Sector. After the Berlin Wall was built, the most important transit location to East Berlin was Checkpoint Charlie.

After World War II, Kreuzberg's housing rents were regulated by law which made investments unattractive. As a result, housing was of low quality, but cheap, which made the borough greatly attractive to immigrants. Starting in the late 1960s, increasing numbers of students, artists, and immigrants began moving to Kreuzberg. Enclosed by the Berlin Wall on three sides, the area became famous for its alternative lifestyle and its squatters, especially the SO 36 part of Kreuzberg. Starting in 1987, there have been violent riots in SO 36 on Labour day.

After the fall of the Berlin Wall, Kreuzberg suddenly found itself in the middle of the city again. The initially cheap rents and the high concentration of 19th-century housing made some parts of the borough more attractive as a residential area for a much wider (and richer) variety of people. Today, Kreuzberg has one of the youngest populations of all European city boroughs; statistically, its population has been completely swapped twice in the last two decades.

Berlin's 2001 administrative reform combined Kreuzberg with Friedrichshain to form the new borough of Friedrichshain-Kreuzberg. Since the two areas are linked only by a single bridge over the Spree River, the Oberbaumbrücke, this combination seemed awkward to many residents. The two areas not being able to agree on a common location for the future borough's city hall, the present location in Friedrichshain was decided by flipping a five-Mark coin.

== Culture ==
Kreuzberg has historically been home to Berlin's punk rock movement as well as other alternative subcultures in Germany. The SO36 club remains a fixture on the Berlin music scene. It was originally focused on punk music and in the 1970s was often frequented by Iggy Pop and David Bowie. In those days, the club rivalled New York's CBGB as one of the finest new-wave venues in the world.

However, in the 1980s Kreuzberg was perceived as the "eldorado of squatters". While in the 1990s Kreuzberg was perceived as "small Istanbul" and as an "immigrants' ghetto". Kreuzberg has also been a significant influence stemming from African-American and hip hop culture on Kreuzberg's youth and the area has become a centre for rap and breakdance within Berlin. Though the majority of Kreuzberg's residents are of German or Turkish descent, some identify more with (African-)American or other cultures. Hip hop was largely introduced to the youth of Kreuzberg by the children of American servicemen who were stationed nearby until the reunification of Germany. The art collective Berlin Kidz who are known for their pichação influenced graffiti, parkour, and train surfing are from the Kreuzberg area.

The Carnival of Cultures, a large annual festival, celebrates different cultures and heritages with colourful street parades and festivities including street entertainment, food, arts and craft stalls, music, and art.

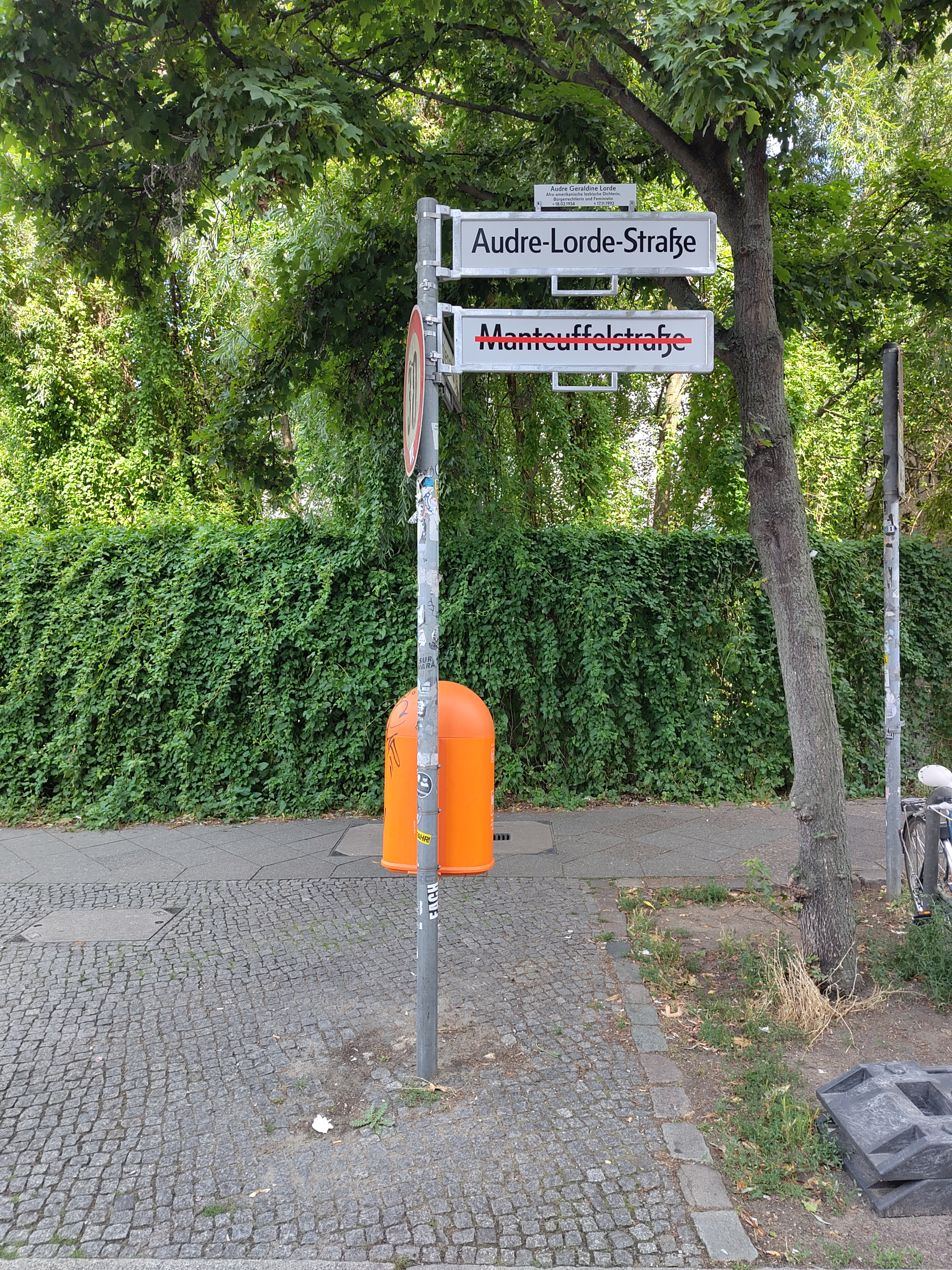
Audre-Lorde-Straße. Street-name change in Kreuzberg.

Kreuzberg has long been the epicenter of LGBTQ life and arts in Berlin. Kreuzberg is home to the Schwules Museum, established in the 1980s and dedicated to preserving, exhibiting, and discovering queer history, art, and culture.

== In popular culture ==
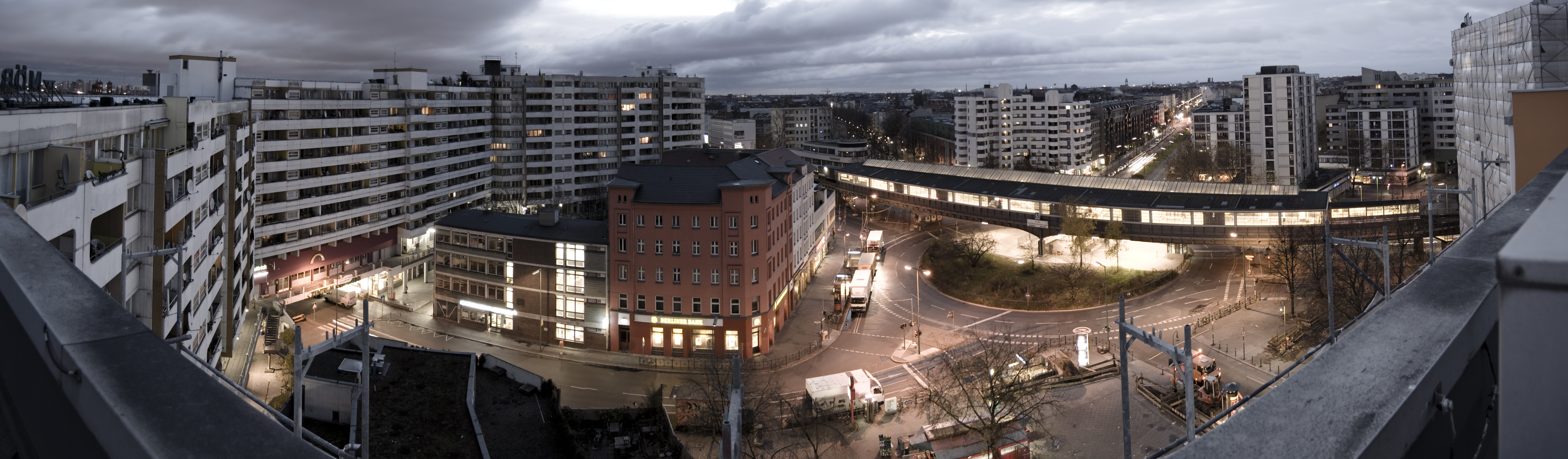
Kottbusser Tor at night

- German musician and DJ Robin Schulz's musical composition "Prayer in C", an adaptation of a prior song of the same name by Lilly Wood & the Prick, had most of the music video filmed in Friedrichshain-Kreuzberg.
- Turkish-German filmmaker Neco Celik, who portrays the American influence over the youth culture in Kreuzberg in his first film, Alltag, notes that "Kreuzberg is a kind of biotope where different nationalities live, but the environment determines their lives, not their nationalities".
- German musician Sven Regener's first novel, Berlin Blues, and third novel, Der Kleine Bruder, are set in the district of Kreuzberg.
- Kreuzberg is one of the main locations of the cult movie Possession (1981), directed by Andrzej Żuławski, starring Isabelle Adjani and Sam Neill.
- "Kreuzberg" is a song by English indie rock band Bloc Party on the album A Weekend in the City, which also mentions the East Side Gallery.
- American musician Stephen Malkmus mentions taking a "locomotive to Kreuzberg" in his song "Black Book".
- Kreuzberg's bohemian way of life is reflected in the song "Find the Time" by English singer/songwriter Sam Duckworth's band Get Cape. Wear Cape. Fly on the album Searching for the Hows and Whys.
- Kreuzberg-based Turkish-German rapper Killa Hakan mentions Kreuzberg in most of his songs, most notably in his 2007 single "Kreuzberg City".
- The acclaimed documentary Pool of Princesses (Prinzessinnenbad) by Bettina Blümner focuses on the lives of three young girls from Kreuzberg.
- Canadian musician Shotgun Jimmie's 2011 album Transistor Sister contains a song titled "The King of Kreuzberg", wherein he sings about taking the train to Kreuzberg and "jump[ing] right into it".
- English post-punk band Killing Joke have a song on their first album titled "SO 36".
- Phoenix folk-punk band Andrew Jackson Jihad make a reference to Kreuzberg in the song "Kokopelli Face Tattoo" with the lyric "Kreuz is German for Williams." Vocalist Sean Bonnette claims this pokes fun at the young hipness of Kreuzberg, in that it is similar to a German version of Williamsburg, Brooklyn.
- Kreuzberg appears in Shadowrun Returns's Dragonfall expansion as Kreuzbasar, a small self-sufficient walled community in the anarchic "F-State" of Berlin.
- In the novel No Man's Land by Michael Califra (Hadrian, 2015), the story's narrator, an American expatriate named Richard, lives in the Kreuzberg district of West Berlin in the months prior to the fall of the Wall.
- Kreuzberg-based Turkish-German rapper Massaka mentions Kreuzberg as a "ghetto" in his songs.
- In the season 3 finale of the TV series The Americans, Elizabeth and Paige Jennings travel to Kreuzberg to meet Elizabeth's mother.

== Economy ==
- Opinary, tech-media company based in Berlin-Kreuzberg

== Places and buildings of interest ==
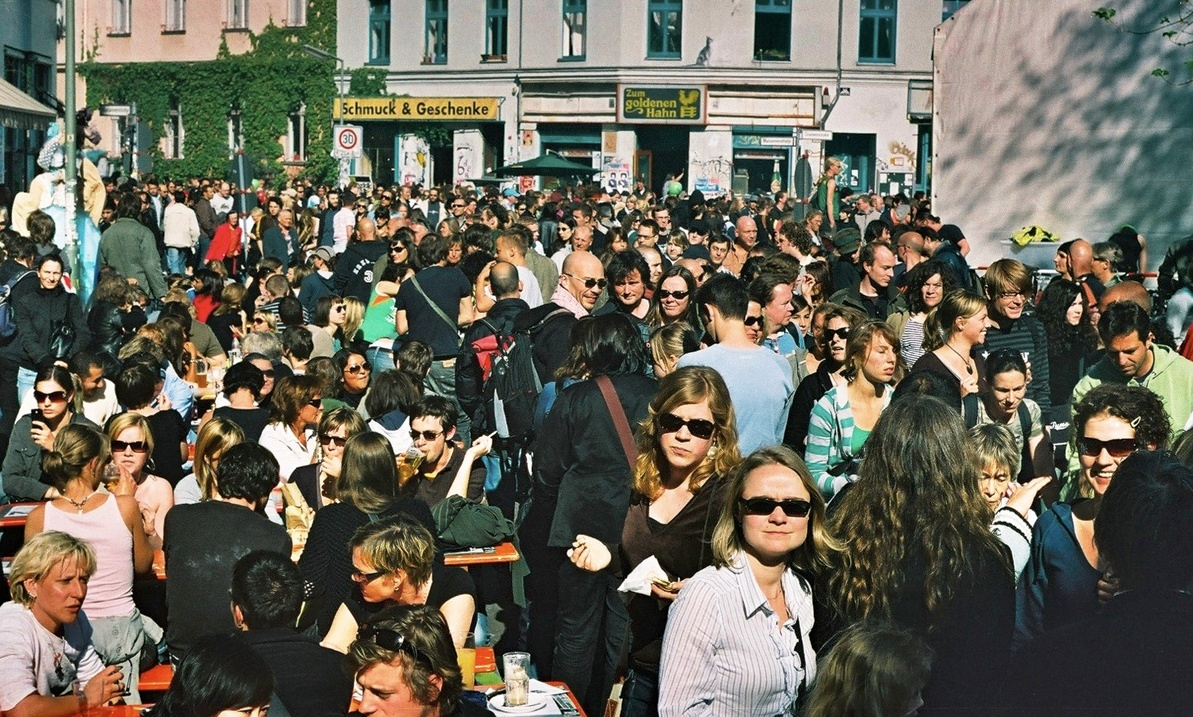
Rio-Reiser-Platz (former Heinrichplatz) in Kreuzberg

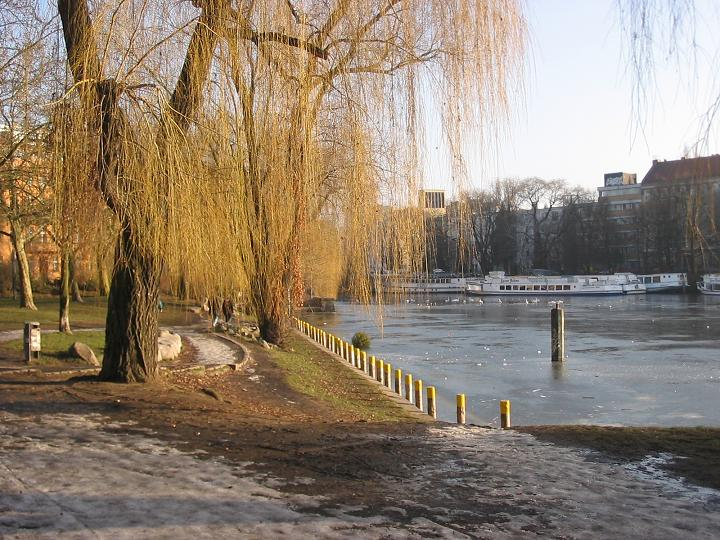
Waterside of the Landwehrkanal in Kreuzberg

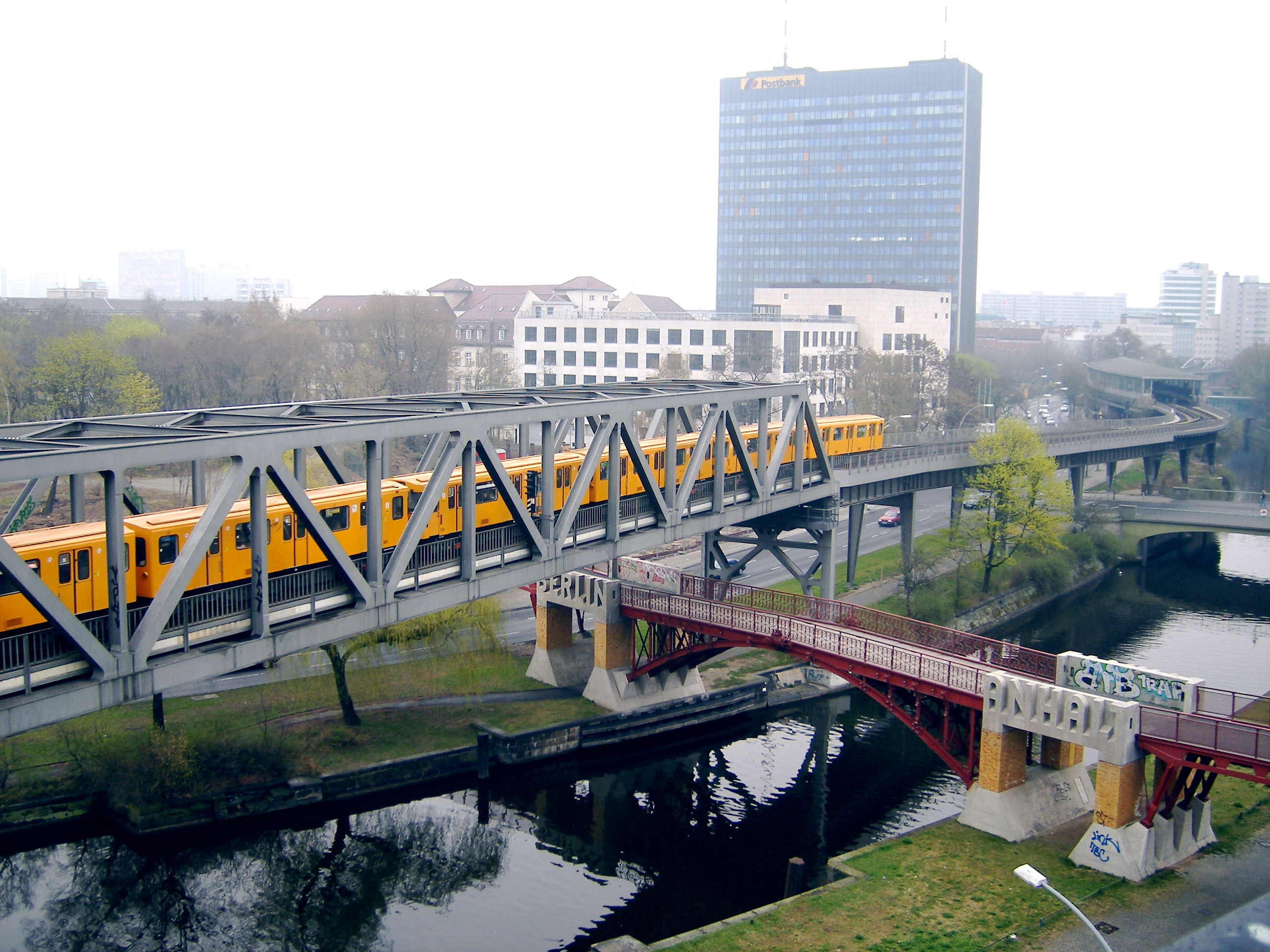
Bridges over the Landwehrkanal in Kreuzberg

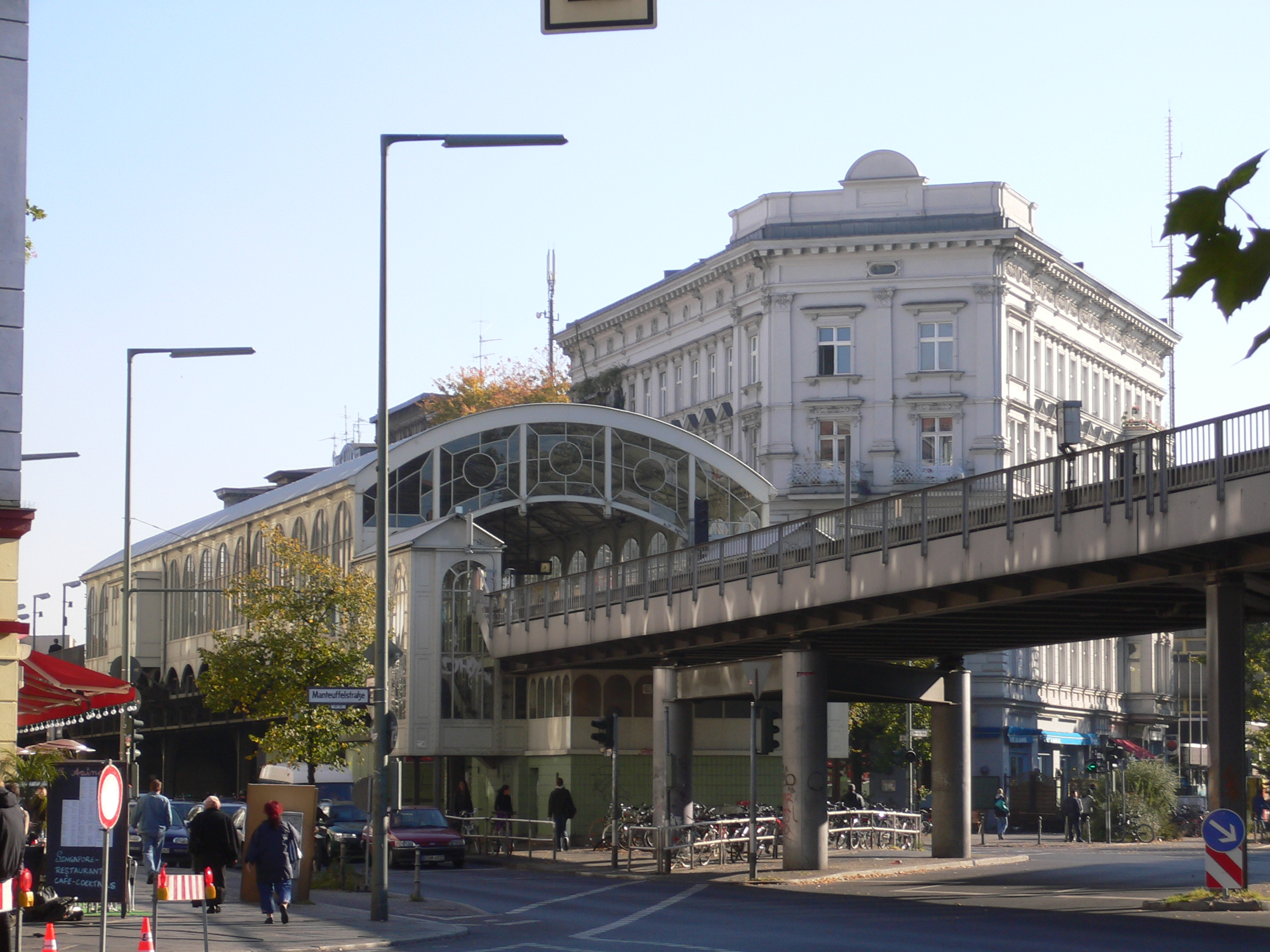
Berlin U-Bahn station Görlitzer Bahnhof

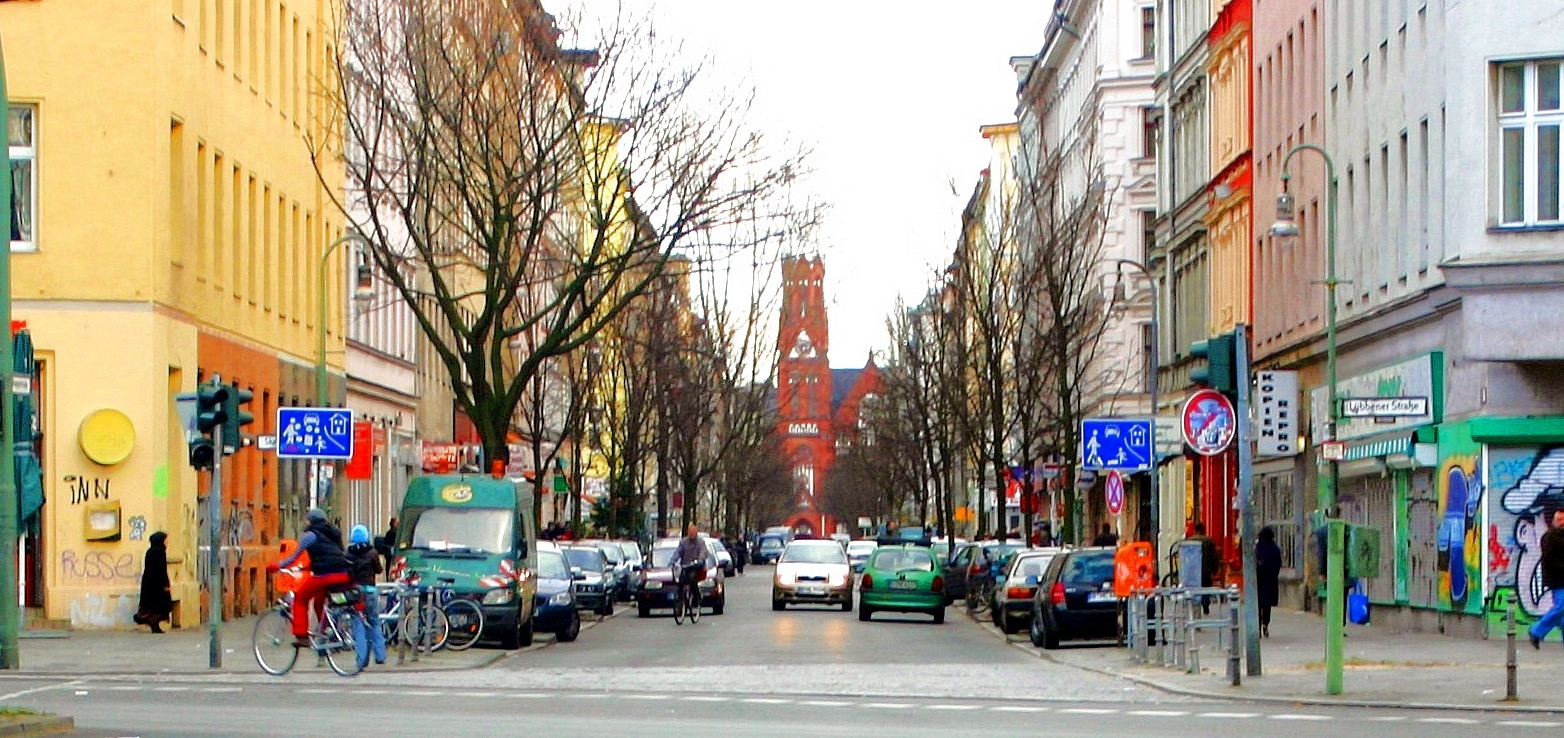
Wrangelstraße with Tabor Church

- Anhalter Bahnhof (station)
- Böckler Park
- Checkpoint Charlie
- Checkpoint Charlie Museum
- Engelbecken
- Peter Fechter Memorial, one of the first fatalities of the Berlin Wall
- Federal Ministry of Economic Cooperation and Development (Germany)
- Friedrichstraße
- German Museum of Technology (Berlin)
- Gleisdreieck (Berlin U-Bahn)
- Görlitzer Bahnhof (station)
- Hermannplatz (Berlin U-Bahn)
- Hotel Excelsior
- Jerusalem Church
- Jewish Museum Berlin
- Kochstrasse (Berlin U-Bahn)
- Kottbusser Tor (Berlin U-Bahn)
- Kreuzberg (Tempelhofer Berge)
- Landwehr Canal
- Luisenstadt Canal
- Martin-Gropius-Bau
- Mehringdamm (Berlin U-Bahn)
- Mehringplatz
- Moritzplatz (Berlin U-Bahn)
- National Monument for the Liberation Wars
- Niederkirchnerstraße
- Oberbaumbrücke (bridge over the Spree)
- Platz der Luftbrücke (Berlin U-Bahn)
- Prinzenstrasse (Berlin U-Bahn)
- Saint Thomas Church (Berlin)
- Schlesisches Tor (Berlin U-Bahn)
- Schönleinstraße (Berlin U-Bahn)
- SO36 club
- Tabor Church
- Topography of Terror
- U1 (Berlin Underground line)
- Viktoriapark
- Wilhelmstrasse

== People ==
- Arthur Arndt (1893–1974), a decorated physician of World War I who was the father and father-in-law of the largest known group of Jews to survive hiding in Germany during The Holocaust.
- Konrad Zuse (1910–1995), built the world's first programmable computer (the Z1) in 1936 in his parents' apartment in Methfesselstraße 10
- Peter Frankenfeld (1913–1979), German comedian, radio and television personality.
- Dunja Hayali (born 1974), journalist
- Paul Alfred Kleinert (born 1960), German writer, editor and translator
- Gabor Steingart (born 1962), German journalist
- Benno Fürmann (born 1972), German actor
- Pashanim (born 2000), rapper

== See also ==
- Berlin-Friedrichshain-Kreuzberg – Prenzlauer Berg East (electoral constituency)
