= Pool of Princesses =

Pool of Princesses is a German documentary film that was made in 2007. It is the English title of Prinzessinnenbad. Director Bettina Blümner accompanies three teenage girls named Klara, Mina, and Tanutscha through the district of Berlin known as Kreuzberg.

Film Information	
Original Title	Prinzessinnenbad
Original Language	German
Year of Release	2007
Length	93 Minutes
Director	Bettina Blümner

== Plot ==
Klara, Mina, and Tanutscha, all 15 years old, grew up and still live with their mothers in Berlin-Kreuzberg. They are best friends and have known each other since they were children. They share similar interests, including parties, boys, and the outdoor swimming pool. They spend much of their time at the outdoor swimming pool called "Prinzenbad" in Kreuzberg, which inspired the name of the film. The three start out inseparable, but through personal challenges, the girls begin to go their own ways. Klara has had some issues with the law and has been involved with men much too old for her. Mina begins to spend more time with her boyfriend and less time doing other things in her life and Tanutscha struggles with stricter parents than the other two, and having more freedom is a primary concern of hers.

== Awards ==
- At the Berlinale 2007, the film received the Dialogue en Perspective awards for the work of Bettina Blümner
- At the German Filmpreises 2008, the film received the award of being the best documentary film.
