= Görlitzer Park =

Public park in Berlin, Germany

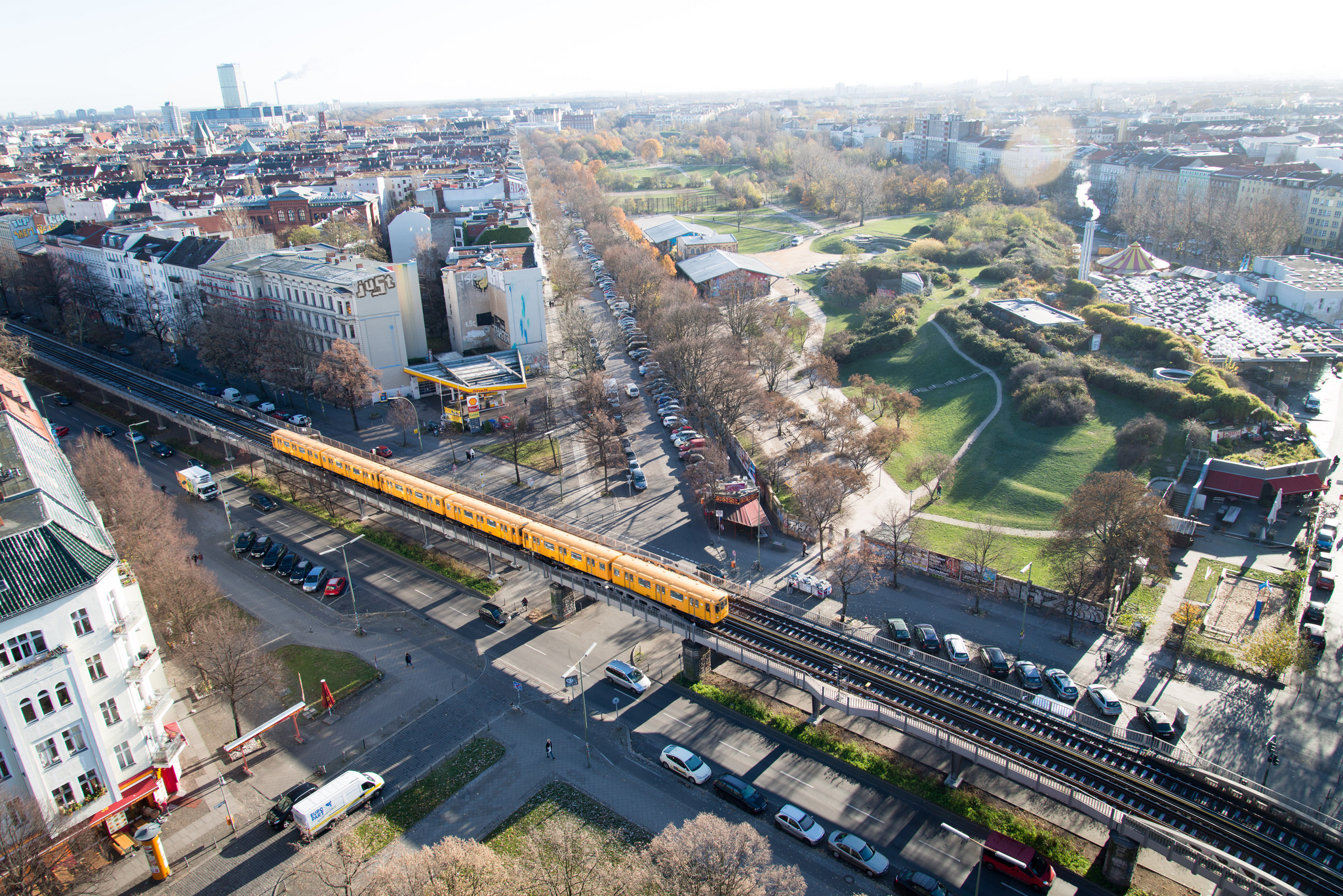
- Bird's-eye view of the park

- Location within Berlin Location within Germany
- Type: Urban park
- Location: Kreuzberg, Berlin
- Coordinates: 52°29′47″N 13°26′16″E
- Area: 14 hectares (35 acres)
- Created: 1980s
- Status: Open year-round

Görlitzer Park (nicknamed "Görli") is a major park and recreation area in the Kreuzberg district of Berlin. The 14-hectare park area contains, among other things, a petting zoo, several sports and football fields, and a small lake. At its north-west end is the Görlitzer Bahnhof U-Bahn station.

== History ==
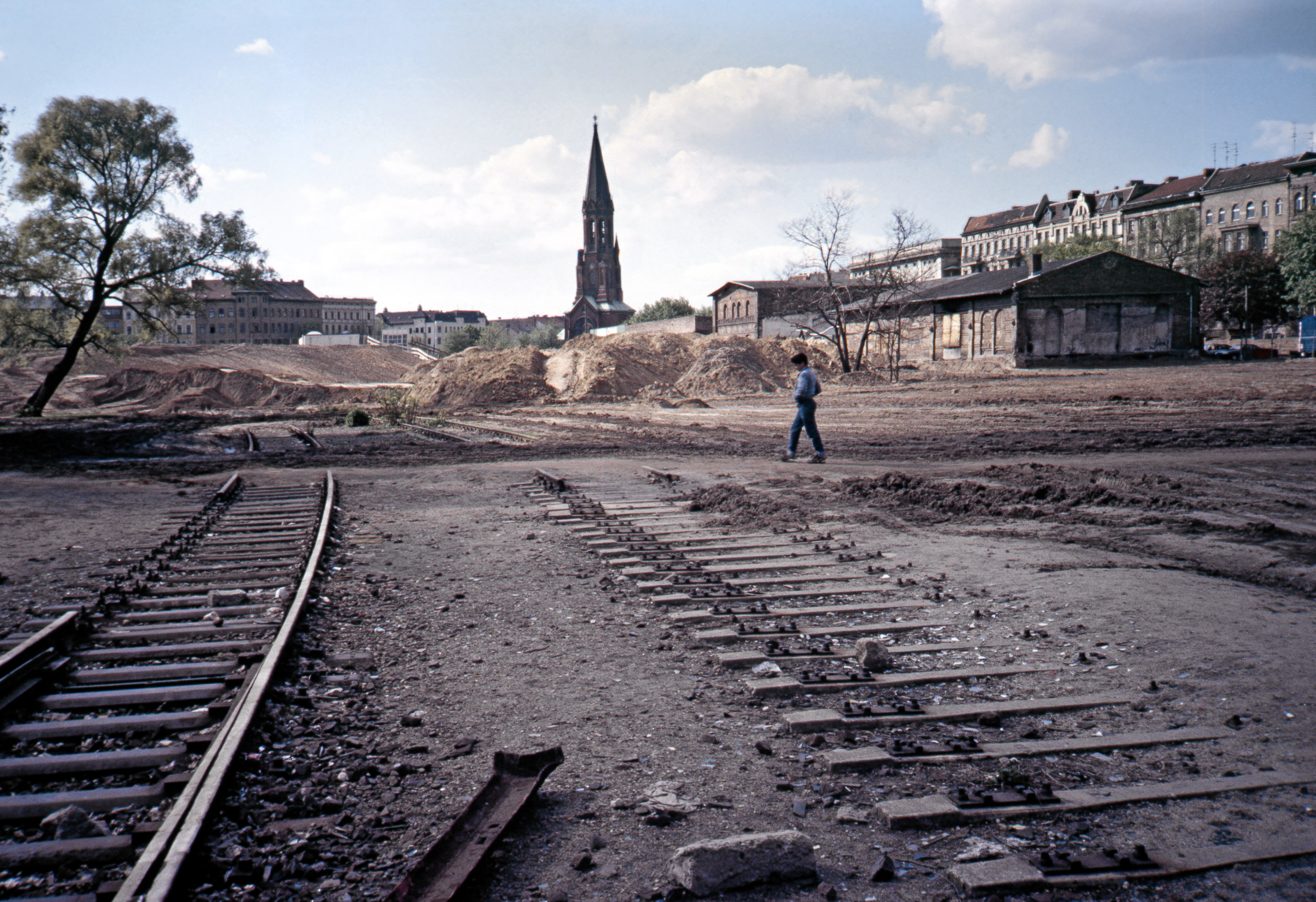
The last train track, May 1987

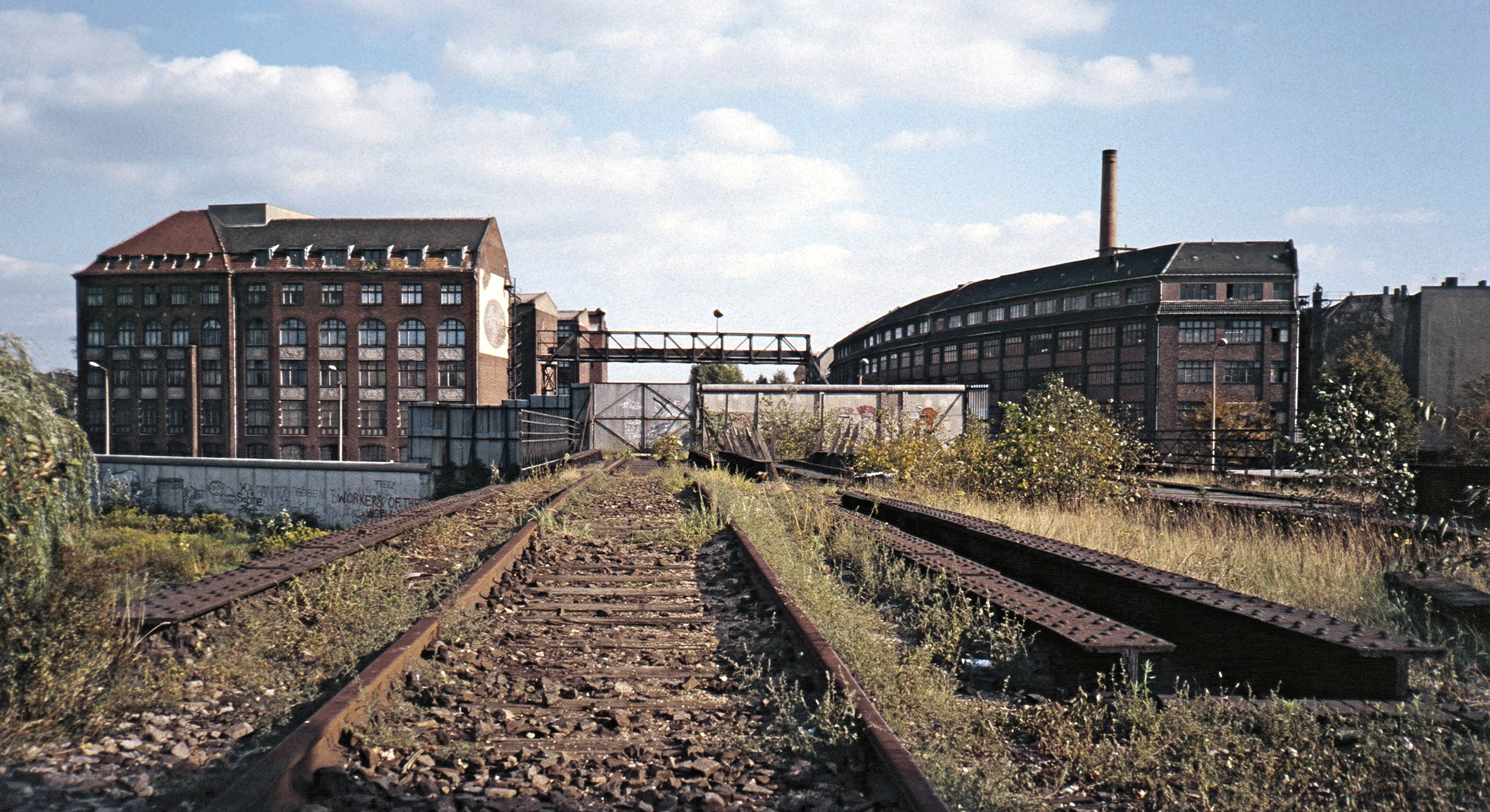
Former freight train gate and GDR border checkpoint.

The original Görlitzer Bahnhof (named after the Saxon town of Görlitz) suffered heavy damage during the Battle of Berlin. The last passenger train services to operate through the station ended on April 29, 1951. Demolition of the site took place on 24 October 1962, at the behest of former Berlin Senator, Rolf Schwedler (SPD), despite protests by many residents.

In the postwar period, the site was used as a coal depot. Until 1985, freight trains still operated through the Görlitzer Bahnhof train lines, supplying nearby storage sheds and a junkyard on the station grounds. During the division of Berlin, a border crossing was erected on the bridge over the Landwehr canal to control the passage of these freight trains. The remains of this border crossing are still visible today, as are a short piece of track to the east of the canal bridge and two former freight sheds still remain from the former station.

Görlitzer Park is widely known as a hotspot for purchasing cannabis.

=== Park conception ===
In the early 1980s, a civil and squatter movement began pushing for the creation of a "Görlitzer City Park" on the site of the old Bahnhof. In the spring of 1983, a program of "greening" of the area was scheduled:

"The northern part of the area, from Görlitzer Ufer along Görlitzer Straße to the Fatih Mosque, could at least provisionally be greened. ‘For the development of vegetation, a design hasn't been agreed upon. [...] That's why the citizens do not need to get involved.' (Parks Department) "

— - Südost Express: Wunder dauern etwas länger (Miracles take a little longer), 7-8 / 1982

At this time, the soil at the site of a former scrap metal compactor was heavily contaminated with oil and needed to be replaced, and an area of the future park was still being used as a coal depot. However, the Reichsbahn management proved to be supportive of the park plans and "Cheerfully developed a children's petting zoo on the southern track. Material and feed donations from surrounding industries flowed in abundantly, and bulldozers from a local cement plant came by occasionally to donate topsoil. Only the money to lease the land was still lacking.

Final approval from the Environment and Finance Senators was still pending at that time.

=== Children's playground ===
According to the Südost Express, "the district office of Kreuzberg had already rented the 4000 square meter site," by 1979, as part of the initiative by Verein SO 36, a local civic group. However, the building authorities wanted to use the site to construct a Spreewald-Bad swimming pool complex. "More than 1000 signatures have been collected so far for this playground. [...] (After negotiations) the district office will seek to find a solution that makes both the building project and a children's playground possible on the Görlitzer Bahnhof site."

=== The park today ===
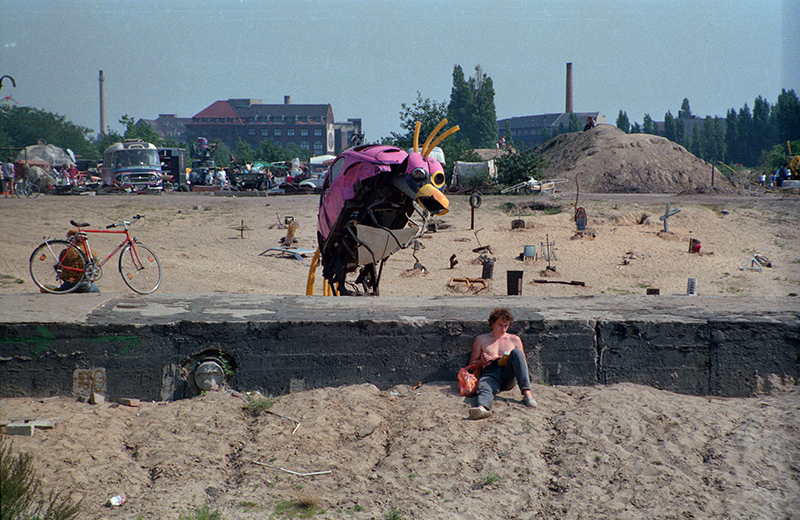
The crater before the demolition of the pedestrian tunnel, 1989

At the end of the 1980s, a district park was built on the former railway site to the plans of the Freie Planungsgruppe Berlin. Today, only remnants of tracks, the pedestrian tunnel, the former enclosure wall, and three freight sheds exist of the former station.

In the south of the present park, several railway bridges connected the station area with the district of Treptow, one of which is still preserved, that leads pedestrians over the Landwehr Canal. A green corridor on the former railway line runs parallel to Kiefholzstraße and deep into Alt-Treptow so that cyclists and pedestrians can access Treptower Park through Görlitzer Park. Until the fall of the Wall, the Berlin Wall ran along the Landwehr Canal. Also, in the southern part of the area, in the corner formed by Görlitzer Ufer and Wiener Straße, a railroad wheelhouse used to exist. Today, there is a hill with a slide and an 80-metre (260 ft) toboggan run. The park borders Wrangelkiez on the north/northeastern side.

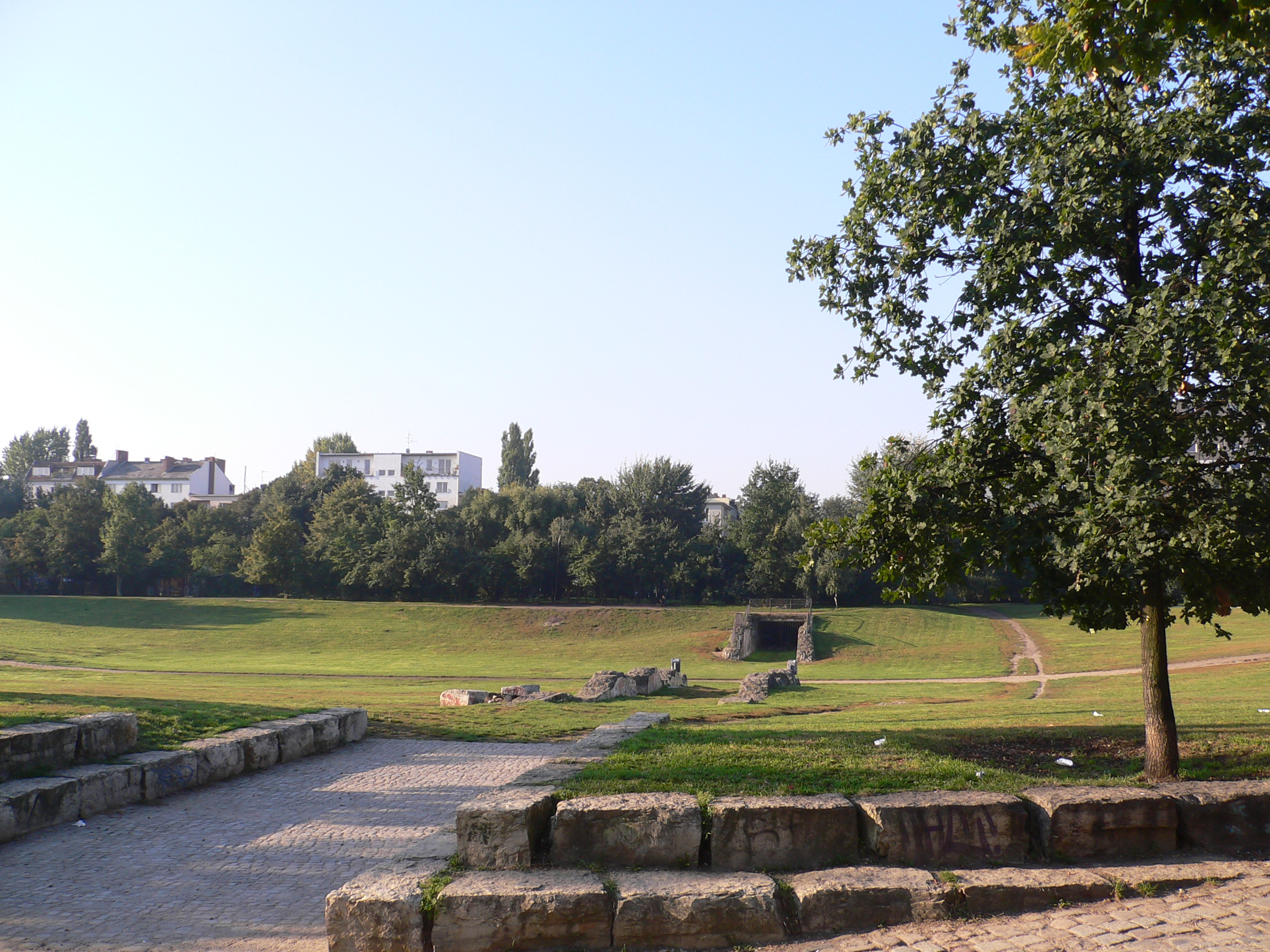
Remains of the pedestrian tunnel in Görlitzer Park

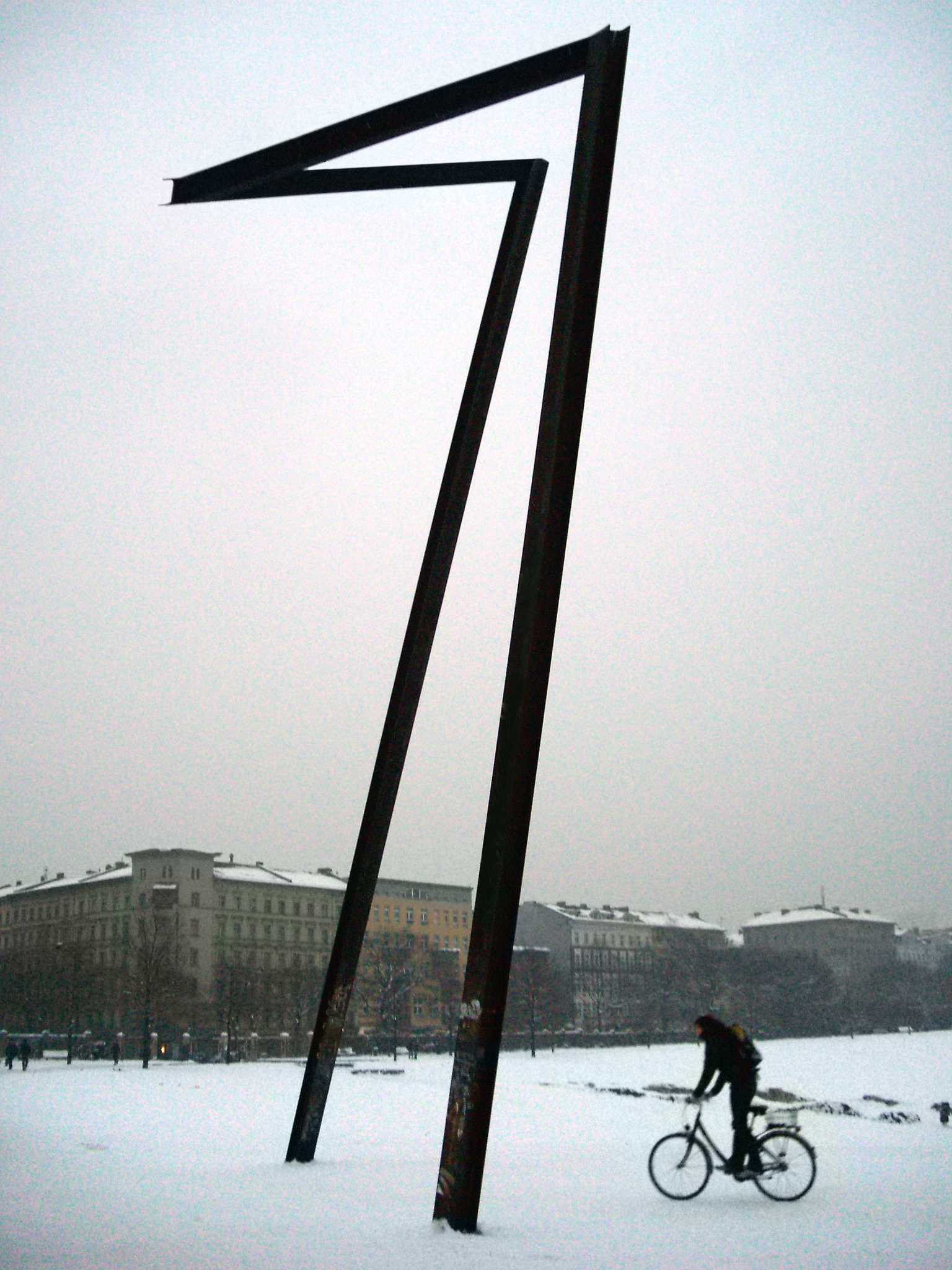
The sculpture ‘Schreitender Mensch’ by Rüdiger Preisler

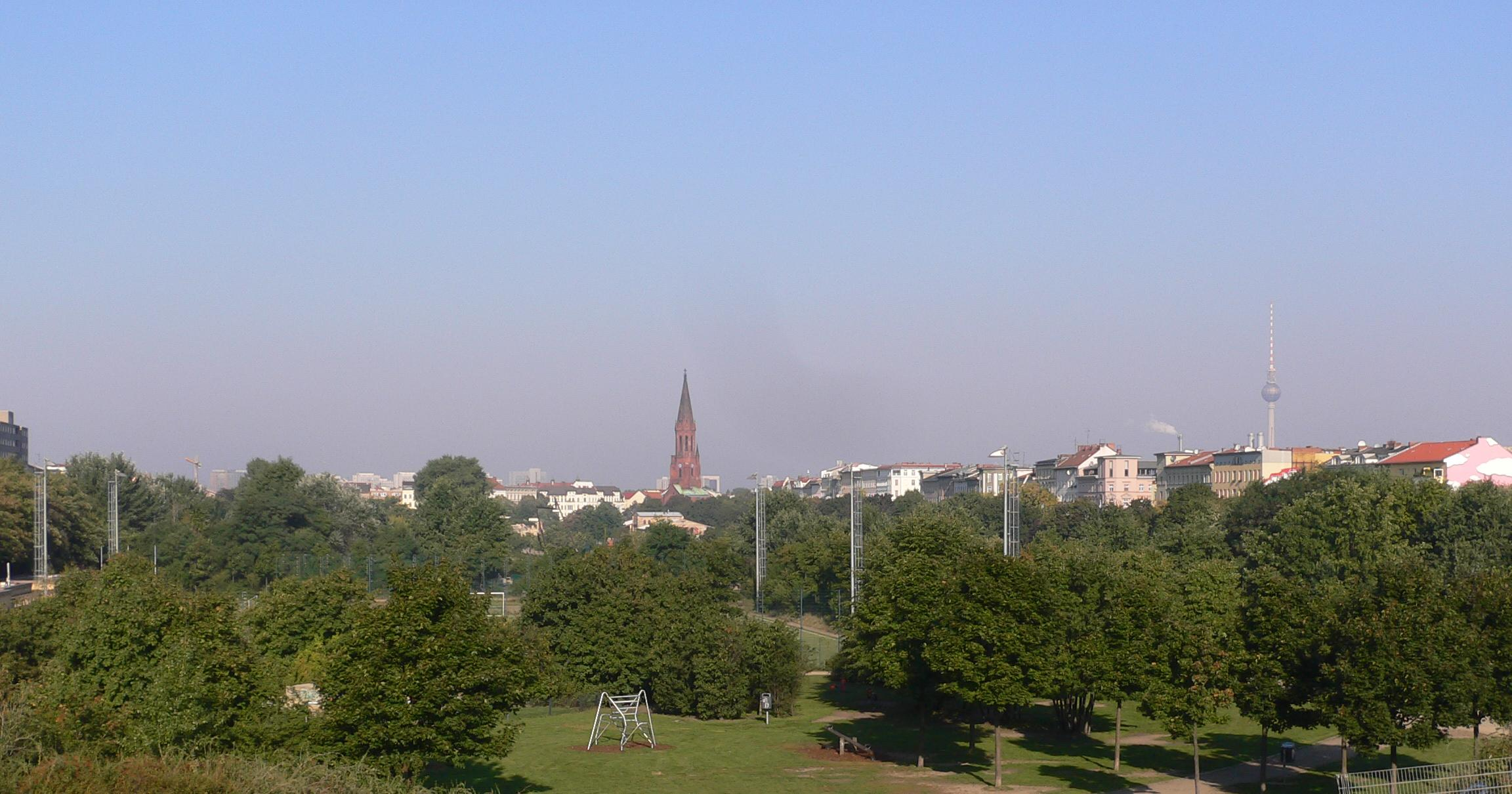
Görlitzer Park as seen from Rodelberg hill, the Emmaus Church and the TV tower visible in the distance

The Görlitzer Tunnel was still walkable until at least the end of 1989, the removal of which gave the park a large hollow in the middle, which forms a kind of natural arena. The former walls of the tunnel were included as a design element and are still recognizable today. On the west side of the basin is a 14-metre (46 ft) steel-beam sculpture, Schreitender Mensch, by Rüdiger Preisler.

=== Location ===
The park is bounded to the northwest by Spreewaldplatz, the former station forecourt which now houses the Wellenbad am Spreewaldplatz swimming pool complex. The swimming pool complex was built between 1984 and 1987 according to plans by architect Christoph Langhof. In the north, Lausitzer Platz flanks the area with the Emmaus Church, which was built between 1890 and 1893 according to plans by August Orth. They are separated from the park by the viaduct of the Berlin U-Bahn lines U1 & U3 along Skalitzer Straße. In the south, the area borders the Landwehr Canal and the district of Alt-Treptow.

=== Former Pamukkale Fountain and plans for redesigning the park ===
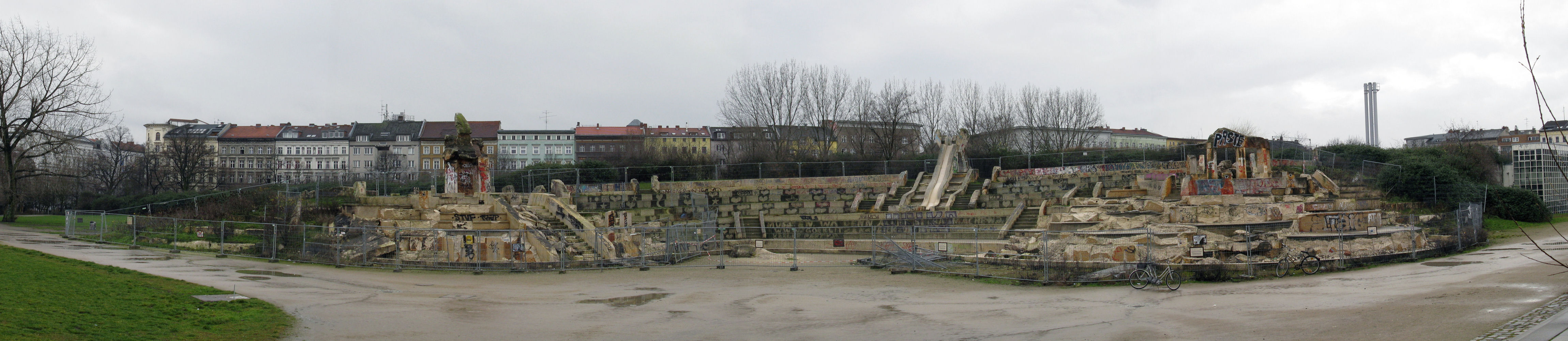
Panorama of the crumbled Pamukkale fountain, winter 2008

The Pamukkale fountain, created by the sculptor Wigand Witting between 1994 and 1997 and completed in 1998, was a central design element of the park. Inspired by the travertine terraces of Pamukkale, Turkey, it served as a significant cultural landmark for Kreuzberg's residents of Turkish descent. Due to structural defects, including a faulty substructure and unsuitable Portuguese limestone, the fountain suffered severe winter damage shortly after completion and was closed for safety reasons. This led to a decade-long legal dispute over restoration costs. In 2000, the artist was ordered to pay 1.1 million euros in damages, a verdict upheld in November 2008. In autumn 2009, the fountain was demolished amid local protests. During the removal, activists poured red paint over the structure as a symbolic protest against the loss of a work representing integration and cultural diversity.

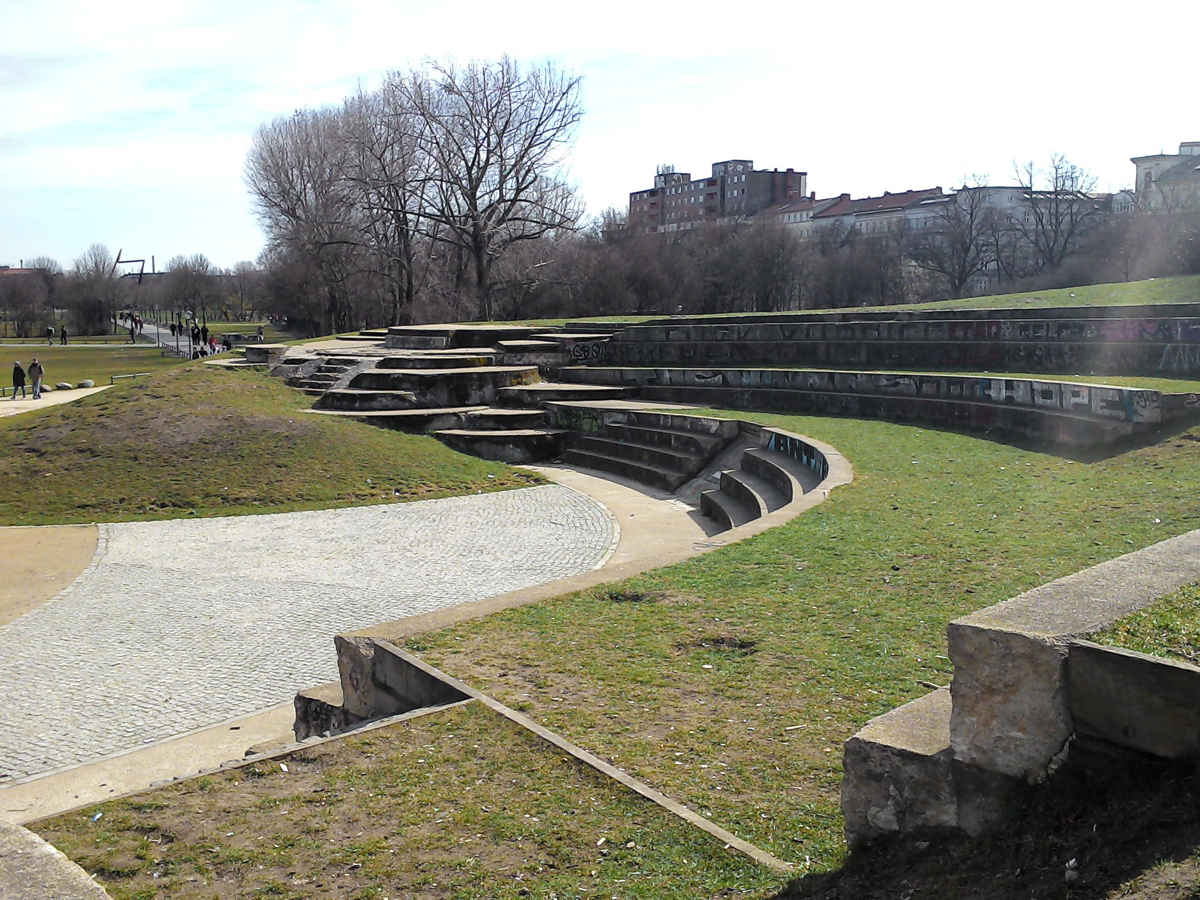
The site today is reminiscent of an amphitheater design.

The remaining concrete terraces were laid out with artificial turf and now are used for seating.

After the demolition of the fountain and the dissatisfaction of many park visitors with the condition of the park, the district office of Friedrichshain-Kreuzberg organized an "ideas workshop" in 2009 to beautify the park.

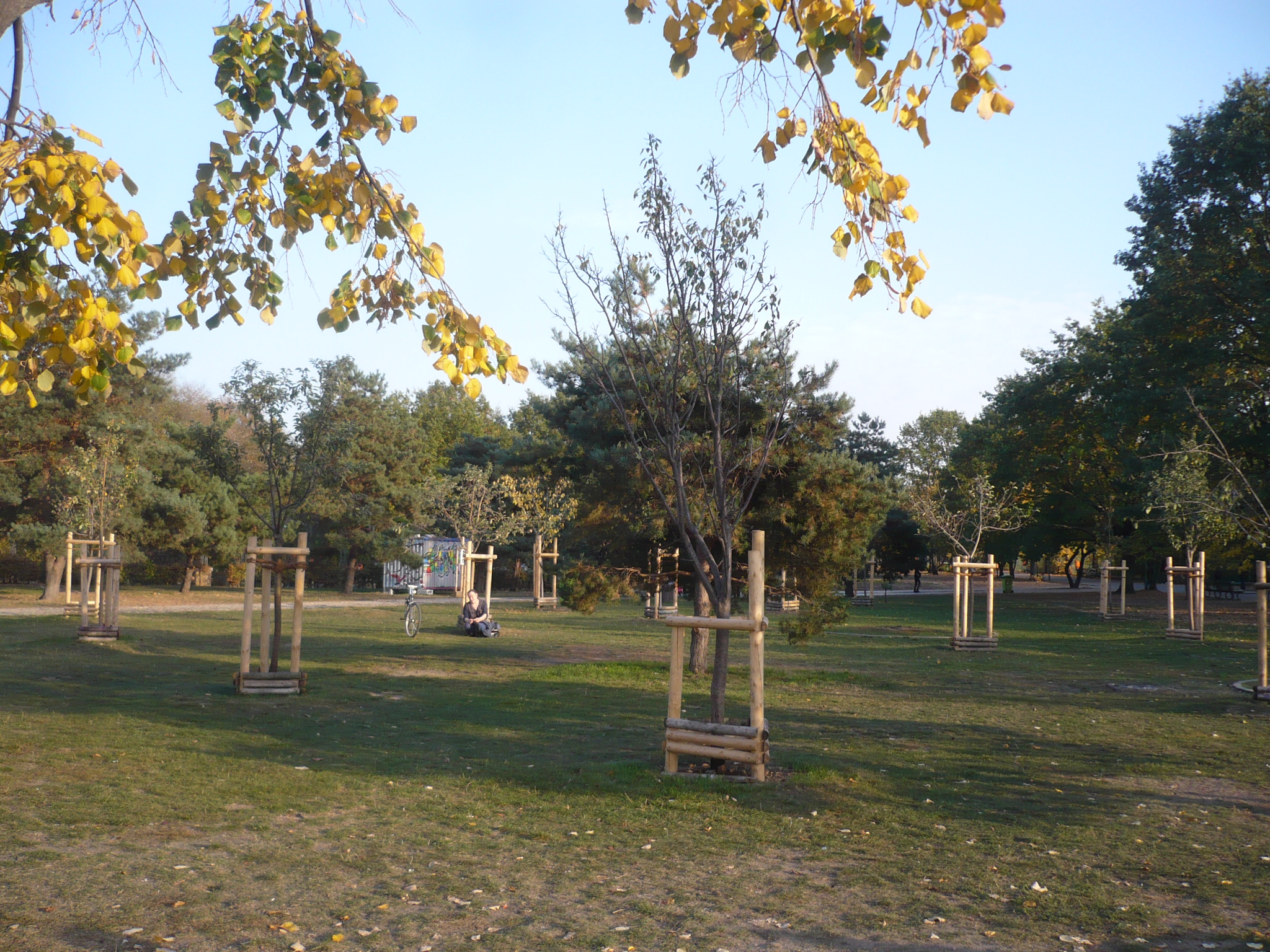
The orchard

=== The orchard ===
Since 2011, in the middle of the park, an orchard with apple, pear and greengage trees was created. In total, there were 26 trees after the third planting in early April 2013. As a memorial to deceased Kreuzberg actor Eralp Uzun, family and friends planted another tree in the meadow in May 2013.

This orchard was created by the Kiezwandlern, a local Transition Town group, with the support of the district's green area office. Committed residents habitually cultivate the orchard meadow. The later harvest from the trees is available to the public.

== Drug trafficking ==
Görlitzer Park is one of the largest drug transfer centers in Berlin. The park has been the site of multiple violent incidents resulting in injuries. The drug dealing originated in parts of the park during the 2000s. Since May 2012, the park area has been subject to constant police patrols. The problems, however, have remained.

In November 2014, the "Task Force Görlitzer Park" was established to curb drug-related crime around Görlitzer Park. This task force consisted of the Berlin Police, the public prosecutor's office, the administration of justice, the immigration office, and the Friedrichshain-Kreuzberg district office. The task force effected several changes to Görlitzer Park, such as removing hedges and shrubs that could serve as drug stashes, as well as greatly increasing the police presence.

Interior Senator Frank Henkel introduced a zero tolerance rule in March 2015 which enabled the police to prosecute consumers and dealers for small amounts of drugs. However, this did not eliminate the drug problem, instead causing many drug dealers to move to other streets, parks and neighborhoods. On October 16, 2017, the Red-Red-Green Coalition rescinded the rule, and the purchase, transportation, and consumption of up to 15 grams (1/2 oz) of cannabis in Görlitzer Park has resumed with relative impunity.

At a security summit in September 2023, Berlin mayor Kai Wegner announced that a fence would be built around the park so that it could be locked at night. In addition to fencing in areas where there is no wall, the entrances would be equipped with iron gates and turnstiles and floodlights installed in the park. The Berlin Senate initially estimated costs of 1.9 million euros for the fence construction and 1.2 million for the lighting. In addition, 800,000 euros per year are expected to be required for security and maintenance. The district of Friedrichshain-Kreuzberg, along with numerous initiatives led by residents and environmental groups, criticized this plan. They argued that building a fence would not solve any of the problems, but would merely shift drug dealing and use to the surrounding neighborhoods. Instead, they called for “social solutions” such as drug consumption rooms, affordable housing, and work permits for asylum seekers. Numerous protests criticizing the mayor's “law and order” politics as being purely symbolic, culminated in various acts of civil disobedience and a lawsuit filed by residents against the Berlin Senate.

Between March and May 2026, Görlitzer Park was closed at 10 p.m. On June 1, 2026, an administrative court ruled in summary proceedings that the nighttime closure of the park was invalid for the time being. Until a final judgment is rendered in the main proceedings, the park will remain open at night. Following the decision, the fence and gates remained in place, but the gates were kept open. The Senate announced that it would appeal the summary ruling.
