= Landwehr Canal =

Canal in Berlin, Germany

Coordinates: 52°29′52″N 13°23′33″E

Landwehr Canal (Landwehrkanal)
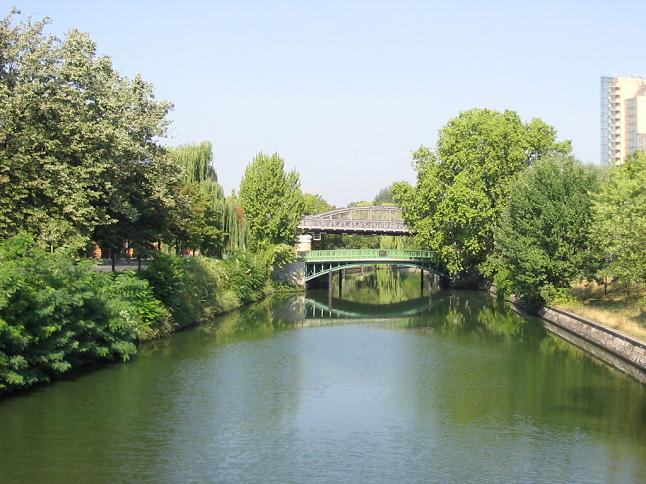
- View along the Landwehr Canal to the Köthener Brücke and the bridge for U2
- Interactive map of Landwehr Canal (Landwehrkanal)

Specifications
- Length: 10.7 km (6.6 miles)

History
- Construction began: 1845
- Date completed: 1850

Geography
- Start point: Osthafen (Berlin)
- End point: Charlottenburg

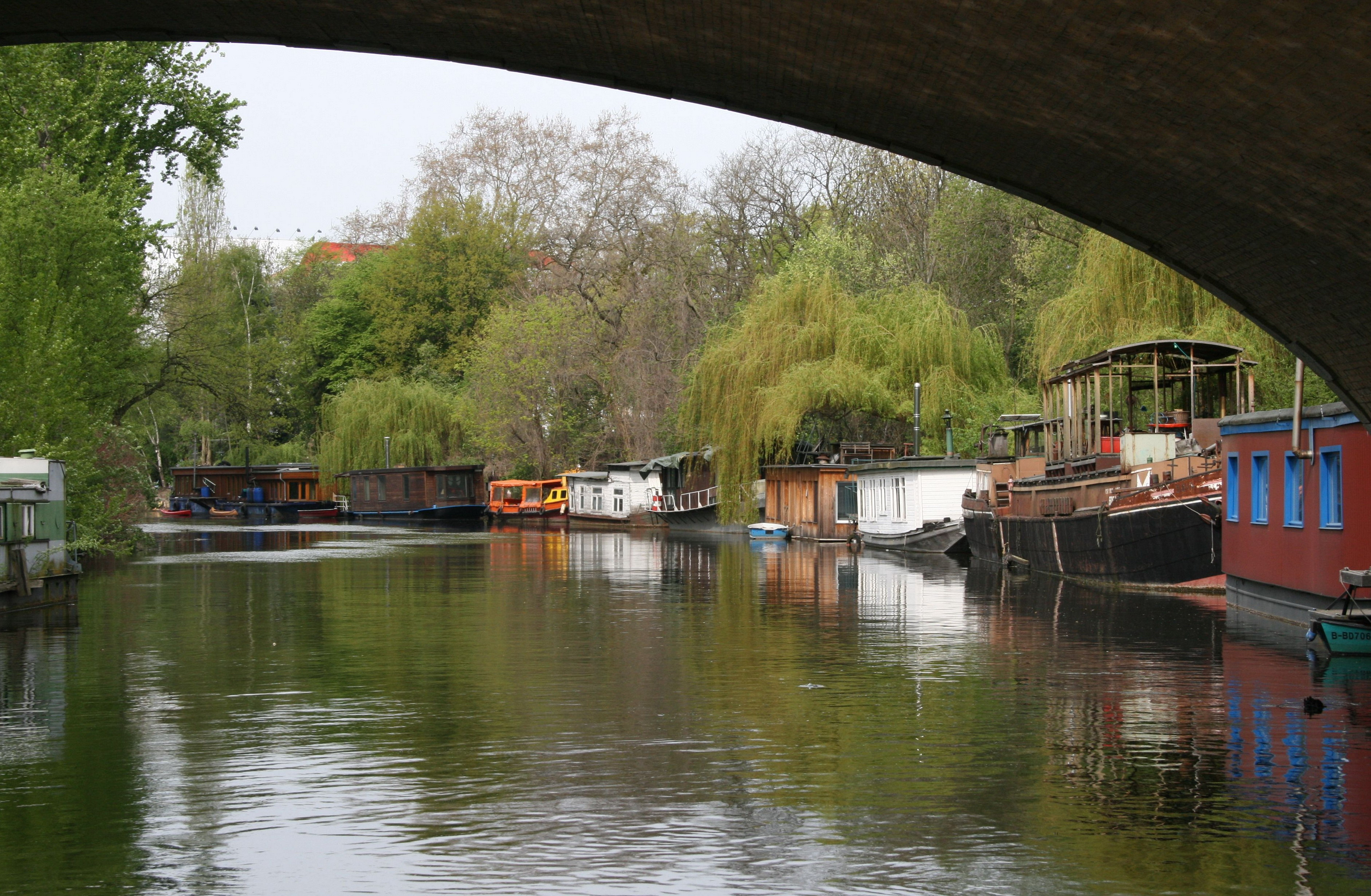
Houseboats on the Landwehr Canal in the Tiergarten

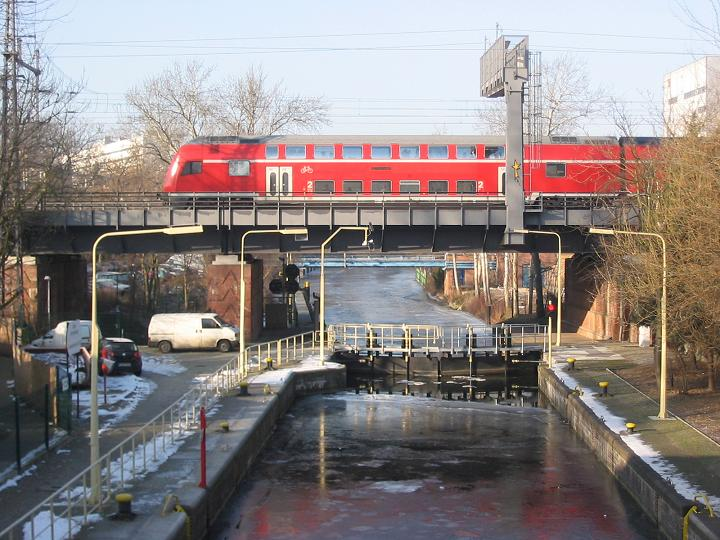
Lower lock and Stadtbahn bridge

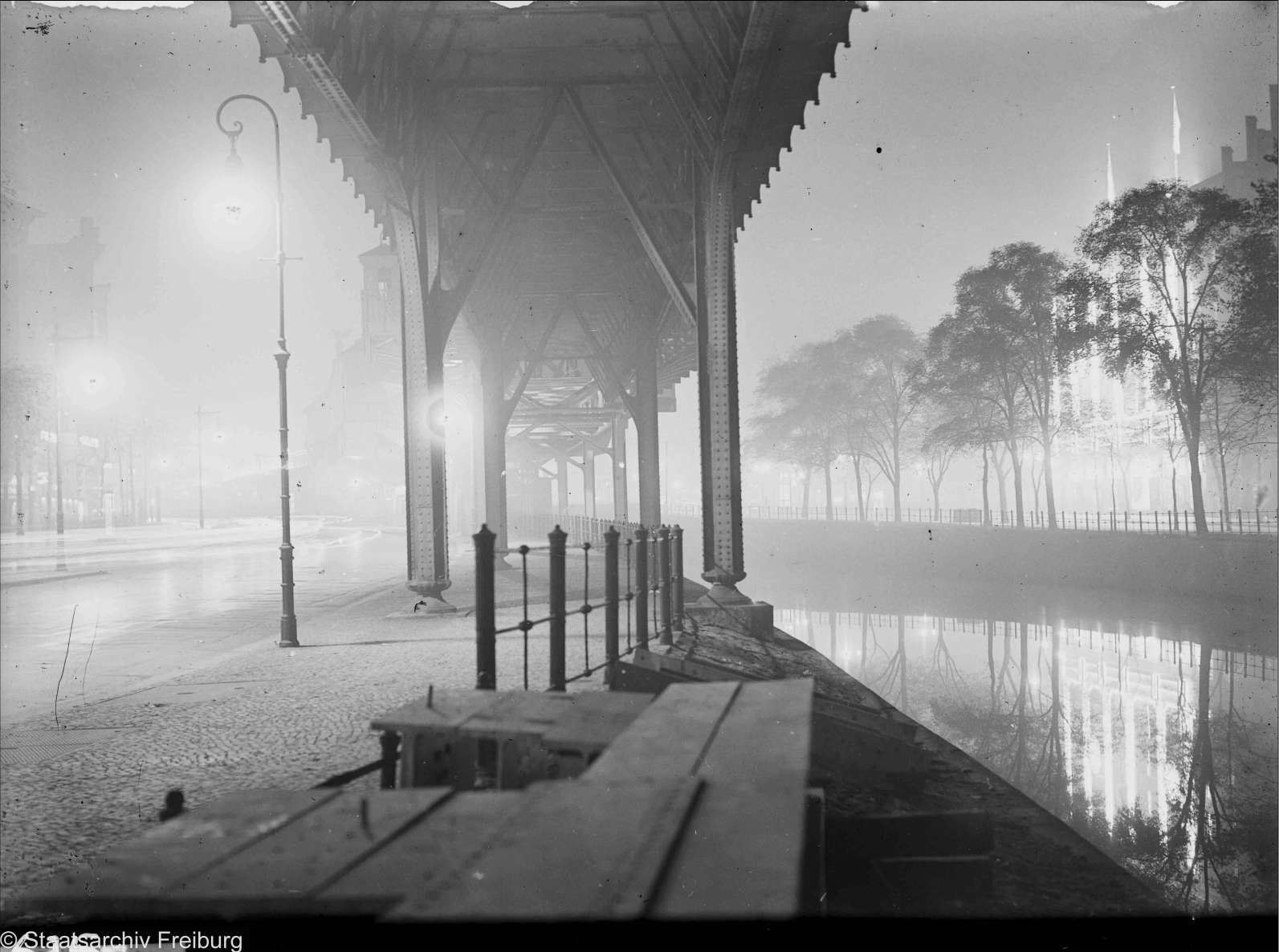
Pictured in 1928, near to the site of the 1945 breach

The Landwehr Canal (German: Landwehrkanal), is a 10.7-kilometre-long (6.6 mi) canal parallel to the Spree river in Berlin, Germany, built between 1845 and 1850 to plans by Peter Joseph Lenné. It connects the upper part of the Spree at the eastern harbour (Osthafen) in Friedrichshain with its lower part in Charlottenburg, flowing through Kreuzberg and Tiergarten.

== History ==
Lenné designed a canal with sloped walls, an average width of 20 m (66 ft) at the surface and locks near both ends to control the water depth. In the course of two enlargements (1883–1890 and 1936–1941), it reached a breadth of 22 m (72 ft) and a depth of 2 m (6.6 ft). Today the waterway is mainly used by tourist boats and pleasure craft.

== About ==
The Landwehr Canal leaves the Spree River in the eastern harbour in Friedrichshain, east of the city centre. It immediately descends through the upper lock (Schleusenufer) and heads in a straight line south west to its junction with the Neukölln Ship Canal, which provides a connection to the Teltow Canal. Here the Landwehr Canal turns north west through Kreuzberg, along the Paul-Lincke-Ufer.

In Kreuzberg the canal passes the entrance to the former Luisenstadt Canal that, between 1852 and 1926, provided a further connection to the Spree River. Although this has since been filled and partially converted to a public garden, its route can still be traced by the parallel flanking streets with their distinctive damm suffixes.

Further west in Kreuzberg, the canal is paralleled for about 1 kilometre (0.62 mi) by the U1 line of the Berlin U-Bahn, which runs here as an elevated railway. After passing the elevated Möckernbrücke and Hallesches Tor stations, the U1 crosses the canal on a high level bridge that also spans the railway bridge that once gave access to the, now demolished, Anhalter Bahnhof. Shortly after that, the elevated U2 line crosses the canal.

After entering Tiergarten, the canal flows between the Großer Tiergarten Park and the Berlin Zoological Garden. Here the canal passes through the lower lock (Unterschleuse) and is bridged by the Berlin Stadtbahn. This historic elevated railway carries S-Bahn, Regional-Express and InterCity trains. The Landwehr Canal rejoins the Spree River in Charlottenburg, immediately opposite the entrance to the Charlottenburg Canal at a waterways crossroad known as Spreekreuz.

== Events ==
After Rosa Luxemburg was executed on 15 January 1919, her body was dumped into the Landwehr Canal, where it was not found until 1 June 1919. A memorial marks the site. In 1920, Anna "Anastasia" Anderson (Franziska Schanzkowska) attempted suicide by jumping into the water. In 1932, the initial construction of the Shell-Haus overlooking the canal was completed.

On 27 April 1945, the Red Army was closing in on the German Army's final defensive stronghold in the Tiergarten district of Berlin. As some Soviet troops were using the U-bahn tunnels for their advance, German military engineers, apparently acting on Hitler's direct orders, blew up retaining walls by a railway tunnel adjoining the canal, drowning many civilians and evacuated army casualties (in hospital trains) who were given refuge in the tunnels.

On 8 June 1962, a party of fourteen East German refugees commandeered the river steamer Friedrich Wolff, erected steel plates around the wheelhouse and sailed from the Spree into the Landwehr Canal. An East German patrol boat intercepted them and opened fire, but West German police returned fire and all landed safely on the canal bank, in the West.
