= Berlin Customs Wall =

Ring wall in Berlin (1737–1860)

Coordinates: 52.528468°N 13.379933°E

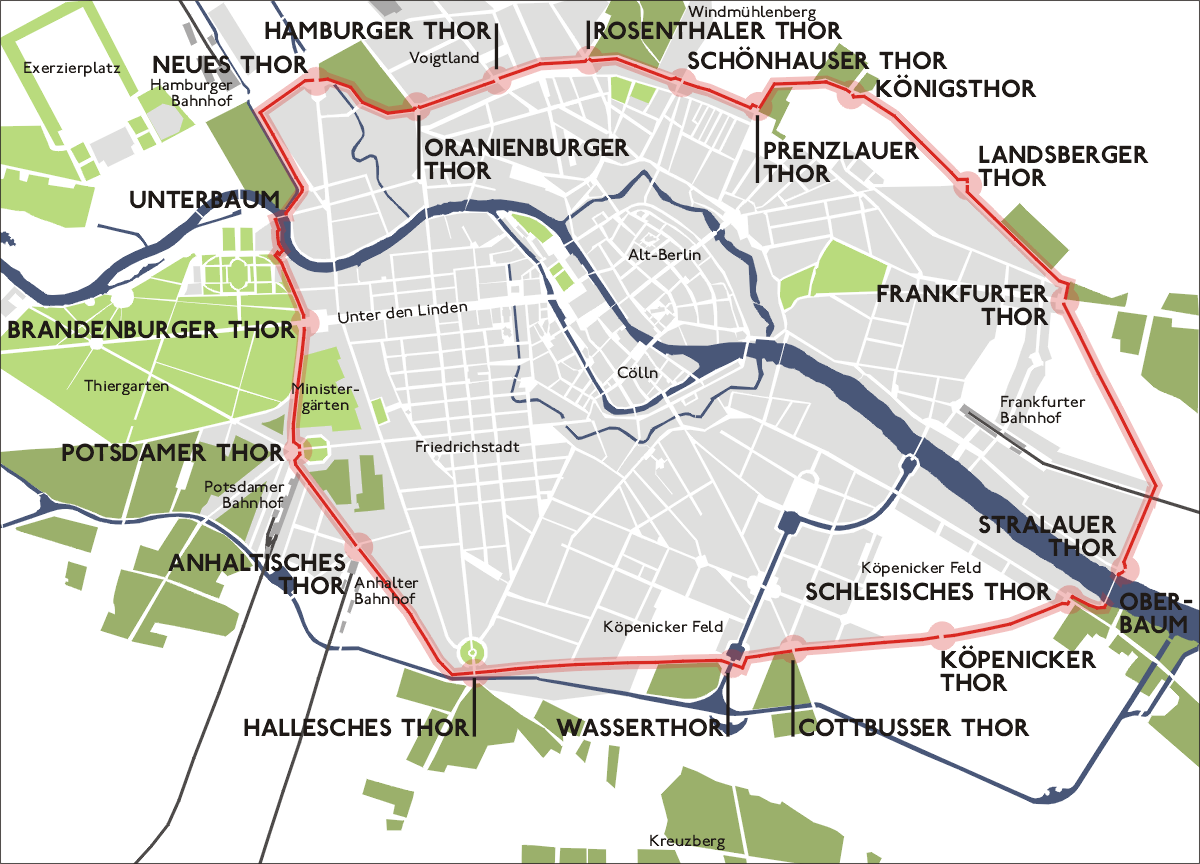
Berlin Customs Wall around 1855

The Berlin Customs Wall (German: "Berliner Zoll- und Akzisemauer", literally Berlin customs and excise wall) was a ring wall around the historic city of Berlin, between 1737 and 1860; the wall itself had no defence function but was used to facilitate the levying of taxes on the import and export of goods (tariffs), which was the primary income of many cities at the time.

== History ==
The wall was erected after the old Berlin Fortress was demolished in 1734; the walls of the latter had already started to crumble and its military function was questionable. Frederick William I of Prussia ordered the construction of stockades around the city which were completed in 1737 – the new ring fence incorporated the existing northern "palisade line" built in 1705. The location of this oldest stockade is recalled today by the street name "Linienstraße" (line street). Few parts of this original customs wall were stone-built.

The original customs wall had 14 city gates which were mostly named after the city to which the ensuing road led. Additionally, the river Spree was blocked with customs gates called "Oberbaum" (upper boom) and "Unterbaum" (lower boom) after the heavy tree trunks, covered in metal spikes, that were used as booms to block the river at night to prevent smuggling. The new wall engirded not only the city of Berlin and its suburbs but also some rural land in the east and south.

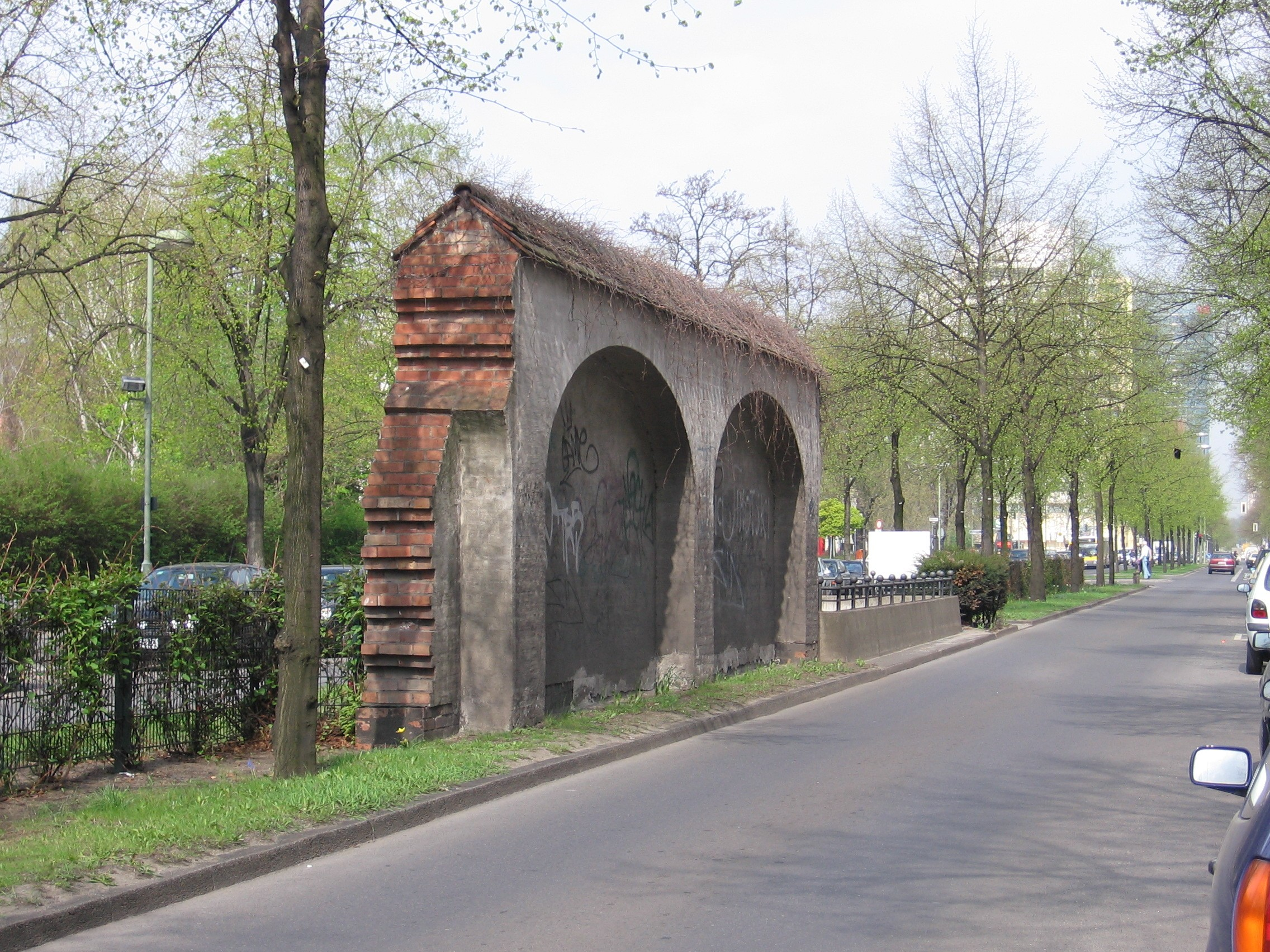
Wall monument made from excavated stones

With the growth of Berlin, the stockades and gates were moved as dictated by circumstances during the following decades. Between 1786 and 1802 the wooden stockades were replaced by stone walls at a height of 4 metres (13 ft). Also, various gates were rebuilt in an imposing style, one notable example being the Brandenburg Gate. In the middle of the century more gates were added to meet the increased transport requirements – these included New Gate (1832), Anhalt Gate (1839/1840), Köpenick Gate (1842) and Water Gate (1848).

The middle of the century was marked by new railway lines terminating in stations built in front of the wall usually near one of its gates. This was the case with Potsdam Station (1838), Anhalt Station (1841), Stettin Station (1842), Hamburg Station (1846) – only Frankfurt Station (1842) was built inside the ring wall. An interconnecting railway line, the ("Berliner Verbindungsbahn") for goods and military transport, was built in 1851 linking the terminal stations and thus turning Berlin into a central transport hub for Prussia and the German Customs Union.

With the rise of Berlin, new suburbs were built outside the Customs Wall, which increasingly became a hindrance to the continued development of the city. In 1860 the Customs Wall was removed and on 1 January 1861 Berlin amalgamated its suburbs resulting in a doubling of the city's population. The remaining walls were demolished for the most part between 1867 and 1870 – including most of the gates. Only the Brandenburg Gate remains today.

With the old walls out of the way, the city developed quickly almost doubling in population over the following decade. The interconnecting railway line (on the southern and western sides) was replaced by the circle line railway in 1871, and the existing railway track was then used by horsecar lines. The route of the southern lines was used for the first electric metro line in 1900, which is now the U1 (Berlin U-Bahn). Its metro stations Silesian Gate (Schlesisches Tor), Cottbus Gate (Kottbusser Tor), Halle Gate (Hallesches Tor), and former Stralau Gate (Stralauer Tor) are a reminder of its heritage. The following streets follow the original route of the customs wall: Stresemannstraße (former Königgrätzer Straße), Marchlewskistraße, Friedenstraße, Prenzlauer Berg avenue, part of Prenzlauer Allee, Torstraße, Hannoversche Straße, Charitéstraße, part of Reinhardtstraße, and Ebertstraße.

== Gates ==
The eighteen city gates and two river gates are still visible on the map, their names having been given to squares and streets. In clockwise order these are:

- Brandenburg Gate (Brandenburger Tor at Pariser Platz /Unter den Linden), the only city gate left.
- Unterbaum (near Unterbaumstraße).
- New Gate (Neues Tor at today's "Platz vor dem Neuen Tor", design by Karl Friedrich Schinkel).
- Oranienburg Gate (Oranienburger Tor at Torstraße /Friedrichstraße) – the original gate was sold to Groß Behnitz
- Hamburg Gate (Hamburger Tor at Torstraße /Kleine Hamburger Straße).
- Rosenthal Gate (Rosenthaler Tor at Torstraße /Rosenthaler Straße near Rosenthaler Platz).
- Schönhausen Gate (Schönhauser Tor at Torstraße /Schönhauser Allee).
- Prenzlau Gate (Prenzlauer Tor at Torstraße /Prenzlauer Allee).
- Bernau Gate (Bernauer Tor, since 1809 "Königstor", at Greifswalder Straße /Am Friedrichshain)
- Landsberg Gate (Landsberger Tor at Landsberger Allee /Friedenstraße).
- Frankfurt Gate (Frankfurter Tor, west of the current location somewhere near U-Bahnhof Weberwiese).
- Stralau Gate (Stralauer Tor, earlier named "Mühlentor" / Mills Gate) (Warschauer Straße /Stralauer Allee /Mühlenstraße).
- Oberbaum (Oberbaumbrücke).
- Silesian Gate (Schlesisches Tor, earlier "Wendentor" / Wends Gate) (Skalitzer Straße /Schlesische Straße am U-Bahnhof Schlesisches Tor).
- Köpenick Gate (Köpenicker Tor at Lausitzer Platz).
- Cottbus Gate (Kottbusser Tor at Skalitzer Straße /Kottbusser Straße near U-Bahnhof Kottbusser Tor).
- Water Gate (Wassertor on today's Wassertorplatz): named the crossing point of the new Luisenstadt canal.
- Halle Gate (Hallesches Tor at Hallesches Ufer /Mehringplatz near U-Bahnhof Hallesches Tor), After the original gate was dismantled, two buildings were built by Heinrich Strack in 1876–9. The twin structures were destroyed in World War II.
- Anhalt Gate (Anhalter Tor at Stresemannstraße /Anhalter Straße near S-Bahnhof Anhalter Bahnhof, design by Karl Friedrich Schinkel).
- Potsdam Gate (Potsdamer Tor at Leipziger Platz /Potsdamer Platz; design by Karl Friedrich Schinkel, damaged in WW2, demolished in the 1950s).
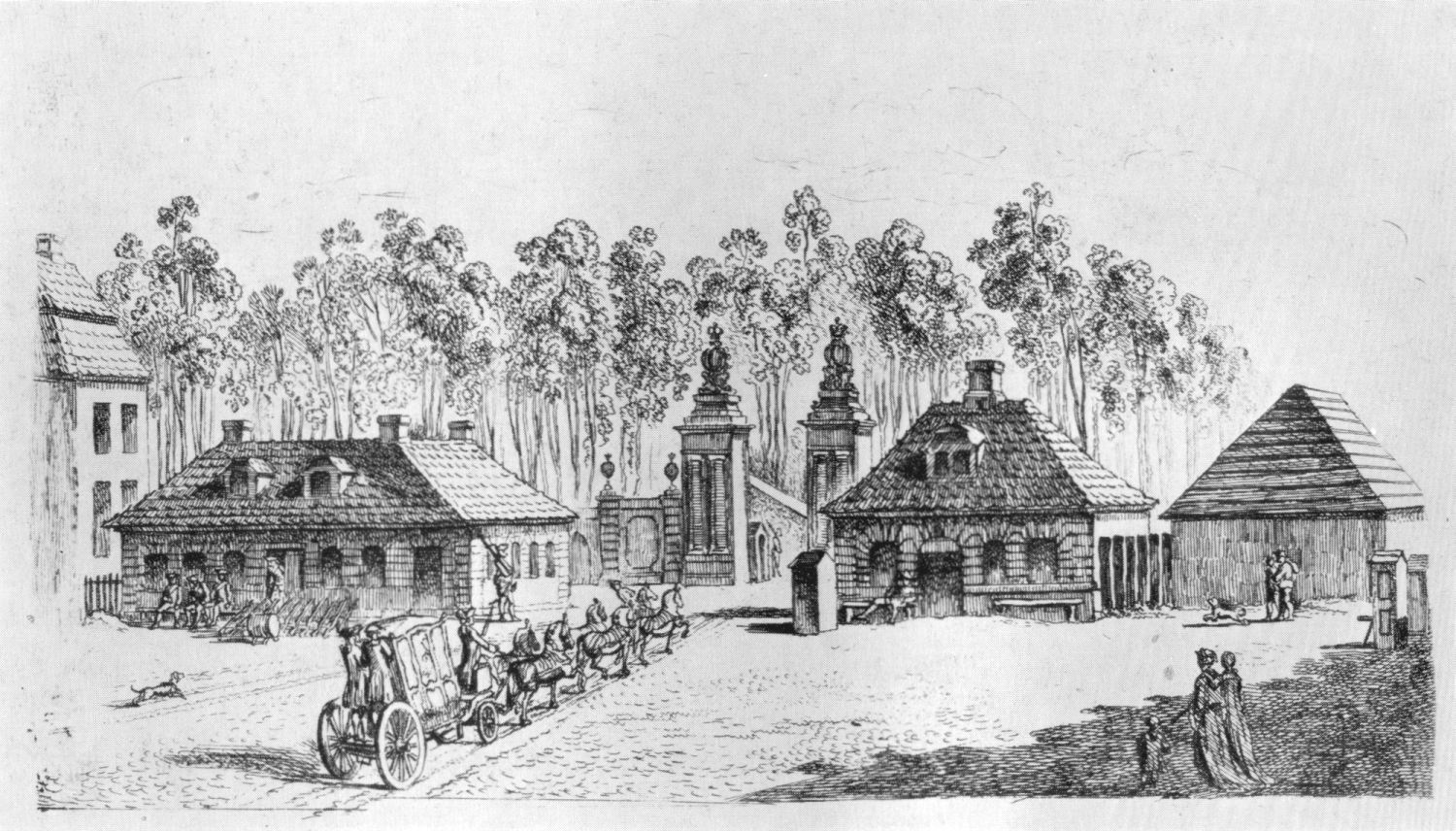
Brandenburg Gate in 1764, view to the west

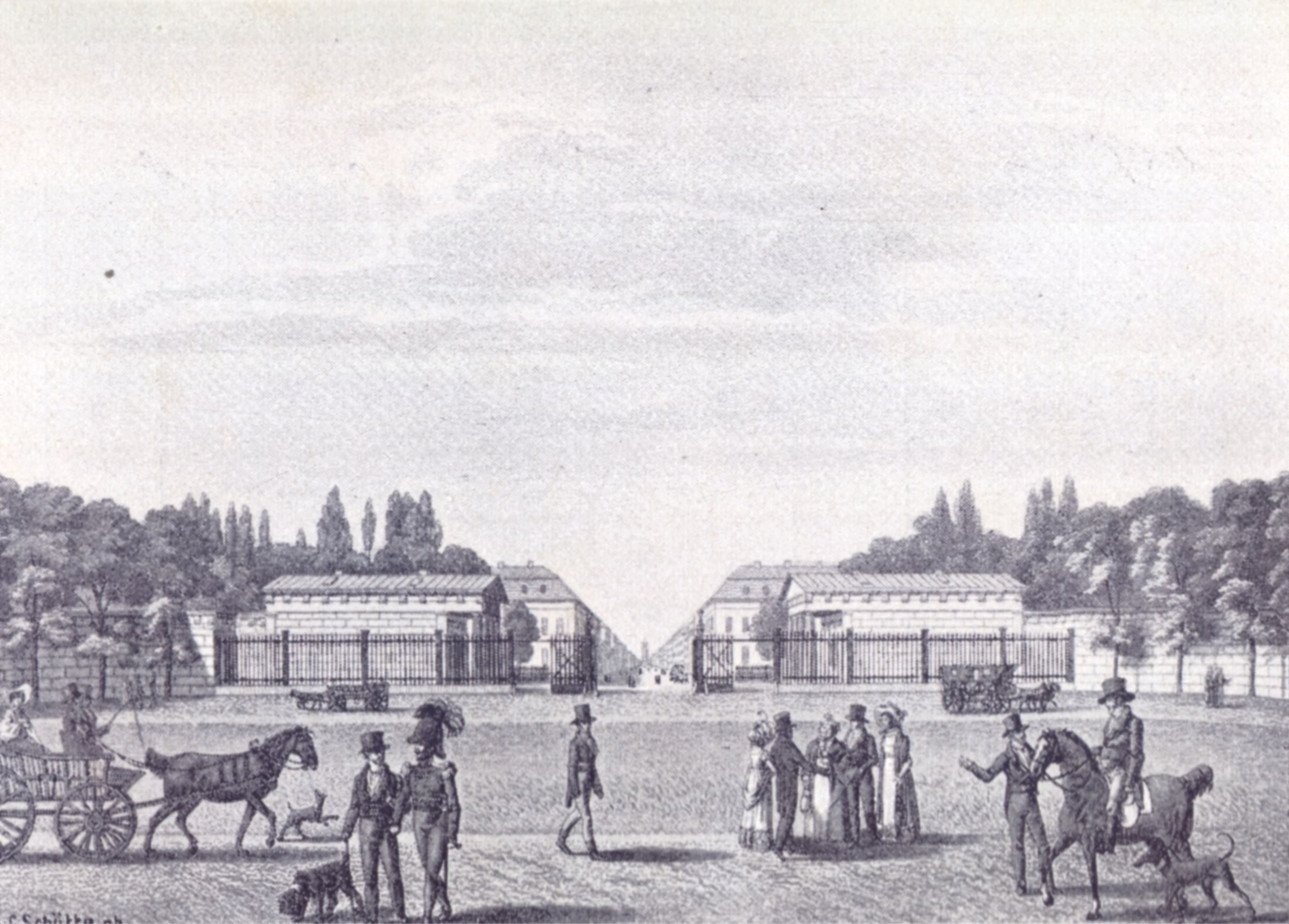
Leipzig Gate/Potsdam Gate around 1830

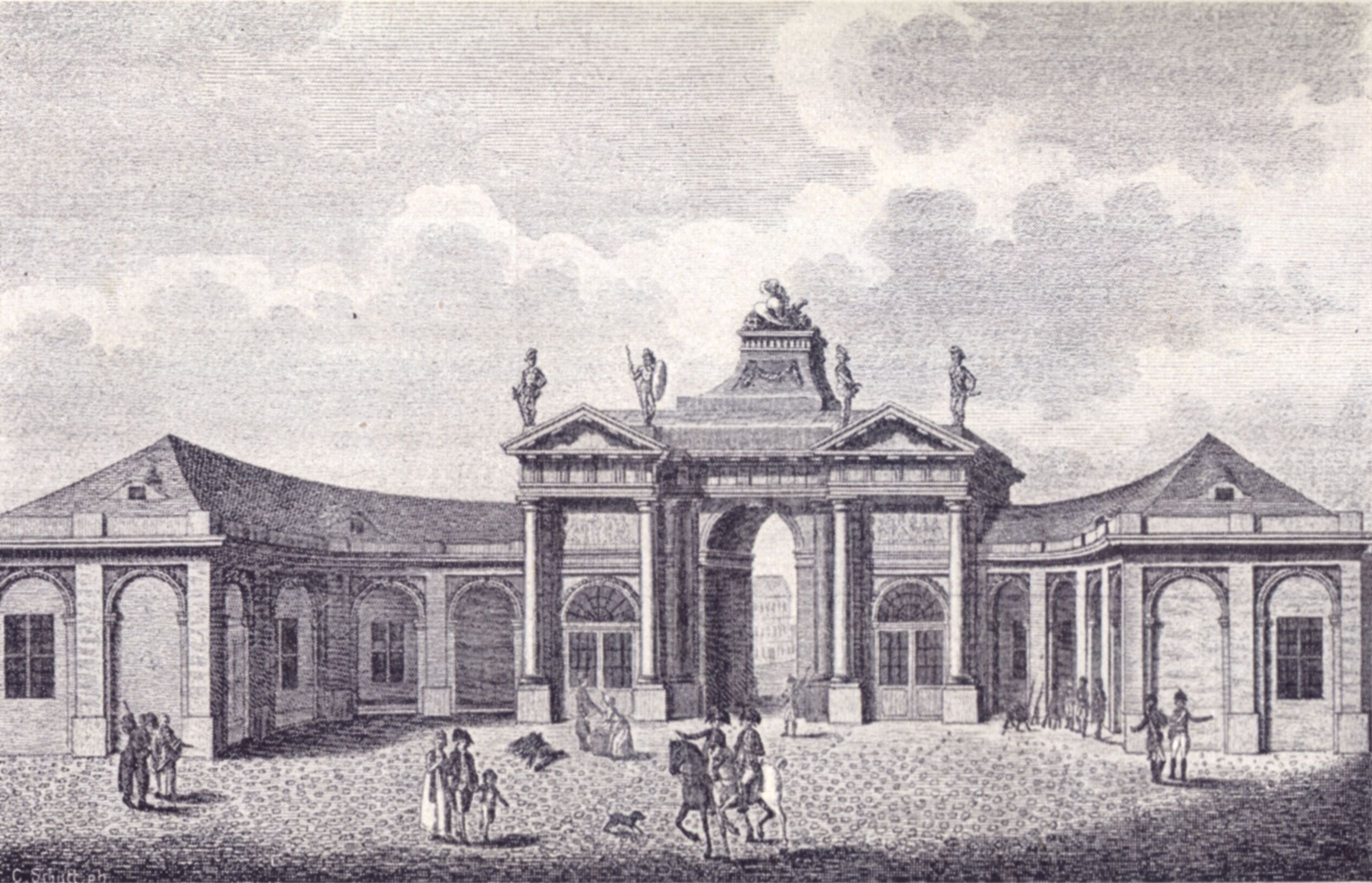
Rosenthal Gate around 1800

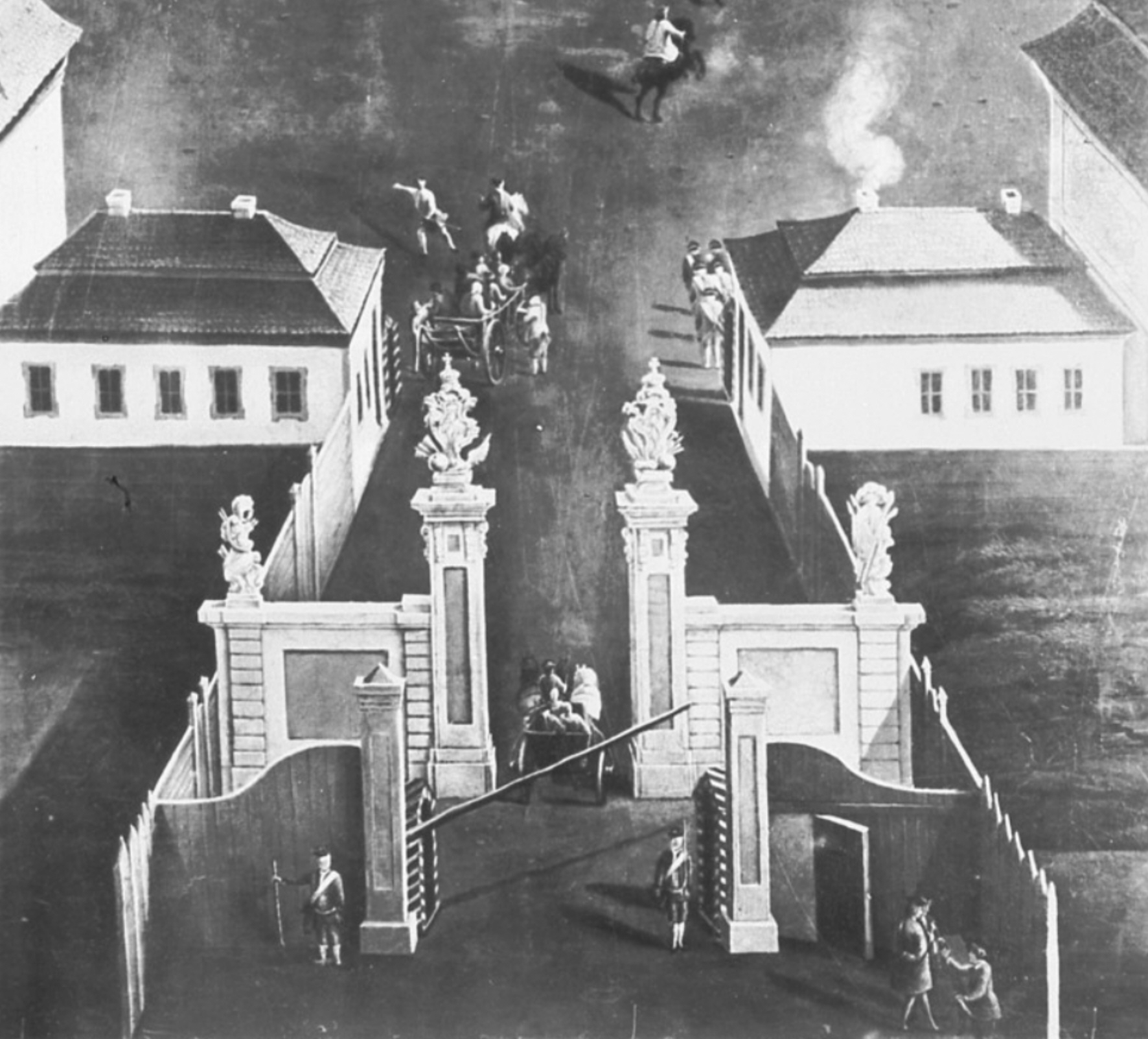
Halle Gate around 1800

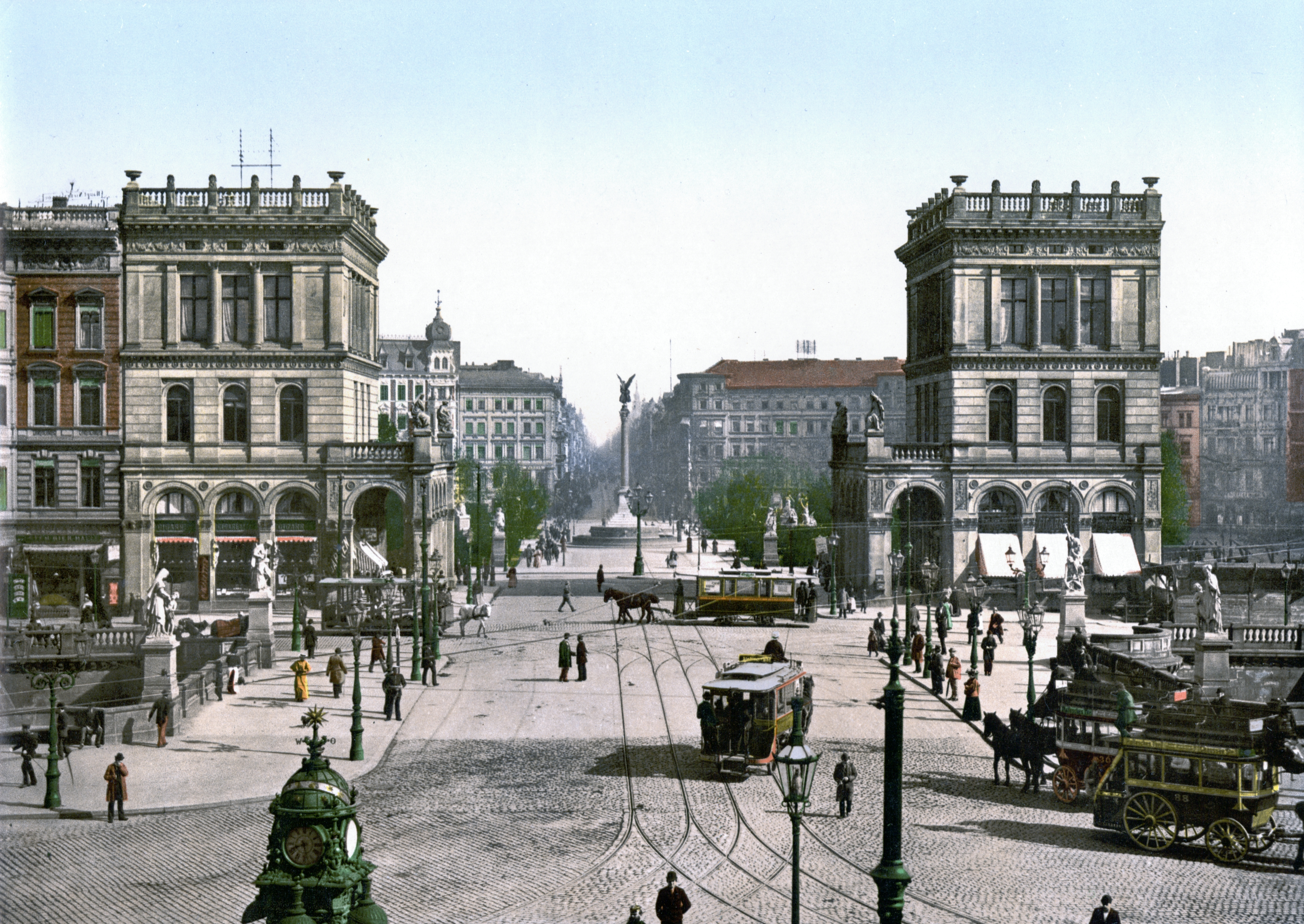
Halle Gate around 1900

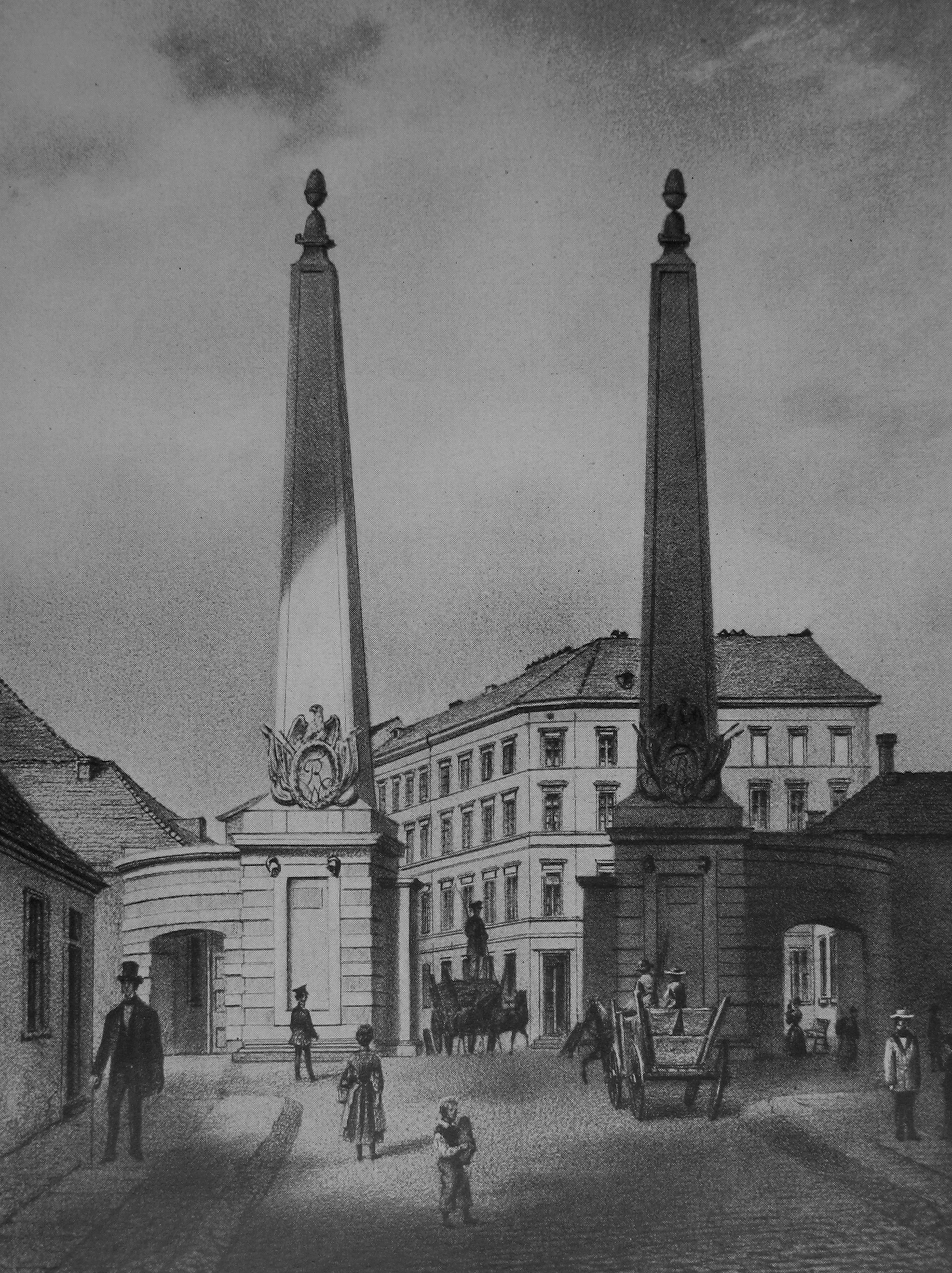
Hamburg Gate 1860

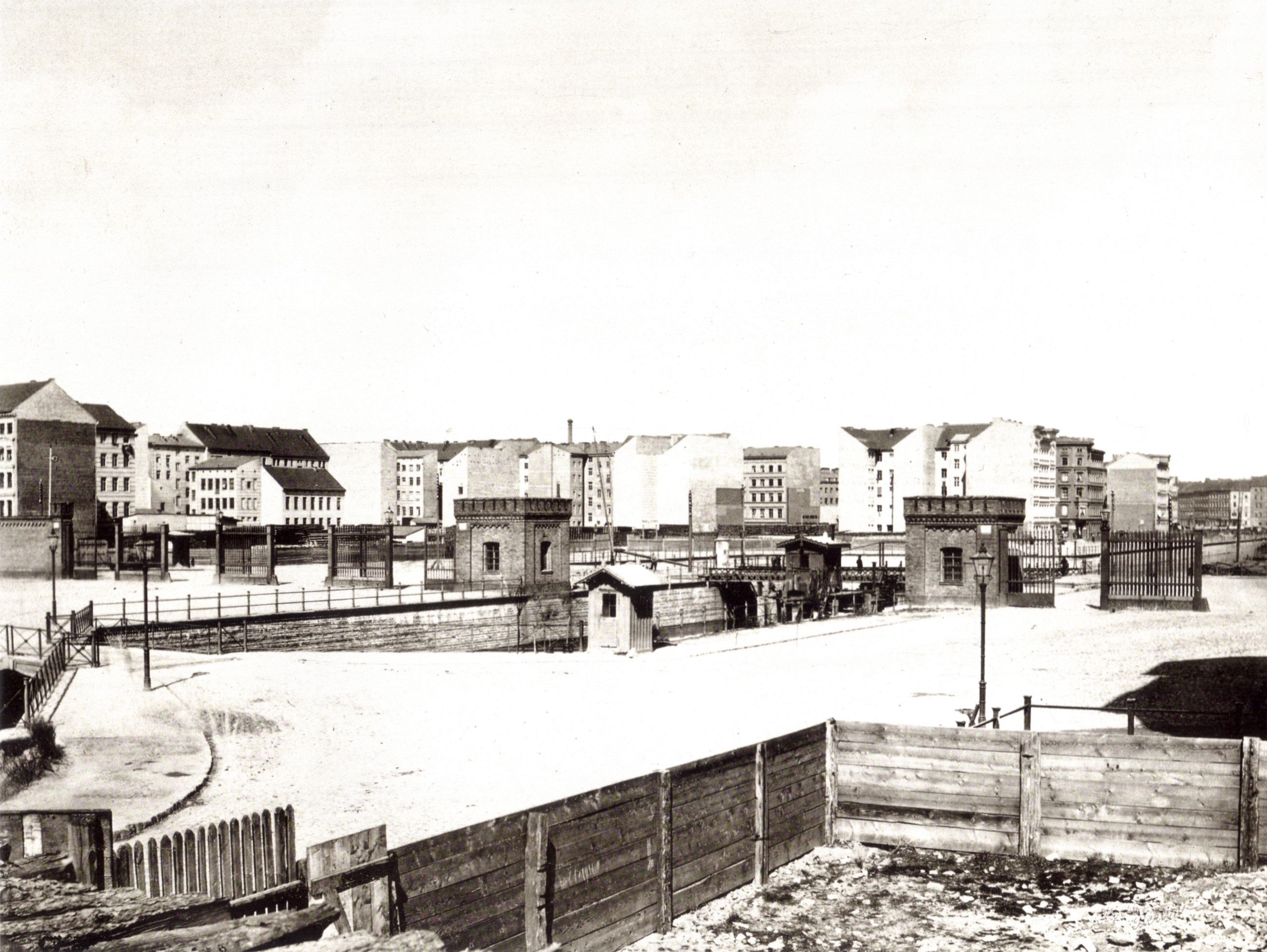
Water Gate in 1865

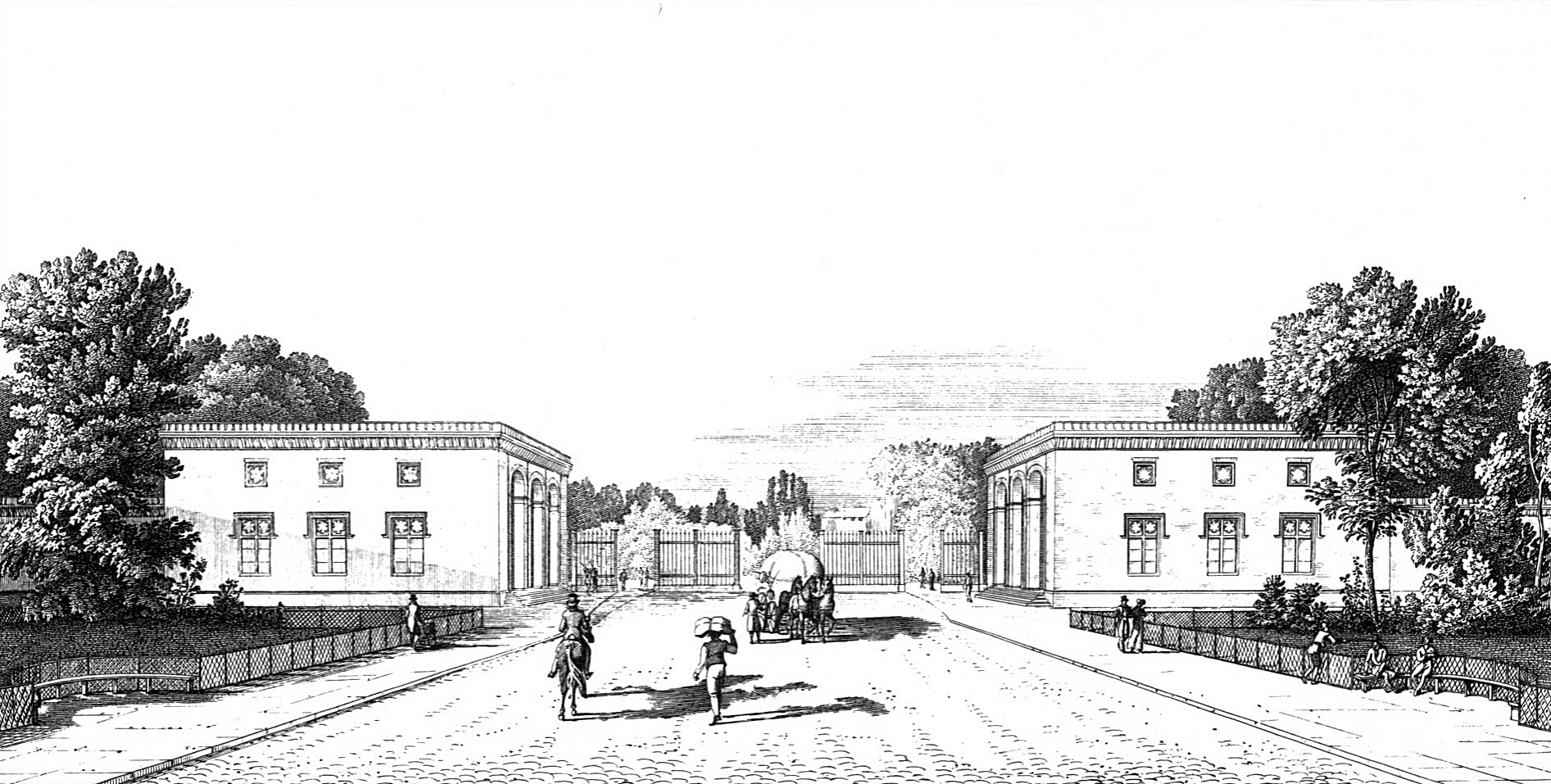
New Gate 1866

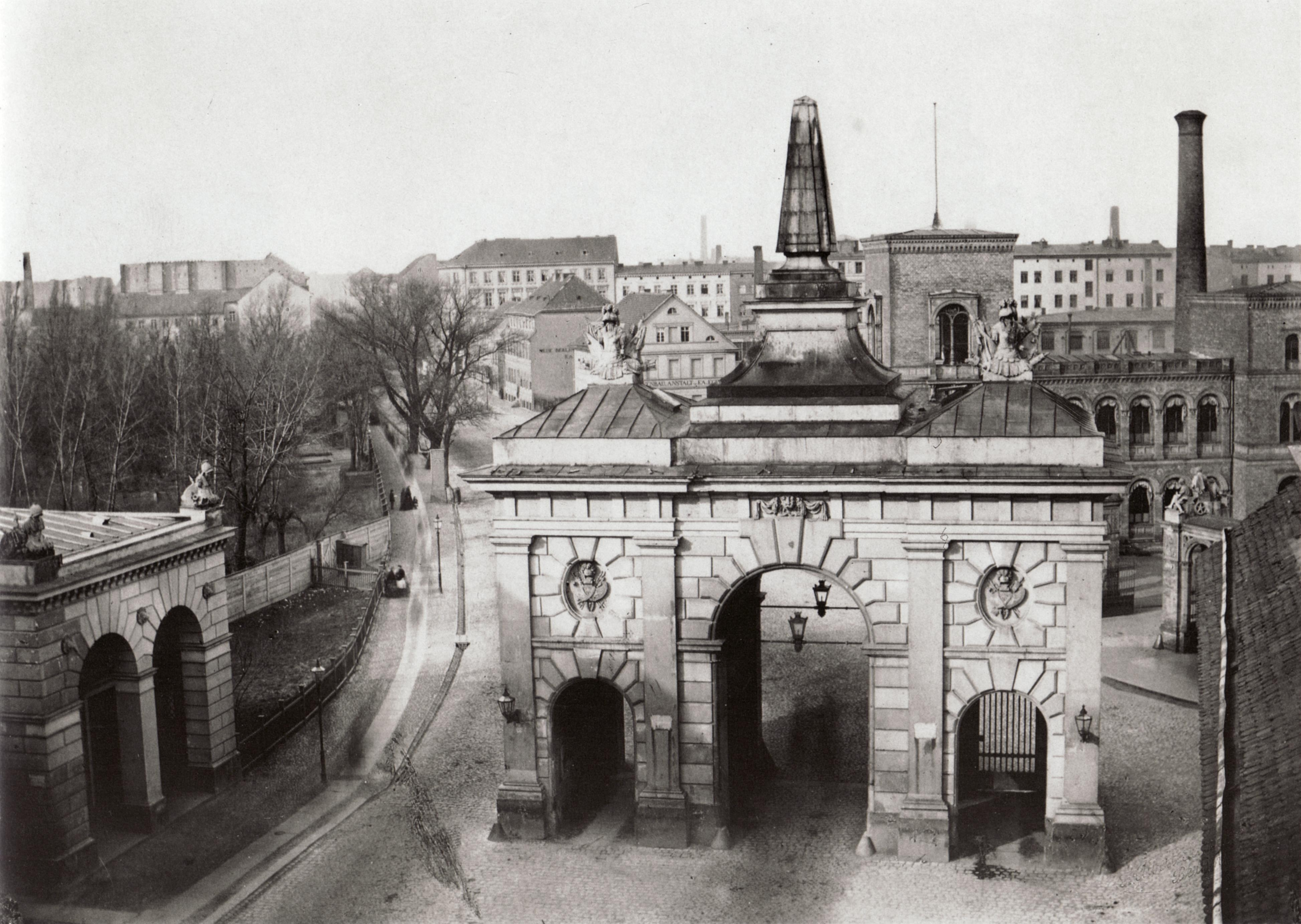
Oranienburg Gate in 1867
