= Berlin Warschauer Straße station =

Railway station in Berlin, Germany

Coordinates: 52.506°N 13.449°E

Warschauer Straße
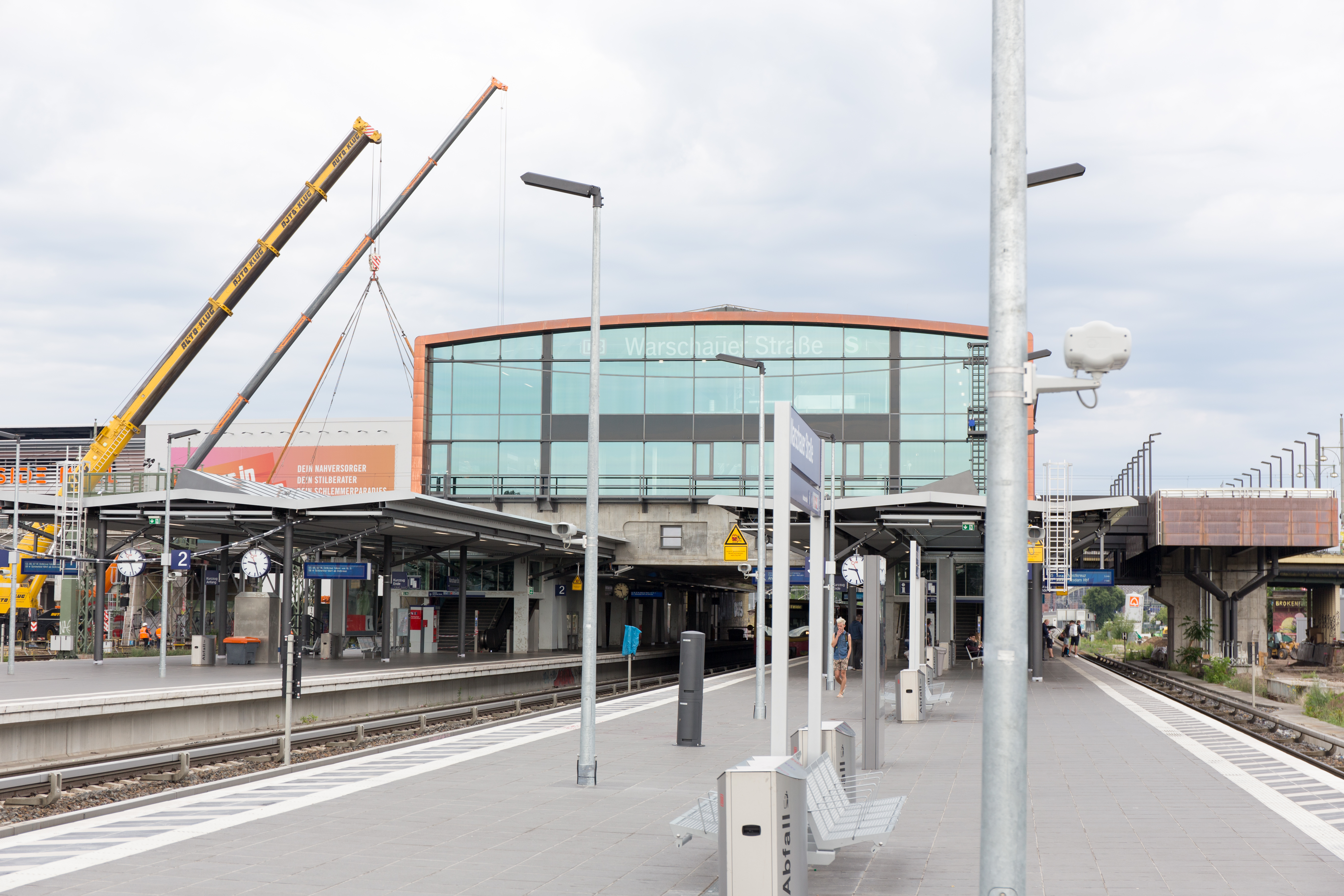
- S-Bahnhof Warschauer Straße in 2019

General information
- Location: Warschauer Straße 34; 10243 Berlin; Friedrichshain-Kreuzberg, Berlin, Berlin; Germany
- Owner: DB Netz
- Operator: DB Station&Service
- Lines: Prussian Eastern Railway; Berlin–Wrocław railway
- Platforms: 2 island platforms
- Tracks: 4 (only S-Bahn)
- Train operators: S-Bahn Berlin
- Connections: : 300, 347, N1

Construction
- Accessible: No (under construction)
- Architect: Dörr Ludolf Wimmer Architekten, Berlin

Other information
- Station code: 6550
- DS100 code: BWRS
- IBNR: 8089045
- Category: 4
- Fare zone: : Berlin A/5555
- Website: www.bahnhof.de

Passengers
- 85,000

Services
Preceding station	Berlin S-Bahn	Following station
Ostbahnhof towards Spandau	S3	Ostkreuz towards Erkner
Ostbahnhof towards Westkreuz	S5	Ostkreuz towards Strausberg Nord
Ostbahnhof towards Potsdam Hbf	S7	Ostkreuz towards Ahrensfelde
Terminus	S75	Ostkreuz towards Wartenberg
Ostbahnhof towards Spandau	S9	Treptower Park towards BER Airport
Preceding station	Berlin U-Bahn	Following station
Schlesisches Tor towards Uhlandstraße	U1	Terminus
Schlesisches Tor towards Krumme Lanke	U3	Terminus
Location

Warschauer Straße station is an S-Bahn and U-Bahn station on Warschauer Straße on the northern bank of the river Spree in the Friedrichshain neighborhood of Berlin, Germany. The two train stations as well as the trams that terminate adjacent to the U-Bahn station together accommodate over 85,000 passengers daily.

== S-Bahn station ==
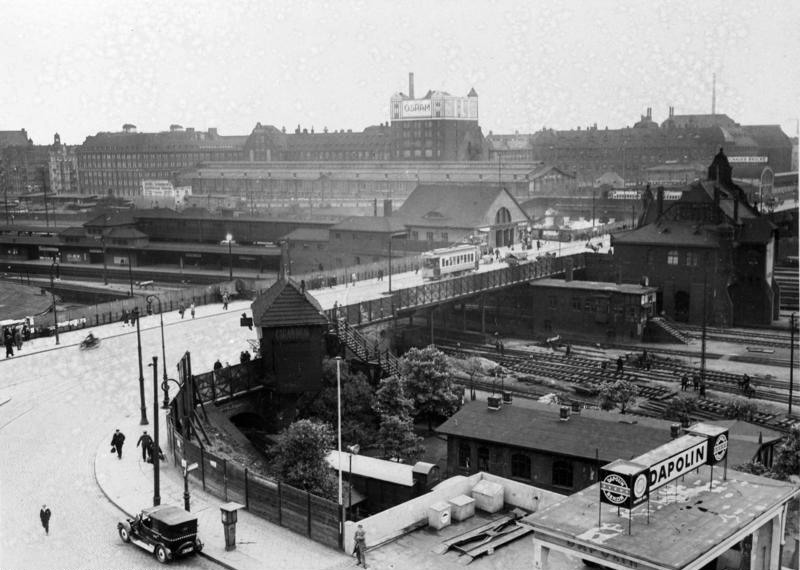
Warschauer Brücke and Warschauer Straße station (1930)

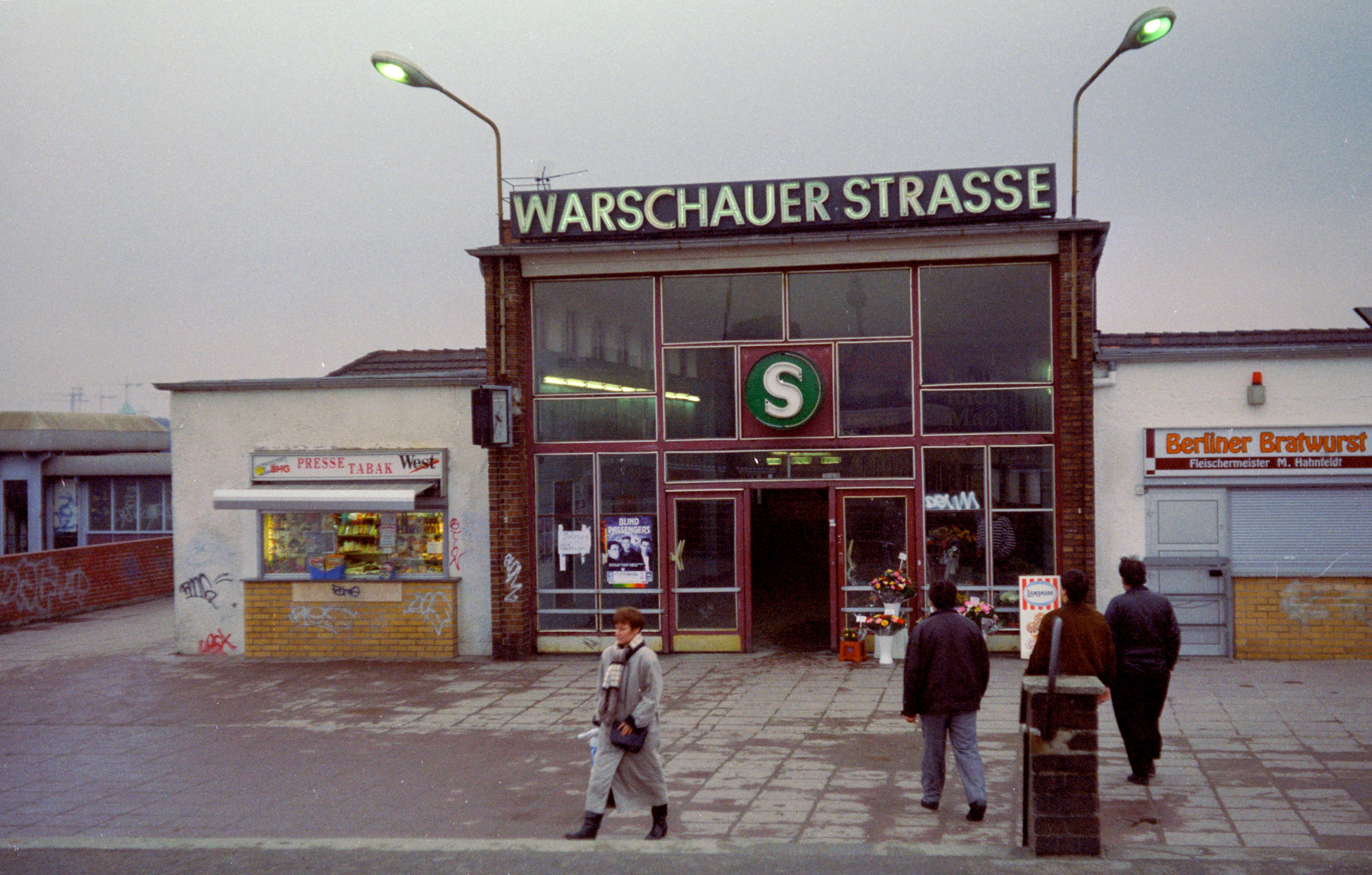
S-Bahn Warschauer Straße station (1994)

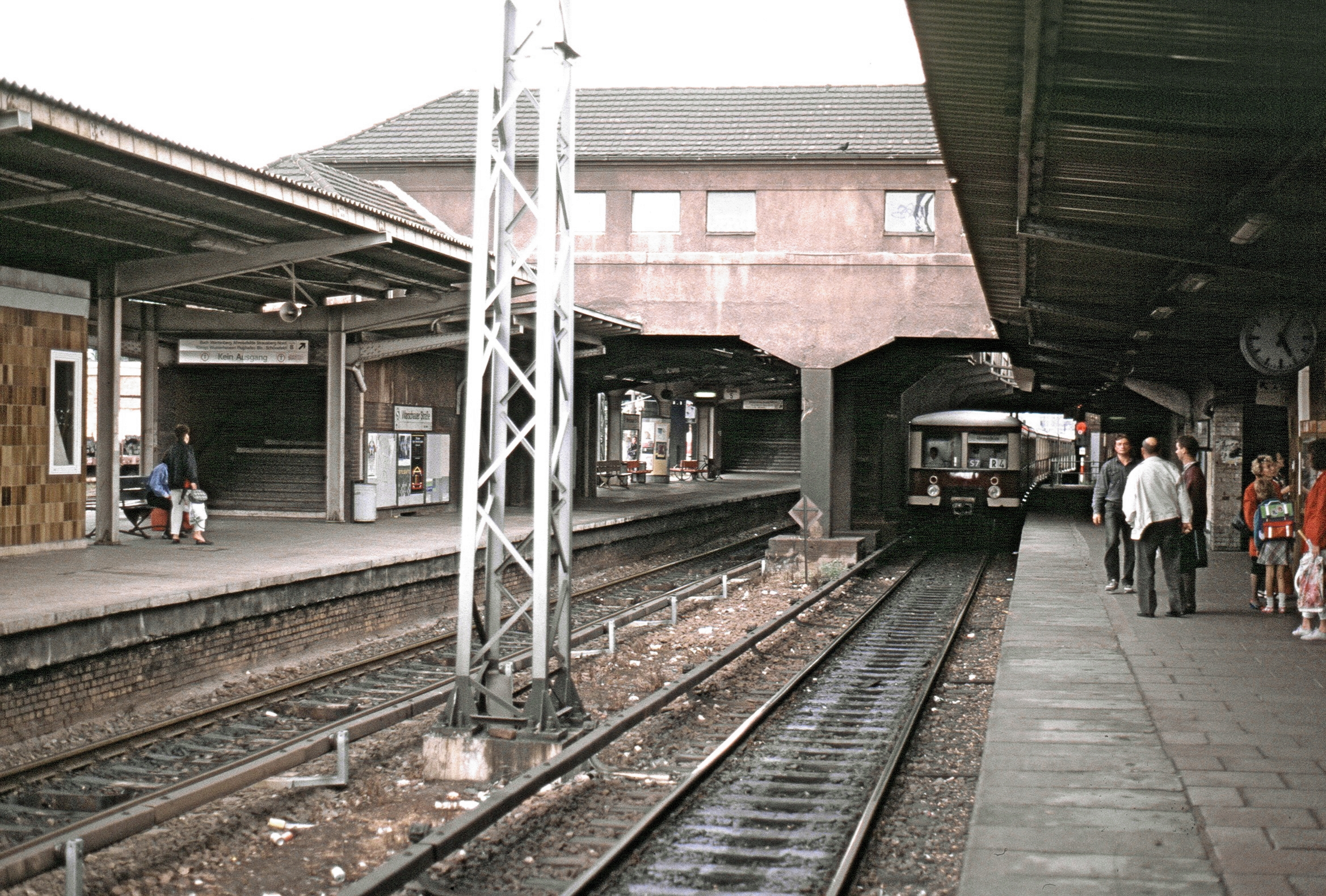
S-Bahnhof Warschauer Straße (1992)

The Warschauer Straße S-Bahn station is located on the eastern side of Warschauer Bridge. The station's current configuration consists of a temporary footbridge and two platforms, one for trains inbound towards the city center, the other outbound towards Ostkreuz and Lichtenberg. The first station building opened on 11 August 1884 and stood until 1903. The second station building, designed by Karl Cornelius, stood from 1903 until 1924. The third station building, designed by Richard Brademann and constructed in 1924, was heavily damaged due to the destruction of Warschauer Bridge during World War II and required extensive reconstruction and alteration.

The station remained largely unchanged for decades. Warschauer Straße station was reconstructed in 1983, and a new platform opened on 20 December 1986. This was in order to provide greater transport access to the increasingly developed northeast districts of the city, Neu-Hohenschönhausen and Marzahn. Due to a lack of maintenance, the station building developed acute structural defects and was closed in late 2004. Soon after, the station building and platform access were demolished in April 2005 and replaced with a temporary walkway and stairs.

As part of a long term renovation and reconstruction project for S-Bahn Ostkreuz, Warschauer Straße, and Ostbahnhof stations, a new reception building and two new central platforms are being built at S-Bahn Warschauer Straße station. March 2012 saw the removal from service and demolition of platforms B and C. The newly rebuilt platform B returned to operation in May 2013 with only one edge of the platform active. Construction planners initially planned to begin construction of the new entrance hall in the summer of 2013, with an opening in 2016. Construction began in 2016 and has progressed quickly to the point where the concrete and steel of the new building has been completed. On Sunday 2 July, two of the temporary Imbiss street food huts were torn down, to be followed in time by the remainder, when the temporary foot bridge along the side of the new station building is also removed.

== Nearby landmarks ==
The Oberbaumbrücke, the East Side Gallery, and the Mercedes-Benz Arena (former O2 World arena) can be reached on foot. Three discothèques are located in the basement vaults of the U-Bahn building: The Matrix Club, since 1996, one of the biggest venues in Berlin with up to nine bars and five dancefloors, the Narva Lounge and the Busche.

== Line information ==
The station is served by S-Bahn lines S3, S5, S7, S75 and S9, and U-Bahn lines U1 and U3. Connections are available to tram lines M10 and M13, and to bus lines 300 and 347.
