= Potsdam Gate =

Coordinates: 52°30′34″N 13°22′38″E

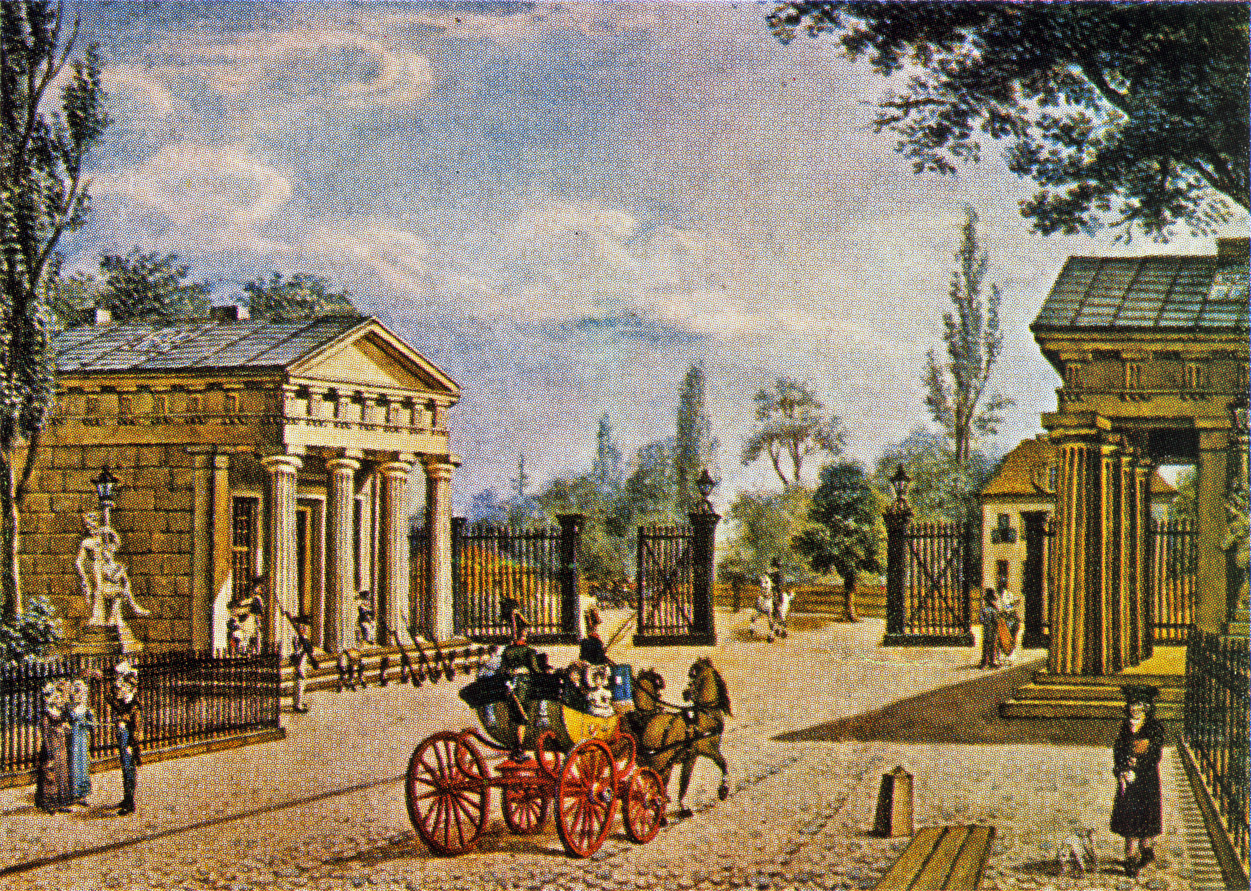
The Potsdam Gate after 1824.

The Potsdam Gate (German: Potsdamer Tor) was one of the western gates of the Berlin Customs Wall, south of the still-standing Brandenburg Gate. It was originally constructed in 1734, and then rebuilt in 1824 as a neoclassic imposing gateway. It was one of the few gates that were left when the Customs Wall was demolished (1867–1870) but it suffered severe damage during the bombing of Berlin in World War II (1943–1945). Its remains were demolished in 1961, when the Berlin Wall was erected.

== See also ==
- Potsdamer Platz
