= Berlin Görlitzer Bahnhof =

Railway station in Berlin, Germany

Coordinates: 52.499°N 13.431°E

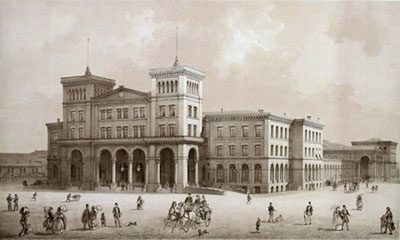
- Empfangsgebäude des Görlitzer Bahnhofes in Berlin, an 1872 painting depicting the station entrance hall

General information
- Location: Friedrichshain-Kreuzberg, Berlin, Berlin; Germany

Construction
- Architect: August Orth

History
- Opened: 1866
- Closed: 1951
Location

Görlitzer Bahnhof was the name of the Berlin railway terminus for the mainline link between the capital, Cottbus in Brandenburg and Görlitz in Lower Silesia (since 1945 Saxony). It stood overlooking Spreewaldplatz in the Outer Luisenstadt, the eastern part of Kreuzberg but wartime bombing and Cold War tensions led to its closure and eventual demolition.

The Görlitzer Bahnhof (Berlin U-Bahn) station was named after this historic station and is located on a different site nearby.

== The rise ==
The station was designed by August Orth, an architect later responsible for the Emmauskirche in nearby Lausitzer Platz, and built between 1865 and 1867 in the Palazzo style of the Italian Renaissance. It formed part of a railway expansion project that would link Berlin with Cottbus and Görlitz, and then ultimately with cities such as Sagan (Żagań) and Breslau (Wrocław) (both in Poland since 1945) and Vienna in Austria.

On 13 June 1866 a military train bound for the Austro-Prussian war became the first train to leave the then incomplete station site. The connection was one of convenience because the military had built their barracks in neighbouring Wrangelstraße.

Shortly afterwards, on 13 September, a regular passenger service began between Berlin and Cottbus. By late 1867 the Berlin-Görlitz line was complete and the route, which passed through the countryside of the Spreewald and Lower Lusatia and the towns of Königs Wusterhausen, Lübben, and Lübbenau, officially opened on 31 December 1867. Although founded by a private company, owned by industrialist and "rail king" Bethel Henry Strousberg, the service was nationalised on 28 March 1882.

The new line proved an immediate success with the public. After only a few months, it was accommodating 70,000 travellers a day and during the whole of 1880, approximately 1.5 million people used Görlitzer Bahnhof. Its popularity had a stimulating effect on the surrounding area, with shops and cafés springing up in the neighbouring streets, helping to establish it as one of the liveliest in the city.

Aside from the transport of people, the line also served as a vital trade route connecting the capital with the cloth factories, and the brick and glass works of industrial Görlitz. Lausitz proved to be not only a rich source of Spreewald gherkins but also, more importantly, of coal.

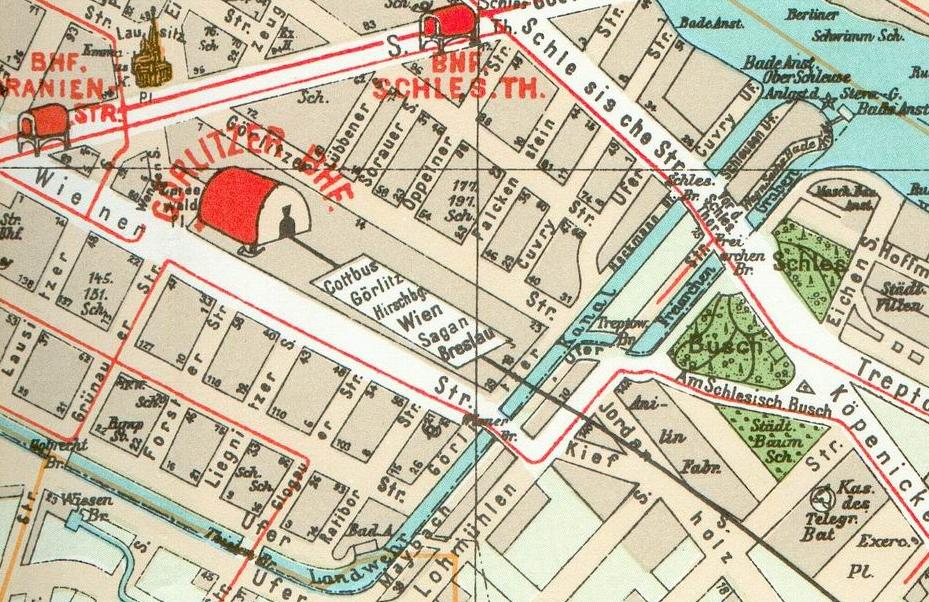
A section of the 1902 Pharus Plan of Berlin showing Görlitzer Bahnhof and the eastern Kreuzberg environs

=== Görlitzer Tunnel ===
In order to improve access between the neighbourhoods that emerged around Görlitzer Straße (the Wrangelkiez) and Wiener Straße (the Reichenberger Kiez), an underpass was constructed under the railway site. Opened to the public in 1910, this connected Oppelner Straße on the northern side with Liegnitzer Straße to the south. This was officially known as the ‘Görlitzer Tunnel’, although it would later also acquire the nickname "Harnröhre“ (Urethra).

== The fall ==
During World War II, the Allied aerial bombardments of 3 February 1945, which left 3,255 dead or missing and over 119,000 homeless in the surrounding Kreuzberg district, caused severe damage to the station. Nevertheless, by June, a mere month after the surrender of Berlin, a makeshift Görlitzer Bahnhof was back in service.

The revival proved temporary, however. From 25 September 1946 all its long-distance trains were redirected to Schlesischer Bahnhof (renamed Ostbahnhof in 1950) on the central Stadtbahn. Furthermore, over the next few years the ongoing expansion of the electric S-Bahn system would supersede its role in the local network too. Ultimately though, it was the deepening crisis in political relations between East and West that sealed the station's fate, and made its position as a Western station operating an Eastern line untenable. It therefore came as no surprise when the GDR decided to close Görlitzer Bahnhof to passenger trains on 29 April 1951.

Although the complete absence of the railway on the 1954 Berlin city map suggests the station was subsequently demolished and cleared, it actually remained relatively undisturbed in its bombed-out state for ten years after the closure. The arrival of the Wall in 1961, however, quashed any hopes of a reconstruction.

Over the following decade or so all the remaining station buildings were demolished, beginning with the large platform hall in 1962 and the main reception area in 1967.

The remaining public buildings – which included two towers, various waiting rooms and a restaurant – were levelled in 1975 during a wave of demolitions during the 1970s that claimed many historic victims across the city. The reason given at the time for the demolition was that the buildings served no practical purpose in standing empty and as a result were being occupied by an "anti-social" element. The removal of these "ruins" would therefore be better for the image of West Berlin. By 1976 the site lay mostly empty.

== Continuing use of Görlitzer Bahnhof after closure ==
Although the station stood abandoned and the site lay undeveloped for over thirty years, the area was never dormant. Since the closure in 1951, the land and buildings were used variously for coal storage, as a scrapyard, an auto garage, and for other small enterprises. Furthermore, the northern goods side of the station site remained in active use by the Deutsche Reichsbahn for transporting freight between West and East Berlin, and for this reason a border crossing point stood on the bridge over the Landwehrkanal. This passage of freight was permanently discontinued on 30 June 1985.

Between the years 1984 and 1987 a local swimming pool, the Spreewald Bad, an innovative structure designed by Christoph Langhof architects, was built on the site of the former station.

Before the remaining area from Skalitzer Straße up to the Görlitzer Ufer was developed into Görlitzer Park in the early 1990s, it was a waste ground partly accessible by the public. This vacancy led to the site being occupied during the summer of 1989 by the Mutoid Waste Company, an anarchist art commune from London. The location was chosen in part because of its proximity to the Wall. On one memorable occasion the scrap metal artists created a "Peace Bird" contraption which featured a bird suspended high in the air which was able to roll along the railway tracks to the border point on the bridge and, in a gesture of peace towards the GDR, exhibit the bird to those in the east.

Although the Görlitzer Tunnel remained in use until the beginning of the 1990s, the public access to the site prompted by the new park left it redundant. By the creation of a 'natural' arena in the centre of the park, the tunnel was largely destroyed, although its remains were incorporated into the design.

== The remains ==
The remaining office building and one of the goods sheds

The only obvious physical remains of the station site are the two goods sheds, an old office building, the railway bridge and the remnants of the underpass visible in a crater in the centre of the park. Nevertheless, it is possible to follow part of the old railway route on foot, as it leads out of the park, over the Landwehrkanal and then comes to an end over Elsenstraße in Treptow, just before the original line would have met the ring of the S-bahn.

The historic building itself lives on in existing local names. In 1926, the local U-Bahn station Oranienstraße was renamed as Görlitzer Bahnhof to indicate the neighbouring mainline terminus but despite the latter's demise the U-bahn stop maintains the historical name, much like with the similarly doomed Anhalter Bahnhof. In addition to this, the road that runs alongside the western side of Görlitzer Park, was renamed Wiener Straße in 1873, because the first trains connecting Berlin and the Austrian capital Vienna left from Görlitzer Bahnhof. Likewise, the neighbouring squares Spreewaldplatz and Lausitzer Platz were named after the areas of countryside once accessible from its platforms.

== Filming location ==
The 1966 film Funeral in Berlin used the front of the building, which still stood at that time, as the filming location for the fictional East Berlin "Marx-Engels-Platz 59".
