= Oberbaum Bridge =

Bridge crossing of the River Spree

Coordinates: 52°30′07″N 13°26′44″E

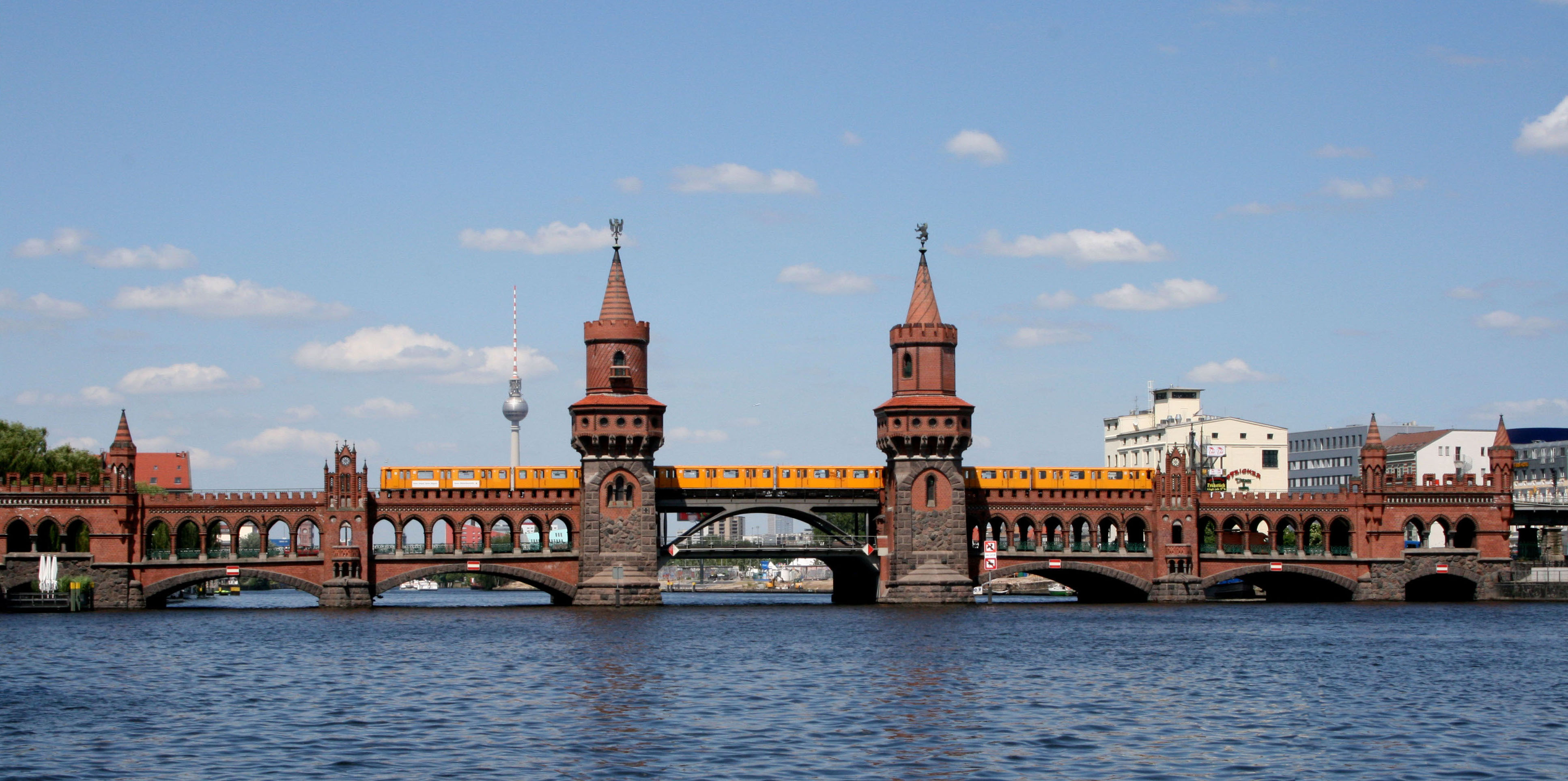
A U-Bahn train crosses the Oberbaum Bridge

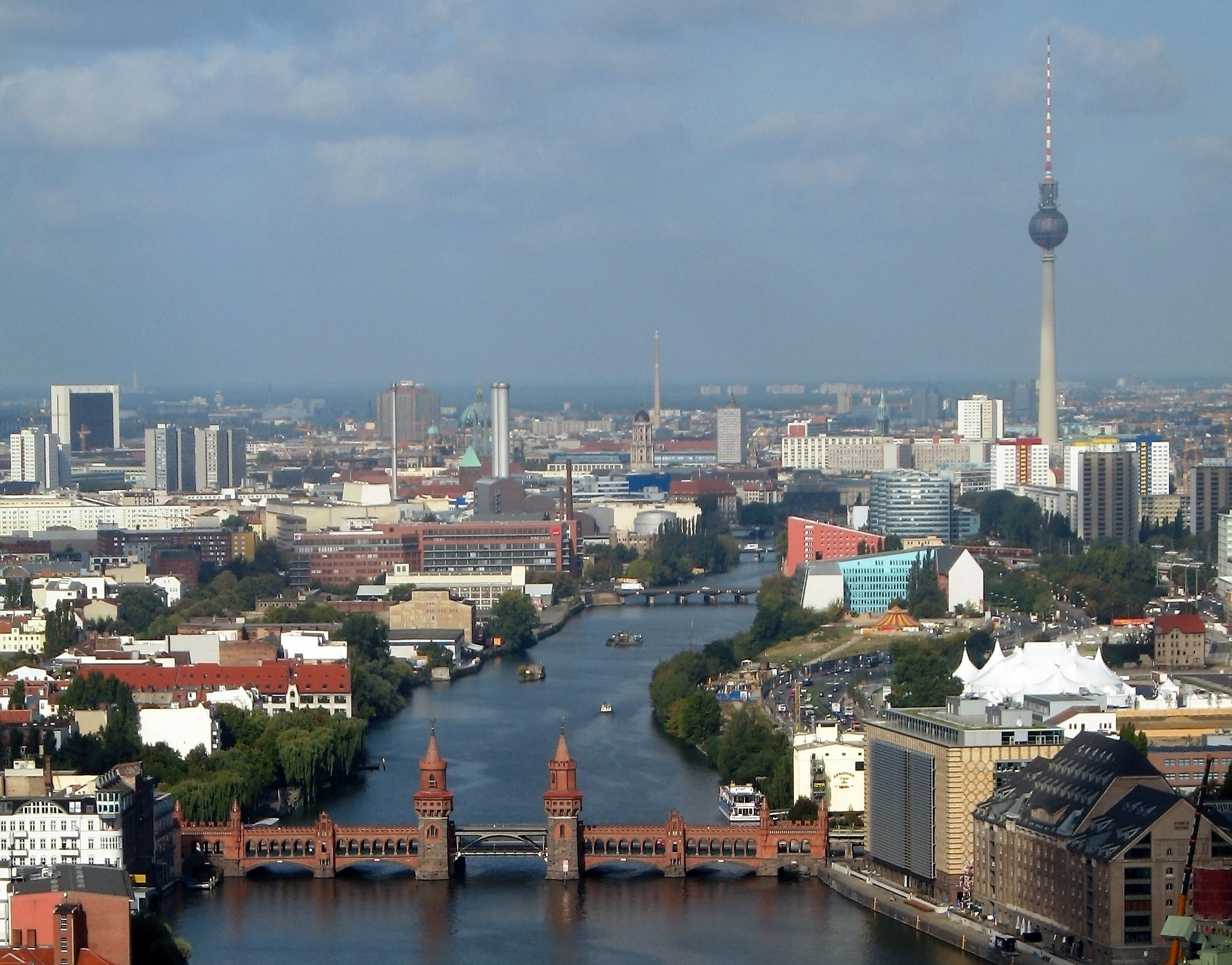
Oberbaum Bridge connecting the districts of Kreuzberg and Friedrichshain, Berlin TV Tower in the background

The Oberbaum Bridge (German: Oberbaumbrücke) is a double-deck bridge crossing Berlin, Germany's River Spree, considered one of the city's landmarks. It links Friedrichshain and Kreuzberg, former boroughs that were divided by the Berlin Wall, and has become an important symbol of Berlin's unity.

The lower deck of the bridge carries a roadway, which connects Oberbaum Straße to the south of the river with Warschauer Straße to the north. The upper deck of the bridge carries Berlin U-Bahn lines U1 and U3, between Schlesisches Tor and Warschauer Straße stations.

The bridge appears prominently in the films Run Lola Run and Unknown as well as the TV series Berlin Station.

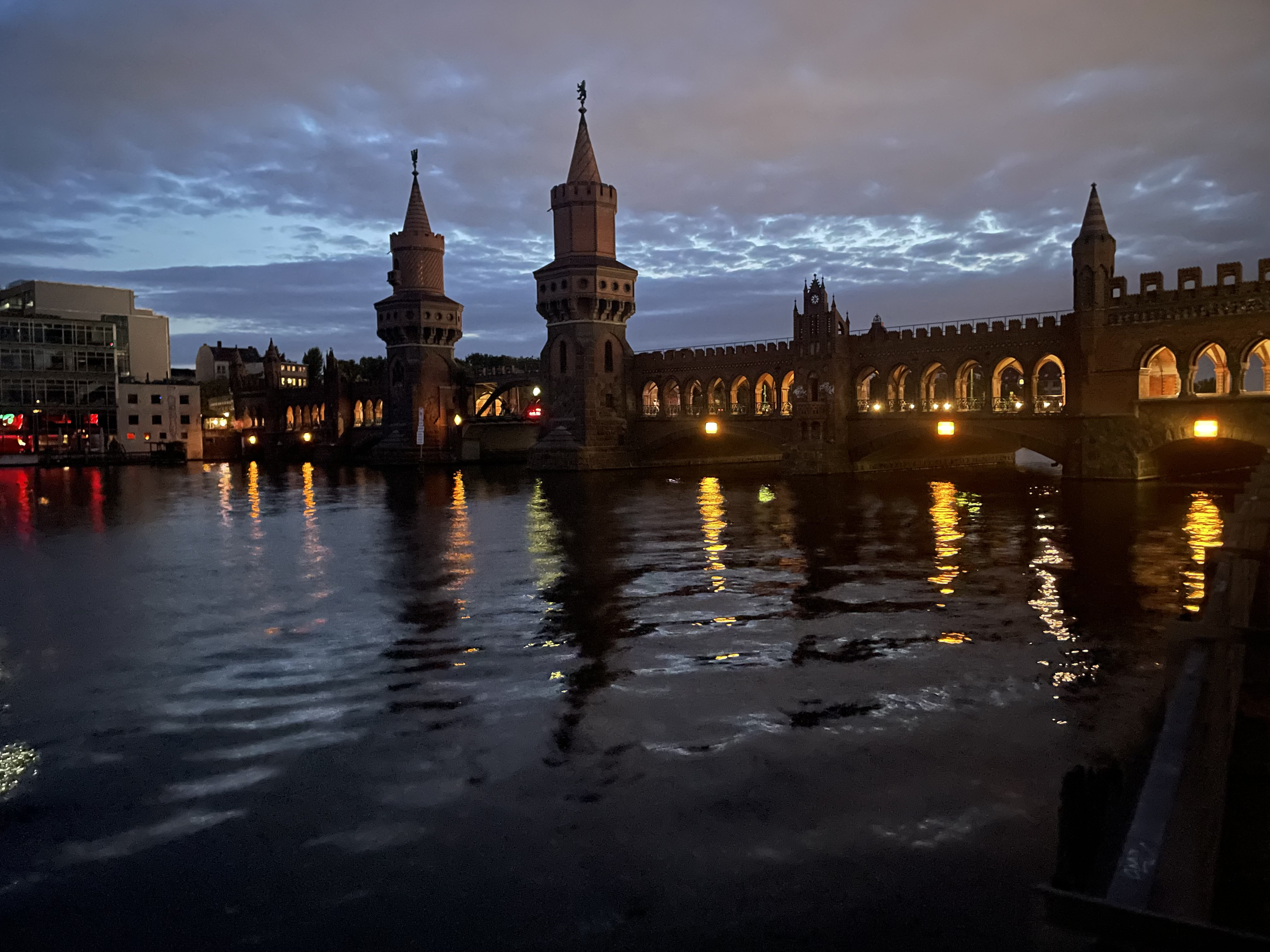
The Oberbaum Brücke viewed just after sunset, August 2024

== History ==
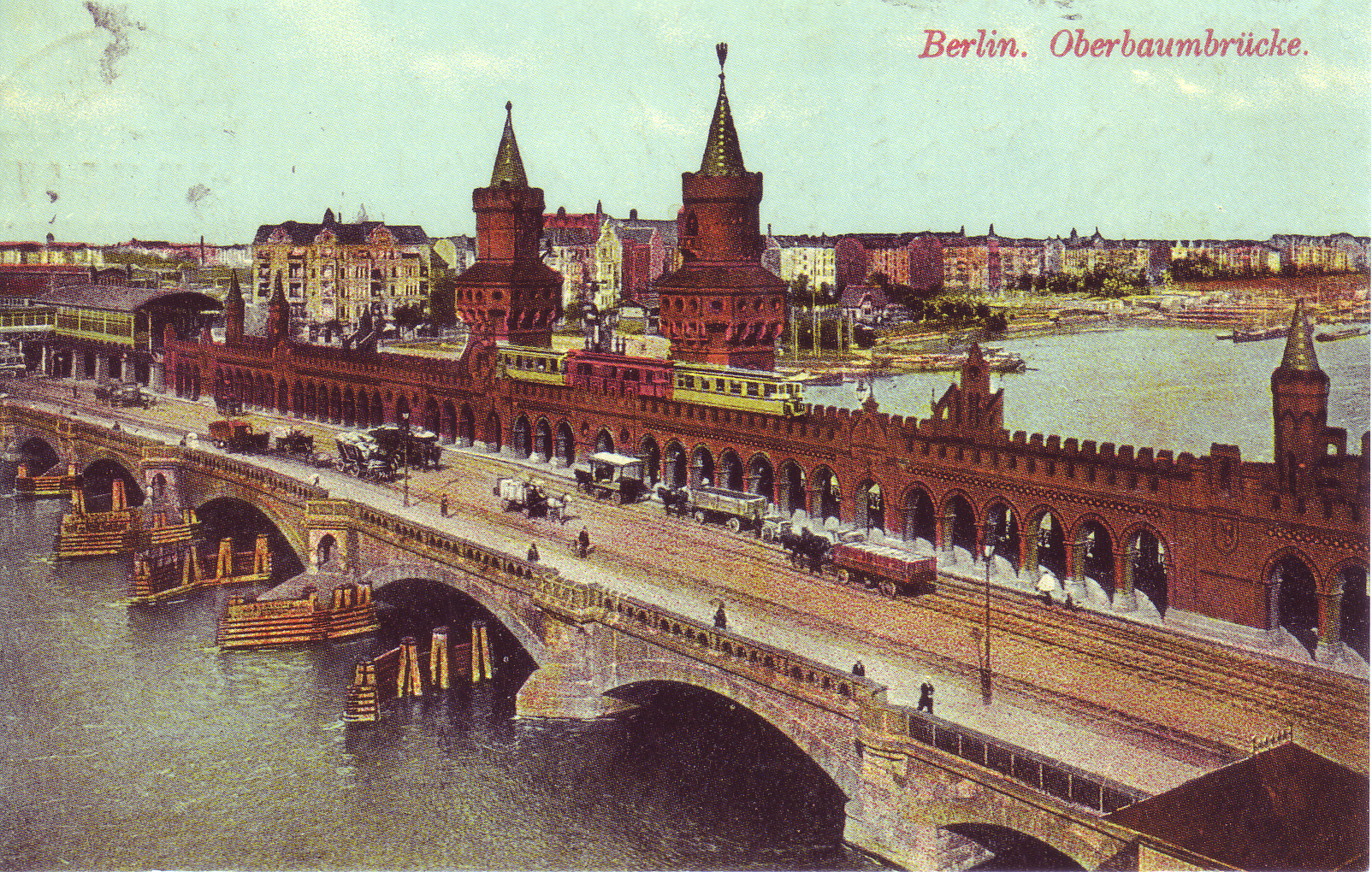
The Oberbaum Bridge and former U-Bahn railway station Stralauer Tor, c. 1900

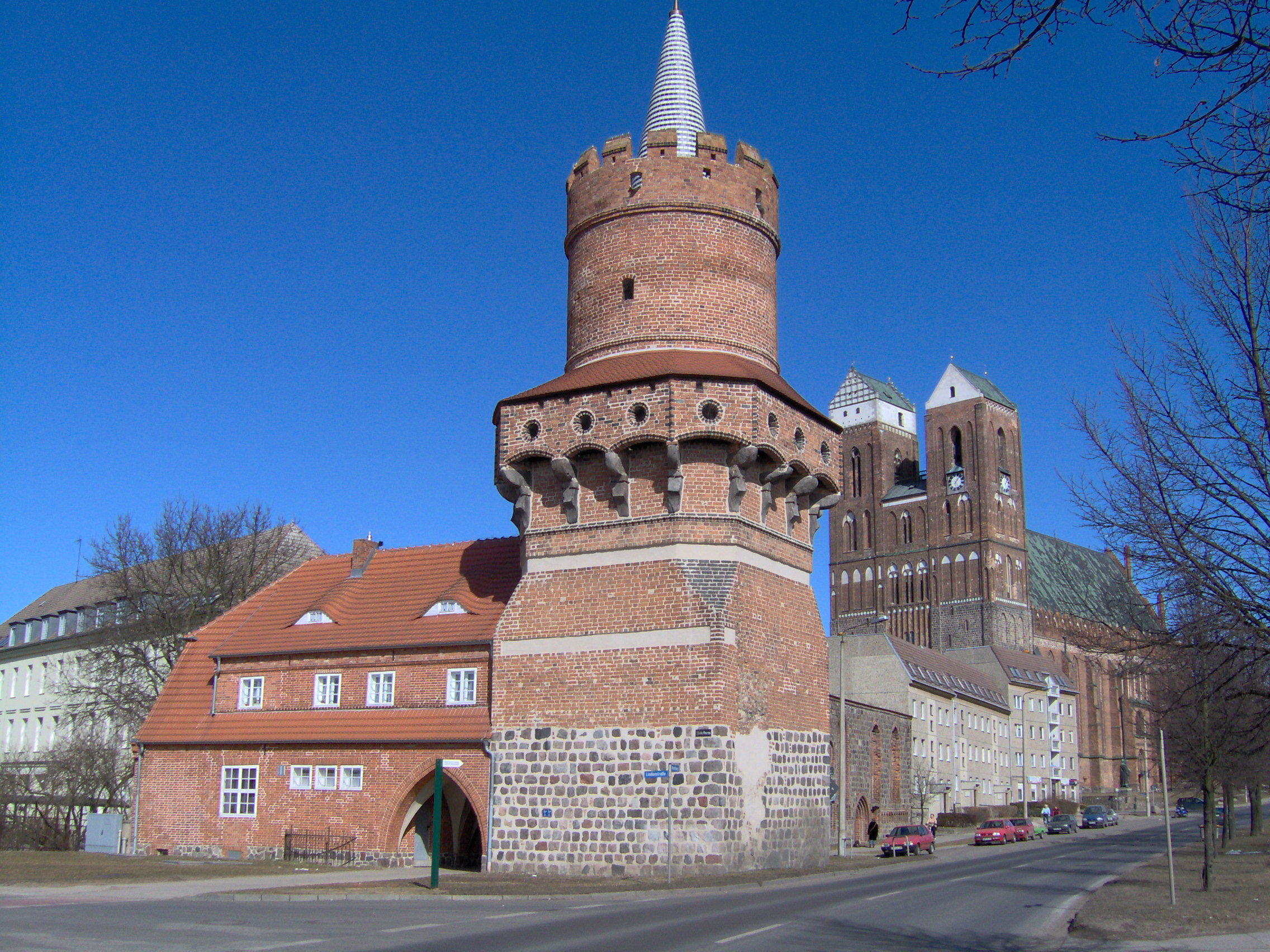
The towers were based on the Brick Gothic Mitteltorturm in Prenzlau

(video) A U-bahn subway train goes across the bridge on a cold day in December, 2014

The bridge is built on the former boundary of the municipal area with its rural environs, where an excise wall was built in 1732. A wooden drawbridge was built as part of the wall; it served as a gate to the city. The name Oberbaumbrücke stemmed from the heavy tree trunk, covered in metal spikes, that was used as a boom to block the river at night to prevent smuggling. (Baum means tree in German, but can also mean boom as in this case; thus the name means something like "Upper [Upstream] Boom Bridge"; there was another tree-trunk barrier at the western end of the contemporary city limits, close to today's Unterbaumstraße (lit. in English: Lower [Downstream] Boom Street.)

By 1879 the wooden bridge had been modified greatly. At 154 meters it was Berlin's longest, but was no longer adequate to the amount of traffic crossing it. Plans began to be drawn up for a new stone construction. The Siemens & Halske company, which was planning to build the Berlin U-Bahn (subway), insisted on a combined crossing for road vehicles, pedestrians, and the new rail line.

The new bridge opened in 1896 after two years of construction, in time for the Berlin Trades Exhibition. The architect and government official Otto Stahn (1859–1930) designed it in the North German Brick Gothic style of a city gate with many decorative elements, such as pointed arches, cross vaults, and coats of arms. The two towers were inspired by the Middle Gate Tower (Mitteltorturm) in the northern Brandenburg city of Prenzlau. Although purely cosmetic, they served as a reminder that the site was once Berlin's river gateway.

In 1902 the first segment of the U-Bahn opened. Its inaugural journey, carrying 19 passengers, ran from Stralauer Tor, at the eastern end of the bridge, to Potsdamer Platz. Stralauer Tor was dismantled after being damaged in a 1945 air raid, but its four sandstone-clad support posts can still be seen.

After Berlin absorbed several other municipalities in 1920, the Oberbaum Bridge became the crossing between the new boroughs of Friedrichshain and Kreuzberg. In April 1945 the Wehrmacht blew up the middle section of the bridge in an attempt to stop the Red Army from crossing it. After the war ended, Berlin was divided into four sectors. The Oberbaum Bridge crossed between the American and Soviet sectors. Until the mid-1950s, pedestrians, motor vehicles, and the city tramway could cross the bridge without difficulty.

=== Border crossing ===
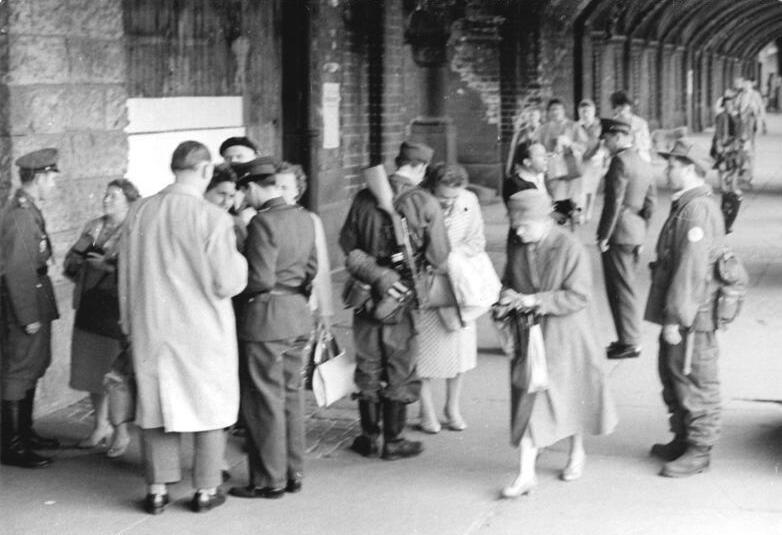
East German checkpoint at the Oberbaum Bridge, 1961.

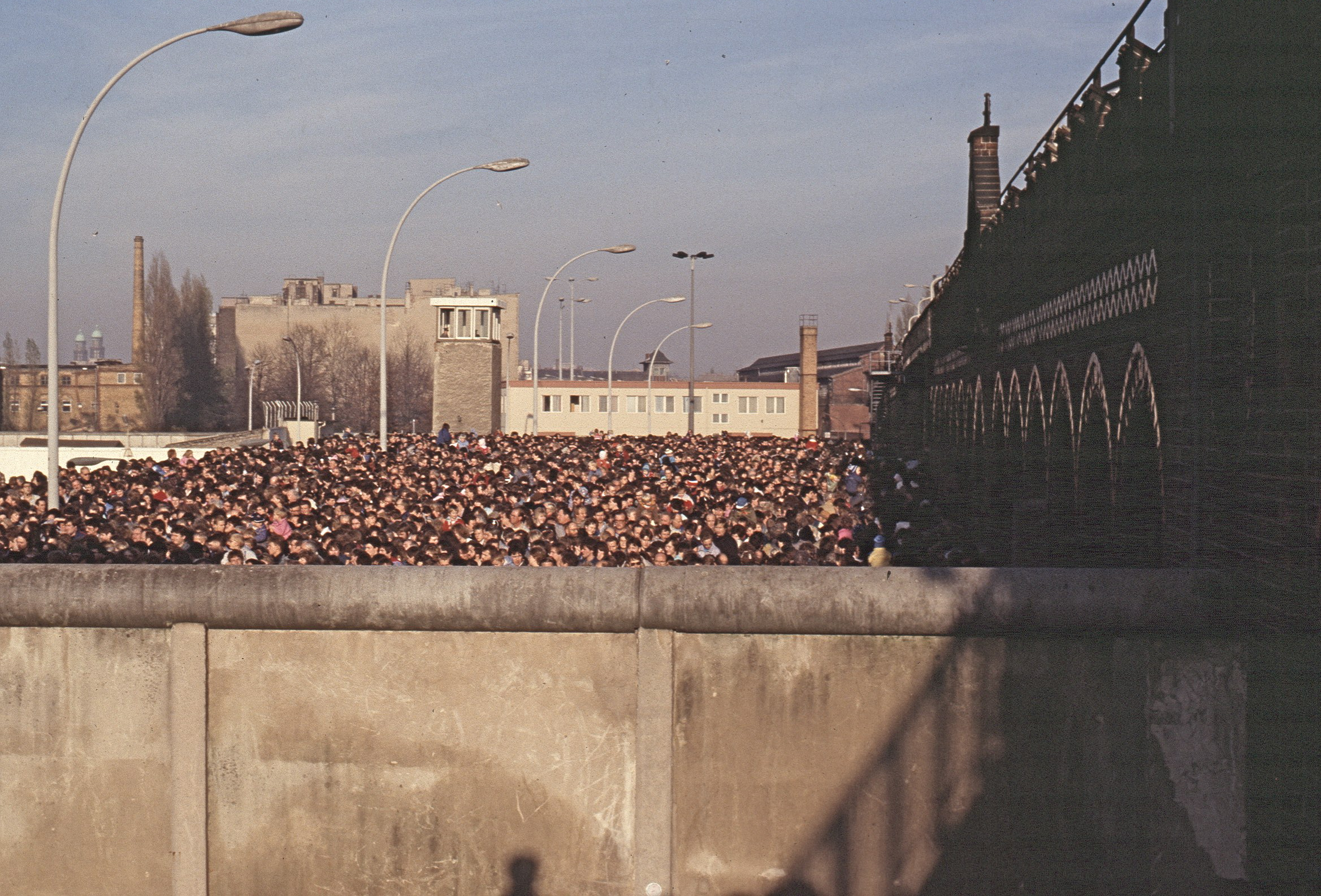
Crowds at Oberbaumbrücke after the breach of the Berlin Wall in November 1989.

When the Berlin Wall was built in 1961 the bridge became part of East Berlin's border with West Berlin; as all the waters of the River Spree were within the Friedrichshain limits, the East German fortifications extended up to the shoreline on the Kreuzberg side. As a result, the West Berlin U-Bahn line was forced to terminate at Schlesisches Tor. Beginning on 21 December 1963, the Oberbaum Bridge was used as a pedestrian border crossing for West Berlin residents only.

Three brief openings of the bridge occurred by the summer of 1966. A permanent opening for pedestrians came with the 1972 Four Power Agreement for Berlin. A building for the East Berlin control authorities was built directly on the eastern bank of the Spree, across the street from the Oberbaumbrücke. The part of the subway viaduct crossing the Stralauer Allee at the bridge was completely demolished. The towers were demolished in the 1970s. Since the border on the Kreuzberg shore (Gröbenufer) ran along the Spree, several children from Kreuzberg drowned on the Oberbaum bridge because rescue personnel from west side could not reach them, and this was prohibited from the east side. Responding to this an agreement on rescue operations if accidents in Berlin's border waters was signed on October 29, 1975. In 1976, an emergency call column was installed on the southern bridgehead, after whose activation drowning help was provided.

The coat of arms of the district Friedrichshain–Kreuzberg with the Oberbaumbrücke The Oberbaum Bridge, which formed part of the Friedrichshain coat of arms since 1991, was also included in the coat of arms of the new Berlin district of Friedrichshain–Kreuzberg after the district merger.

=== Post-Berlin Wall ===
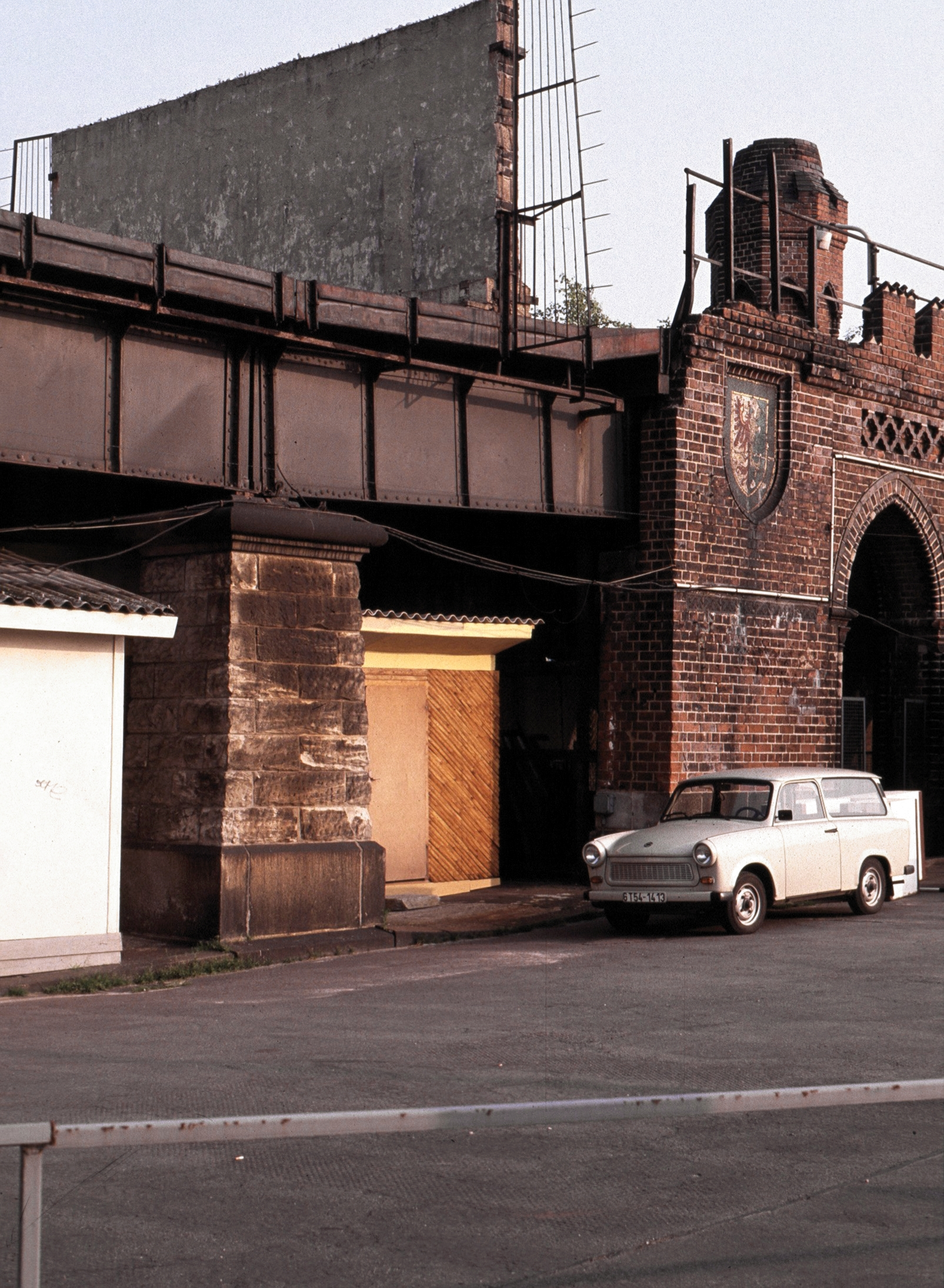
The U1 tracks at the end of Oberbaum Bridge in 1990, leading to the former Stralauer Tor station. The viaduct spans and blockade were demolished in January 1992 and the spans rebuilt for the reopening of the U1 line along the bridge in 1995.

After the removal of the Berlin Wall in 1989, and German reunification the following year, the bridge was rebuilt and restored to the former appearance, albeit with a new steel middle section designed by the Spanish architect Santiago Calatrava. Reconstruction began in January 1992, with the war-damaged parts of the bridge rebuilt. It opened to pedestrians and traffic on 9 November 1994, the fifth anniversary of the opening of the Berlin Wall. The U-Bahn line to Warschauer Straße station was reopened a year later.

Since 1997, a neon installation entitled "Stone – Paper – Scissors" by Thorsten Goldberg has adorned the bridge. Its two elements are engaged in a constant game of rock, paper, scissors, suggesting the arbitrariness of immigration decisions, both during the Cold War and for today's asylum seekers and poverty migrants.

Since the creation of the unified Friedrichshain-Kreuzberg borough in 2001, the Oberbaum Bridge no longer crosses a jurisdictional boundary.

In April 2019 the Oberbaum Bridge was blockaded as part of an international series of protests organised by Extinction Rebellion.

The bridge was used as the location for the defection of Karla to George Smiley and British intelligence in the book and mini series, Smiley's People.

== See also ==
- Media related to Bridges in Berlin at Wikimedia Commons
- List of bridges in Germany
- List of road-rail bridges
