= Görlitzer Bahnhof (Berlin U-Bahn) =

Station of the Berlin U-Bahn

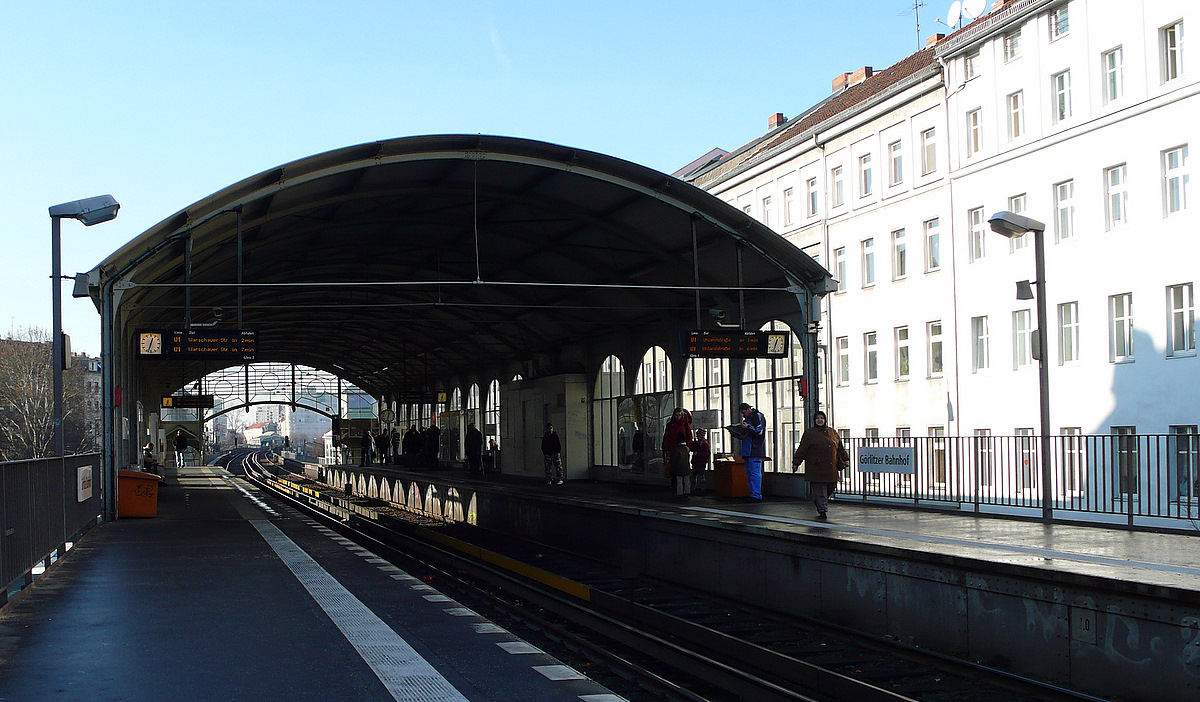

General information
- Location: Görlitzer Bahnhof; Kreuzberg, Berlin; Germany
- Coordinates: 52.499°N 13.428°E
- Owner: Berliner Verkehrsbetriebe
- Operator: Berliner Verkehrsbetriebe
- Platforms: 2 side platforms
- Tracks: 2
- Connections: : N1; : M29

Construction
- Structure type: Elevated
- Cycle facilities: Yes
- Accessible: No

Other information
- Fare zone: : Berlin A/5555

History
- Opened: 18 February 1902; 124 years ago

Services
Preceding station	Berlin U-Bahn	Following station
Kottbusser Tor towards Uhlandstraße	U1	Schlesisches Tor towards Warschauer Straße
Kottbusser Tor towards Krumme Lanke	U3	Schlesisches Tor towards Warschauer Straße
Route map
Location
- Location within Berlin

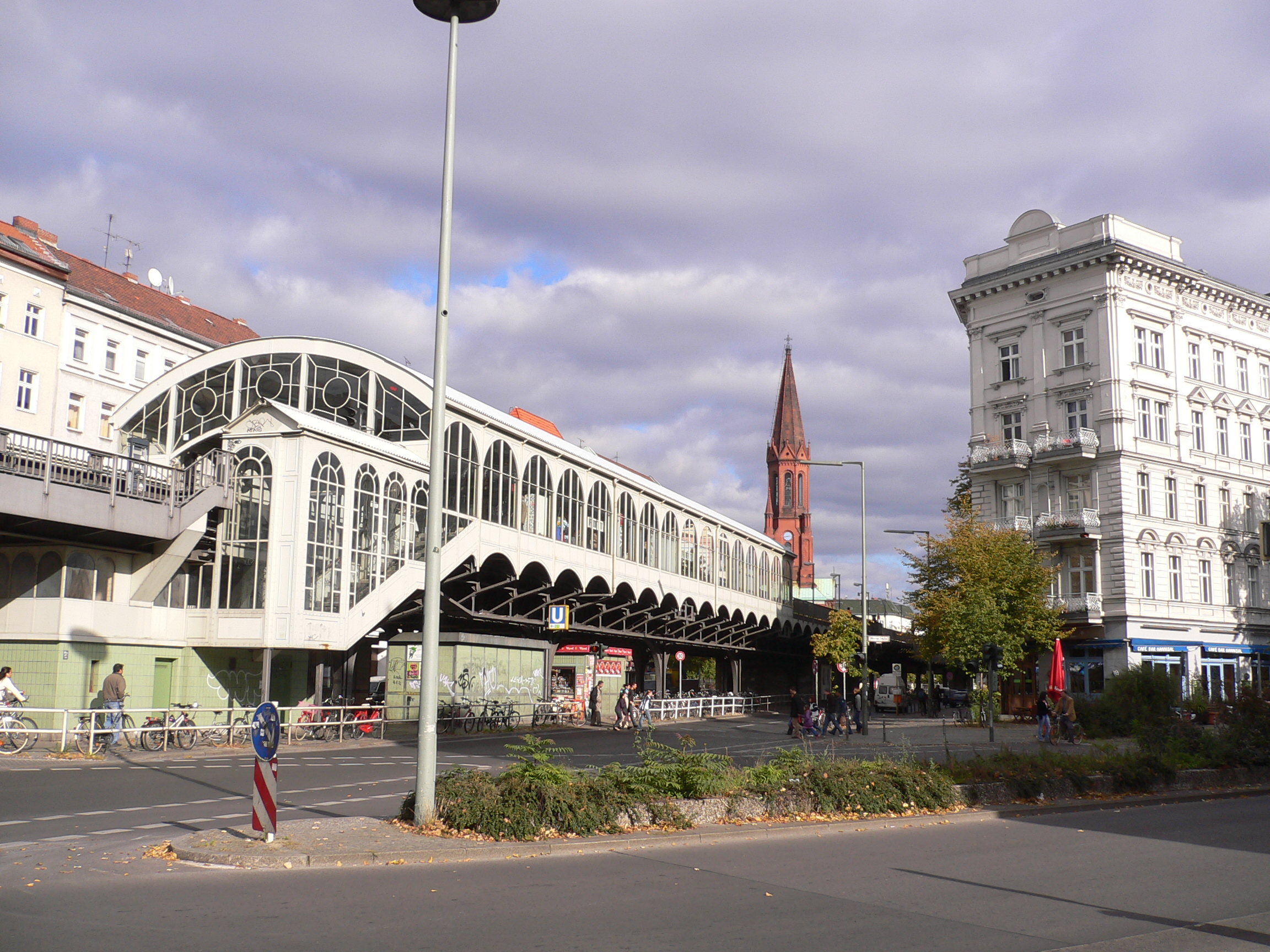
Görlitzer Bahnhof station, seen from Wiener Straße

Görlitzer Bahnhof is a Berlin U-Bahn station on the viaduct of lines U1 and U3.

It is located in Kreuzberg, in an area that offers a wide range of nightlife but is also notorious for its riots on 1 May 1987.

== History ==
The station, designed by the Siemens & Halske company, opened on 18 February 1902 under the name of Oranienstraße and is still preserved in its original condition. In 1926, it was named after the nearby Görlitzer Bahnhof, one of Berlin's pre-war railway termini where southeastbound trains departed.

On 8 February 1945, the eastern parts of the section were completely destroyed. On 18 March 1945, there was heavy damage to the track area.

On 30 April 1951 Görlitzer Bahnhof was closed to passengers and in 1987 closed for freight. The name Görlitzer Bahnhof today is only used by the U-Bahn station.

In 1981, it was renovated.
