= Matrix (club) =

Coordinates: 52°30′16″N 13°26′56″E

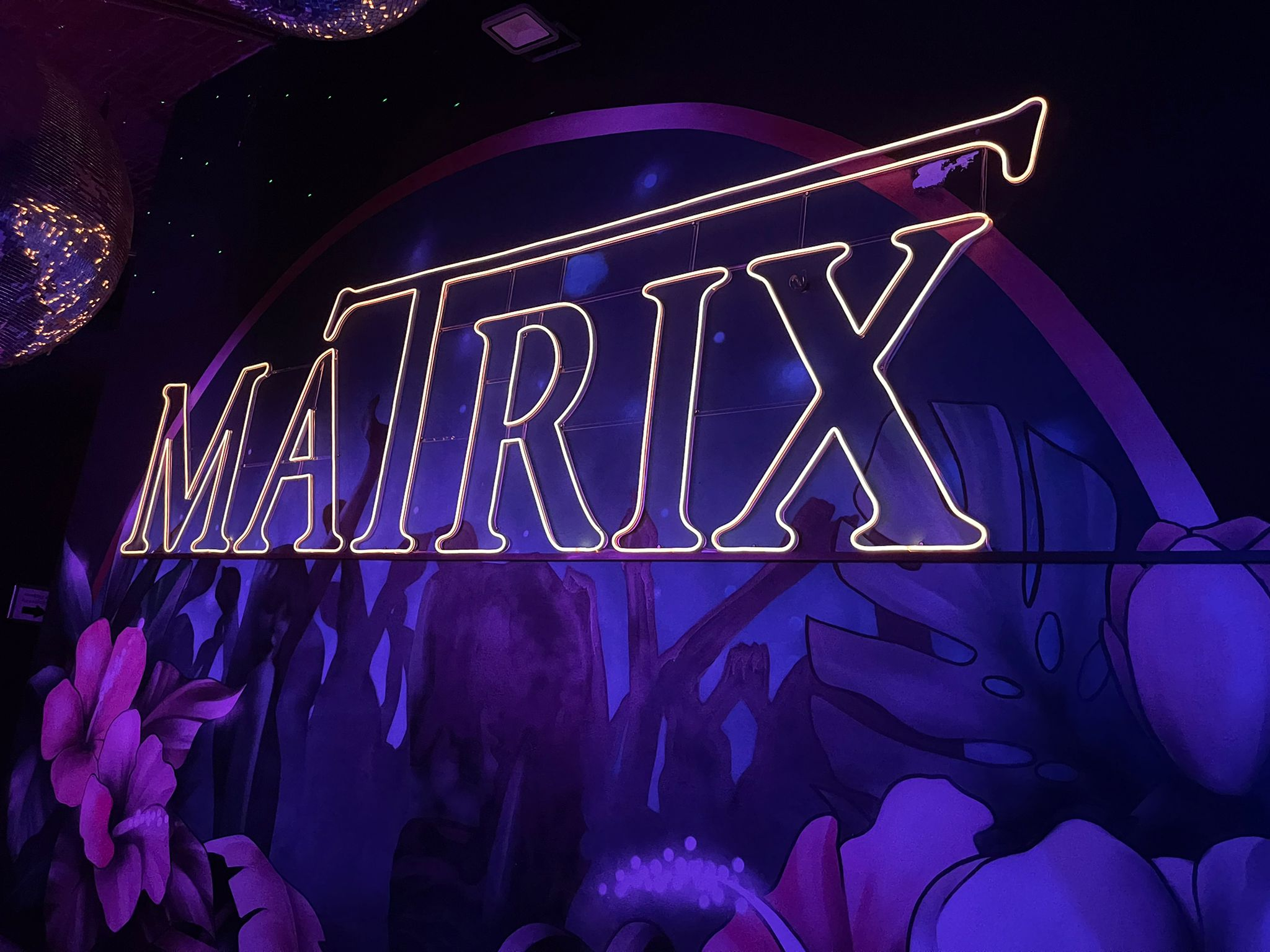
Logo of the Matrix inside the club

Matrix is a nightclub in Berlin which opened in 1996. The large-scale discothèque is located at Warschauer Platz 18 in ten basement vaults of the Warschauer Straße railway station. It houses up to nine bars and five dance floors, as well as an outdoor area. The venue has an overall size of 2,100 square meters, and is one of the biggest nightclubs in Berlin. In Germany, the club is known as one of the filming locations of the soap opera Berlin – Tag & Nacht of the channel RTL 2.

Between 1996 and 2002 many international DJs of the electronic dance music scene such as Marusha, Chris Isaac, Westbam, Underground Resistance, Josh Wink, Lords of the Underground, Lady B, Sven Väth, Paul van Dyk performed at the club. The club also had its own truck at the Berlin Love Parade.

Since 2003 the program of the club has been expanded, since then chart music is also played at the venue. Artists who have performed at the Matrix include Sabrina Setlur, Ne-Yo, George Morel, Vibe Kingz, DJ Size and others.
