= Stralauer Tor station =

Subway station in Berlin, Germany

Coordinates: 52.503°N 13.447°E

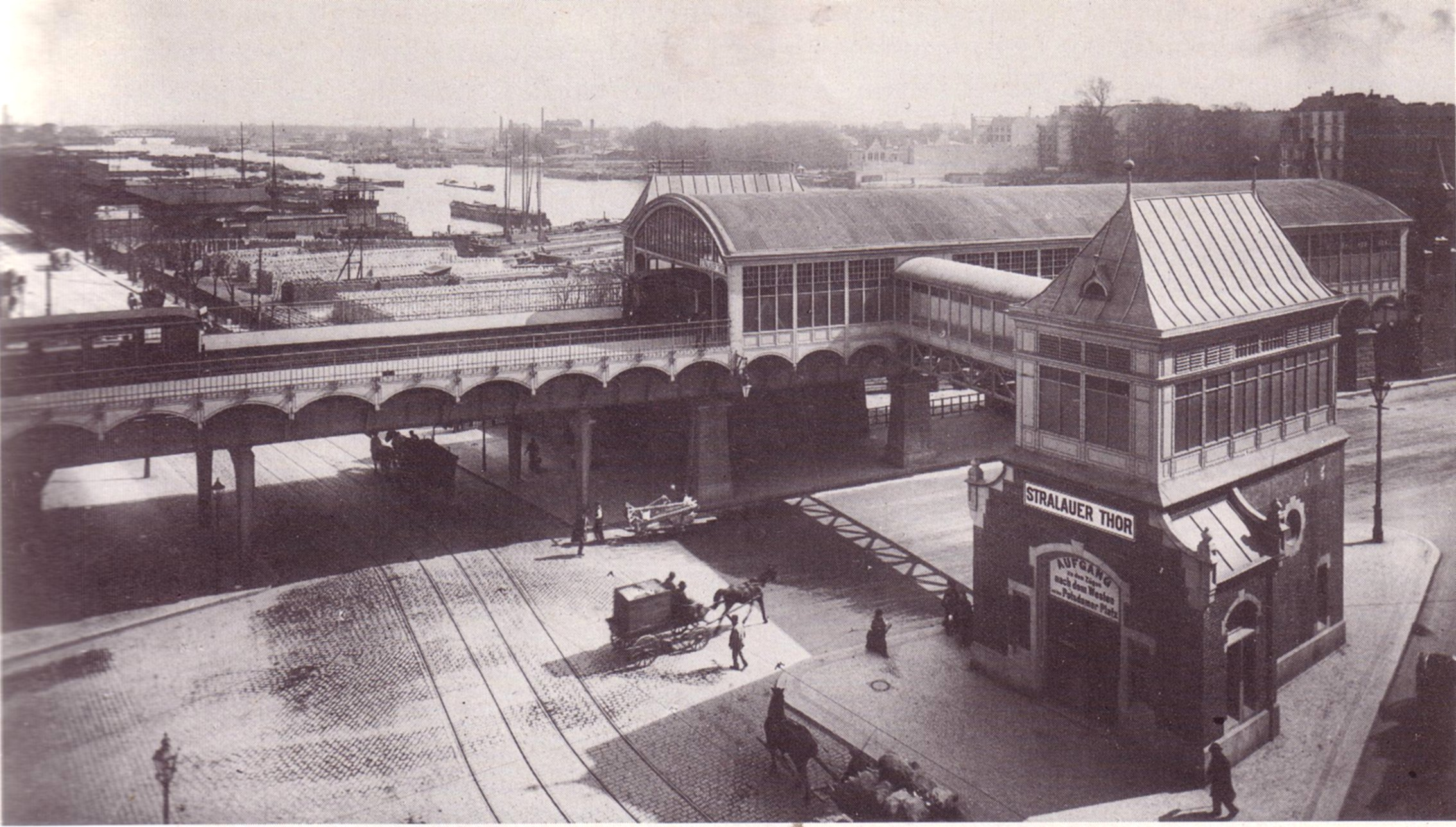
The station at the time of its opening, with the River Spree visible behind it

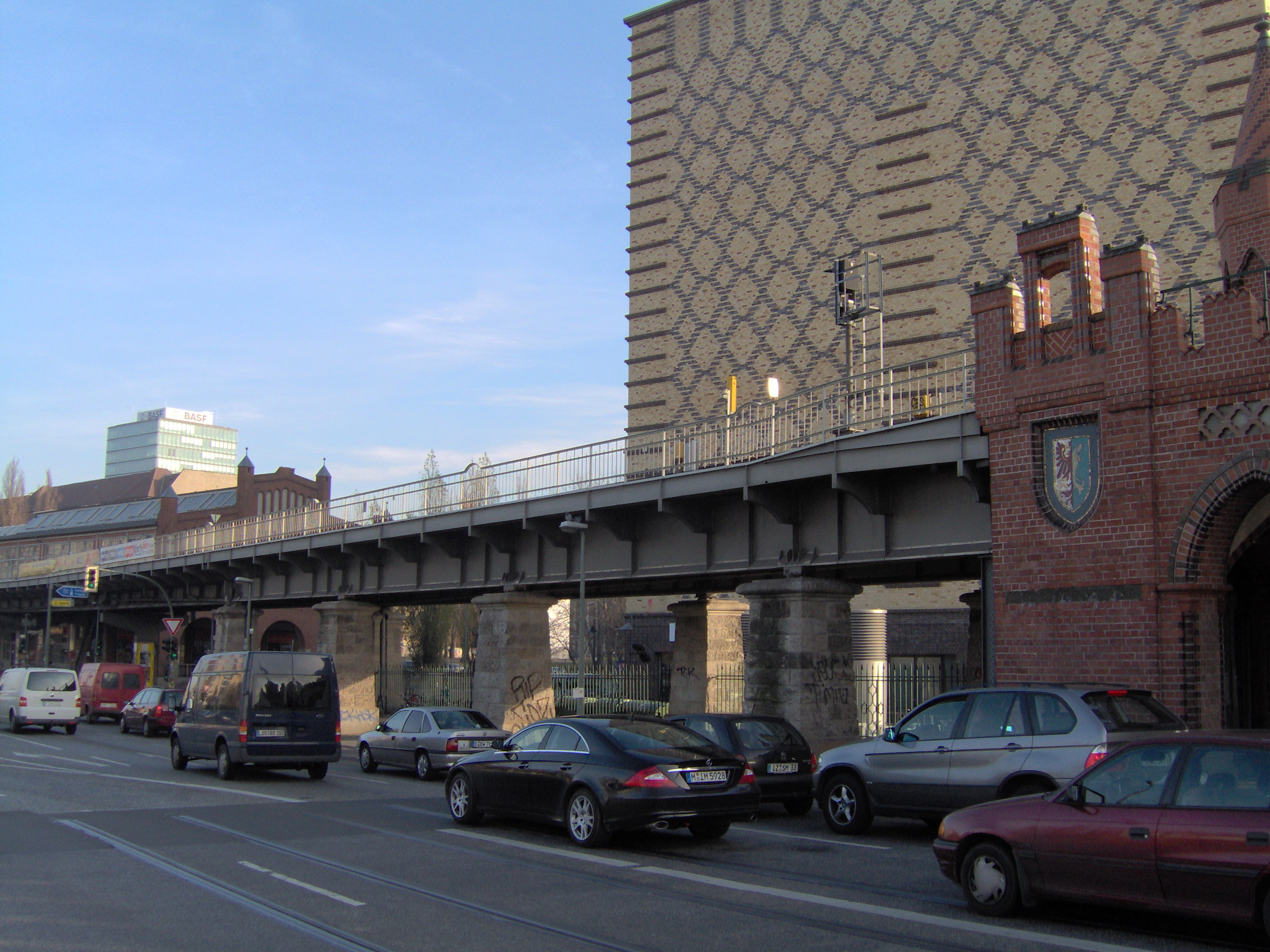
The location of the former station in 2006, with the Oberbaumbrücke on the right

Stralauer Tor (Osthafen as of 1924) was a Berlin U-Bahn station in Berlin-Friedrichshain. It operated between Warschauer Straße and Schlesisches Tor stations on today's U1. Following its destruction in World War II it was never rebuilt and is one of three Berlin U-Bahn stations (the others being Nürnberger Platz, which was closed and demolished in 1961 and Französische Straße, which was closed in 2020) to have been abandoned after having previously been in service.

== History ==
Stralauer Tor was an elevated station built into the north-eastern part of the Oberbaumbrücke viaduct, which featured a barrel-shaped roof and two street level stairwell entrances accommodating opposing platform sides. It was constructed by German engineering company Siemens & Halske. The groundbreaking ceremony held on 10 September 1896 effectively laid one of the foundation stones of today's U-Bahn network, given the new elevated station would mark the eastern end of the city's very first elevated and subterranean electric train line – the western end terminated at Potsdamer Platz. However, although its historic status remains intact, its role as line terminus would be short-lived; six months after the station opened to the public on 15 February 1902, the present terminus Warschauer Straße (then named Warschauer Brücke) assumed the role, opening for service on 17 August 1902.

The design of Stralauer Tor astride the north-eastern end of the Oberbaumbrücke was conceived before the bridge was built. The construction of both edifices took place consecutively; once Otto Stahn had directed the erection of the bridge between 1894 and 1896, the engineering firm set about integrating their new station into the viaduct design.

Stralauer Tor was renamed Osthafen in 1924 to indicate its proximity to the city's Eastern port, which was situated alongside the Oberbaumbrücke on the northern bank of the river Spree.

On 10 March 1945, during the final stages of World War II, the station suffered severe bombing damage. Although some consideration was given to rebuild it after the war – to the extent that it appears on a 1946 Berlin map under a new name, Bersarinstraße – construction was never started, and so the station never reopened. The reasons for this were that it had become unnecessary, Warschauer Straße station was only 320 metres away and the destruction of many buildings around the Stralauer Tor during the war had reduced potential passenger footfall. However, more significant for its long-term prospects, it was situated on the border between the Soviet and American sectors of occupation. Those would later divide the city into East- and West Berlin.

The construction of the Berlin Wall along this frontier in 1961 led to the section of the U1 that traversed the Oberbaumbrücke into East Berlin being abandoned, and the remainder of the line instead terminating prematurely at Schlesisches Tor, the last station within West Berlin. Following German reunification, the line's eastern end reopened in 1995, but Stralauer Tor was not reconstructed. Today, only struts on the viaduct remain to indicate its former location.

Preceding station	Berlin U-Bahn	Following station
Arrangement 1902–1945
Schlesisches Tor towards Uhlandstraße	U1	Warschauer Straße Terminus
