= Schlesisches Tor station =

Station of the Berlin U-Bahn

Schlesisches Tor
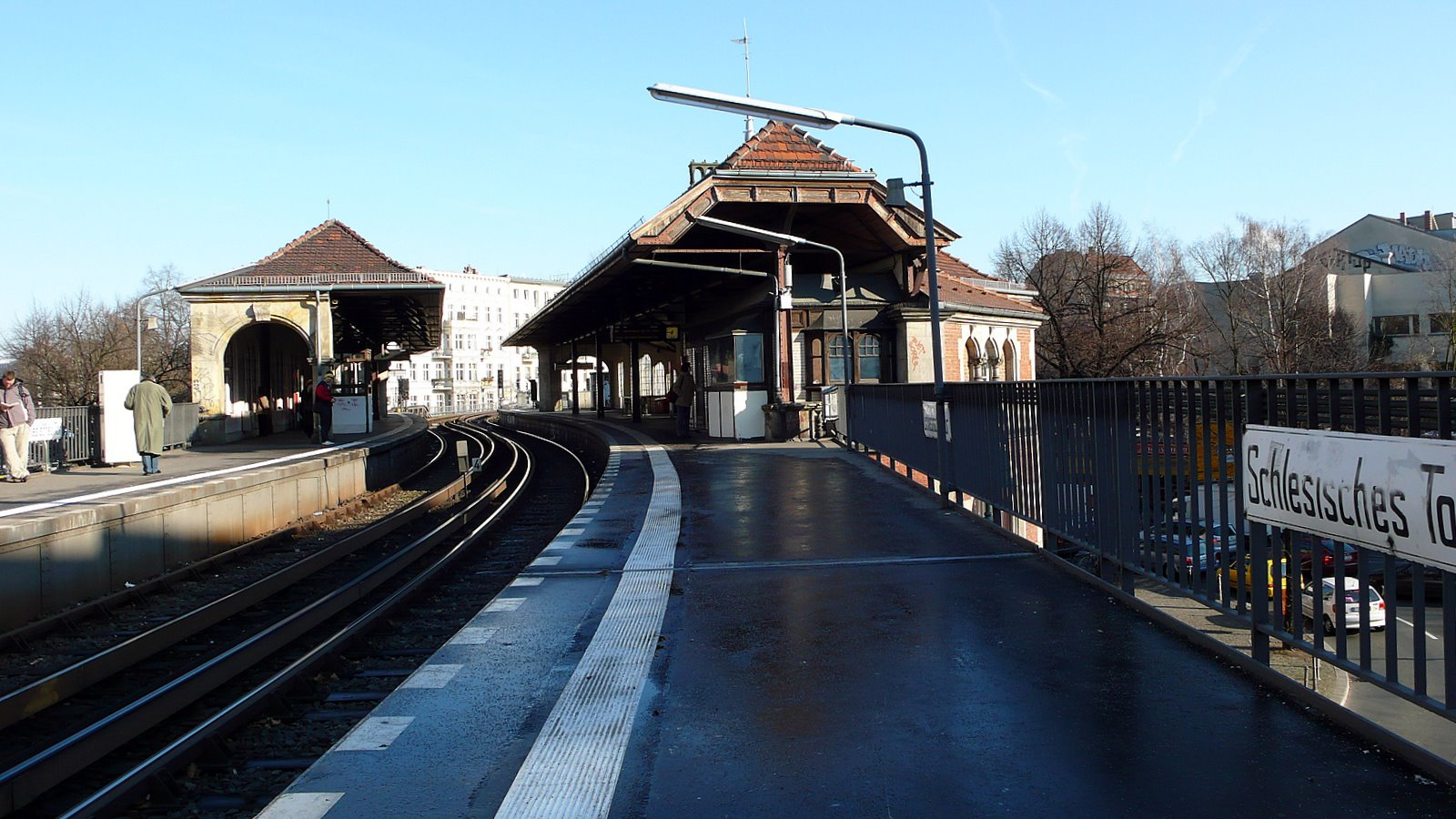

General information
- Location: Schlesisches Tor; Kreuzberg, Berlin; Germany
- Coordinates: 52°30′03″N 13°26′30″E
- Owner: Berliner Verkehrsbetriebe
- Operator: Berliner Verkehrsbetriebe
- Platforms: 2 side platforms
- Tracks: 2
- Connections: : 165, 265, N1, N60, N65

Construction
- Structure type: Elevated
- Cycle facilities: Yes
- Accessible: No

Other information
- Fare zone: : Berlin A/5555

History
- Opened: 18 February 1902; 124 years ago

Services
Preceding station	Berlin U-Bahn	Following station
Görlitzer Bahnhof towards Uhlandstraße	U1	Warschauer Straße Terminus
Görlitzer Bahnhof towards Krumme Lanke	U3	Warschauer Straße Terminus
Arrangement 1961-1995
Görlitzer Bahnhof towards Uhlandstraße	U1	Terminus
Arrangement 1902-1945
Görlitzer Bahnhof towards Uhlandstraße	U1	Stralauer Tor towards Warschauer Straße
Route map
Location
- Location within Berlin

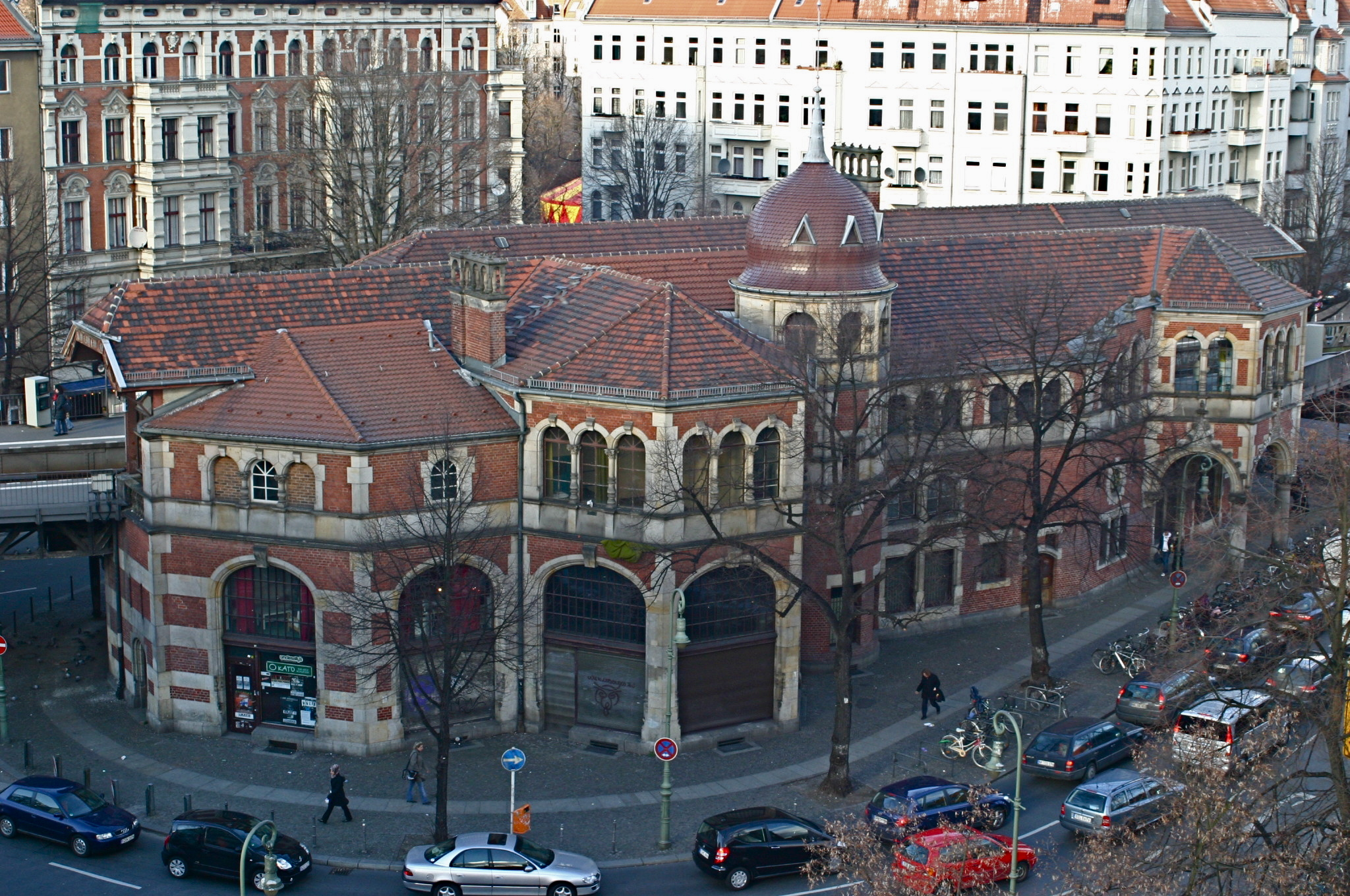
The station in February 2008

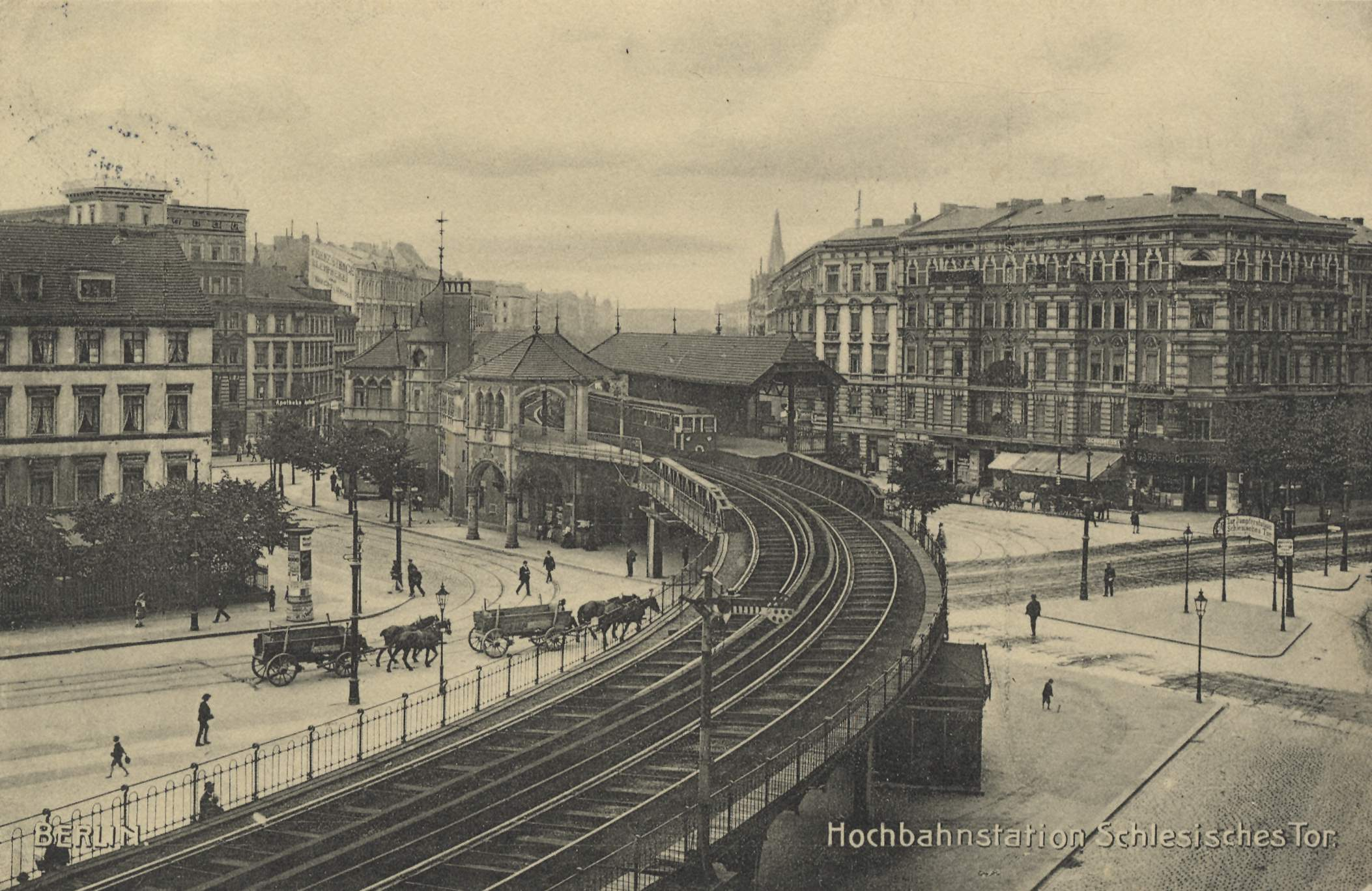
The station in about 1911

Schlesisches Tor is a Berlin U-Bahn station on lines U1 and U3. Many Berliners use the affectionate term Schlesi (see Berlin dialect).

== Overview ==
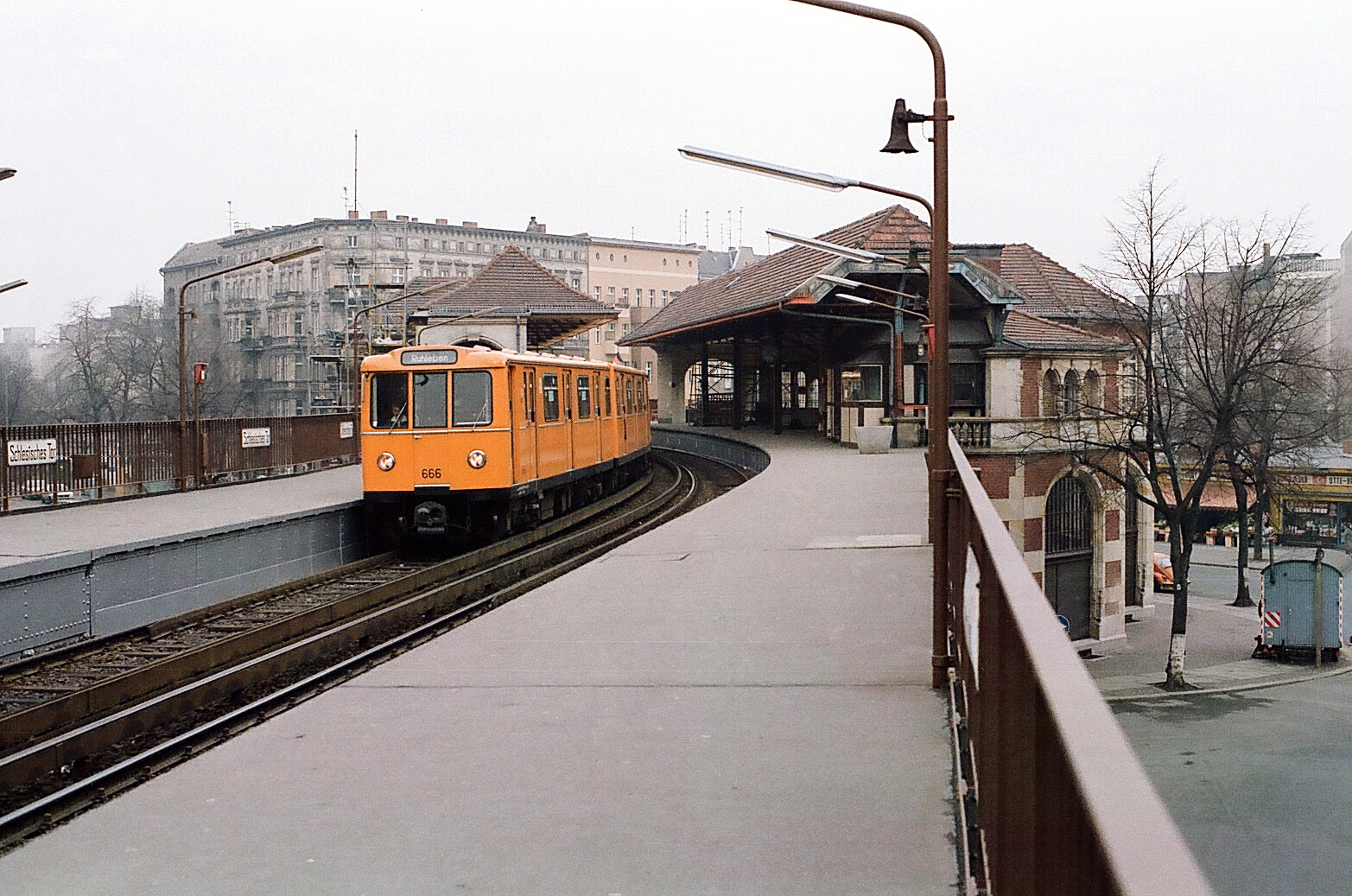
The platform level of the station, in 1984

The station is located in eastern Kreuzberg, near Oberbaumbrücke, in the Bohemian quarter commonly known as SO36 (named after its former postal code). The station is named after one of the former city gates of Berlin, built in the early 18th century; the road that ran through it led southeastward to the province of Silesia.

The exceptionally richly designed station opened on 18 February 1902, on the first U-Bahn line erected by the Siemens & Halske company (the Stammstrecke). On 11/12 March 1945, this station was directly hit, and the track area was severely damaged. During the division of Berlin after 13 August 1961, the station was the eastern terminus of the U1, as the final station, Warschauer Straße, was in East Berlin. The link was reopened in 1995. An intermediate station at the Spree river, Stralauer Tor, had been destroyed in 1945 and never reopened.

Schlesisches Tor was an atmospheric location in the 1966 espionage film The Quiller Memorandum, starring George Segal and Alec Guinness.
