= Augsburger Straße station =

Station of the Berlin U-Bahn

Coordinates: 52°30′02″N 13°20′12″E

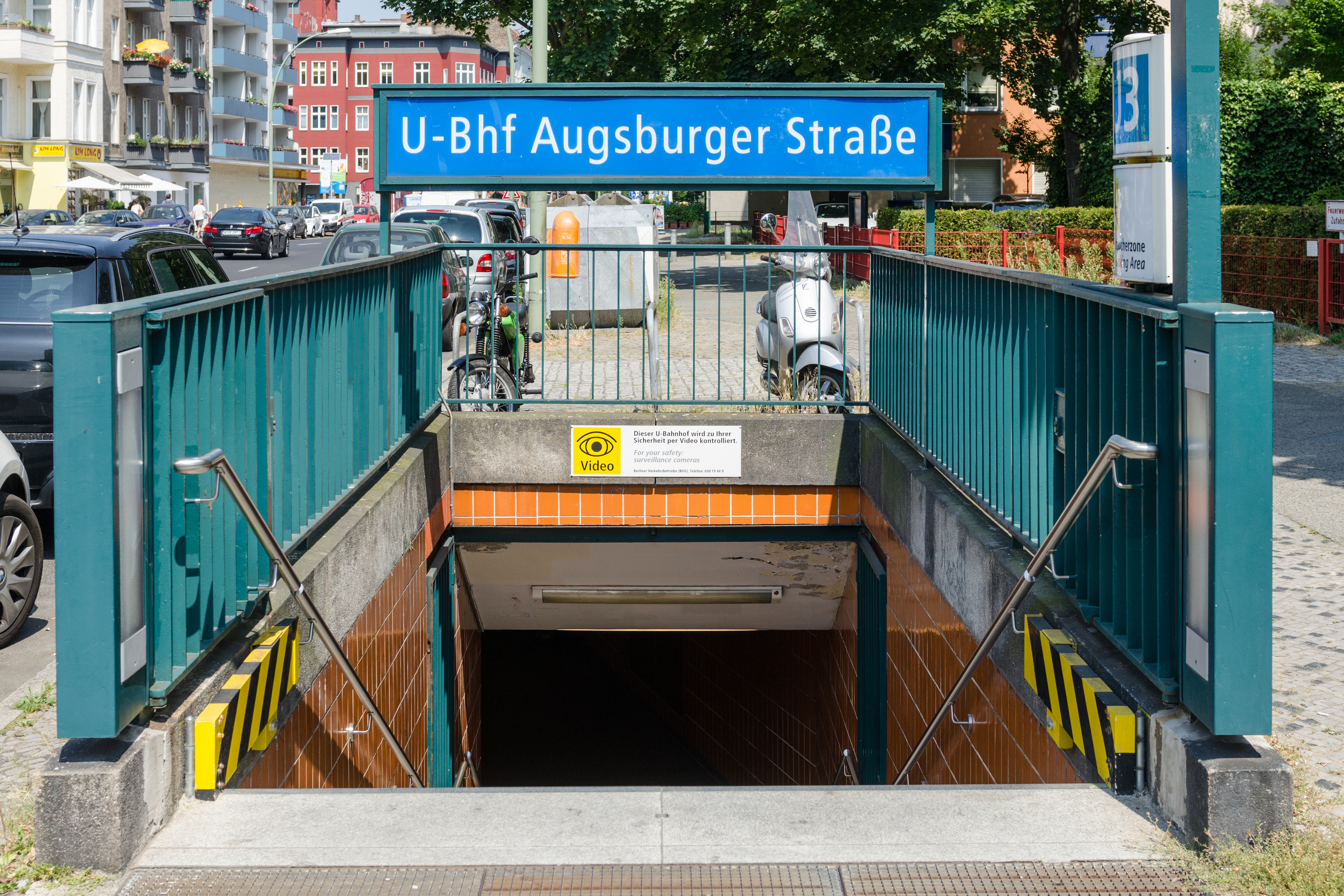
One of the entries to the station

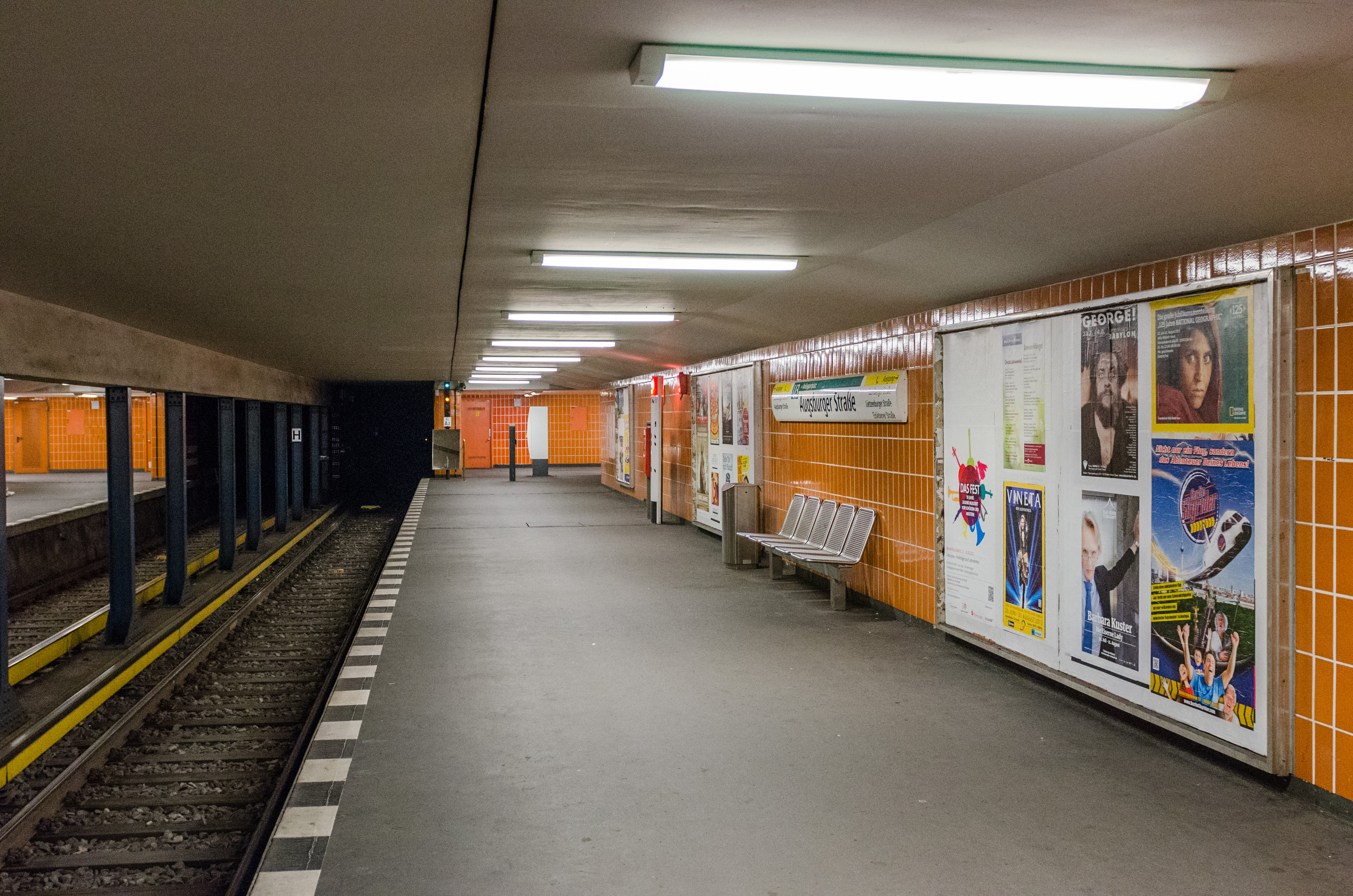
Platform of the station

Augsburger Straße is a Berlin U-Bahn station on the U3 line. It is located in Charlottenburg under Nürnberger Straße where Augsburger Straße crosses it. The station and street are named after the city of Augsburg.

Augsburger Straße station was built in 1960/61 and opened on 8 May 1961, after the replacement of the Nürnberger Platz station by the new Spichernstraße interchange with the U9 line left too great a distance between stations for city centre service. It is 491 m north of the Spichernstraße station and 615 m south of Wittenbergplatz.

The station has two side platforms with exits at each end and a passenger tunnel under the tracks. The walls are tiled in dark orange or "red-brown". As at Spichernstraße, there is a drop ceiling which causes a powerful draught. There are only stairs at the exits, thus this station is inaccessible to people with mobility problems.

Preceding station	Berlin U-Bahn	Following station
Spichernstraße towards Krumme Lanke	U3	Wittenbergplatz towards Warschauer Straße
Arrangement before closure of Nürnberger Platz
Hohenzollernplatz towards Krumme Lanke	U3	Nürnberger Platz towards Warschauer Straße
