= Nürnberger Platz station =

Station of the Berlin U-Bahn

Coordinates: 52°29′54″N 13°20′3″E

Nürnberger Platz was a Berlin U-Bahn station on what is now the U3, located under the square of the same name in Wilmersdorf on the border with Charlottenburg. The station opened on 12 October 1913 and was permanently closed on 1 June 1959.

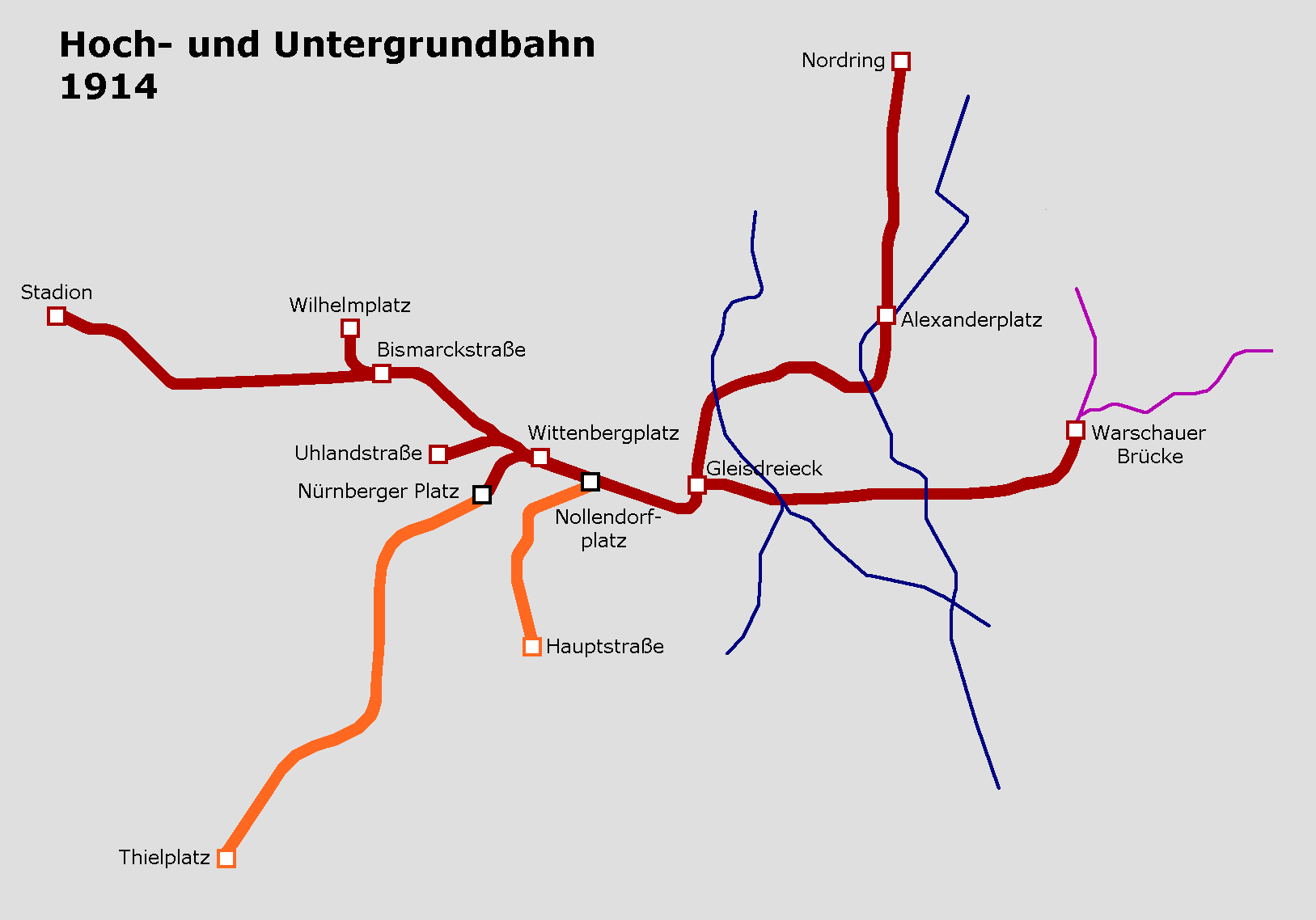
Berlin U-Bahn system in 1914

== Overview ==
Nürnberger Platz was the first station south of Wittenbergplatz on the Wilmersdorf-Dahlem U-Bahn, which was built branching off the original U-Bahn line, the Stammstrecke. The stretch of line to Nürnberger Platz, and that station, fell within the borders of Charlottenburg and was paid for by the Hochbahngesellschaft, the operators of the existing U-Bahn; the remainder of the line was paid for by Wilmersdorf, then a developing settlement independent of Berlin. The station was therefore designed by Alfred Grenander and resembled that at Uhlandstraße, built at about the same time. It had a centre platform with entrances at each end, oval station name plaques with green borders, and steel columns supporting the roof over the platform. However, the north entrance, like the rest of the extension, was designed by the Wilmersdorf architect Wilhelm Leitgebel, who gave it a stone enclosure in keeping with the prestige blocks of flats around the square. By the 1920s this had already been replaced by a simple steel structure.

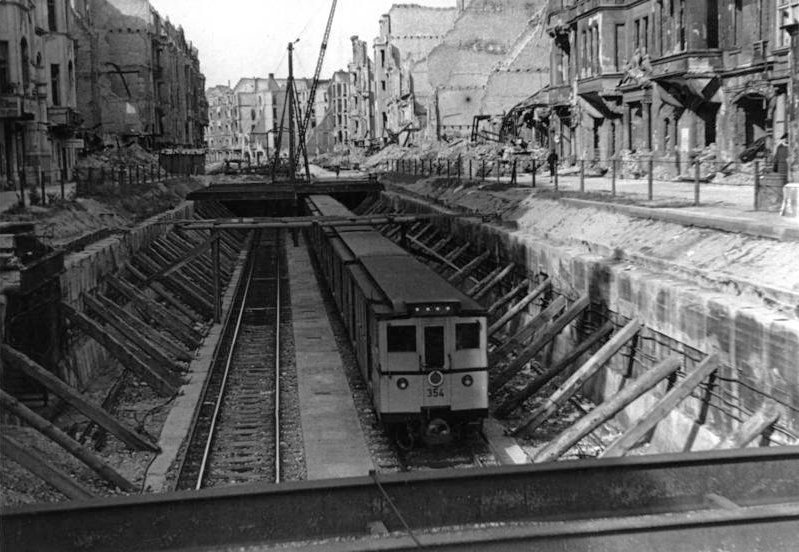
Train running in open shaft created by bomb damage near Nürnberger Platz, 1946

The area around the station was so severely damaged by World War II bombing that it was completely cleared on the 23/24 August 1943 and 28/29 January 1944. The station was repaired and returned to service, but when the G Line (today U9) was built in the 1950s, an interchange station was built at Spichernstraße, using the shunting and turnaround area of Nürnberger Platz, and the Nürnberger Platz station, only one or two hundred metres to the north, closed the day before it opened on 2 June 1959. However, the 1100 m between Spichernstraße and Wittenbergplatz was judged to be too great a distance for city centre stations, so a new station, Augsburger Straße, was opened between them in 1961.

Nothing remains of the Nürnberger Platz station; the site is now itself used for a shunting and turnaround area.

Preceding station	Berlin U-Bahn	Following station
Arrangement before closure of Nürnberger Platz
Augsburger Straße towards Krumme Lanke	U3	Wittenbergplatz towards Warschauer Straße
