= U12 =

U12 may refer to:

== Submarines ==
- German submarine U-12, various vessels
- SM U-12 (Austria-Hungary), a submarine of the Austro-Hungarian Navy

== Other uses ==
- U12 (Berlin U-Bahn), a former railway line
- "U12" (song), a 2015 song by Daya
- Nissan Bluebird (U12), a Japanese sedan
- Nissan Pintara (U12), a Japanese sedan
- Snub cube
- U12 Consortium, a university alliance in Taiwan
- U12 minor spliceosomal RNA
- Udet U 12 Flamingo, a German biplane
- BMW X1 (U12), a German crossover exclusively sold in China
- Under-12, an age classification in many youth sports
