= Hohenzollernplatz =

Hohenzollernplatz may refer to:

- Hohenzollernplatz (Berlin U-Bahn)
- Hohenzollernplatz (Munich U-Bahn)
