= Kurfürstendamm station =

Station of the Berlin U-Bahn

Kurfürstendamm
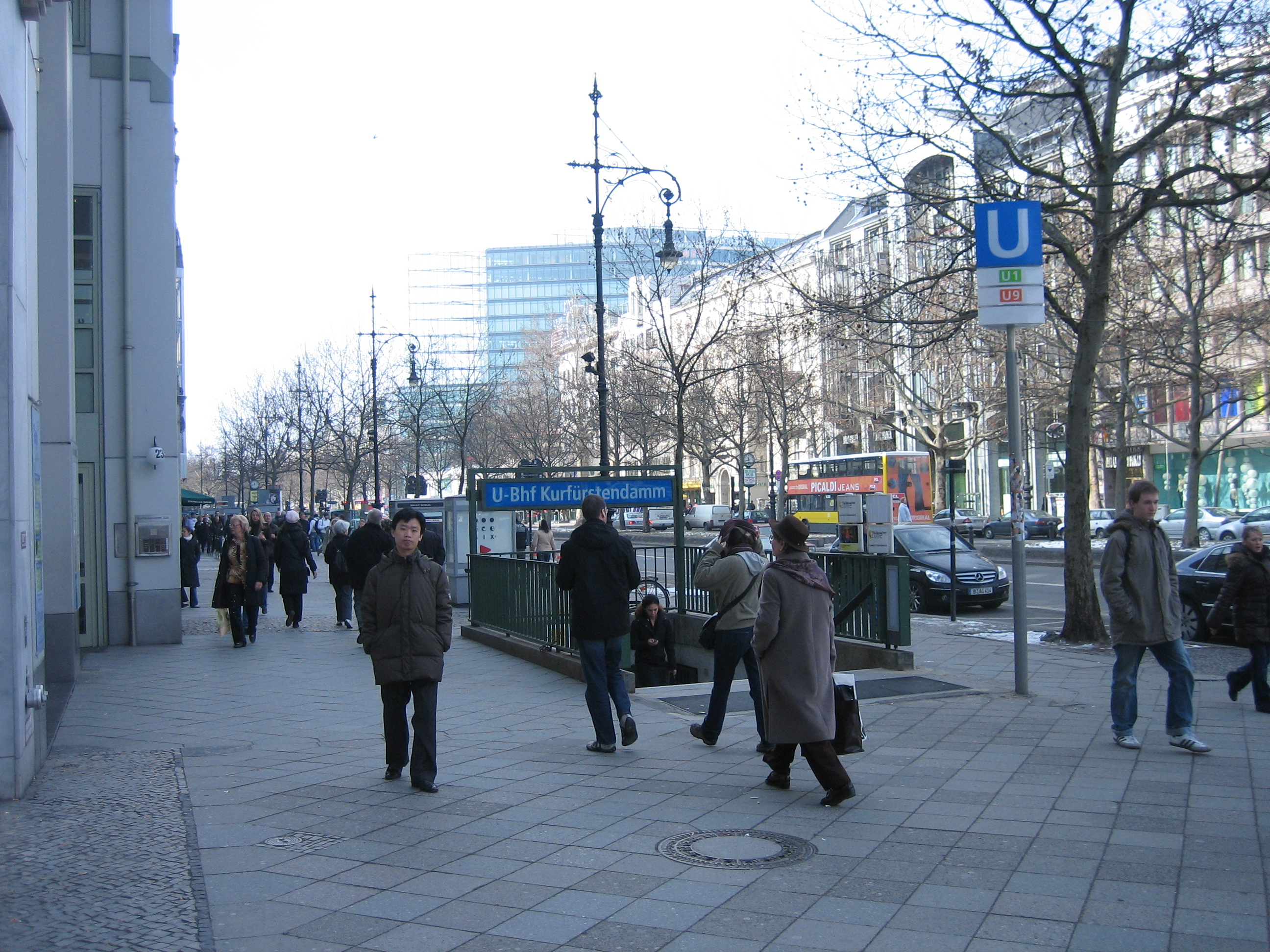
- Eastern entrance to U1 platform

General information
- Location: Kurfürstendamm/Joachimsthaler Straße; Charlottenburg, Berlin; Germany
- Coordinates: 52°30′15″N 13°19′58″E
- Owner: Berliner Verkehrsbetriebe
- Operator: Berliner Verkehrsbetriebe
- Platforms: 2 side platforms (U1); 1 island platform (U9)
- Tracks: 4 (2 on each level)
- Connections: : 109, 110, 204, 249, X10, N1, N2, N3, N9, N10, N26; : M19, M29, M46

Construction
- Structure type: Underground
- Cycle facilities: Yes
- Accessible: Yes

Other information
- Fare zone: : Berlin A/5555

History
- Opened: 28 August 1961; 65 years ago

Services
Preceding station	Berlin U-Bahn	Following station
Uhlandstraße Terminus	U1	Wittenbergplatz towards Warschauer Straße
Spichernstraße towards Rathaus Steglitz	U9	Zoologischer Garten towards Osloer Straße
Route map
Location
- Location within Berlin Location within Germany Location within Europe

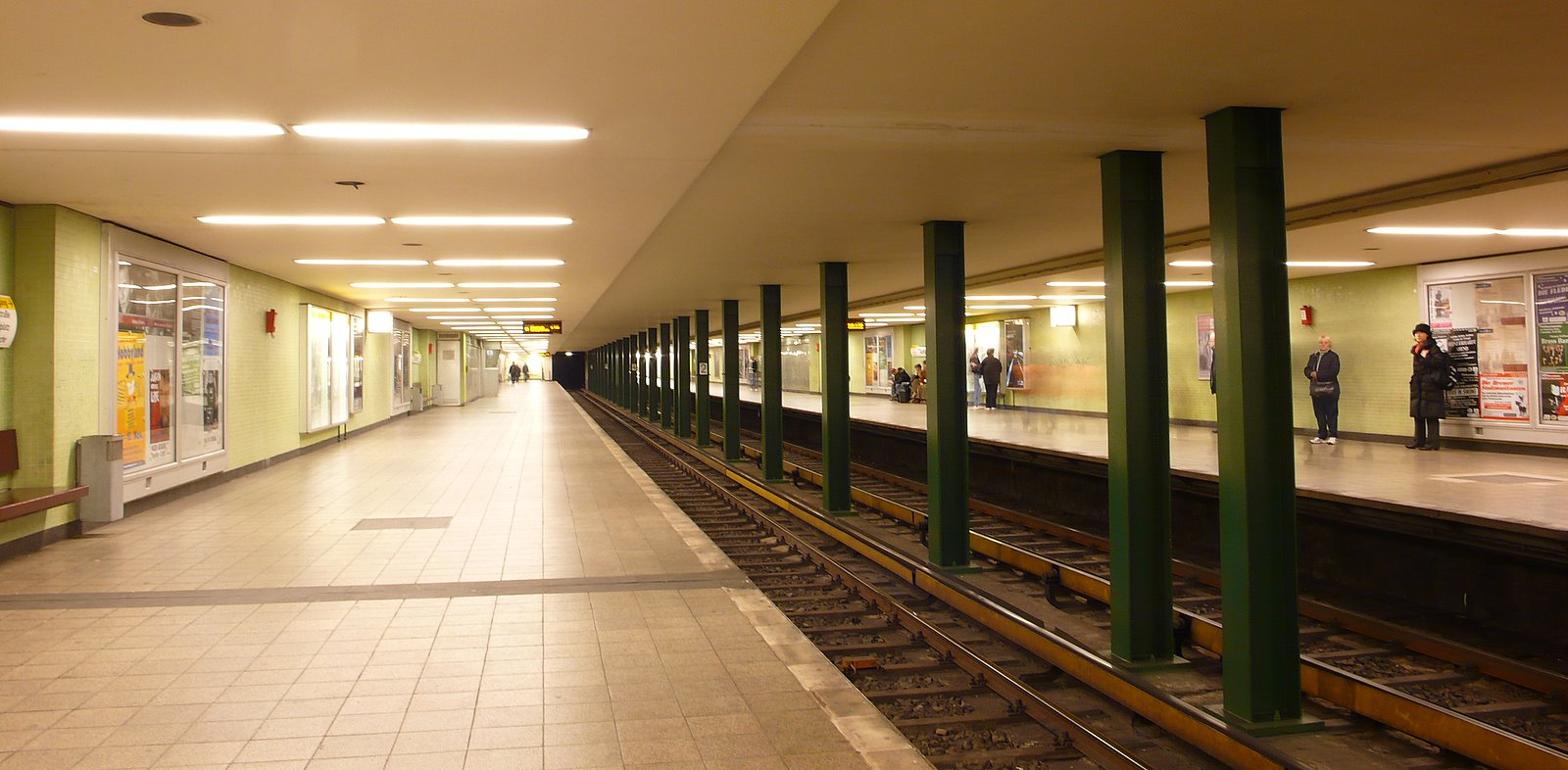
U1 platforms

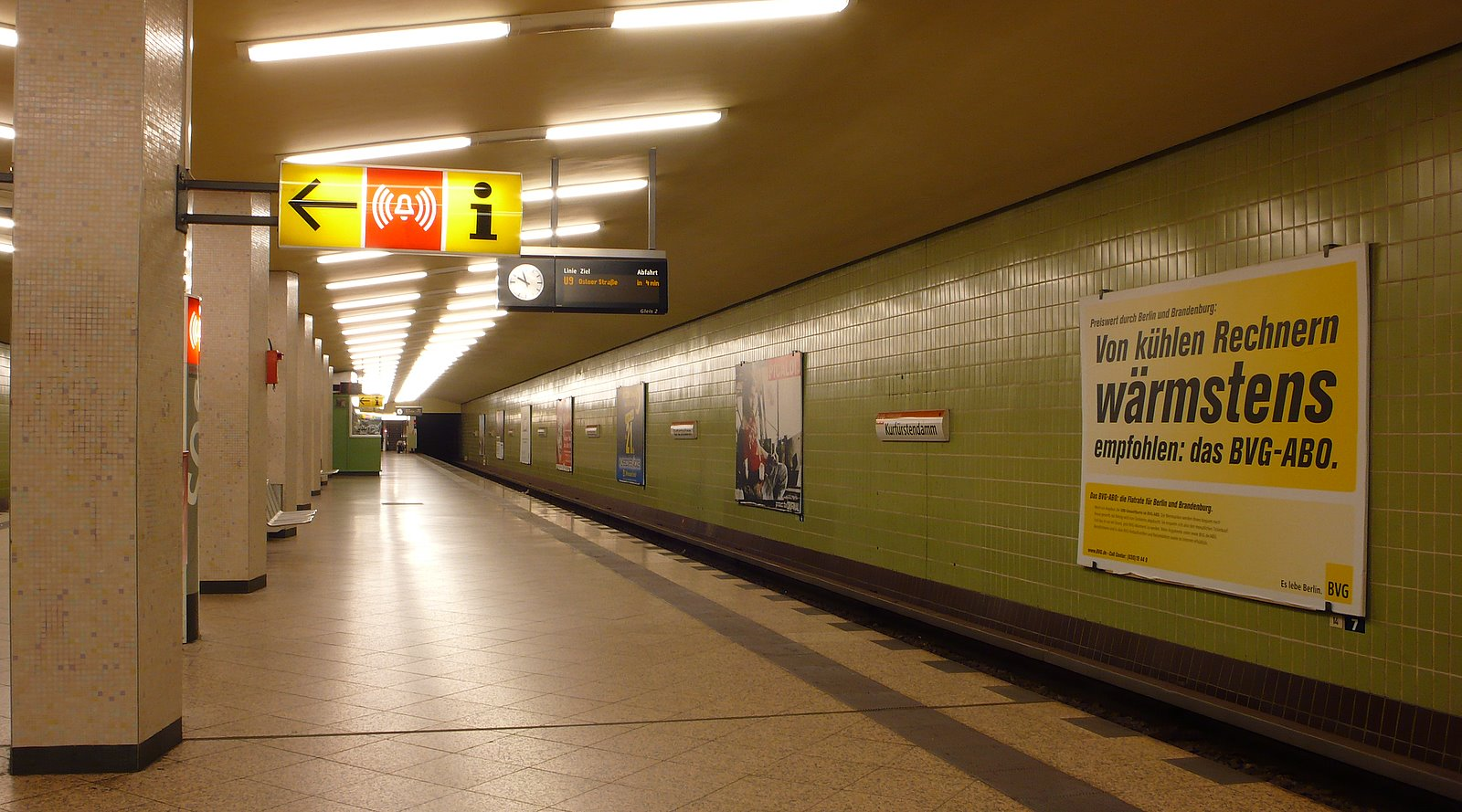
U9 platform

Kurfürstendamm is an underground station on lines U1 and U9 of the Berlin U-Bahn. It opened on 28 August 1961, when the first section of the U9 between Spichernstraße and Leopoldplatz was inaugurated. As there had originally been no stop on the U1 where it now crossed the U9, the line received an additional station here.

It lies in eastern Charlottenburg at the intersection of Kurfürstendamm and Joachimsthaler Straße, south of the Berlin Zoological Garden and its adjoining railway station. At the intersection above the station is the Café Kranzler, successor of the Café des Westens, a famous venue for artists and bohémiens of the pre–World War I era, as well as the Swissôtel Berlin.

The well-known Kurfürstendamm (or Ku'damm) boulevard is the most important upscale shopping district in Berlin. Next to the Kaiser-Wilhelm-Gedächtniskirche (Kaiser Wilhelm Memorial Church) on Breitscheidplatz, which was shattered during the air raids in World War II, a new church was built.

A scene of the film "Christiane F." was filmed at the station. It was then still called "Kurfürstendamm (Joachimstaler Straße)". The station bore that name until the end of the 1980s. The street Joachimsthaler Straße itself is named after the Joachimsthalsches Gymnasium and ultimately after the city of Joachimsthal. The street was named "Joachimsthaler Straße" until the end of the 1920s. From then until 2014, it was written without the "h", because of a spelling reform in 1901 after which the word "Tal" (valley; dale) was not written with an "h" anymore. Since the reform, however, did not affect place names, the city of Joachimsthal asked for renaming the street again in 2013.
