= Spichernstraße station =

Station of the Berlin U-Bahn

Coordinates: 52°29′48″N 13°19′52″E

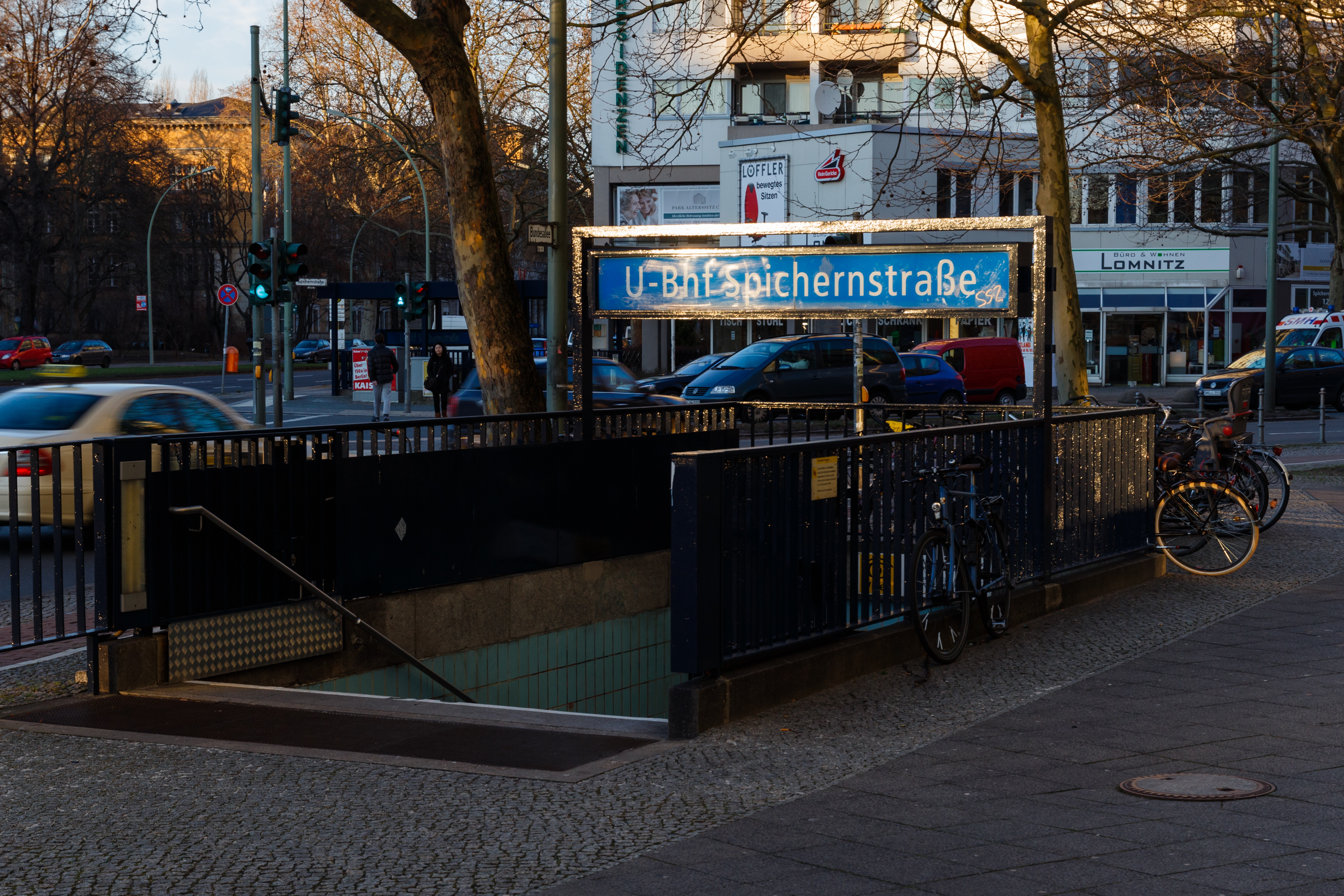
Entrance

Spichernstraße is a Berlin U-Bahn station located on the U3 and the U9 lines, located in Wilmersdorf neighbourhood. The U3 (then called A^{II} and B^{II}) portion opened on 2 June 1959, replacing the nearby Nürnberger Platz station, which was closed and dismantled. The U9 portion, which lies deeper underground, opened on 28 August 1961 as the southern terminus of the new line, then called G. The eponymous street is named after Spicheren in Lorraine, France, site of the 1870 Battle of Spicheren.

== The station ==
The U3 platform of the station is under Spichernstraße; the U9 platform is under Bundesallee. Both have exits at each end of the platform. The station is equipped with several escalators and a lift.

=== U9 ===
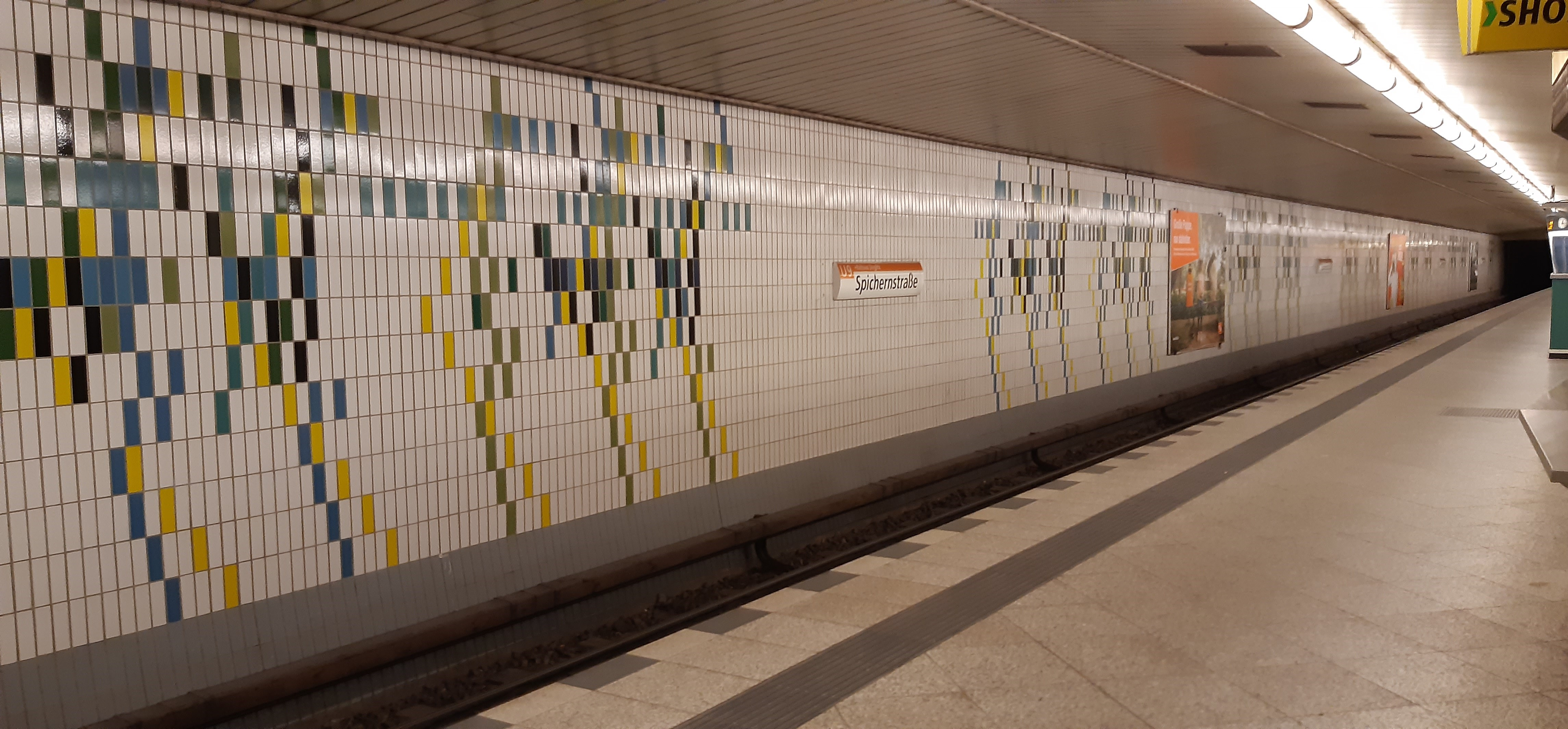
U9 platform

The U9 portion of the station was designed by Bruno Grimmek; it was one of the first built. Like all stations on the line, it has a centre platform 8.85 m (29.0 ft) wide. Exits at the two ends of the platform lead to Joachimsthaler Straße in the north, at the south end a mezzanine and passageways connect to the U3.

When the station opened, the walls were pale blue and the hexagonal columns on the platform dark blue. Grey tiles with pink and white patterns and dark blue columns were used in the mezzanine areas. (The initial stretch of Line G had stations in a repeating sequence of pale blue, white, yellow, and pale green colour schemes.) Although the station was a terminus until 1971, it did not have a turning area. Trains terminated at the platform, and changed tracks before entering it.

The platform space was completely renovated in 1986/87: both walls and columns were clad in white tiles, with a pattern of coloured tiles on the walls. The design by Gabriele Stierl is intended to represent the visualisation of a piece of music for an ensemble of 12 instruments, in homage to the nearby Berlin State School of Music and the Performing Arts. The "butterfly ceiling" which was also typical of the stations on this line was replaced with panels, with a relief line in yellow running down the centre as a sharp colour contrast.

=== U3 ===
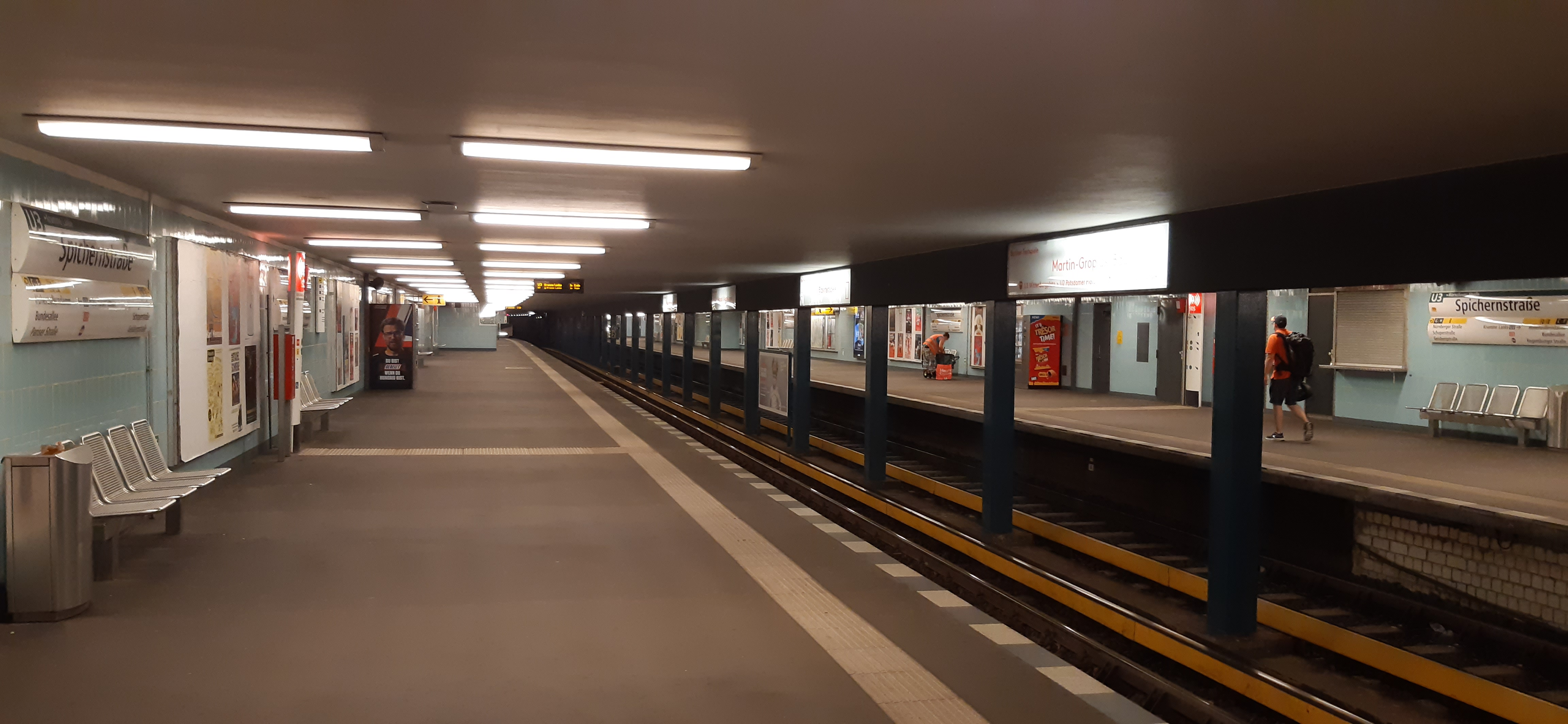
U3 platform

As there had not been a station on the A^{II}/B^{II} (now U3) line at the interchange point, the Nürnberger Platz station, located only one or two hundred metres to the north, was replaced with the new Spichernstraße station, while the new Augsburger Straße station was opened in the northeast. To facilitate transfers to the new G (now U9) line, the U3 section of Spichernstraße station was built with side platforms rather than a centre platform as at the old station. Construction was relatively simple since there was a turning area for the Nürnberger Platz station at the location; trains were routed over the ancillary tracks and the new platforms constructed on the site of the former main tracks.

The station has exits at both ends. A passenger tunnel under the tracks connects the two platforms; the connection to the U9 is at the south end of the station. This part of the station still has pale blue tiled walls; the mezzanine and the passage leading to the U9 have sand-coloured tiles.

| Preceding station | Berlin U-Bahn | Following station |
|---|---|---|
| Hohenzollernplatz towards Krumme Lanke | U3 | Augsburger Straße towards Warschauer Straße |
| Güntzelstraße towards Rathaus Steglitz | U9 | Kurfürstendamm towards Osloer Straße |
