= U12 (Berlin U-Bahn) =

Rapid transit line in Berlin, Germany

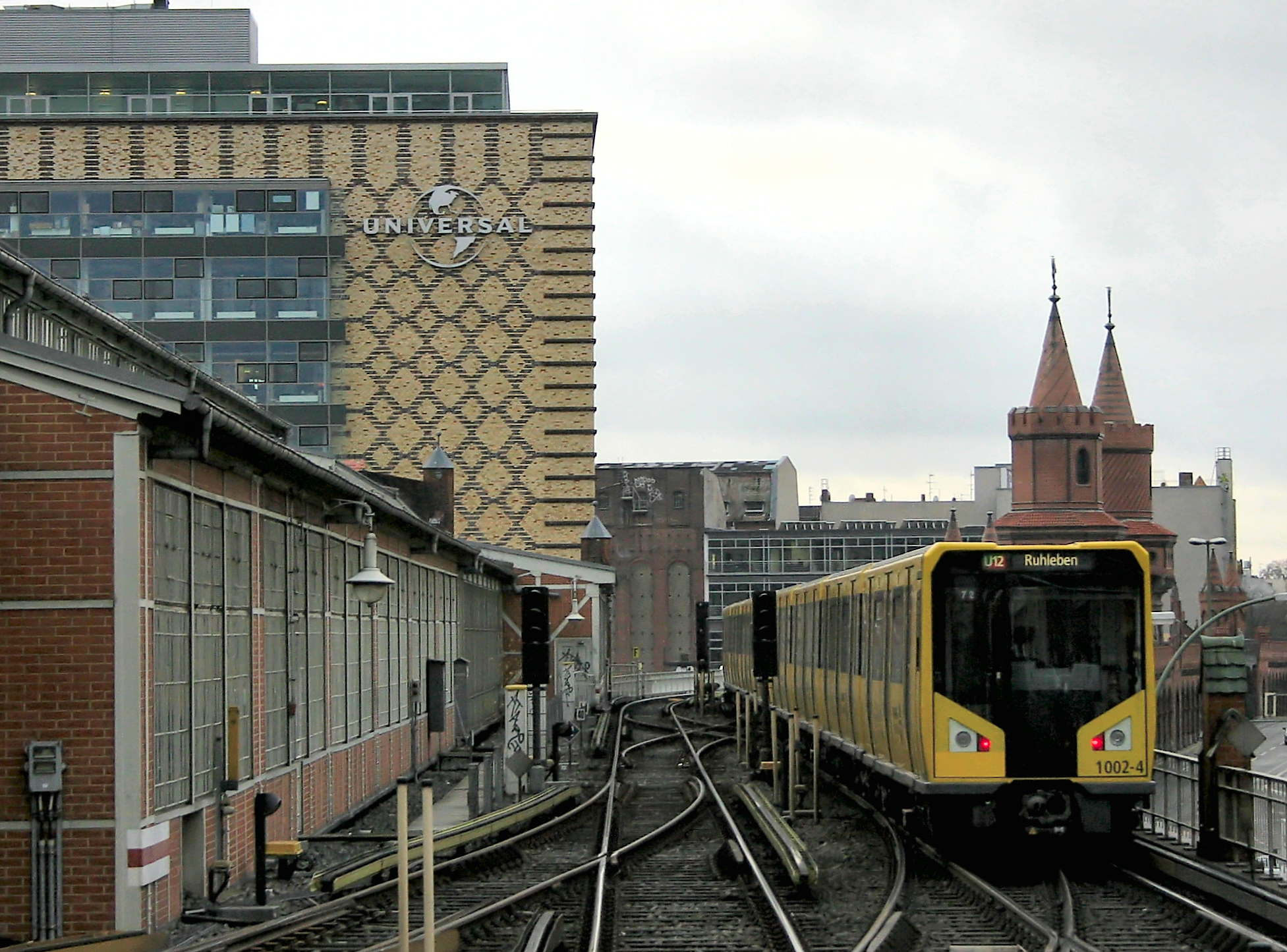
- A U12 train leaving Warschauer Straße

Overview
- Status: Terminated
- Locale: Berlin
- Termini: Warschauer Straße; Ruhleben
- Stations: 20

Service
- Type: Rapid transit
- System: Berlin U-Bahn
- Operator(s): Berliner Verkehrsbetriebe
- Depot(s): Grunewald; Warschauer Straße
- Rolling stock: A3; G; HK; IK

History
- Created: 13 November 1993
- Withdrawn: 15 June 2003

Technical
- Line length: 16.0 km (9.9 mi)
- Track gauge: 1,435 mm (4 ft 8 1/2 in) standard gauge
- Loading gauge: Kleinprofil
- Electrification: 750 V DC third rail (top running)

The U12 is a Berlin U-Bahn line. It existed between 1993 and June 2003, as a peak-time and night line between Ruhleben (today U2) and Warschauer Straße (today U1) stations.

The line was withdrawn in June 2003 and more night-time lines were introduced, which is U1, U2, U3 (from 2006), U5, U6, U7, U8 and U9.

The route remains available for temporary use when it is not possible to run a full U1, U2 or U3 service for reasons such as maintenance.

== Route ==
From November 1956, no trains ran through from Pankow to Ruhleben, as the line A^{I} was shortened to today's Theodor-Heuss-Platz and a new line designated AB^{I} was implemented, which in May 1957 had been called line B^{I}. This changed from Ruhleben coming behind Wittenbergplatz station on the relief route in the direction of Warschauer Brücke.

In 1966, this became the well-known line 1, after which the eponymous musical is named and whose plot plays on this line, before renumbering to U1 in 1984. In 1990, a night-time variant was introduced.

Its eastern end point was Schlesisches Tor in the West Berlin district of Kreuzberg from 13 August 1961 to 13 November 1993, due to the route's truncation by the construction of the Wall. After German reunification, the connection between Warschauer Straße and Schlesisches Tor was reopened in October 1995. This led to the lines U1 (from Krumme Lanke), U12 (from Ruhleben) and U15 (from Uhlandstraße) running to Warschauer Straße.

== Special ==
On 18 August 2006, this line was in service again as a replacement service for the U2 between Gleisdreieck and Ruhleben. Bridge building works between Gleisdreieck and Bülowstraße prevented trains running on that track until 18 March 2007. The trains that were used are A3E, A3L67/71/82/92, GI/1, GI/1E and HK.

In 2011 line U12 was brought back into existence again due to repair work currently being undertaken at Gleisdreieck, however it was only after protests by passengers who had to transfer at Wittenbergplatz to continue their journeys on lines U1 and U2 that line U12 was re-established for the second time.

It resumed its old route for a short period of time between May and November 2015, due to repair work taking place in the Gleisdreieck station.

On 22 June 2020, the U12 line was reinstated due to maintenance repairs of the U1, U2 and U3. The U12 runs between Kottbusser Tor (via Wittenbergplatz) to Ruhleben station. It is expected to run until 9 August 2020.

On 15 August 2022, the U12 line was again reinstated due to maintenance on the U1, U2, and U3. These repairs are scheduled until 6 November 2022 with the U1, U2, U3, and U12 services altered multiple times during this period. The first phase (from 15 August to 18 September) had the U12 line running between Ruhleben and Warschauer Straße and U2 from Pankow to Gleisdreieck. U1 was suspended, and U3 was left unaltered. A break in construction (from 19 to 25 September) suspended U12 service, restored full service on U2 and U3, and partial service on U1 from Gleisdreieck to Warschauer Straße. The second phase (from 26 September to 27 October) has the U12 line running again between Ruhleben and Warschauer Straße, with the U2 serviced between Ruhleben and Potsdamer Platz with a shuttle service continuing to Gleisdreieck. U3 service is unaffected, and U1 service is suspended. The third phase (from 28 October to 6 November) will have U12 service suspended and U2 service unaffected. The U1 will run between Warschauer Straße and Gleisdreieck, and the U3 will run between Krumme Lanke and Nollendorfplatz.

On 24 March 2025, the U12 line was again reinstated due to maintenance on the U1, U2 and U3. The U12 replaces the U1 and U3 lines from Warschauer Straße to Wittenbergplatz and the U2 line in the western section to Ruhleben. It is expected to run until 05 June 2025.

== Notes ==
- This English article was translated from its German Wikipedia counterpart.
