= U1 (Berlin U-Bahn) =

Rapid transit line in Berlin, Germany

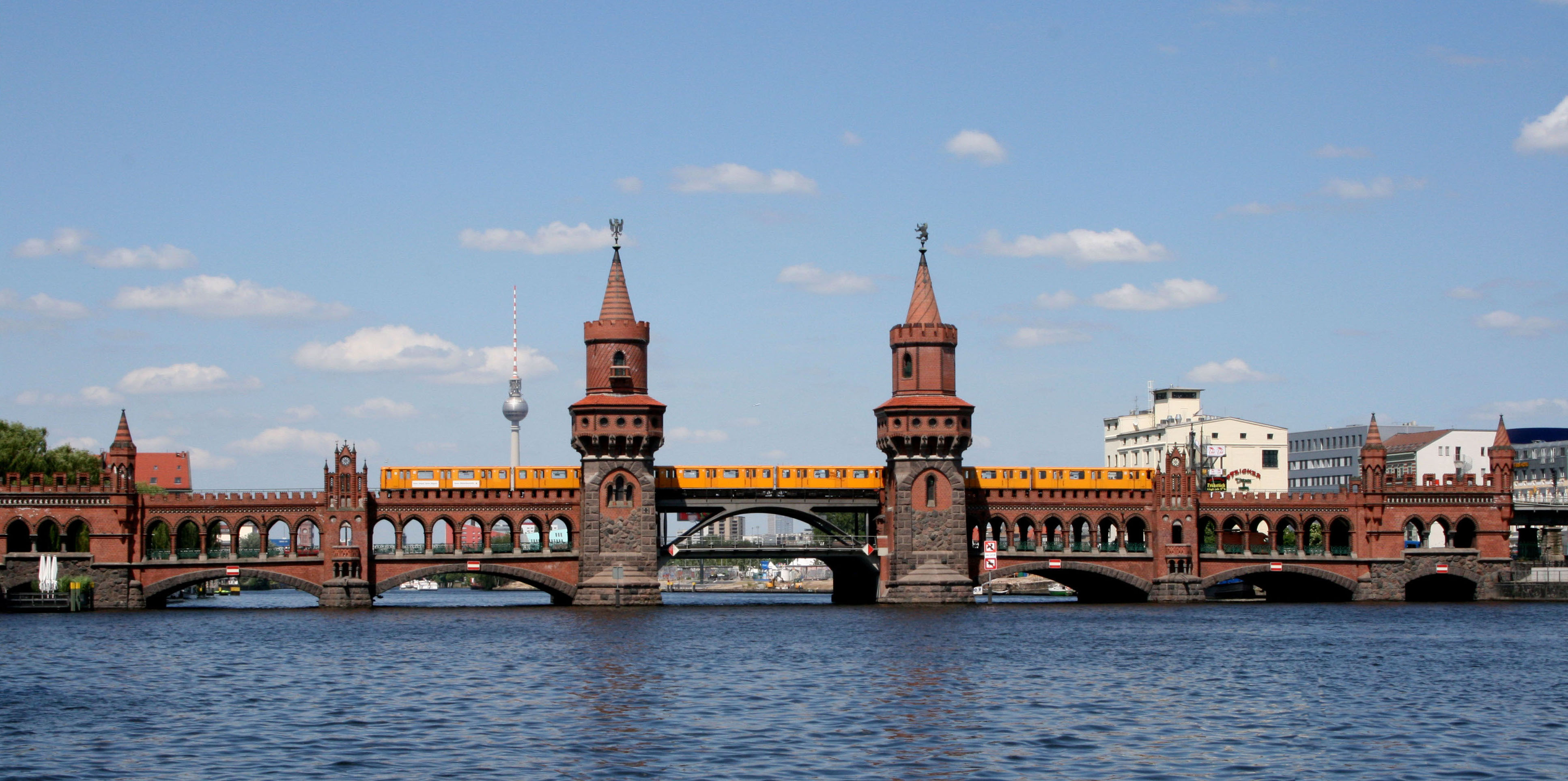
- A U1 train crossing the Oberbaumbrücke

Overview
- Locale: Berlin
- Termini: Warschauer Straße; Uhlandstraße
- Stations: 13

Service
- Type: Rapid transit
- System: Berlin U-Bahn
- Operator: Berliner Verkehrsbetriebe
- Depots: Grunewald; Warschauer Straße
- Rolling stock: A3 • G • HK • IK

History
- Opened: 18 February 1902; 124 years ago (Note: From Stralauer Tor (closed 1945) to Möckernbrücke)
- Last extension: 24 October 1926 (Note: From Gleisdreieck to Wittenbergplatz)

Technical
- Line length: 9.0 km (5.6 mi)
- Track gauge: 1,435 mm (4 ft 8 1/2 in) standard gauge
- Loading gauge: Kleinprofil
- Electrification: 750 V DC third rail (top running)
Route map
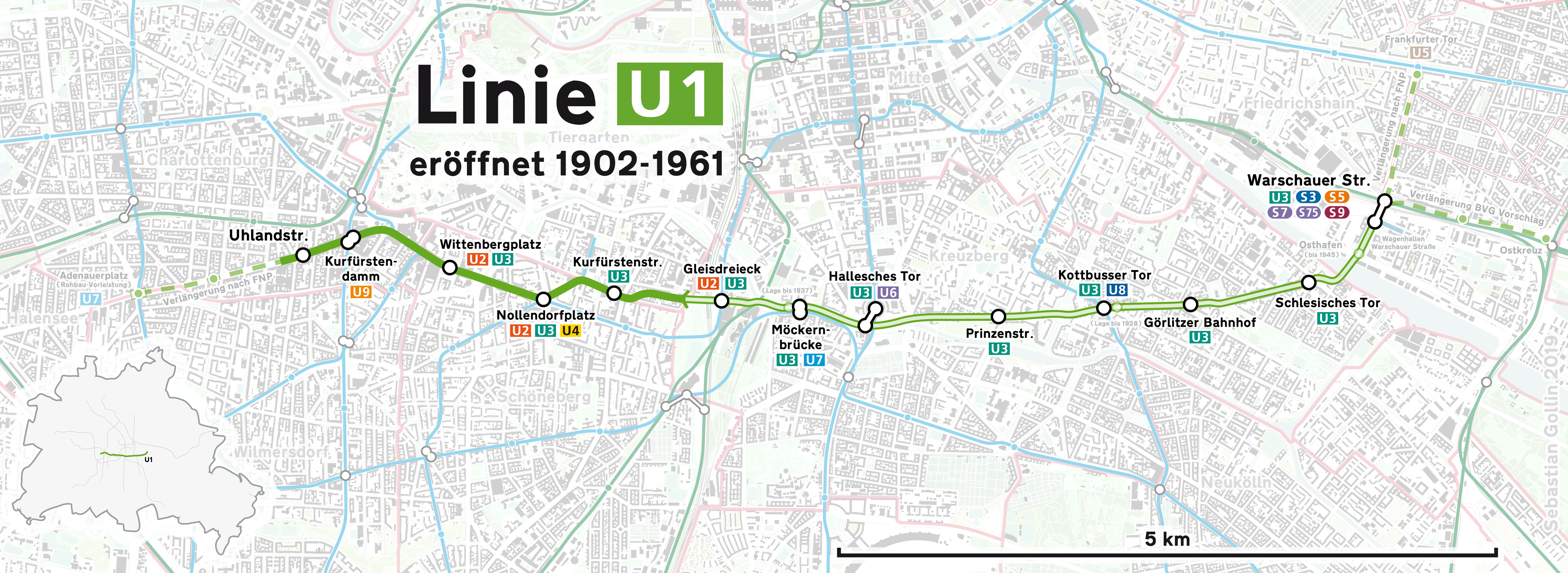

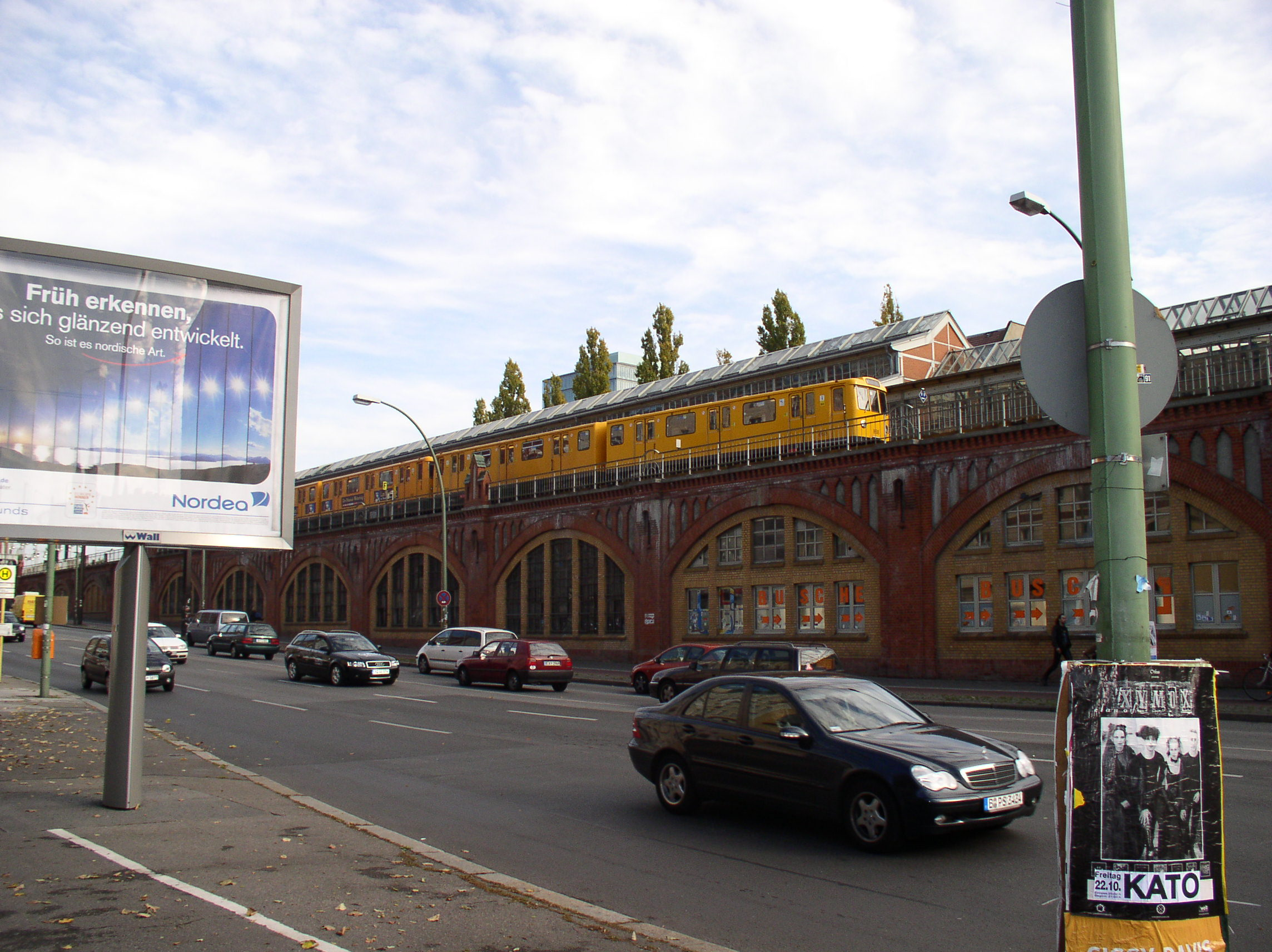
U1 train leaving Warschauer Straße station, heading for Schlesisches Tor

U1 is a line on the Berlin U-Bahn, which is 8.8 kilometres (5.5 mi) long and has 13 stations. Its traditional line designation was B^{II}. It runs east–west and its eastern terminus is Warschauer Straße S-Bahn station where it connects to the Schlesische Bahn. From there it runs through Kreuzberg via Gleisdreieck and Wittenbergplatz on to the Kurfürstendamm.

The eastern section of the line is the oldest part of the Berlin U-Bahn, although it is largely above ground.

== Nomenclature ==
The U1 route was originally part of B^{II} until 1957, where it was renamed to B^{IV} until 1 March 1966. While the main section between Wittenbergplatz and Schlesisches Tor has been designated as line 1 since 1966, the western end of the line has changed twice. It was consequently renumbered to Line "3" and "U3" in 1993, before being renamed U15 until 2004.

== History ==
The increasing traffic problems in Berlin at the end of the 19th century led to a search for new efficient means of transport. Inspired by Werner von Siemens, numerous suggestions were made for overhead conveyors, such as a suspension railway, as was later built in Wuppertal, or a tube railway as was built in London. Finally Siemens and some prominent Berliners submitted a plan for an elevated railway on the model of New York. These people opposed Siemens' suggestion of building an overhead railway in the major street of Friedrichstrasse, but the city of Berlin opposed underground railways, since it feared damage to one of its new sewers.

Finally, after many years and negotiations, Siemens proposal for an elevated railway line from Warschauer Brücke via Hallesches Tor to Bülowstraße was approved. This was only possible, however, because it passed through poor areas. The richer residents of Leipziger Straße pressed the city administration to prevent the line using their street. Siemens & Halske carried out all construction work and also owned the line. The first sod was turned on 10 September 1896 in Gitschiner Straße. The construction work had to be carried out quickly because the contract with the city of Berlin, signed with the granting of the concession, specified that the line had to be finished within two years, or a penalty of 50,000 marks would be payable.

The railway engineers developed a design for the supporting columns for the elevated railway, but it was unpopular and the architect Alfred Grenander was asked to submit an artistic solution for this problem. For the next 30 years Grenander was the house architect for the elevated and underground railway.

After tough negotiations with the city of Charlottenburg it was decided to extend the line to Knie along the Tauentzienstrasse, but instead of being elevated it would be a subsurface (cut-and-cover) railway. The management of the city of Berlin board of works regarded the idea of an underground railway sympathetically. Since the underground caused no apparent damage to the new sewer, an underground branch could be built from a junction at Gleisdreieck (German for "rail triangle") to Potsdamer Platz, Berlin's then city centre. The national government granted permission for the planning changes on 1 November 1900.

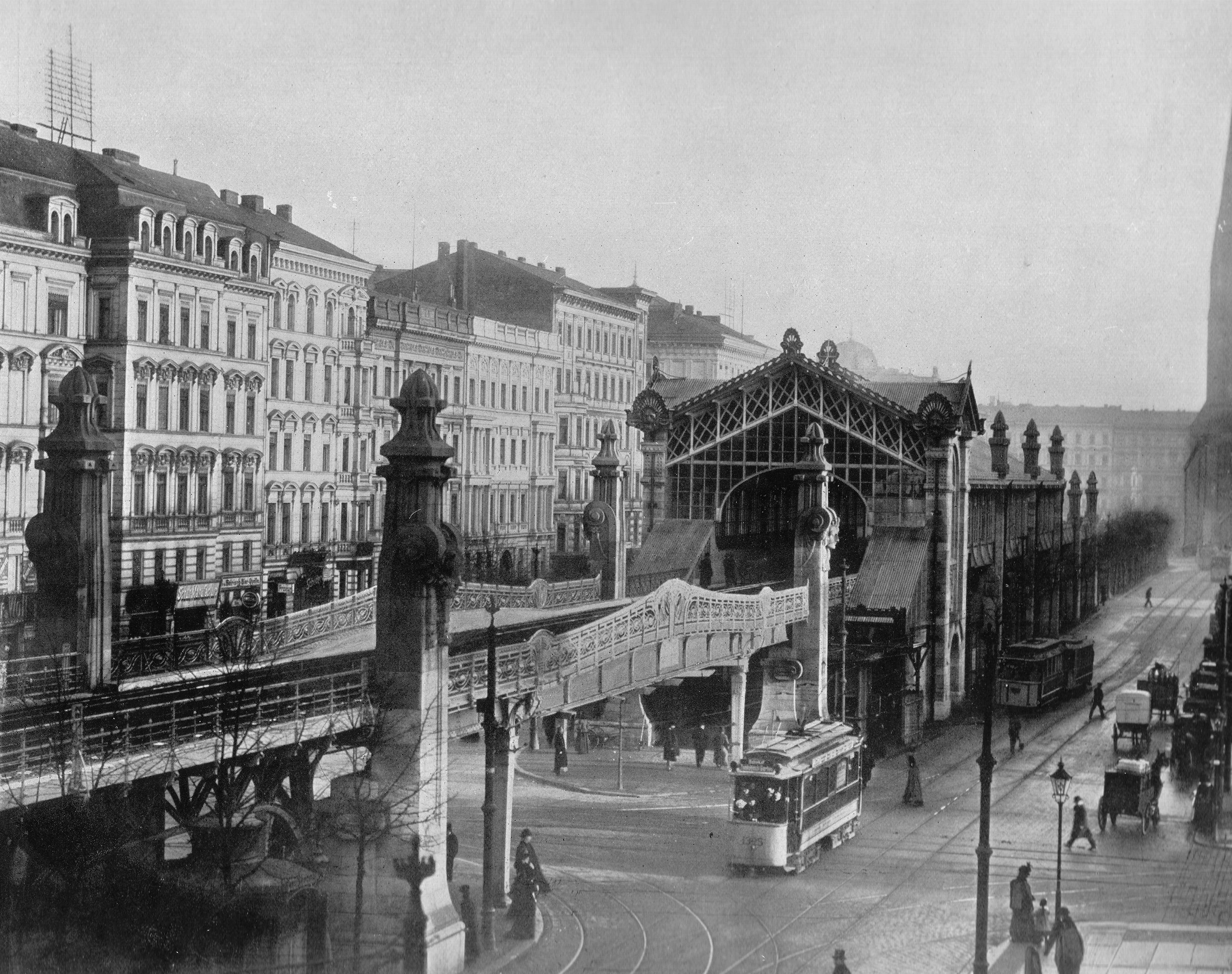
The Bülowstraße elevated station in 1903

The total length of the elevated and underground railway was now 10.1 kilometres (6.3 mi). The largest part of the route, approximately 8 kilometres (5.0 mi), would be established on viaducts and connect eleven elevated stations. In addition there would be 2 kilometres (1.2 mi) of underground line with three underground stations. The planners believed that 8-carriage trains would not be needed and therefore designed it with 80 m (260 ft)-long platforms, sufficient only for 6-carriage trains.

The first 6 kilometres (3.7 mi) of the line was finished in 1901 and on 15 February 1902 the first train ran on the line from Potsdamer Platz to Zoologischer Garten, then to Stralauer Tor and back to Potsdamer Platz. This allowed many prominent Berliners to participate in the opening trip, including the Prussian minister for public works, Karl von Thielen. On 18 February 1902 the first stage of the Berlin U-Bahn was officially opened (Stralauer Tor–Potsdamer Platz). In March the line was extended to Zoologischer Garten and on 17 August it was extended by 380 m (1,250 ft) from Stralauer Tor to Warschauer Brücke. There were at that time only two lines:

- From Warschauer Brücke to Zoologischer Garten via Potsdamer Platz (with reversal).
- From Warschauer Brücke directly to Zoologischer Garten.

On 14 December the line was extended to Knie. The section between Gleisdreieck and Knie (now Ernst-Reuter-Platz) is now part of U2.

=== U-Bahn to Dahlem and the branch to Uhlandstraße ===
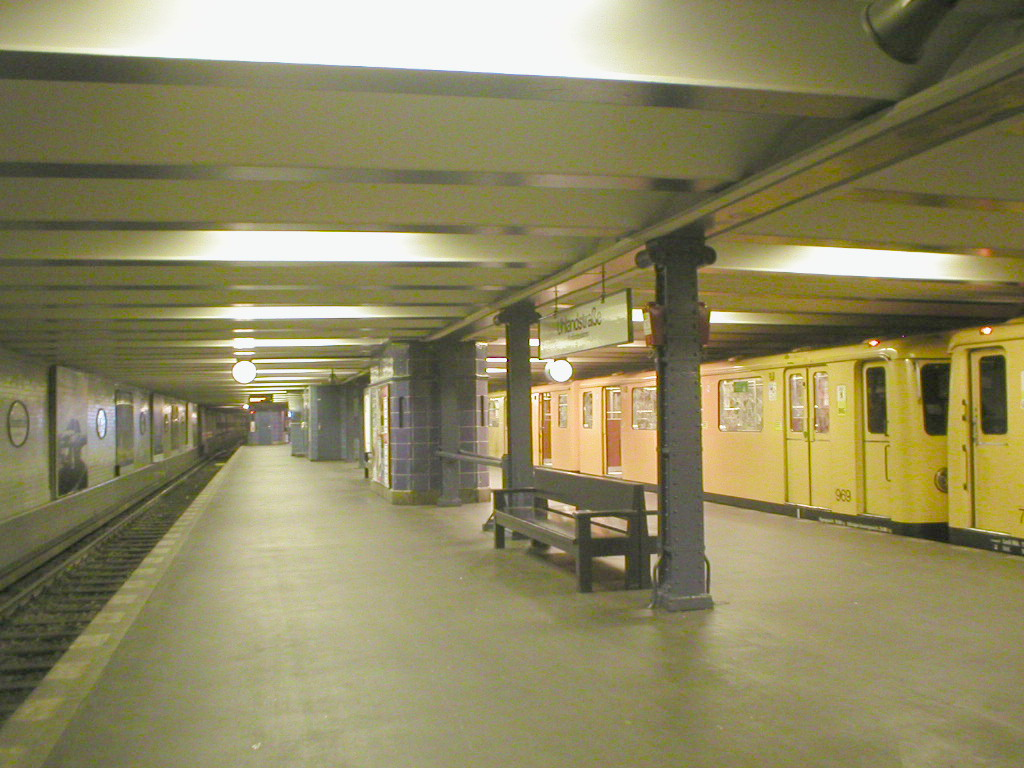
U-Bahnhof Uhlandstraße (U1)

In the summer of 1907, the elevated railway company of the new city of Wilmersdorf suggested the building of an underground line to the Wilmersdorf area. It suggested a line to Nürnberger Platz and, if Wilmersdorf would pay for it, to Breitenbachplatz. Since Wilmersdorf municipality had poor transport connections, the Wilmersdorf city fathers were pleased to take up this suggestion. The royal domain of Dahlem, which was south of Wilmersdorf and was still undeveloped, also supported a U-bahn connection and wanted it extended from Breitenbachplatz to Thielplatz.

However, the future line would run partly through the city of Charlottenburg, which saw the city of Wilmersdorf as a major competitor for the settlement of wealthy ratepayers. Long negotiations ensued, until finally in the summer of 1910 a solution was found: an additional line would be built under the Kurfürstendamm to Uhlandstraße. Work began on these lines in the same summer.

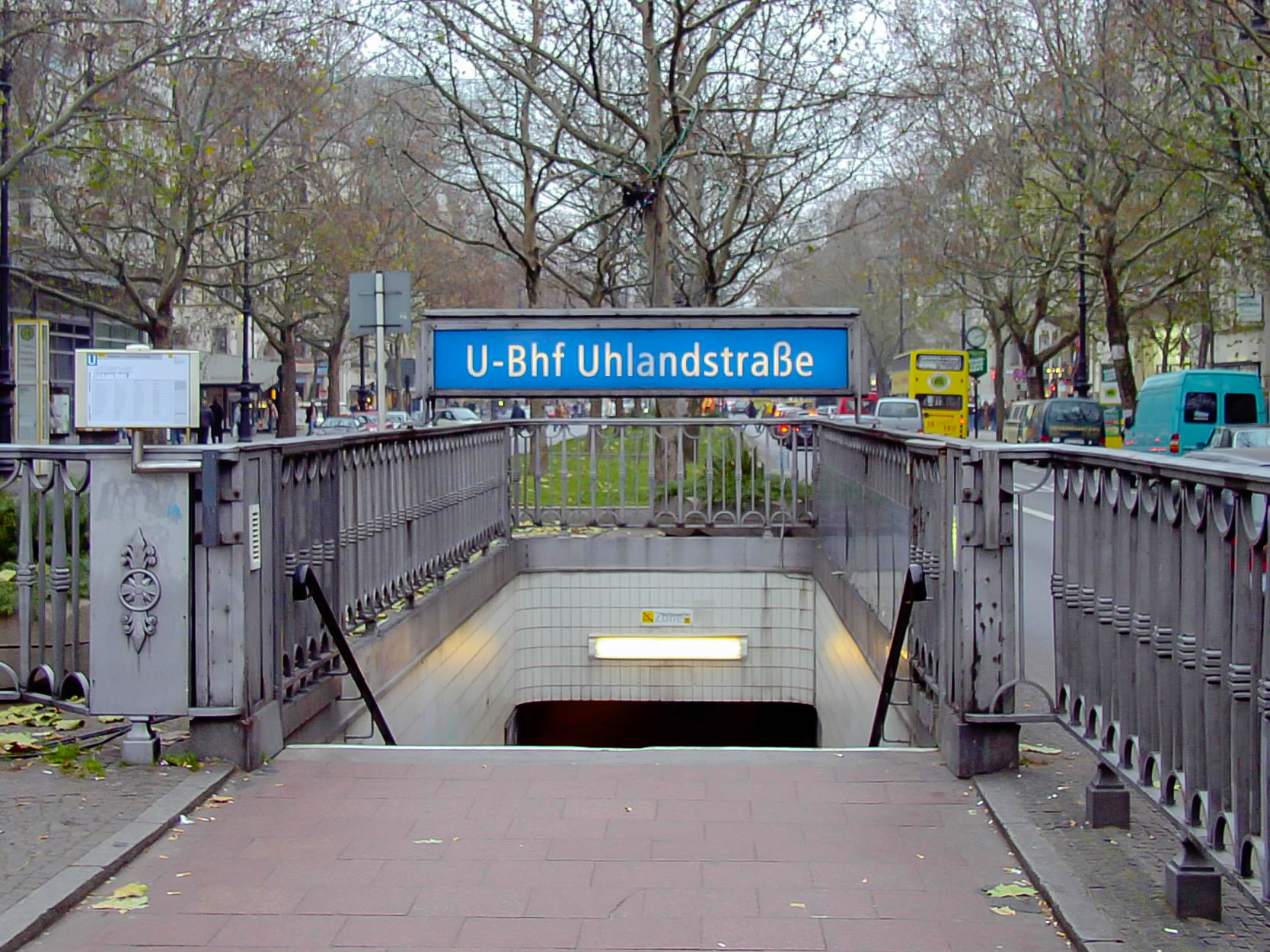
Eastern entrance of Uhlandstraße U-Bahn station

The double-track Wittenbergplatz station, which only had two side platforms, had to be completely rebuilt. The new station required five platforms with a sixth prepared for development and an entrance hall. The cities of Wilmersdorf and Charlottenburg submitted many suggestions for its design. Finally the house architect of the elevated railway company, Alfred Grenander, was appointed to design the station on the recommendation of the royal police chief.

The additional line to Uhlandstraße branched at Wittenbergplatz and had no intervening stations, but it was intended to be extended to Halensee. Nevertheless, the only addition to the line has been the building in 1961 of the Kurfürstendamm interchange station with the U9. It is still planned to extend the line to the west and preparations were made for it in the building of Internationales Congress Centrum on Neuen Kantstraße. In addition provisions have been made for a U1 station under the U7 station at Adenauerplatz.

After a relatively short construction period the Kurfürstendamm line, as it was called, was opened together with the Dahlem line on 12 October 1913. The length of the additional lines totaled about 10 kilometres (6.2 mi). These were the last sections of the Berlin U-Bahn built before World War I.

=== The new Gleisdreieck ===
The original route

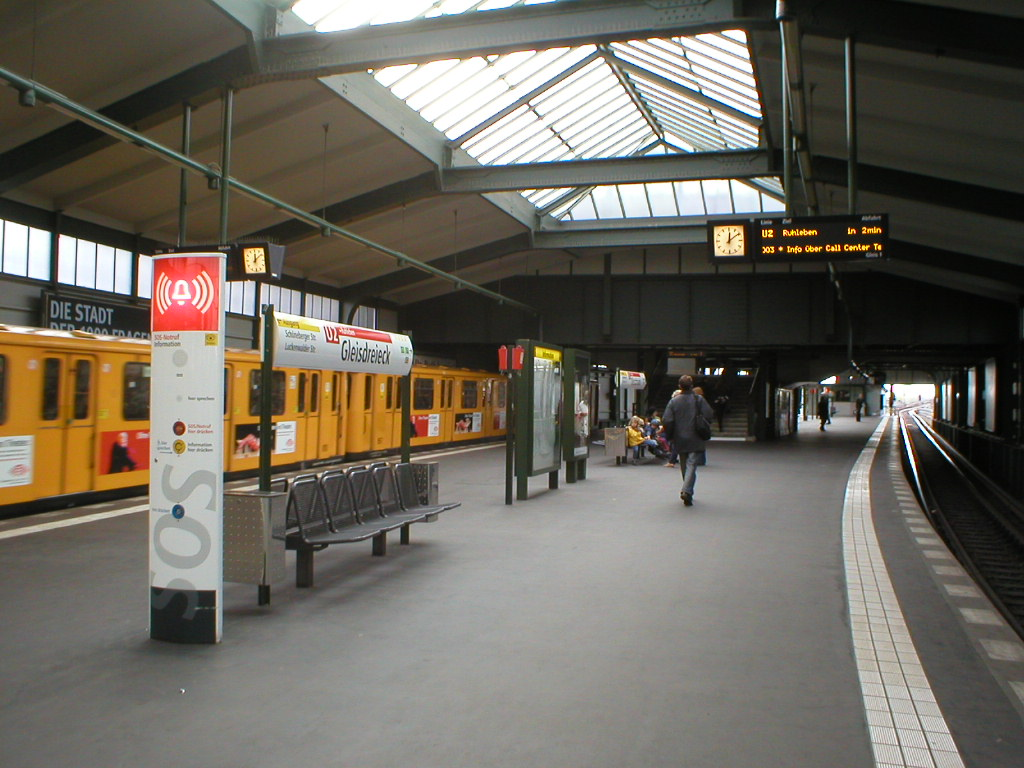
Gleisdreieck lower platform – today the U2 stops here

One of the most dangerous places of the entire U-Bahn network was found at the triangular rail junction at Gleisdreieck, which connected the main route between Warschauer Brücke and Zoologischer Garten with the branch line to Potsdamer Platz. This branch was protected only by signals, so that train-driver inattention could easily lead to a disaster, as happened on 26 September 1908. A U-Bahn train ran into the side of another train, forcing two carriages off the track. One carriage fell over the viaduct and 21 passengers died. As a result, it was decided to change the configuration at Gleisdreieck.

Construction began in May 1912 to replace the rail triangle with two lines built as a grade-separated cross with a new Gleisdreieck interchange station at the intersection. These lines now form part of U1 and U2. The new works were carried out largely with full services operating, although services were briefly interrupted on each line. On 3 November 1912 the new Gleisdreieck station was opened but construction was not completed until August 1913. The connecting track from the Pankow direction to the Warschauer Straße direction continued to operate until the completion of works for construction supply vehicles.

=== Last small profile U-Bahn opened ===
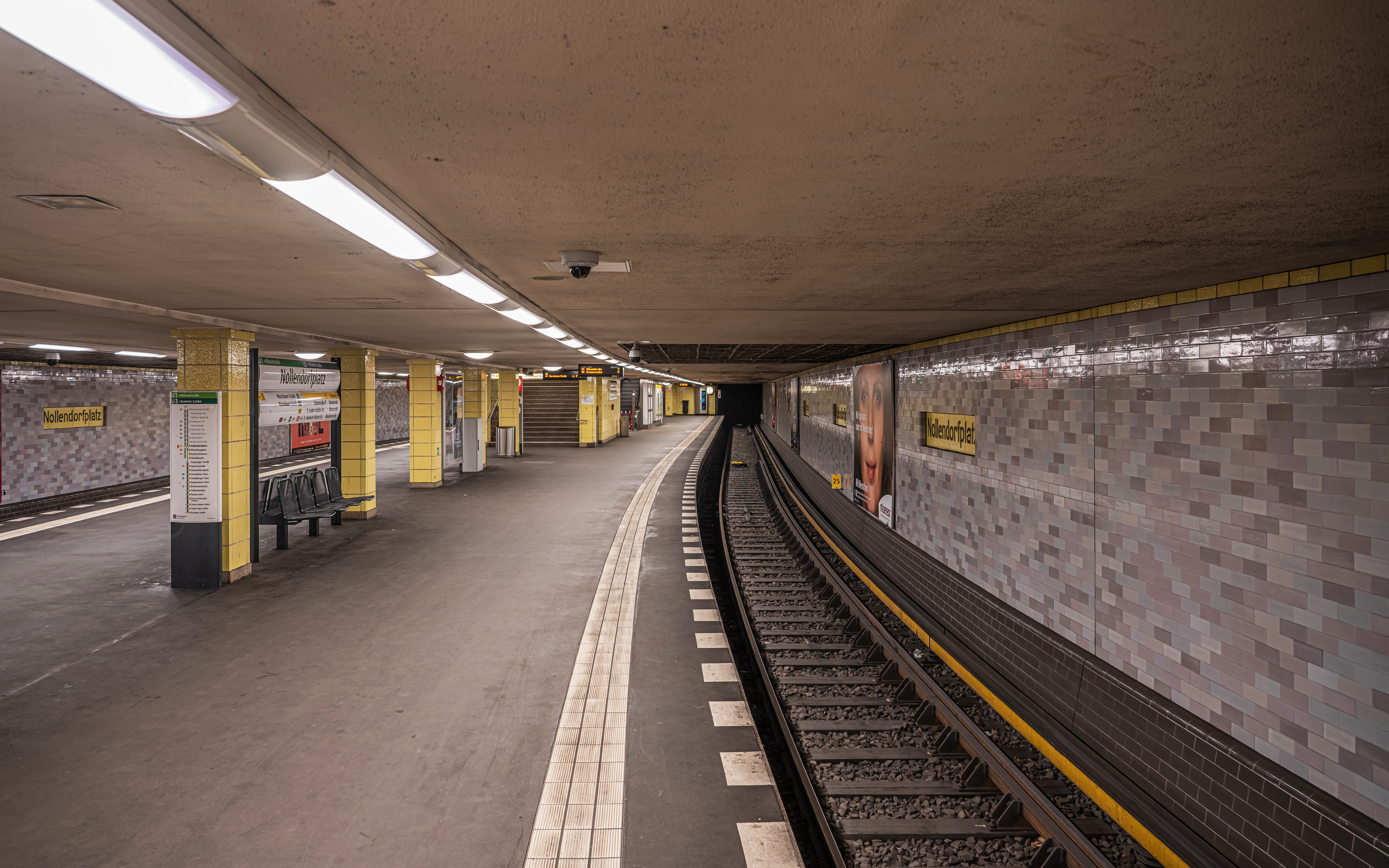
Nollendorfplatz station

The small profile network was only slightly extended during the Weimar Republic. The new arrangement at Gleisdreieck was completed. The additional line created by the conversion of the three way junction to a cross at Gleisdreieck was extended under Kurfürstenstraße to Nollendorfplatz and was opened on 24 October 1926 together with the rebuilt Nollendorfplatz station. The basic fit-out of the Kurfürstenstraße station bears witness to the difficult financial times. As part of this work, the Nollendorfplatz station was completely rebuilt to incorporate the Schöneberg line (now U4), which had continued to be independently operated after its take over by the city of Berlin in 1920. The new Nollendorfplatz station has two underground platforms, one below the other and looking identical. The Schöneberg line ends on the higher level across the platform from trains coming from Wittenbergplatz. Trains run from the lower level to Schöneberg and Wittenbergplatz, also allowing cross-platform transfers. The elevated station of today's U2 remained completely unchanged. Its impressive dome was destroyed in World War II and a simplified dome was only re-established on the U-Bahn's 100-year anniversary in 2002.

=== Kurfürstendamm station ===
The new Berlin sector administration in West Berlin focussed on the reconstruction of buses and trams starting in the late 1940s. It also recognised that the densely populated districts of Steglitz, Wedding and Reinickendorf needed a rail connection to the then redeveloping centre around Zoologischer Garten. This could not be achieved however with line extensions and a new line was necessary. Therefore, a proposal was made to build line G (now U9) from central Wedding, near Osloer Straße, through Moabit, the centre of West Berlin, near Zoo and Kurfürstendamm, the Bundesallee and the Schloßstraße to Rathaus Steglitz. This line was the third north-south line, after lines C (U6) and D (U8).

In addition, a new station would be built at the intersection of the newly-built line with the then U3 (now U1). Instead of building the station with services operating, the “stub line” was simply shut down so that the rail interchange could be built under the crossing of Joachimstaler Straße and Kurfürstendamm. Line G was due to be opened on 2 September 1961, but on 13 August the GDR government commenced building the Berlin Wall, making the line even more important. Therefore, the opening date was brought forward to 28 August.

=== Fall of the wall and reunification of the networks ===
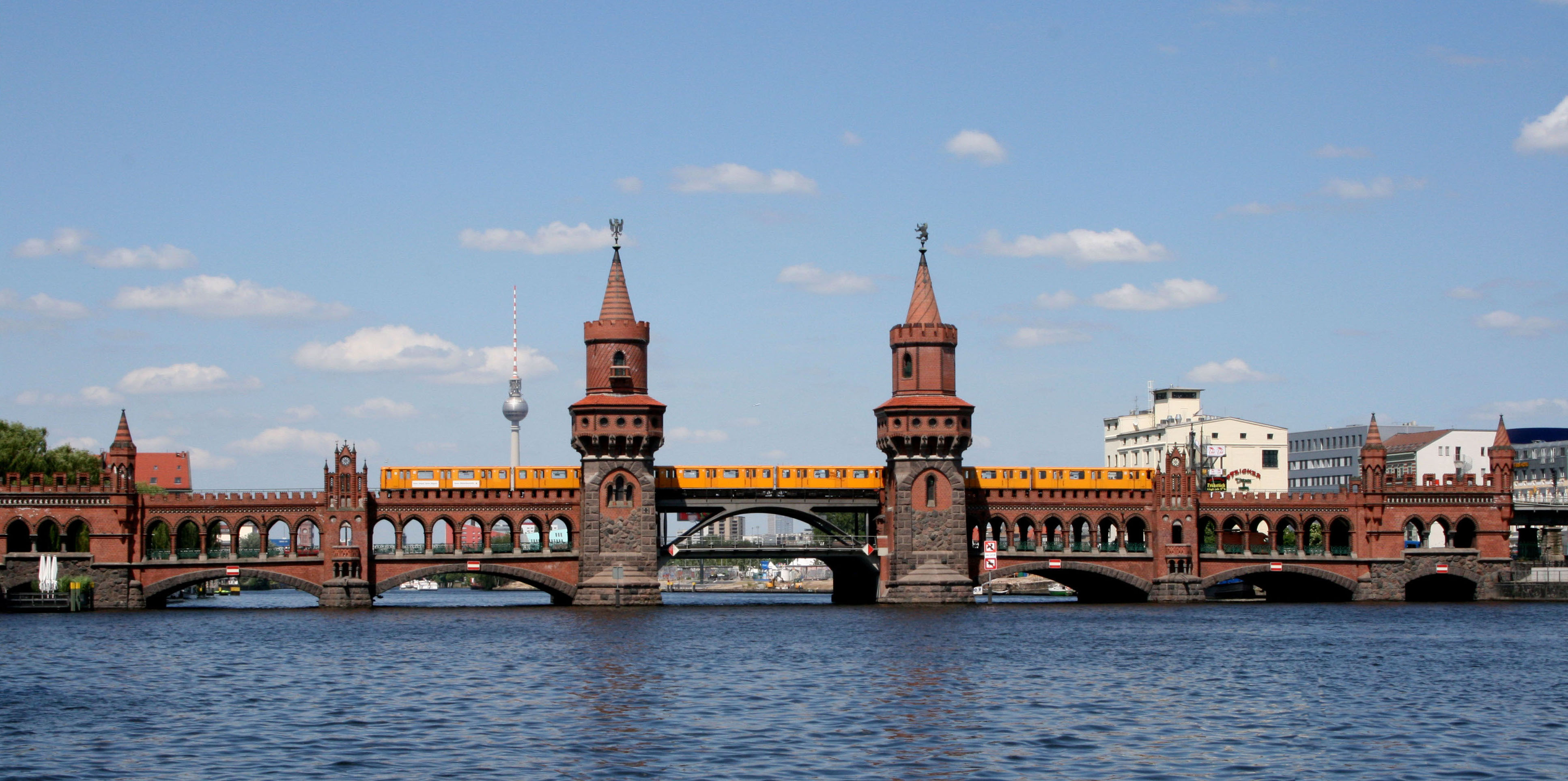
Since 1995 the U-Bahn runs again over the Oberbaumbrücke

After the fall of the Berlin Wall on 9 November 1989 and German reunification on 3 October 1990, it was also necessary to combine the two U-Bahn networks of the east and west again. When line U2 started running through in 1993, line U1 still ended at Schlesisches Tor station, where it had terminated since August 1961.

The first reconstruction work on the line began in 1992. Numerous repairs had to be made and new buildings were necessary because some station buildings had been demolished during the GDR era. The Oberbaumbrücke was also in a very run-down condition. The Spanish architect Santiago Calatrava drew up the plans for rebuilding the bridge. The station with its three platforms, the old signal tower, and the carriage shed in Rudolfstrasse all required repairs. After construction was completed, the first train ran on 14 October 1995 to Warschauer Straße (formerly called Warschauer Brücke, but renamed after the nearby S-Bahn station). There are plans for the U-Bahn station to be moved closer to the S-Bahn station, but due to financial constraints, this would not happen before at least 2015.

=== Planning ===
U-Bahn train crosses the Oberbaum Bridge, December 2014

In the east, an extension to the northeast to Frankfurter Tor (U5) has been planned since the 1920s, via Kopernikusstraße, but is not likely to be implemented for some time. It may have potential extensions to Forckenbeckplatz and Storkower Straße, whereas another extension is also underway to Hausburgstraße and Landsberger Allee. The Berlin U-Bahn 2014 Plans has been revived to allow the U1 to be extended to Ostkreuz, which increases the significance of Ostkreuz being a transit hub.

In the west, there are long-term plans to extend the line to Westkreuz via Schlüterstraße and Adenauerplatz (U7) and a new station at Kracauer Platz, instead of continuing the line to Halensee. The advantage would be the connection to the Ring- and Stadtbahn, whereas in Halensee, only the Ringbahn would connect. A line to Halensee could replace several bus lines. Westkreuz is almost only a station to change trains, as there is very limited passenger potential in the vicinity. While older plans for a continuation to Theodor-Heuss-Platz would create a line with above average passenger numbers, costs might be prohibitive compared to smaller and shorter alternatives.

== Opening dates ==
- 18 February 1902: Stralauer Tor ↔ Gleisdreieck
- 12 August 1902: Warschauer Brücke ↔ Stralauer Tor
- 3 November 1912: Gleisdreieck Station
- 12 October 1913: Wittenbergplatz ↔ Uhlandstraße
- 24 October 1926: Gleisdreieck ↔ Wittenbergplatz
- 28 August 1961: Kurfürstendamm Station

The Osthafen station, originally called Stralauer Tor, lay between Warschauer Brücke and Schlesisches Tor. Due to its proximity to Warschauer Brücke it was not rebuilt after the Second World War.

== In popular culture ==
The Pet Shop Boys track "Will-o'-the-wisp" is structured around a reference to U1, which it refers to by name along with four of its stations. The allusion is to the line's status as "a party train," serving areas known for gay nightlife.
