= Hohenzollernplatz station (Berlin U-Bahn) =

Station of the Berlin U-Bahn

Coordinates: 52°29′39″N 13°19′29″E

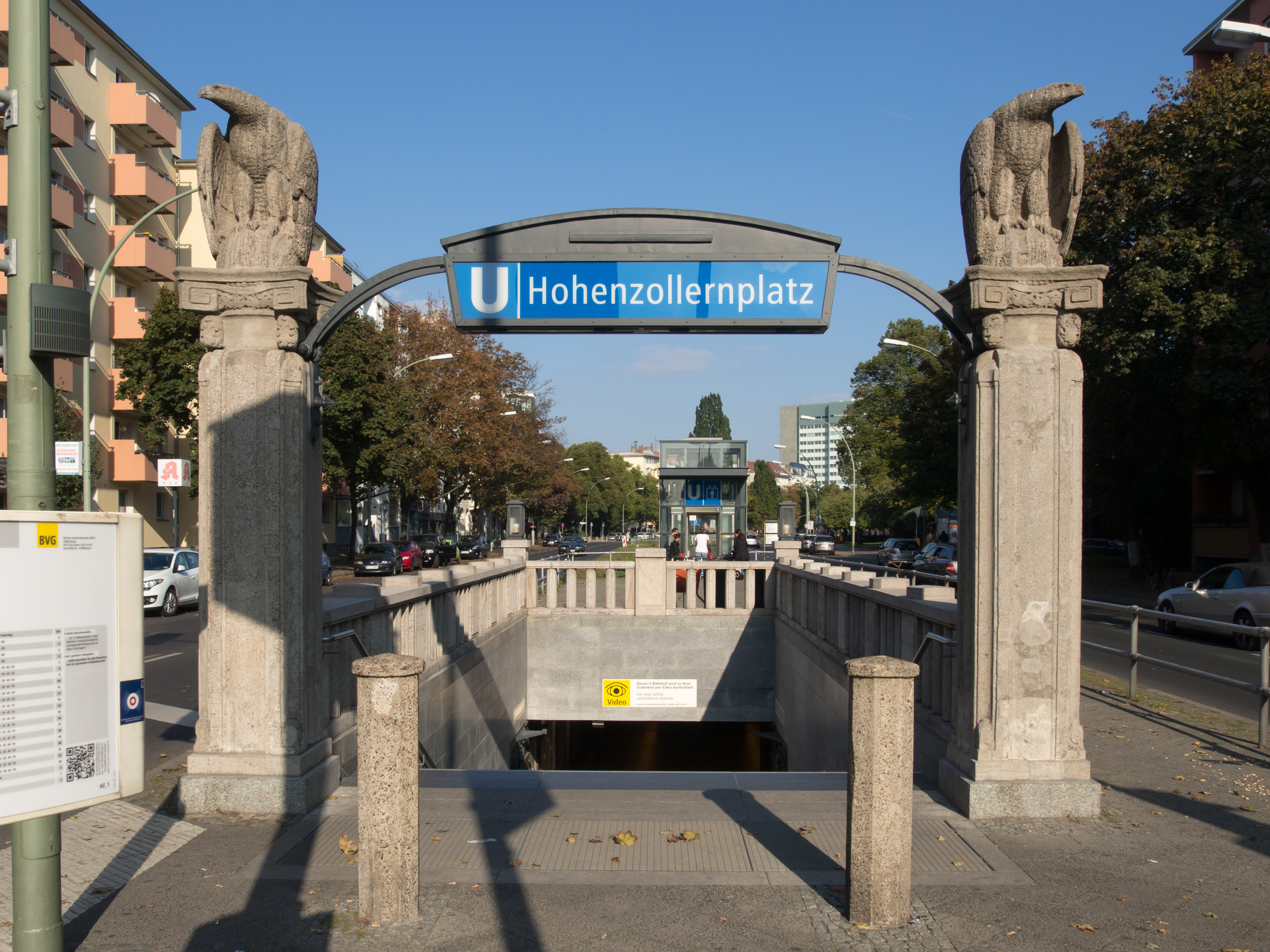
The entrance of U-Bahn station Hohenzollernplatz

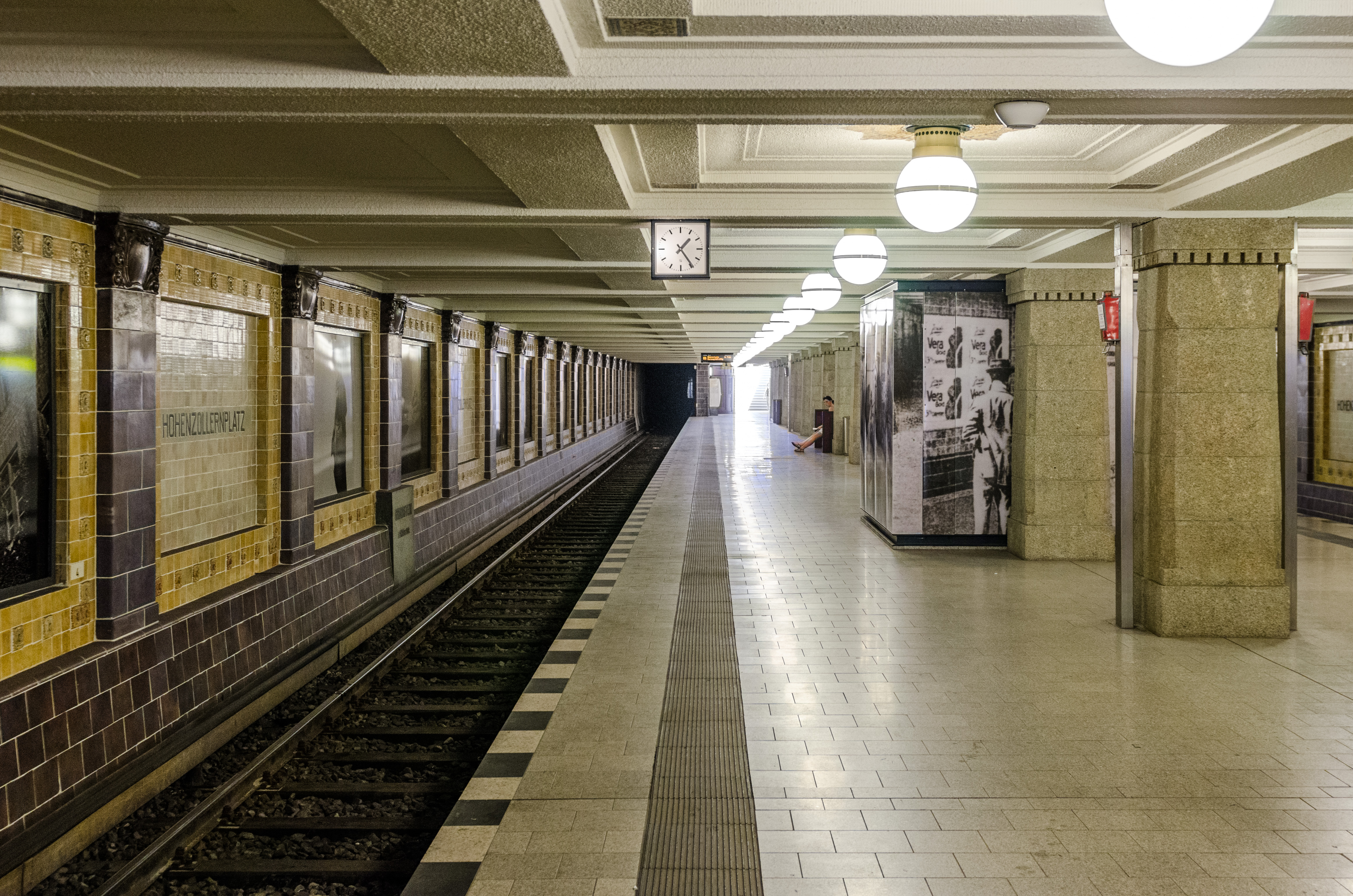
Platform of the station

Hohenzollernplatz is a Berlin U-Bahn station located in the Wilmersdorf district on the U3 line.

The station opened with the first section of the U3 from Wittenbergplatz to Thielplatz on 12 October 1913. As of Heidelberger Platz the architect was Wilhelm Leitgebel.

Preceding station	Berlin U-Bahn	Following station
Fehrbelliner Platz towards Krumme Lanke	U3	Spichernstraße towards Warschauer Straße
