= German submarine U-12 =

U-12 may refer to one of the following German submarines:

- SM U-12 (Germany), was a Type U 9 submarine launched in 1910 and that served in the First World War until sunk on 10 March 1915
  - During the First World War, Germany also had these submarines with similar names:
    - SM UB-12, a Type UB I submarine launched in 1915 and disappeared in August 1918
    - SM UC-12, a Type UC I submarine launched in 1915 and sunk on 16 March 1916; raised by Italy and became Italian submarine X-1;
- German submarine U-12 (1935), a Type IIB submarine that served in the Second World War and was sunk on 8 October 1939
- German submarine U-12 (S191), a Type 205 submarine of the Bundesmarine that was launched in 1969 and decommissioned in 2005
