= Wittenbergplatz station =

Berlin U-Bahn station

Wittenbergplatz
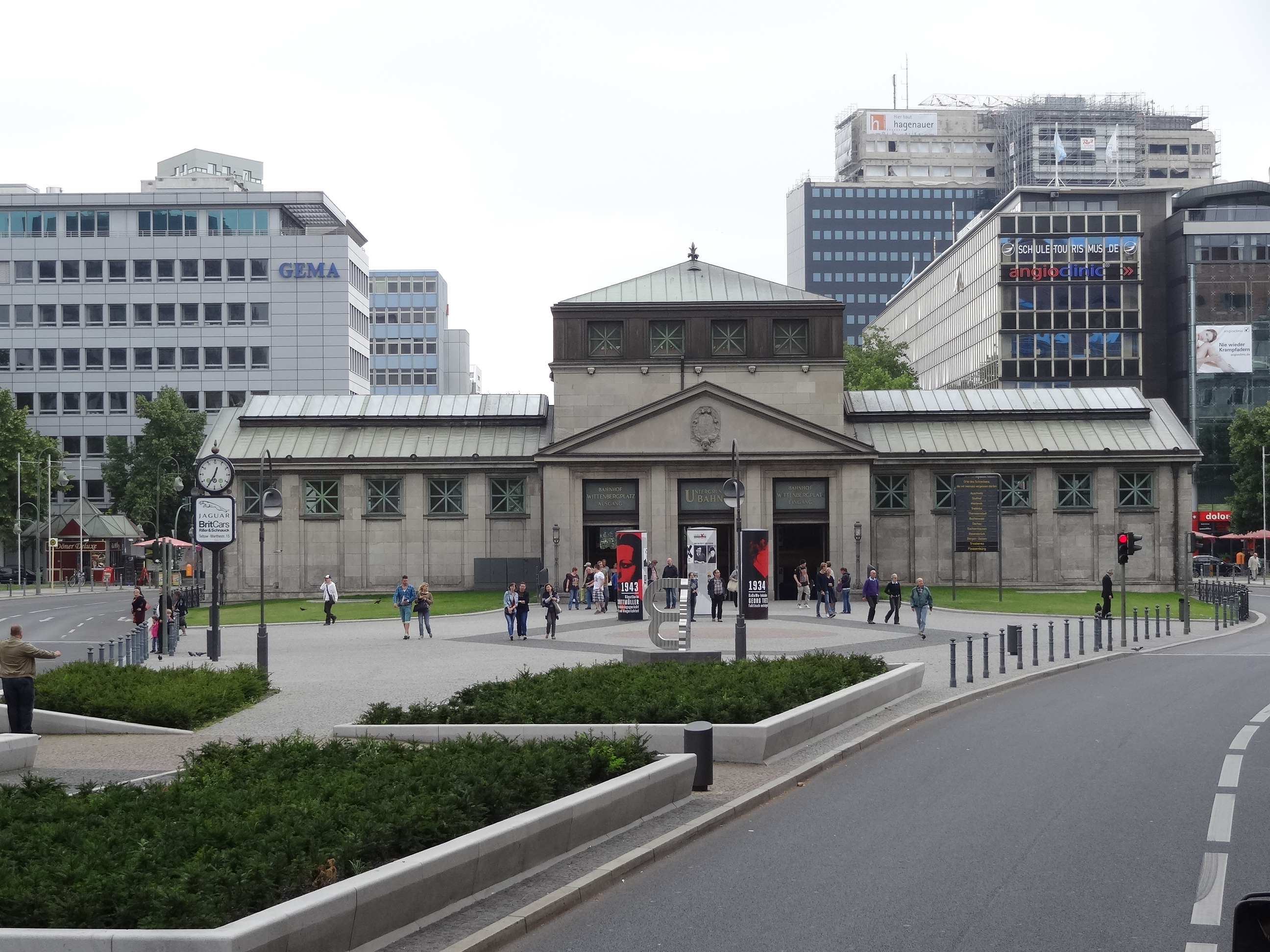
- Entrance building

General information
- Location: Wittenbergplatz/Bayreuther Straße; Schöneberg, Berlin; Germany
- Coordinates: 52°30′07″N 13°20′35″E
- System: Cross-platform interchange
- Owner: Berliner Verkehrsbetriebe
- Operator: Berliner Verkehrsbetriebe
- Platforms: 2 island platforms 1 side platform
- Tracks: 5
- Connections: : N1, N2, N3, N26; : M19, M29, M46

Construction
- Structure type: Underground
- Cycle facilities: Yes
- Accessible: Yes

Other information
- Fare zone: : Berlin A/5555

History
- Opened: 11 March 1902; 124 years ago

Services
| Preceding station | Berlin U-Bahn | Following station |
|---|---|---|
| Kurfürstendamm towards Uhlandstraße | U1 | Nollendorfplatz towards Warschauer Straße |
| Zoologischer Garten towards Ruhleben | U2 | Nollendorfplatz towards Pankow |
| Augsburger Straße towards Krumme Lanke | U3 | Nollendorfplatz towards Warschauer Straße |
Arrangement before Nürnburger Platz Closed
| Nürnberger Platz towards Krumme Lanke | U3 | Nollendorfplatz towards Warschauer Straße |
Route map
Location
- Location within Berlin

Wittenbergplatz is a Berlin U-Bahn station on lines U1, U2, and U3. The station is located at the Wittenbergplatz square in Berlin's City West area, in the northwestern corner of the Schöneberg neighbourhood. It is the only U-Bahn station in the city with five adjacent tracks and three platforms. The station building, erected in 1911–1913 according to plans designed by Alfred Grenander, is listed as an architectural monument.

== History ==
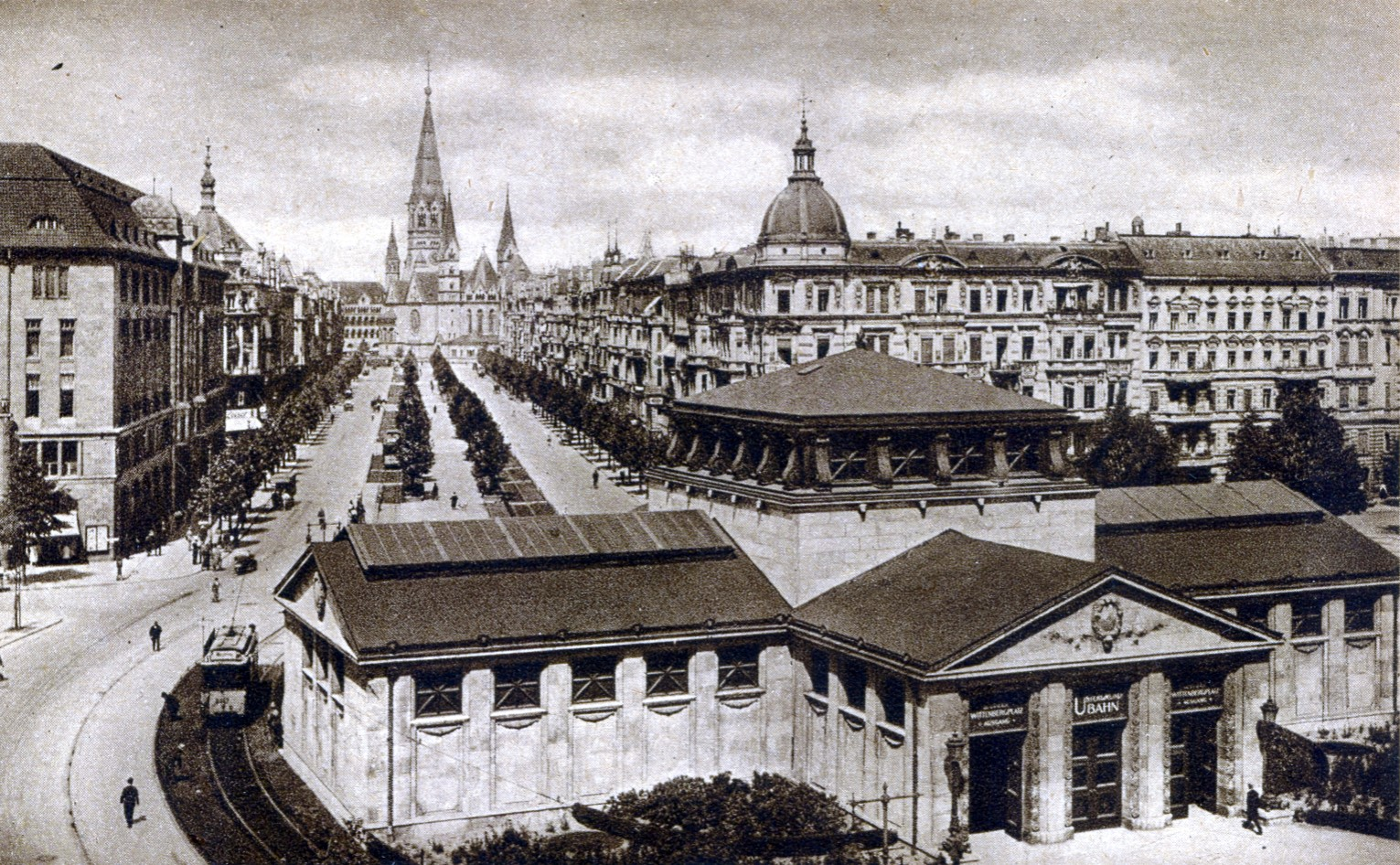
Wittenbergplatz, KaDeWe (left), and Tauentzienstraße, c. 1915

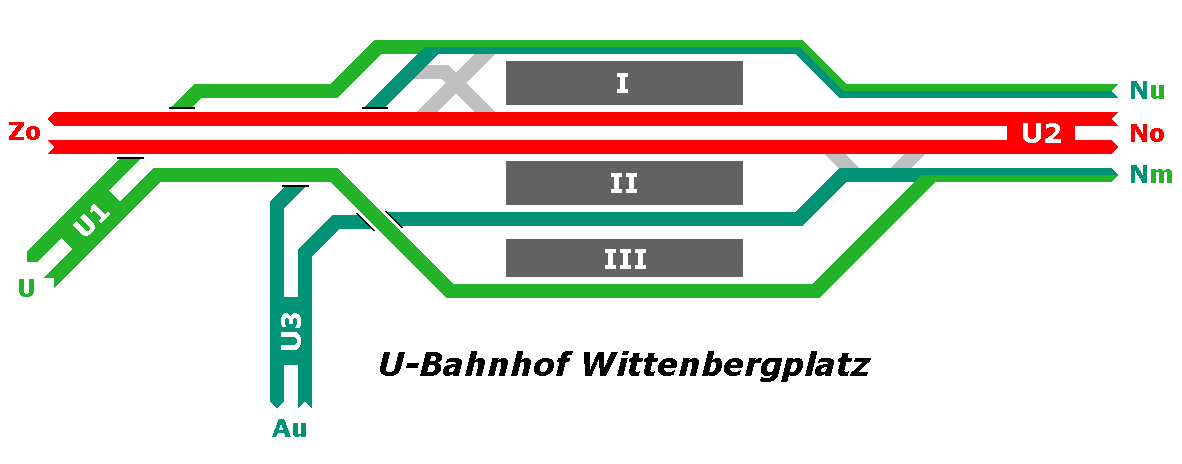
Structure of lines U1, U2 and U3 at Wittenbergplatz.

Wittenbergplatz is one of the oldest U-Bahn stations in Berlin, opened on 11 March 1902 with the first Stammstrecke (present-day U1) line running under the eponymous square and adjacent to Tauentzienstraße, today one of the major shopping streets in Berlin. Initially a common underground station with two tracks and two side platforms, it was completely refurbished as an interchange from 1910 onwards. The new station serving three U-Bahn lines opened on 1 December 1912 with two island platforms and one side platform, serving five tracks on one underground level and under a single roof.

The remarkable entrance hall in the centre of Wittenbergplatz, designed in an Art Nouveau style by Alfred Grenander, was finished in 1913; spanning over all three platforms, it reflected the prestigious building of the large KaDeWe department store across the street. The station building was badly damaged during the bombing of Berlin in World War II and reconstructed afterwards. Wittenbergplatz quickly became one of the most frequented stations of the West Berlin urban traffic network, though after the building of the Berlin Wall the present-day U2 to Nollendorfplatz was closed in 1972 and not re-opened until 1993. From 1980 to 1983 the station was renovated in line with the precepts of monument perception by architect Borchardt. He won the prize (gold medal) of the Ministry of Architecture in 1986.

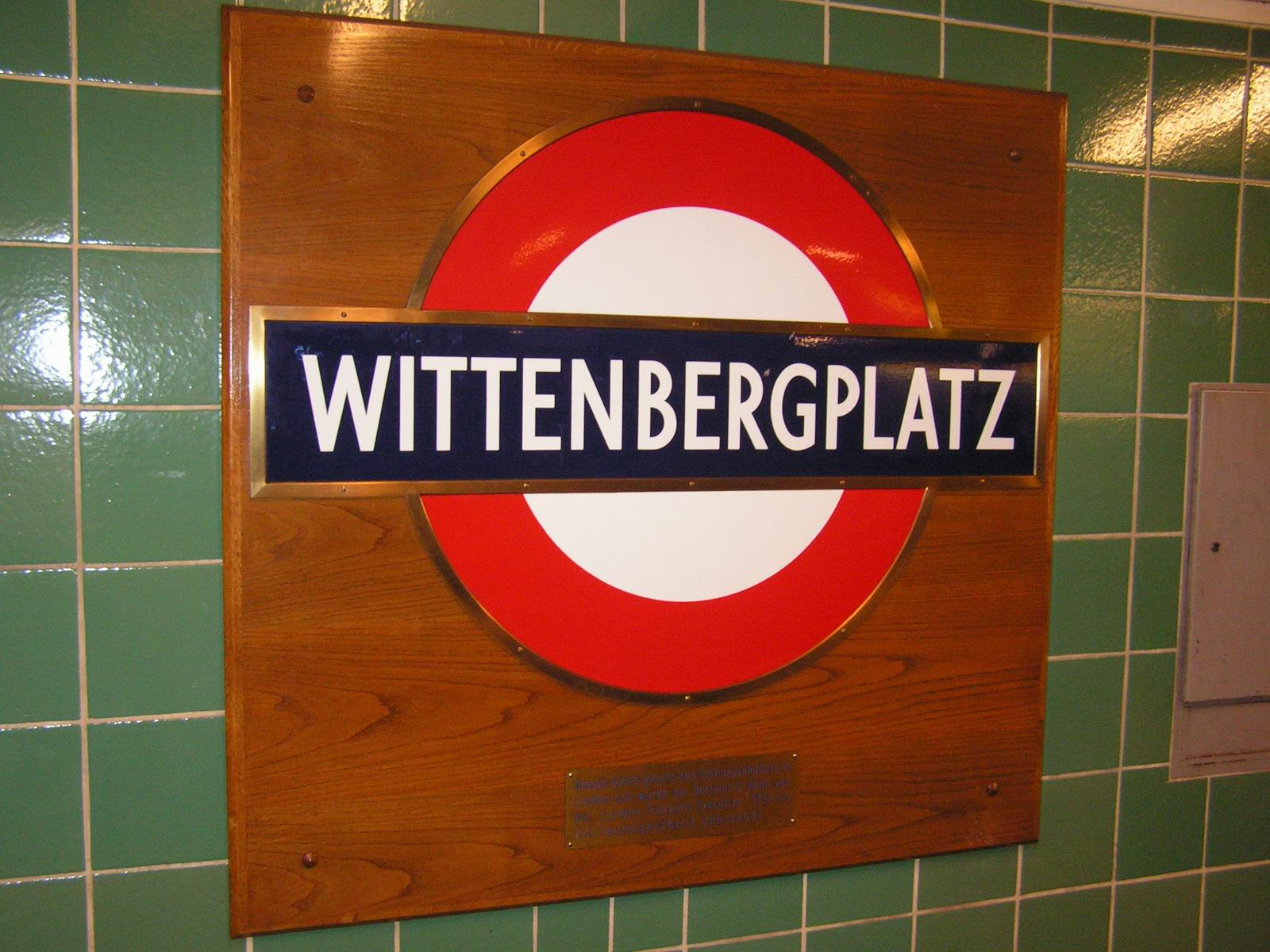
A sign at the station in the form of an iconic London Underground roundel

Platform 1 features a sign donated by the London Transport Executive in 1952 to commemorate the 50th anniversary of the U-Bahn. It features the station's name in the distinctive red-and-blue roundel used on the London Underground.
