= Uhlandstraße station (Berlin U-Bahn) =

Station of the Berlin U-Bahn

Uhlandstraße
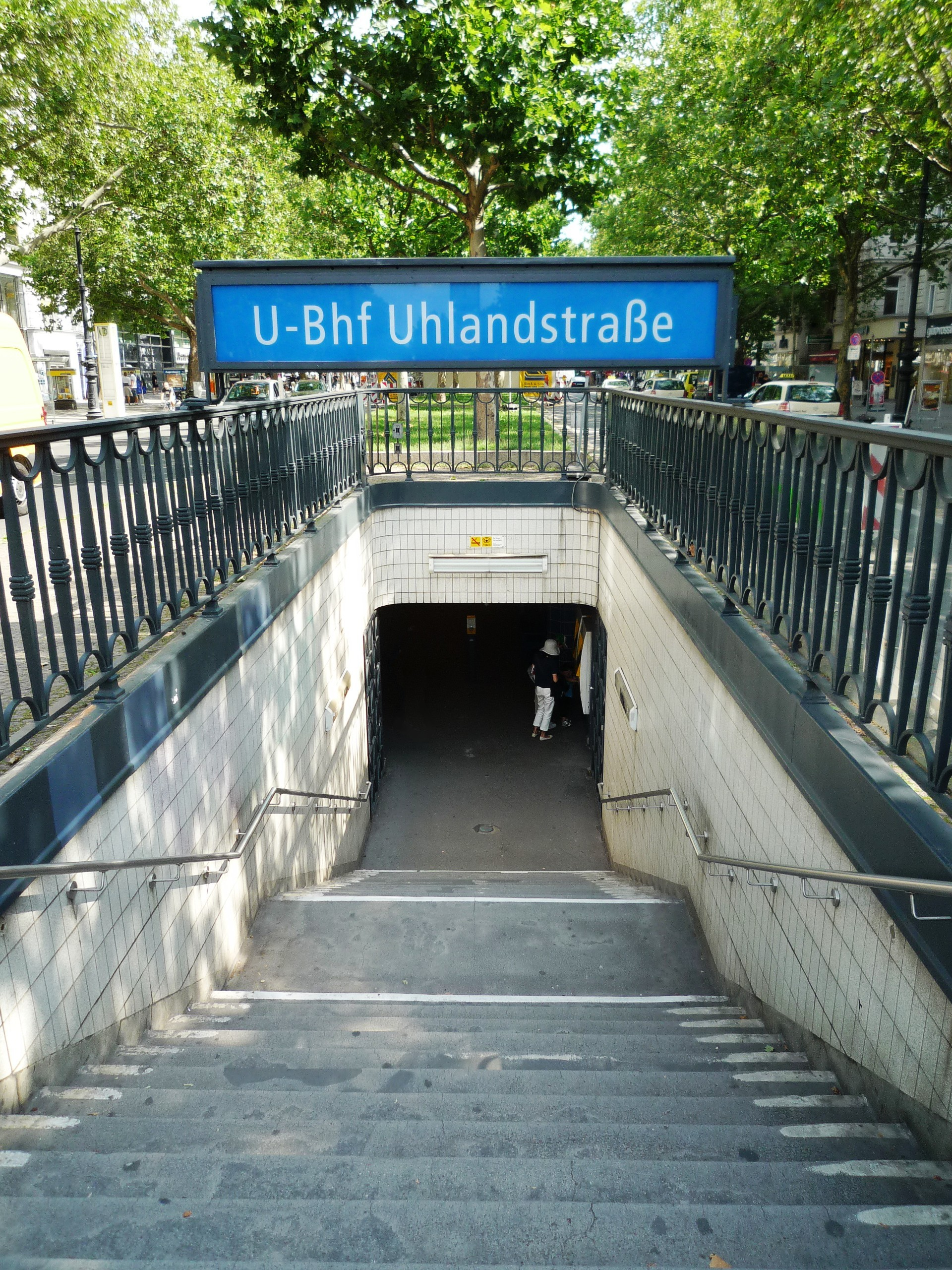
- Entrance on Kurfürstendamm

General information
- Location: Kurfürstendamm/Uhlandstraße; Charlottenburg, Berlin; Germany
- Coordinates: 52°30′09″N 13°19′32″E
- Owner: Berliner Verkehrsbetriebe
- Operator: Berliner Verkehrsbetriebe
- Platforms: 1 island platform
- Tracks: 2
- Connections: : 109, 110, X10, N10; : M19, M29

Construction
- Structure type: Underground
- Cycle facilities: Yes
- Accessible: Yes

Other information
- Fare zone: : Berlin A/5555

History
- Opened: 12 October 1913; 113 years ago

Services
Preceding station	Berlin U-Bahn	Following station
Terminus	U1	Kurfürstendamm towards Warschauer Straße
Route map
Location
- Location within Berlin Location within Germany Location within Europe

Uhlandstraße is the western terminus station of line U1 of the Berlin U-Bahn. It is located on Kurfürstendamm in the central Charlottenburg quarter of Berlin, among a mix of chain and high end shopping facilities.

== History ==
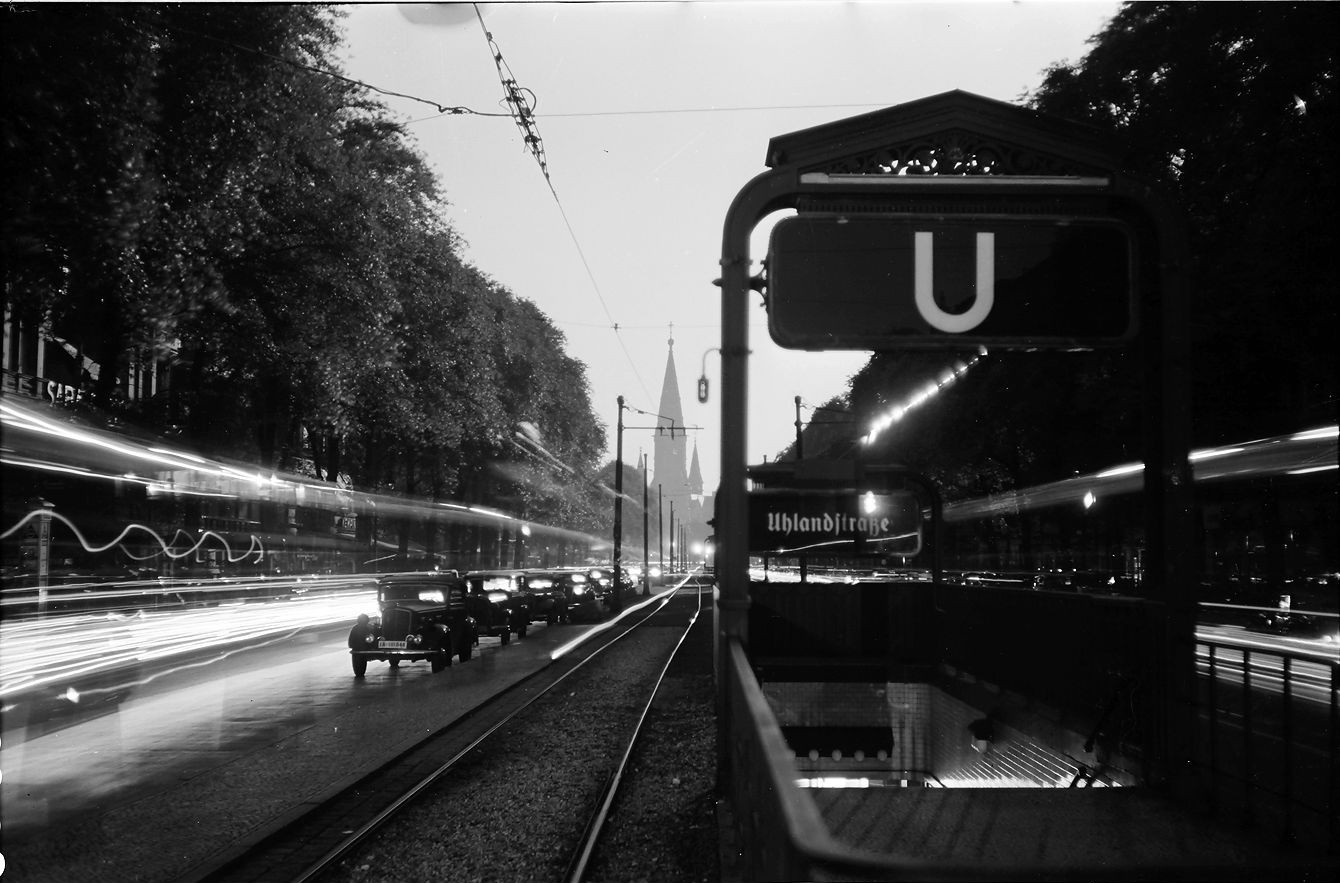
Uhlandstraße station, 1937

The station opened on 12 October 1913 at the intersection of Kurfürstendamm and Uhlandstraße, named after the poet Ludwig Uhland. Built according to plans designed by Alfred Grenander, it was meant to be the first section of a projected metro line connecting Wittenbergplatz with Berlin-Halensee station which was never built.

Damaged by the bombing of Berlin in World War II, the station was closed briefly in 1945; it went out of service again for four years in 1957, because of the construction of the neighbouring Kurfürstendamm station. From 1970, trains only went to Wittenbergplatz station (1.2 kilometres (0.75 mi), length) but since 1993 trains have run to Warschauer Straße station again. The second entrance at the eastern end of the station, at the junction of Kurfürstendamm and Fasanenstraße, was closed in 1964, but re-opened in 2005.

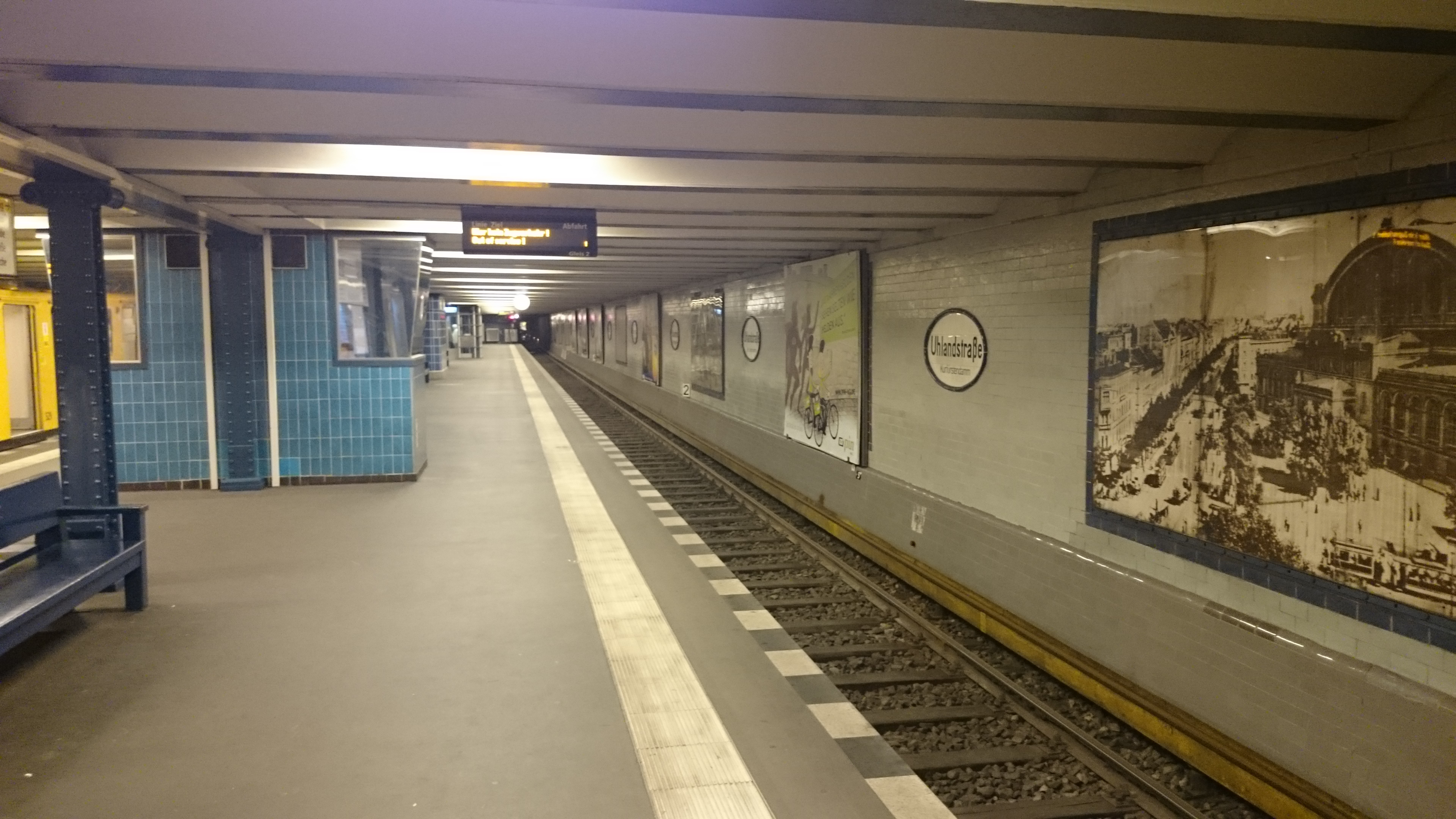
Platform

Today, the area is somewhat reminiscent of the period of promoterism (Gründerzeit) and the Wirtschaftswunder days of the 1950s. Quiet, green roads with mostly expensive flats make the area one of the most desirable but unaffordable in Berlin, comparable for instance to the area between Westminster and Kensington in London.
