= Warschauer Straße station (Berlin U-Bahn) =

Station of the Berlin U-Bahn

Warschauer Straße
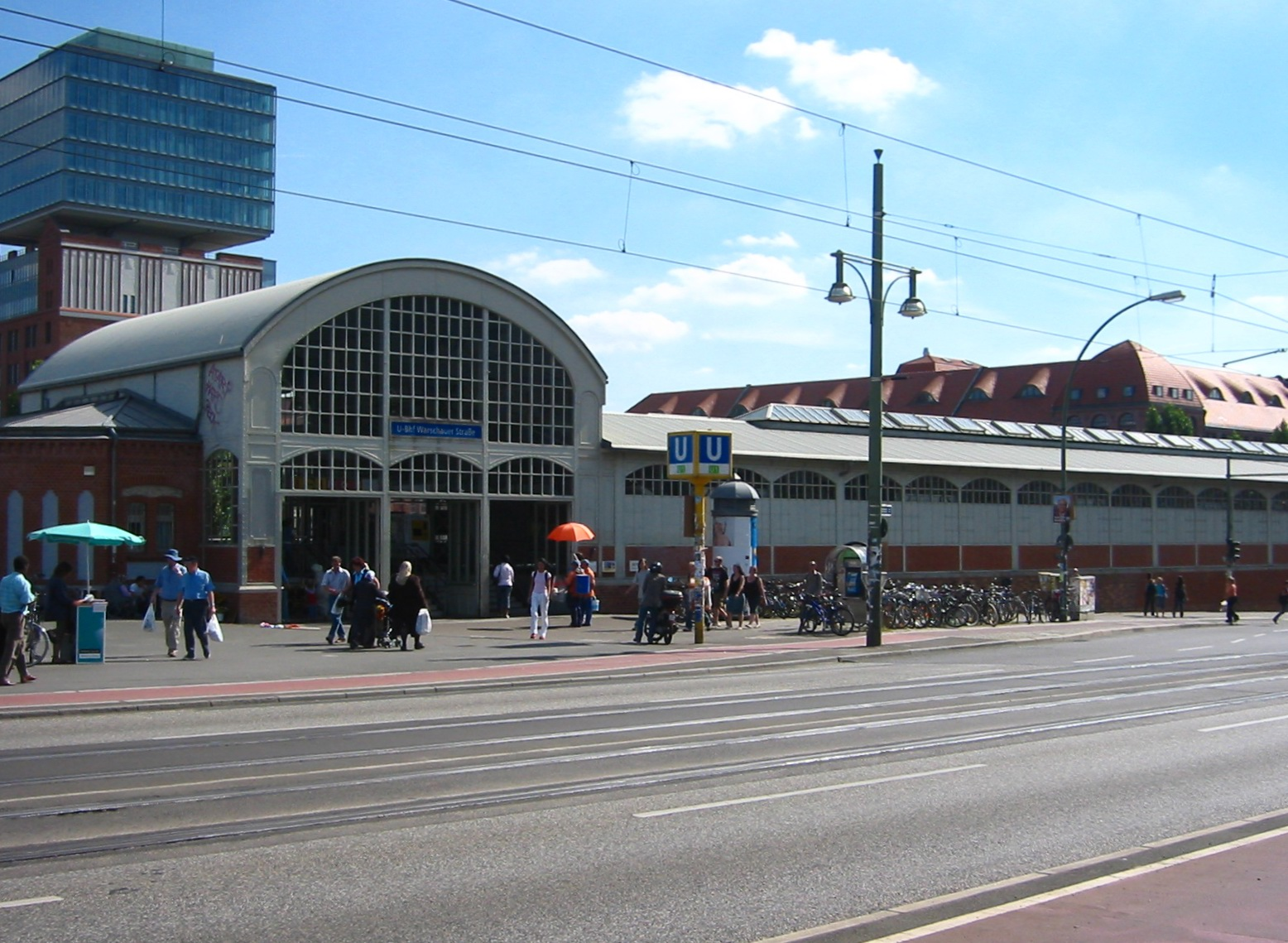

General information
- Location: Warschauer Straße 36; Friedrichshain, Berlin; Germany
- Coordinates: 52.5051°N 13.4491°E
- Owner: Berliner Verkehrsbetriebe
- Operator: Berliner Verkehrsbetriebe
- Platforms: 1 island platform 1 side platform
- Tracks: 4
- Connections: : 300, 347, N1

Construction
- Structure type: Elevated
- Cycle facilities: Yes
- Accessible: No

Other information
- Station code: 6550
- Fare zone: : Berlin A/5555
- Website: Official website

History
- Opened: 17 August 1902; 124 years ago

Services
Preceding station	Berlin U-Bahn	Following station
Schlesisches Tor towards Uhlandstraße	U1	Terminus
Schlesisches Tor towards Krumme Lanke	U3	Terminus
Route map
Location
- Location within Berlin

Warschauer Straße is the eastern terminus station of lines U1 and U3 of the Berlin U-Bahn.

== History ==
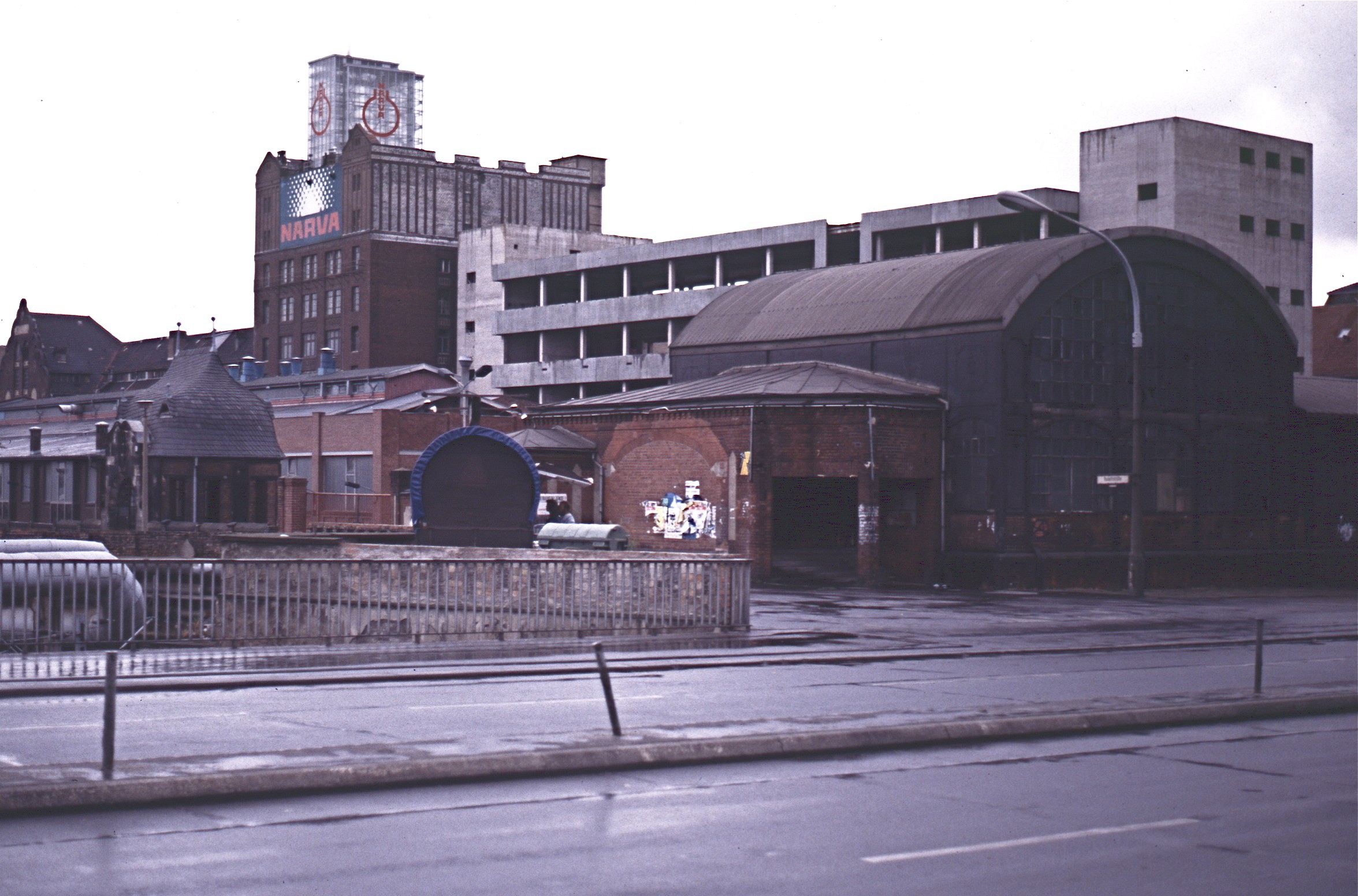
Entrance to the abandoned U-Bahn Warschauer Brücke, 1992

Designed by Paul Wittig under contract with Siemens & Halske and opened on 17 August 1902 under the name Warschauer Brücke, the station was the first station of the Berlin elevated railway. The station consists of a 360 meter long and 26 meter wide brick viaduct.

The station was closed at the end of World War II and did not open again until 14 October 1945. Since the U-Bahn station is the only station of the U1 located in the eastern part of the city, it was closed again in 1961 due to the construction of the Berlin Wall.

Following German reunification in 1990, the station underwent extensive reconstruction and was reopened on 14 October 1995. At the same time it was renamed Warschauer Straße in order to create uniformity with the adjacent Berlin S-Bahn station located 150 metres away.

In 1914, Berlin's elevated rail company planned to extend the rail line east to Frankfurter Allee to the location of today's Frankfurter Tor U-Bahn station. However, World War I and its aftermath prevented the execution of these plans. In 2011, Berlin city transport planners excluded such an extension in their development plan. At the same time, any plans to move the U-Bahn station to create a single interchange station were shelved. Instead, the Berlin Senate plans an extension of a footbridge linking the two stations.

== Nearby landmarks ==
The Oberbaumbrücke, the East Side Gallery, and Mercedes-Benz Arena (former O2 World arena) can be reached on foot. Three discothèques are located in the basement vaults of the U-Bahn building: The Matrix Club, since 1996, one of the biggest venues in Berlin with up to nine bars and five dancefloors, the Narva Lounge and the Busche.
