= Krumme Lanke =

Lake and neighborhood in Berlin, Germany

Coordinates: 52°27′0″N 13°13′52″E

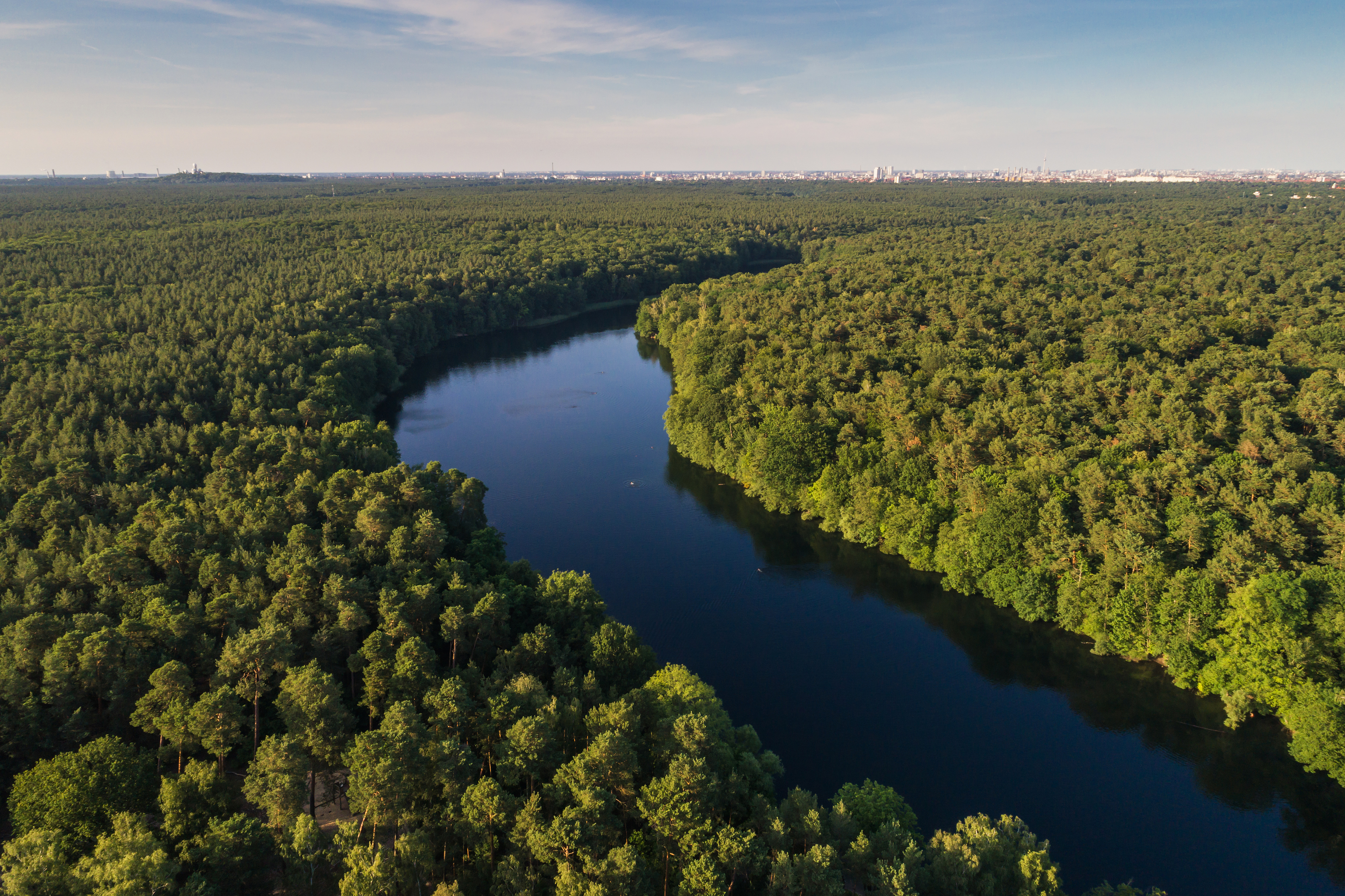
Aerial view of Krumme Lanke

Krumme Lanke is a lake in the south west of Berlin, in the Steglitz-Zehlendorf borough of the city and on the edge of the Grunewald forest. After Nikolassee and the neighbouring Schlachtensee, it is the southernmost of the Grunewald chain of lakes.

Adjacent to the lake is Waldsiedlung Krumme Lanke, a neighborhood built by the Nazis designed to embody Nazi ideology, with cellars designed to serve as bomb shelters.

== Overview ==
To the north east, the Riemeistersee flows into the Riemeisterfenn nature reserve, the Langes Luch nature reserve, the Grunewaldsee and ultimately the Hundekehlesee. Krumme Lanke is 1,100m long with a circumference of 2.5 km, is up to 6.6m deep and has a surface area of 154,000m². A path running along the edge of the lake is popular with joggers and walkers. There are also two bathing spots on the lake, one of which is used for naturism. There is also an exercise area for dogs on the northern bank, although this is currently overgrown. Unlike other lakes in the area, which contain eels, tench, pike, carp, catfish and perch, the Krumme Lanke is home only to asp.

On the northern bank is a memorial to Sergeant Fritz Göhrs, who was killed there in 1928. Whilst riding around the lake, Göhrs' horse was startled and threw him into the lake. The horse then fell on top of him and Göhrs drowned.

Around a kilometre from the lake is the Krumme Lanke station of the Berlin U-Bahn, on the U3.

== History ==
=== Crumense ===
Having already bought the then villages of Zehlendorf, Schlachtensee and Nikolassee in 1242, the monks of the influential Cistercian Lehnin Abbey sought nine years later to expand their estate further north into Teltow. In 1251, they bought the village of Crumense by the Krumme Lanke for one hundred and fifty marks from the Ascanian Margraves Johann I and Otto III, who ruled the area together. As the village is not recorded in the Land Book of Charles IV of 1375, it is very likely that the village was abandoned soon after the purchase.Excavations in the abandoned site uncovered remnants of Slavic pottery, it is thought the settlement was originally a Slavonic foundation. Crumense in Middle Low German indicates a site by a crooked lake, meaning the village was named after the lake. There are references to the lake itself in documents from 1543 and 1591, in which it is referred to as the Krummensee.

=== SS colony ===
Between 1938 and 1940, the GAGFAH property company built an SS colony by the Krumme Lanke. The firm worked in co-operation with the Office for Race and Settlement to create what Reichsführer of the SS Heinrich Himmler called "a closed community for the officers of the SS." It is now a sought-after neighborhood in the German capital.

Since 1945, almost all of the streets have been renamed: Sigstraße was renamed Bürstadter Weg (after the town in southern Hesse); Treuepfad became Alsbacher Weg (the name of several places in Germany); and Ahnenzeile became Jugenheimer Weg (after Jugenheim in Rheinhessen). The name of one street, Im Kinderland (In the land of children) remained. The name was suggested by the wife of an SS officer, on the grounds that "the men, who represent the racial elite of the German people, pass on their high-quality genetic material to a large number of genetically wealthy offspring."

== Music ==
- In 1923, Berliner folk singer Fredy Sieg wrote Das Lied von der Krummen Lanke (The Song of Krumme Lanke).
- In 1973, the quartet, Insterburg & Co., sang about the Krumme Lanke in song of that title on their album, Die Hohe Schule der Musik (The High School for Music).
- Indie artist Ducktails included an instrumental on his album St. Catherine by the name Krumme Lanke.

== See also ==
- Krumme Lanke (Berlin U-Bahn)
