= Oskar-Helene-Heim station =

Station of the Berlin U-Bahn

Coordinates: 52°27′01″N 13°15′58″E

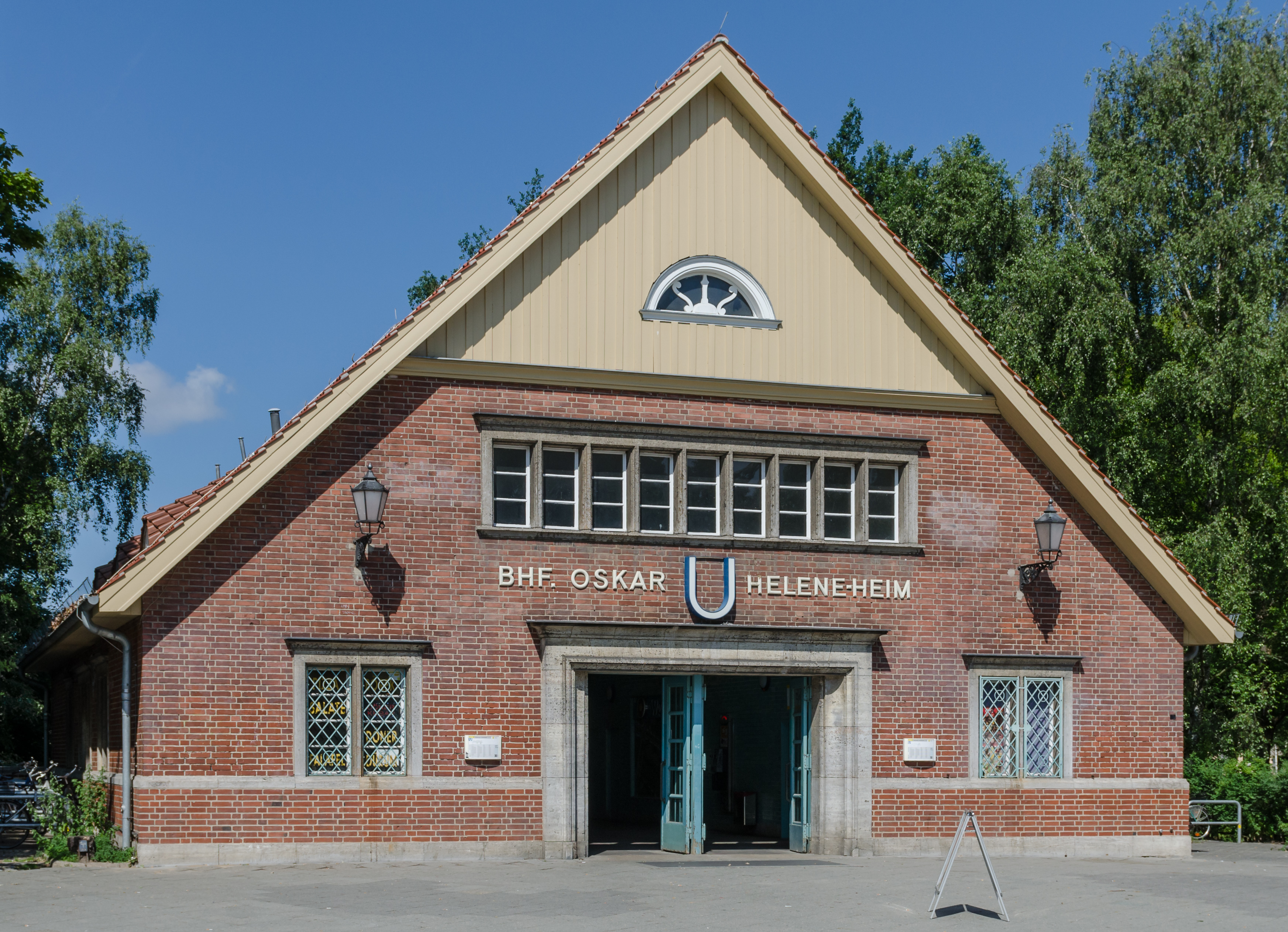
Entrance hall on Clayallee

Oskar-Helene-Heim is an U-Bahn station in Berlin, located in the southwestern Dahlem district on the U3 line.

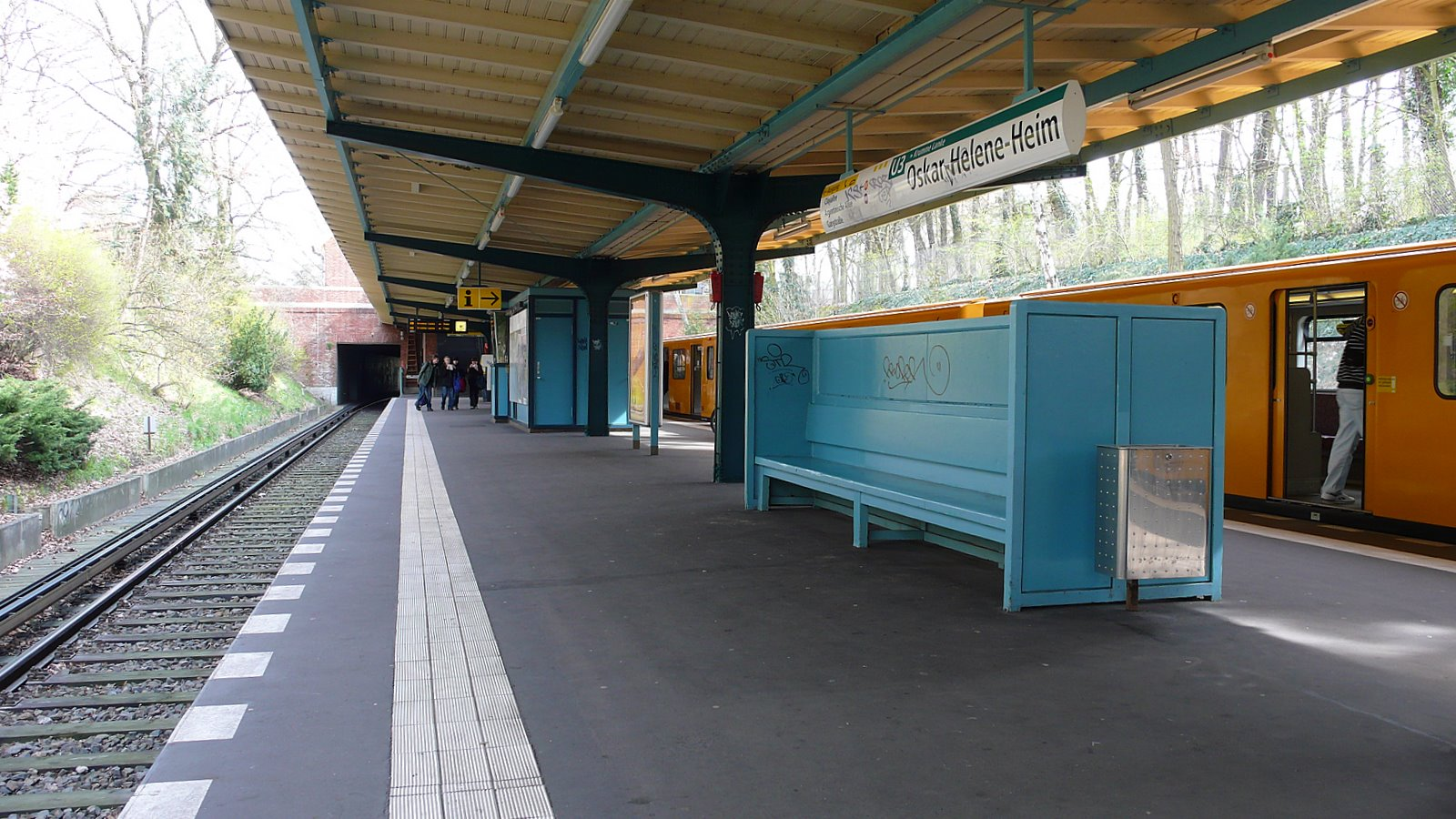
Platform of the station

The station was inaugurated on 22 December 1929 with the last surface section of the line to Krumme Lanke station. It was named after a nearby orthopedic hospital, a foundation of Oskar Pintsch (1844–1912), son of industrialist Julius Pintsch, and his wife Helene (1857–1923). The clinic, opened in 1914, became a pioneering institution caring for people with physical disabilities and invalids of World War I. Numerous up-to-date neurosurgery techniques were developed here, as well as new methods of treating rickets with UV irradiation, based on the studies of practising doctor Kurt Huldschinsky. The facility closed in 2000.

Today Oskar-Helene-Heim is the closest U-Bahn station to the United States Consulate, part of the former US Army headquarters in West Berlin, which is located nearby on Clayallee The Allied Museum, documenting the local history of the Western Allies in the Cold War era, is nearby.

Preceding station	Berlin U-Bahn	Following station
Onkel Toms Hütte towards Krumme Lanke	U3	Freie Universität (Thielplatz) towards Warschauer Straße
