= Podbielskiallee station =

Station of the Berlin U-Bahn

Coordinates: 52°27′51″N 13°17′45″E

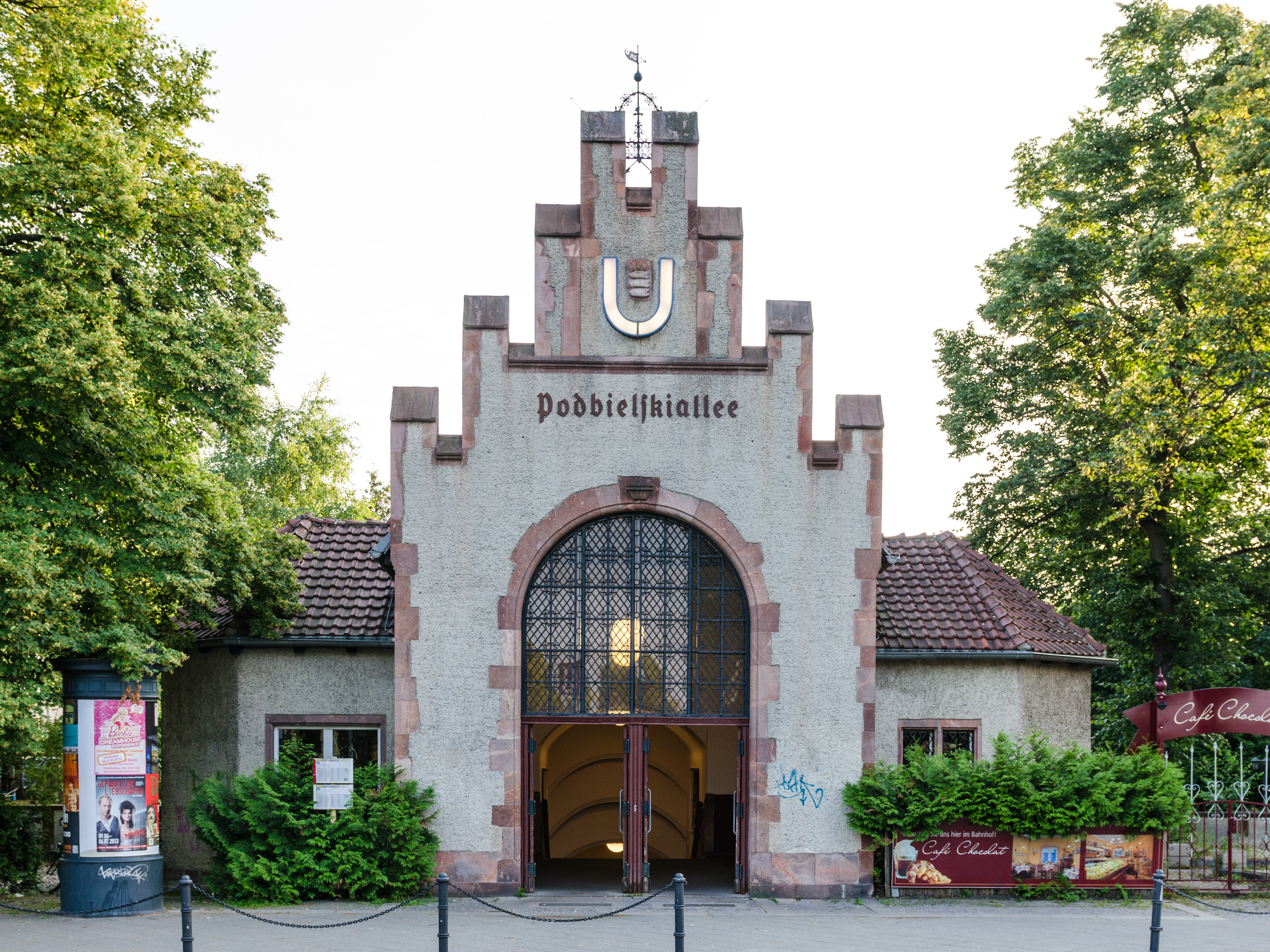
Entrance building

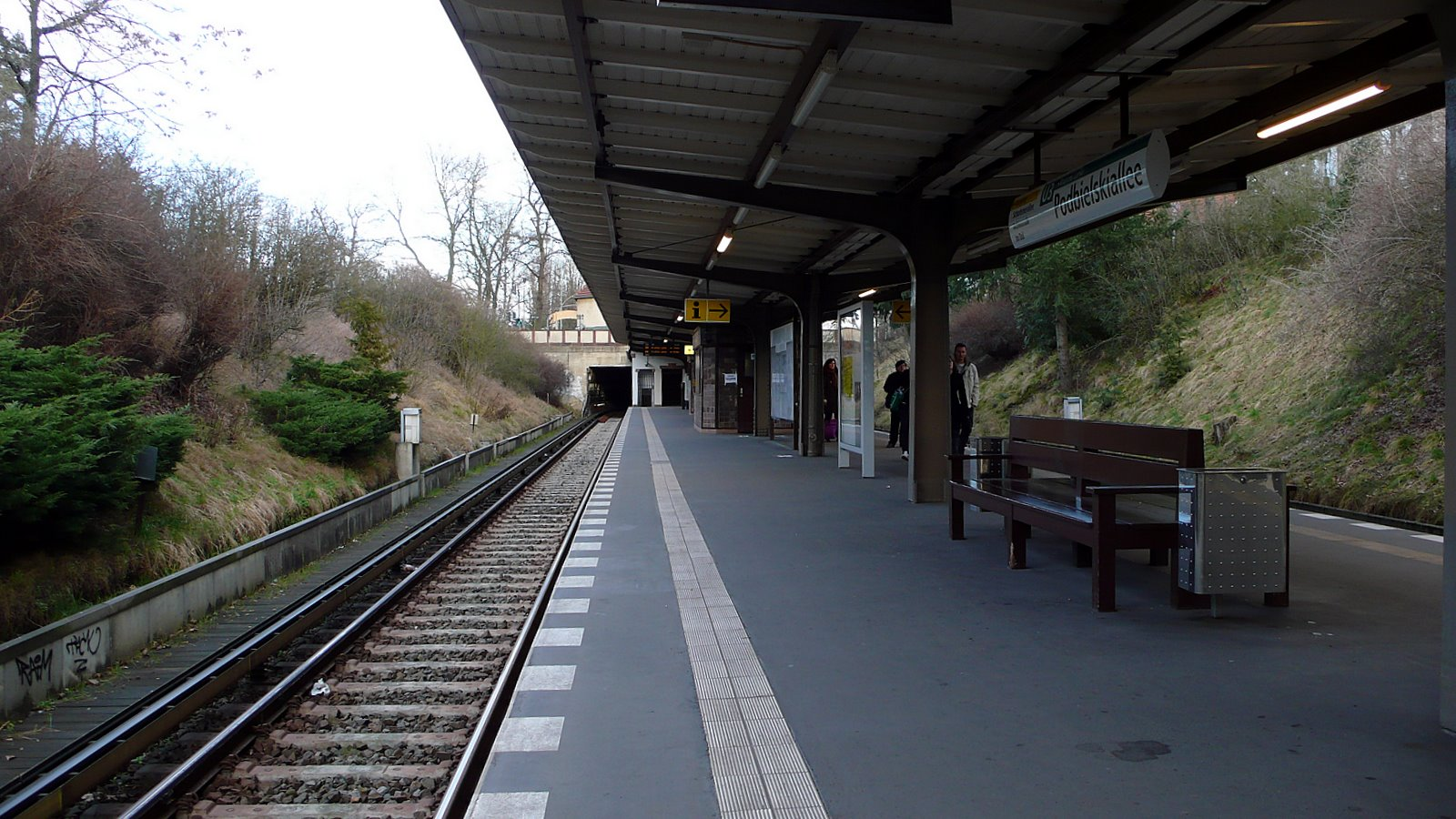
Platform view

Podbielskiallee is an underground railway station in the German capital city of Berlin. It is part of the Berlin U-Bahn network and located in the Dahlem district on the U3 line.

== History ==
The station opened on 12 October 1913 (architect was H.Schweitzer). The street was named after Prussian Minister of State Victor von Podbielski (1844–1916), son of General Eugen Anton Theophil von Podbielski.

It was destroyed in the Battle of Berlin.

The platform was roofed over in 1978, before only a part of it was under the roof. The U3 trains towards Krumme Lanke emerge above ground after Breitenbachplatz.

Preceding station	Berlin U-Bahn	Following station
Dahlem-Dorf towards Krumme Lanke	U3	Breitenbachplatz towards Warschauer Straße
