= Freie Universität (Thielplatz) station =

Station of the Berlin U-Bahn

Coordinates: 52°27′04″N 13°16′55″E

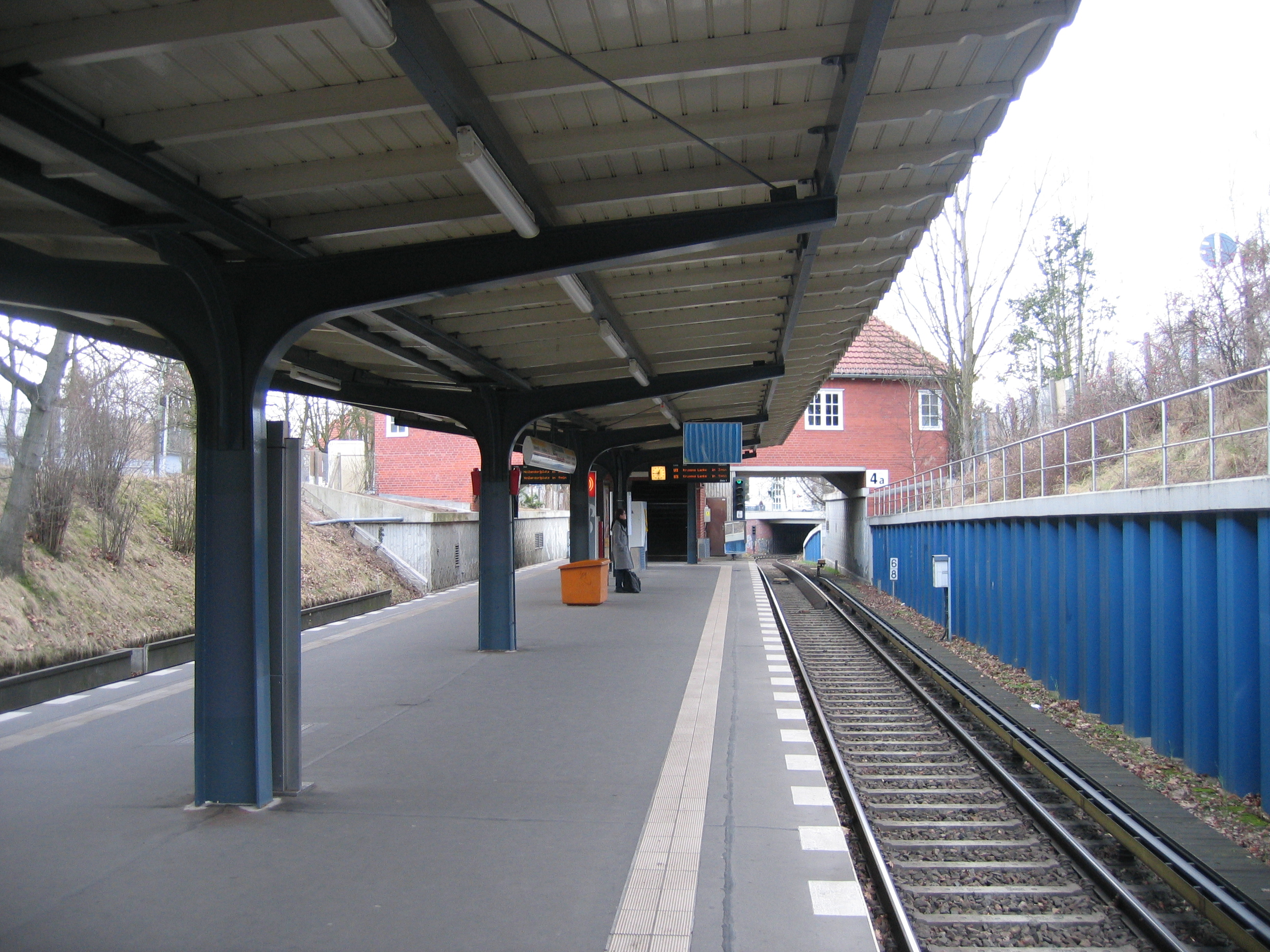
South-east view of the platform

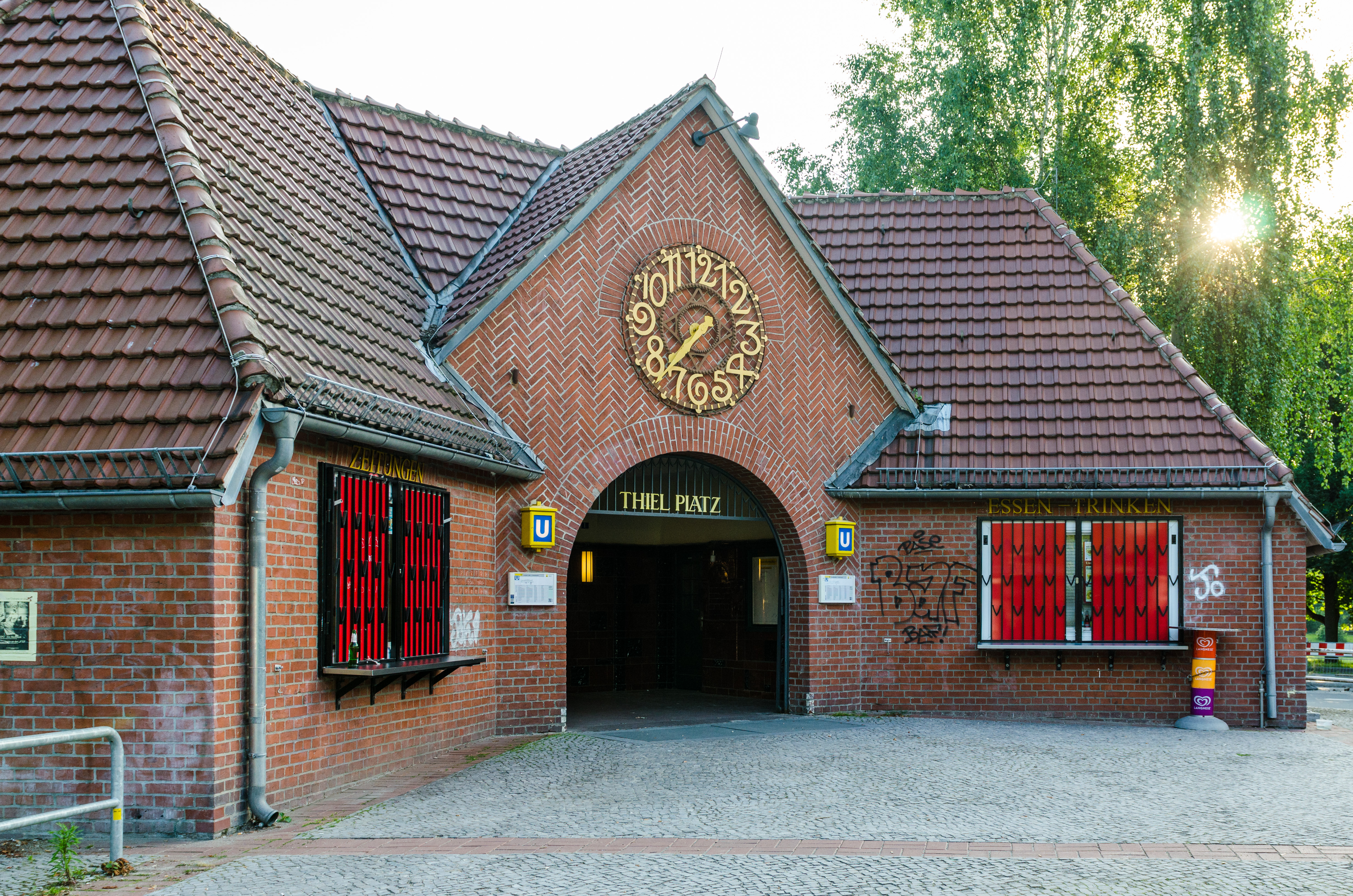
Entrance of the station

Freie Universität (Thielplatz) is a Berlin U-Bahn station located in the Dahlem district on the U3. It is one of two main stations to reach the nearby Freie Universität Berlin and the Fritz Haber Institute of the Max Planck Society. It was opened on 12 October 1913 (designed by H.Straumer) and until 1929 was the southwestern terminus of the line. In 1980, a second entrance was built. In December 2016 the station was renamed from "Thielplatz" to "Freie Universität (Thielplatz)"

Preceding station	Berlin U-Bahn	Following station
Oskar-Helene-Heim towards Krumme Lanke	U3	Dahlem-Dorf towards Warschauer Straße
