= Dahlem Manor =

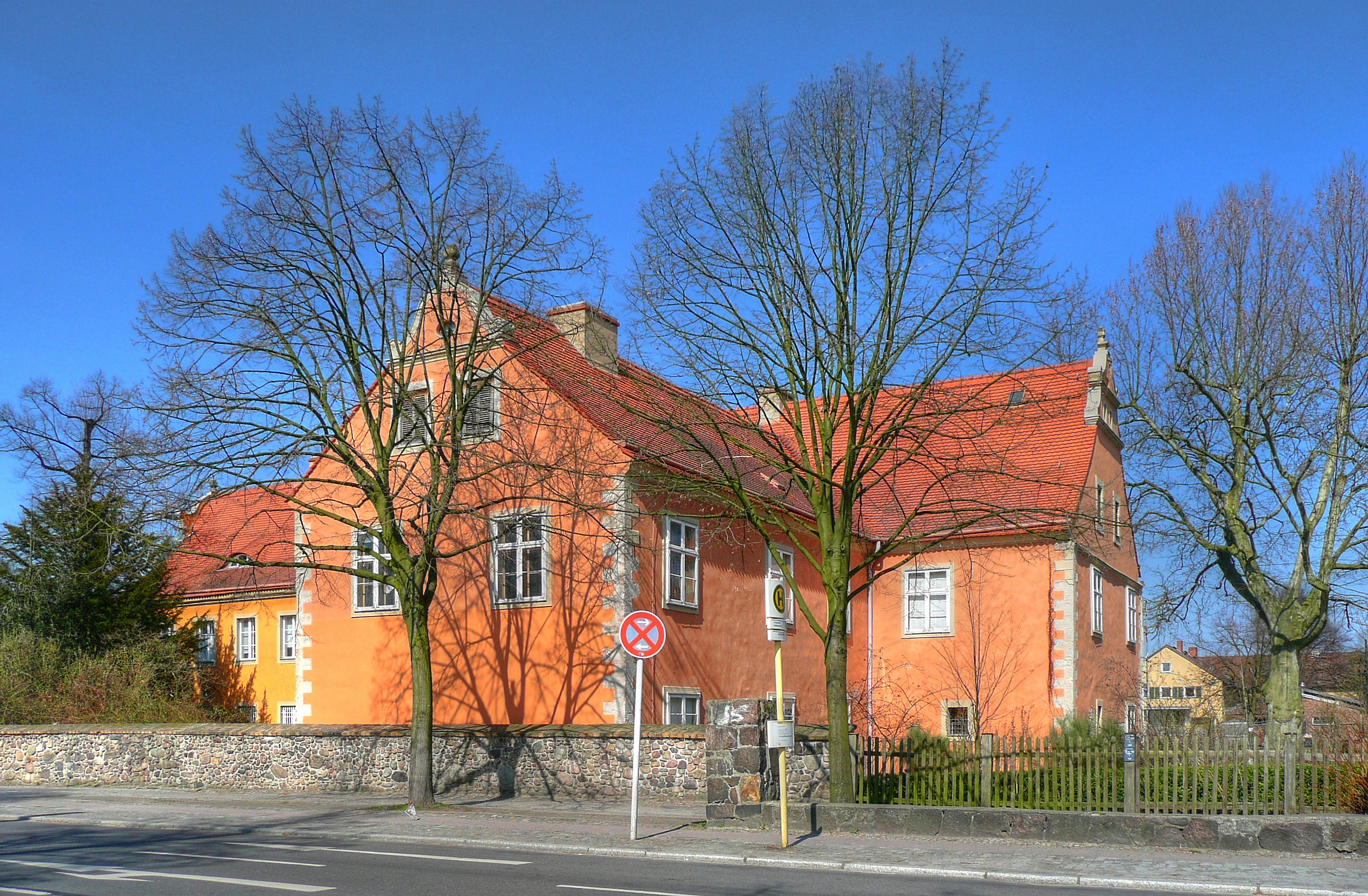
- Location: Dahlem, Berlin, Germany
- Coordinates: 52°27′32″N 13°17′20″E
- Type: Open-air museum
- Website: www.domaene-dahlem.de

The Dahlem Manor (German: Domäne Dahlem) is an open-air museum for agriculture and food culture in southwestern Berlin. It is the historical manor of the former village of Dahlem. The manor has been in service for over 800 years.

== History ==
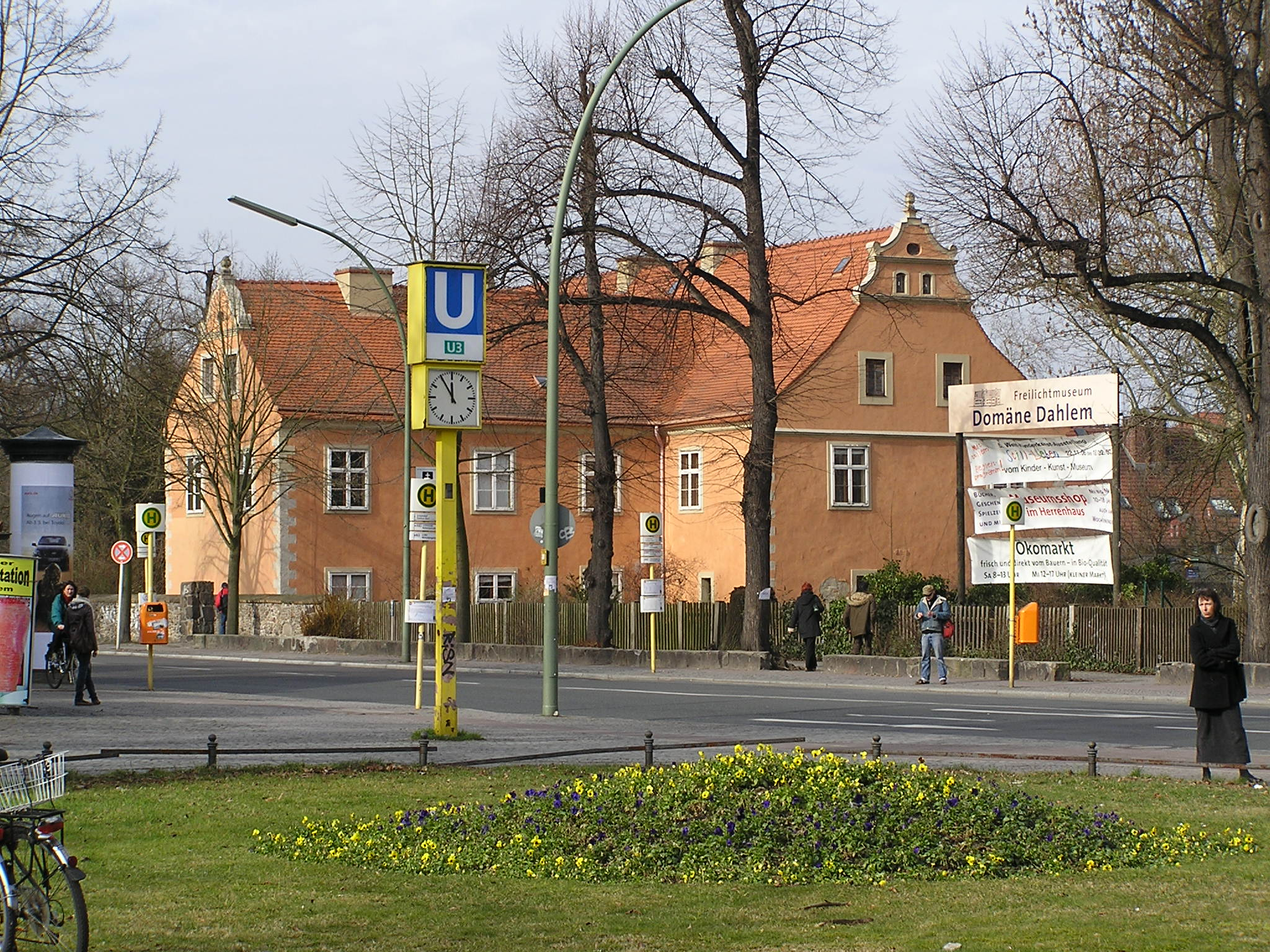
Dahlem Manor seen from the Dahlem-Dorf U-Bahn station

The manor's final owner, Carl Friedrich von Beyme, died in 1838. His daughter, Charlotte Gerlach, sold the manor in 1841 to the Prussian government.

The first plans to repurpose the manor lands were made in the middle of the 19th century, but were stalled by Otto von Camphausen and other community leaders. These plans returned to the forefront by the end of the century, as the city rapidly expanded around the manor. The first settlement in the area was the Botanical Garden, in a location now occupied by the Heinrich-von-Kleist Park. The Prussian Landtag finally approved the plans for the manor on June 26, 1897.

Beginning in 1901, the surrounding fields and forest lands were converted into building plots. Part of the land was to be used for public projects (science and research), while another part was to be sold as land for villas to private buyers. The converted area began in the northeast (near today's Breitenbachplatz), running along Under den Eichen street up to the village of Zehlendorf. In the west and northwest parts of the royal Grunewald were included in the project as well. With the express aim of boosting property values in the area, a new train line was built linking the area to Berlin (today the U3 line). The new streets in the area were named after various Prussian ministers and forestry officials.

The natural science faculty of Humboldt University were also assigned a new location in the area, somewhat relieving the crowded Berlin-Mitte campus. The beginning of World War I brought these plans to a halt. Nearly 40 years later, after the end of World War II, the planned science center was finally built on the campus of the Free University of Berlin. The planned buildings include several institutes of the Kaiser Wilhelm Society (on Van't-Hoff-Straße), the Prussian Privy State Archives, several agricultural research buildings, and the Museum of Asian Art.

The Dahlem Museum Center was gradually built out at the same time, in particular because the museum center on the Museum Island was no longer accessible from West Berlin after the war. Some of the facilities have since been relocated to the Kulturforum (e.g., the Gemäldegalerie). An extensive relocation to the Humboldt Forum in the inner city is planned.

=== Agricultural use ===
Some of the manor lands continued to be used for agriculture throughout the reallocation. The only remaining farmland — where the museum stands today — is at Königin-Luise-Straße 49.

== Current use ==
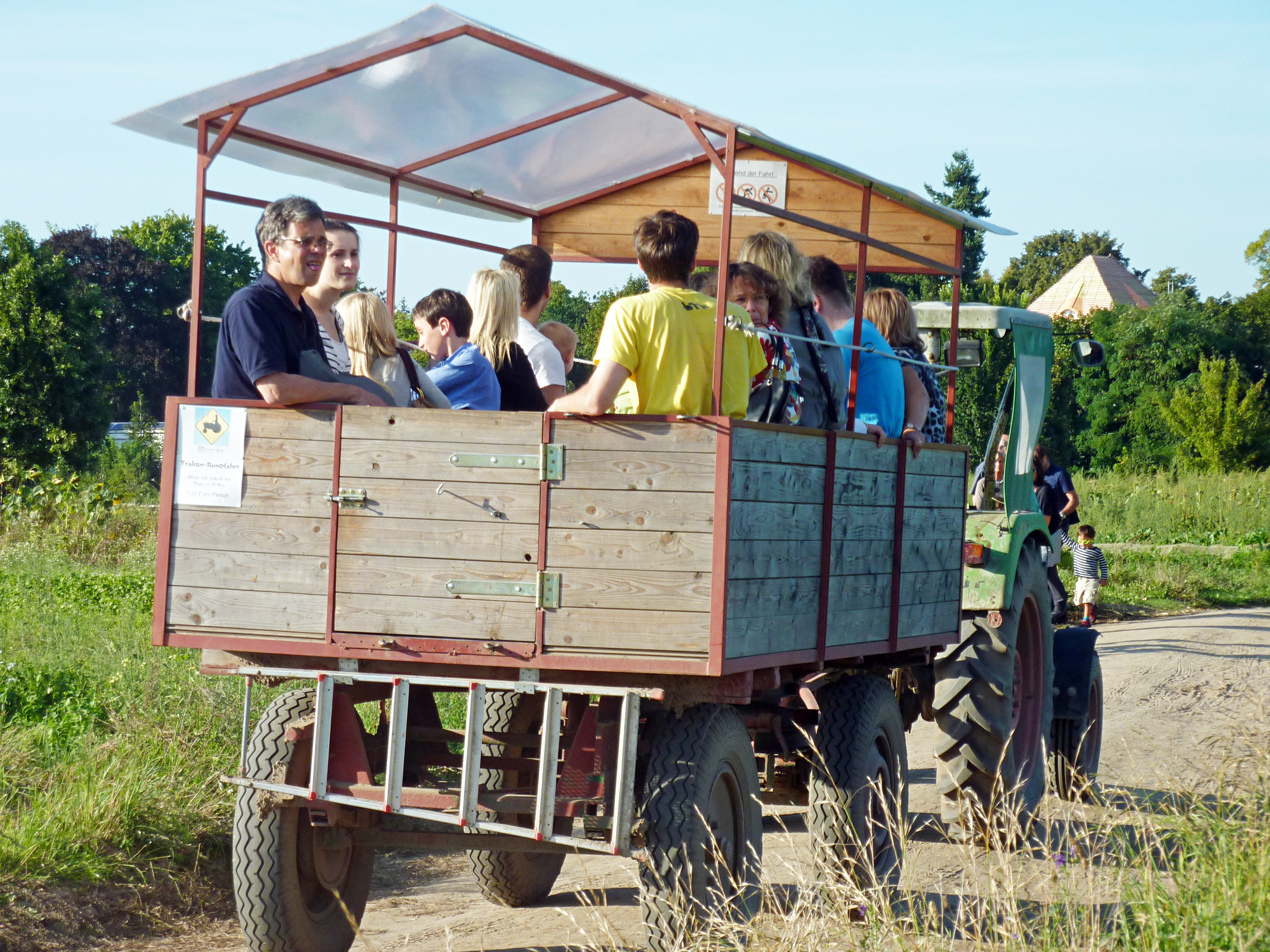
Tractor ride on the manor field

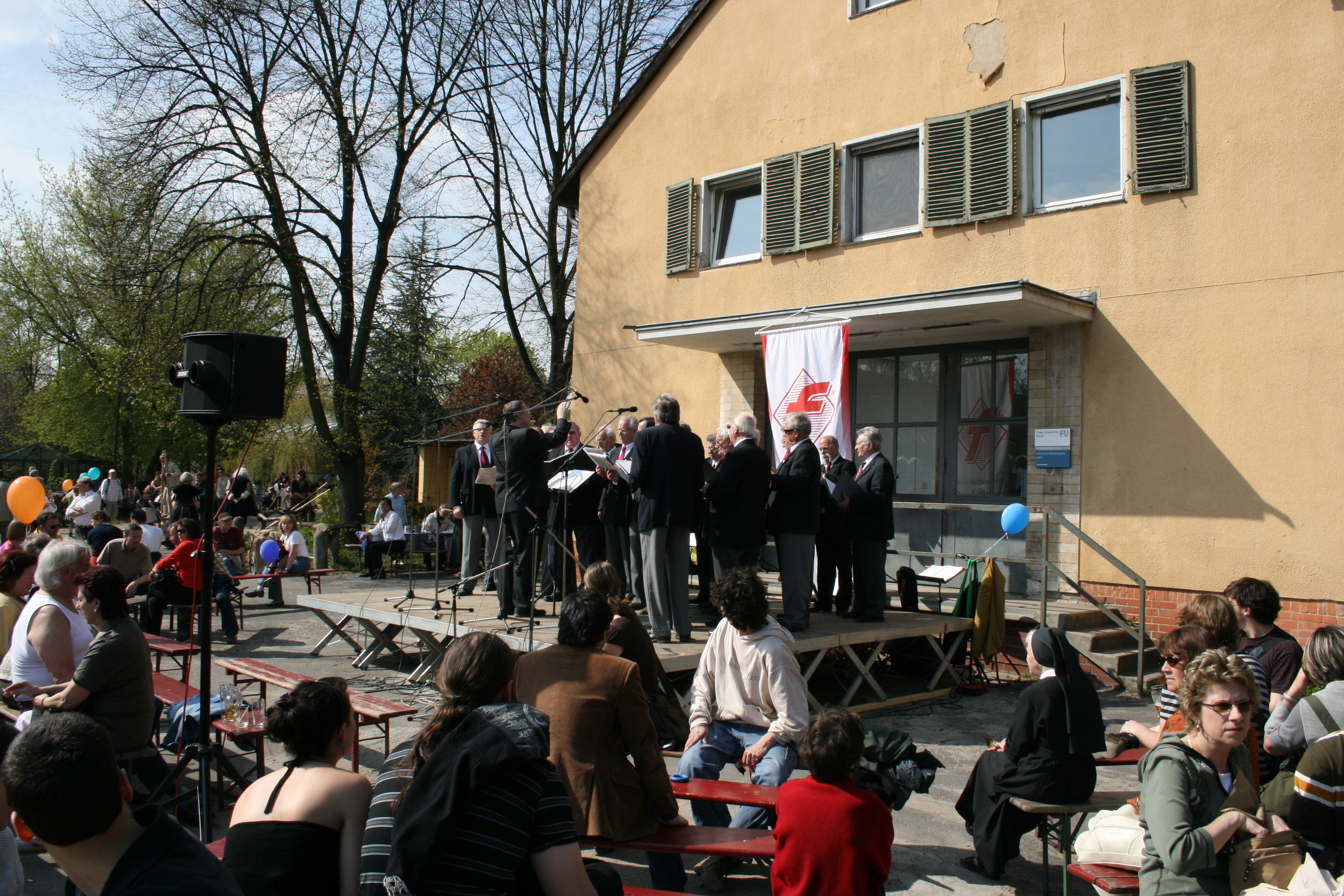
Performance at the Berlin Bratwurst Championship (Bratwurstmeisterschaft)

After World War II, some of the manor lands were used in the construction of the Free University. A citizens' initiative known as "Friends of the Dahlem Manor," first chaired by Martin Quilisch, was founded to support the conversion of the remaining land into an outdoor museum.

The museum first established itself by participating in citywide events such as harvest festivals and Christmas markets. In 1995, the operation of the museum was transferred to the Stiftung Stadtmuseum Berlin. Today the museum is operated by the Stiftung Domäne Dahlem as an independent foundation. The museum puts on exhibits related to agriculture and food culture. The manor house contains a shop and meat market from the 1920s.

In 2015, the museum extended into another historical building and opened an exhibit named "From Farm to Plate." The exhibit depicts the development of food culture from 1850 to the present. The three-story building contains hundreds of multi-media and hands-on exhibits. The attic of the building has special kid-friendly exhibits.

The manor is a certified Bioland operation and is the only farm in Germany with a direct U-Bahn connection.

== Awards and recognition ==
- Recognized by the United Nations Decade of Education for Sustainable Development initiative for the periods 2008–2009, 2010–2011, and 2012–2013
- 2011 prize-winner of the nationwide competition Ideen für die Bildungsrepublik as part of the initiative Deutschland – Land der Ideen, for the implementation of kid-friendly learning opportunities

== See also ==
- List of museums and galleries in Berlin
- List of open-air and living museums
