= Dahlem-Dorf station =

Station of the Berlin U-Bahn

Coordinates: 52°27′27″N 13°17′23″E

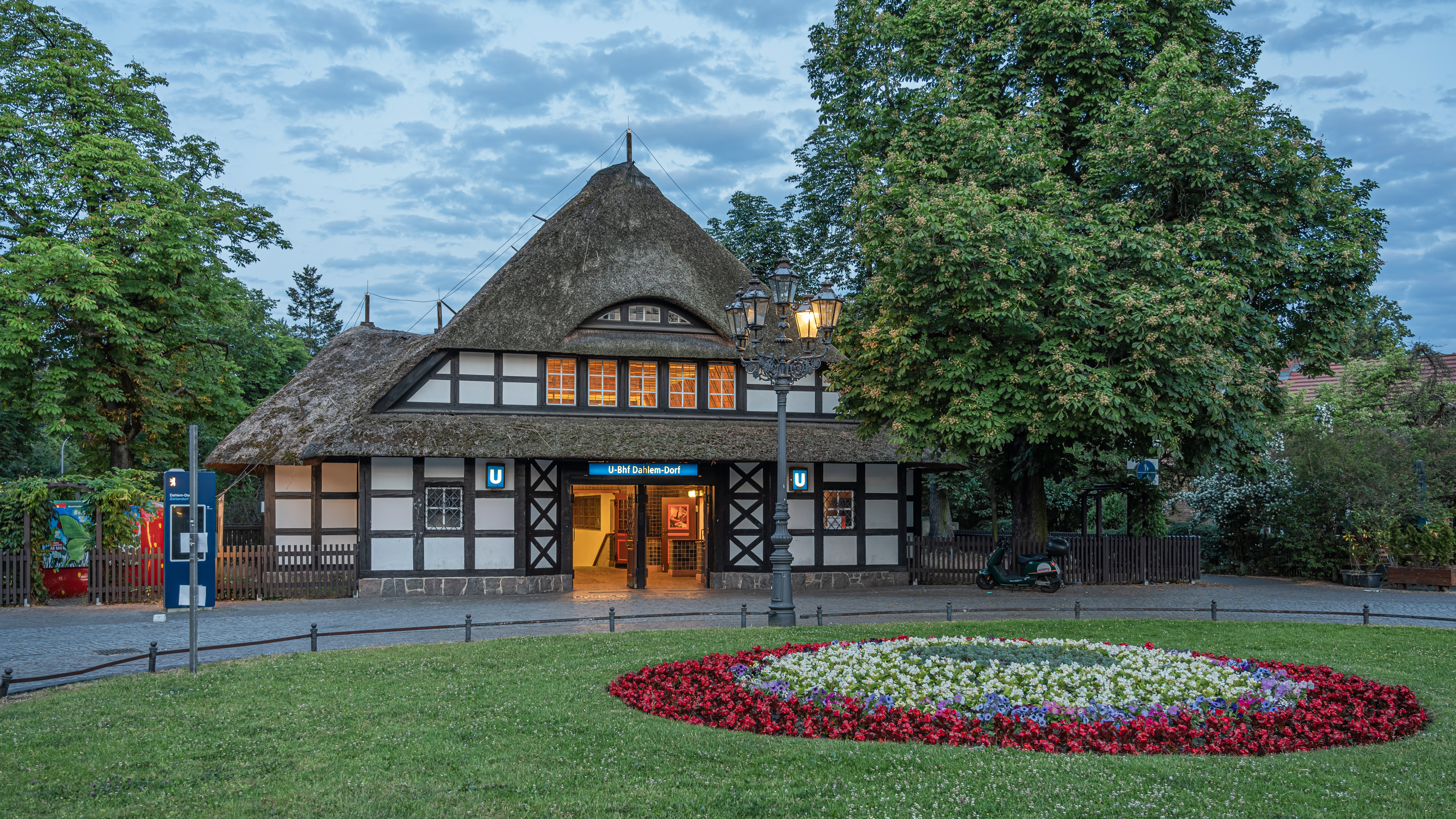
U-Bahn station Dahlem-Dorf

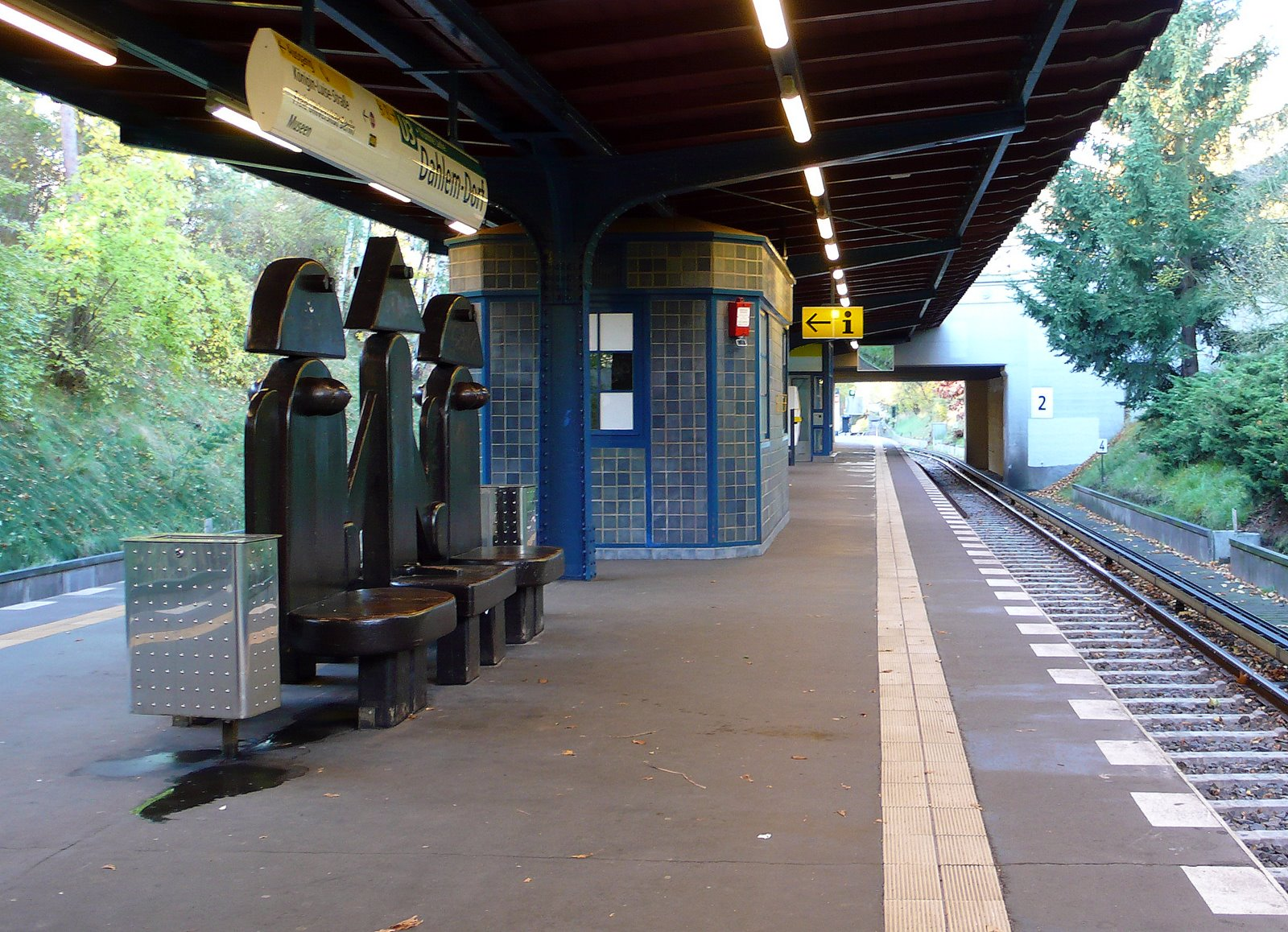
Platform of the station

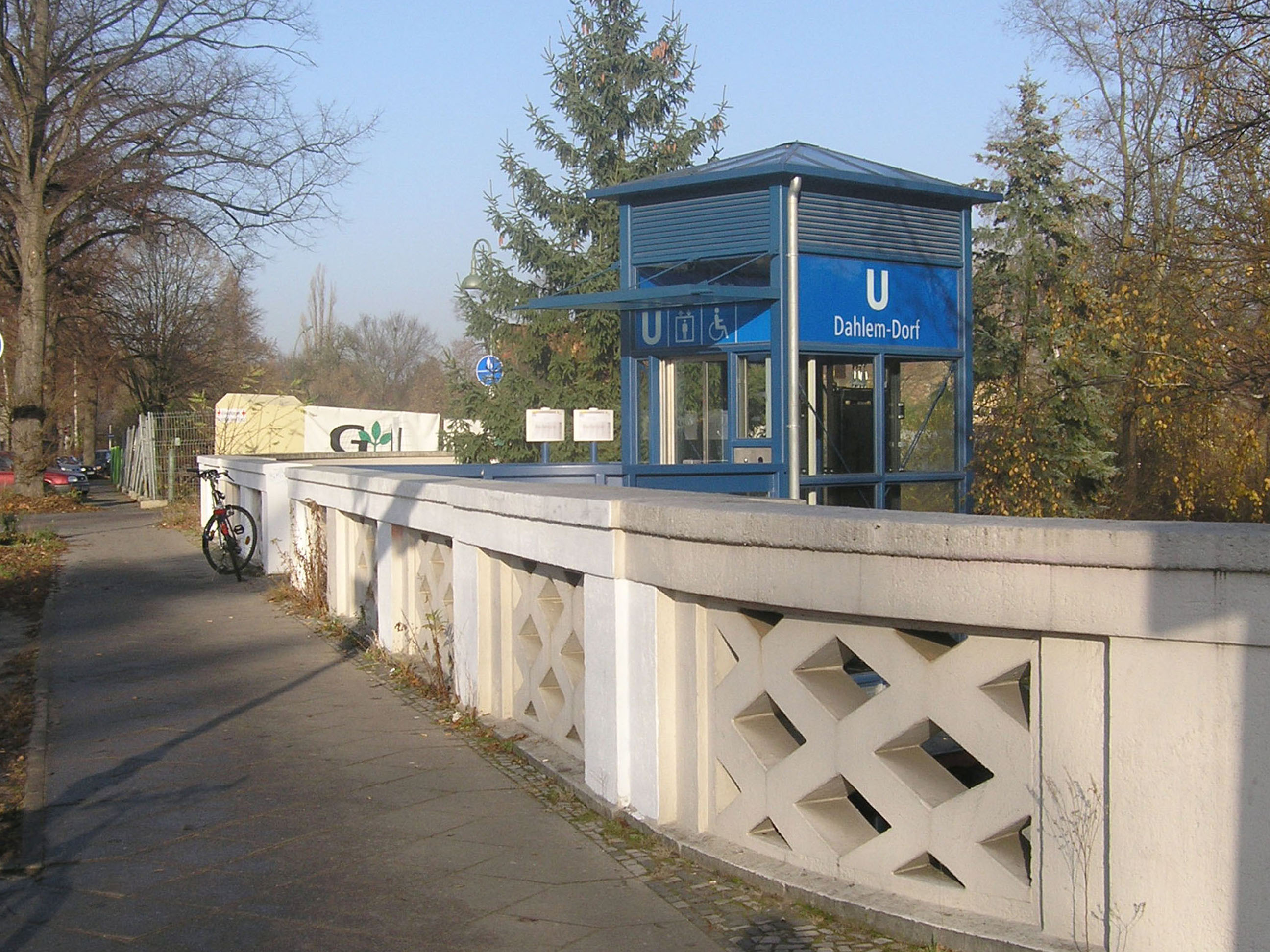
Exit with lift to Fabeckstrasse

Dahlem-Dorf is a Berlin U-Bahn station located on the U3. It serves the neighborhood of Dahlem and is one of two main stations used by students of the Freie Universität Berlin (FU Berlin), the other being Freie Universität (Thielplatz).

== History ==
It was built in 1913 by the architects F.and W. Hennings. The architecture of the station building with its distinctive thatched roof is based on the looks of traditional northern-German farmhouses.

On 29 December 1943, Dahlem-Dorf was destroyed due to air raids. In 1945 it was closed for a few months due to the war. In 1980, the thatched roof of the building burned down due to arson. It was rebuilt in 1981.

Two wooden seating groups designed as a group of figures by Berlin artist Wolf van Roy have been referring to the nearby ethnological museum since 1984.

Dahlem-Dorf station was named Europe's most beautiful in 1987 in Japan.

In April 2012, the station burned down again and was restored in mid-2013, but instead of the original grass-like material a synthetic replica was used for "reasons of security".

== Notes ==
Preceding station	Berlin U-Bahn	Following station
Freie Universität (Thielplatz) towards Krumme Lanke	U3	Podbielskiallee towards Warschauer Straße
