= U3 (Berlin U-Bahn) =

Rapid transit line

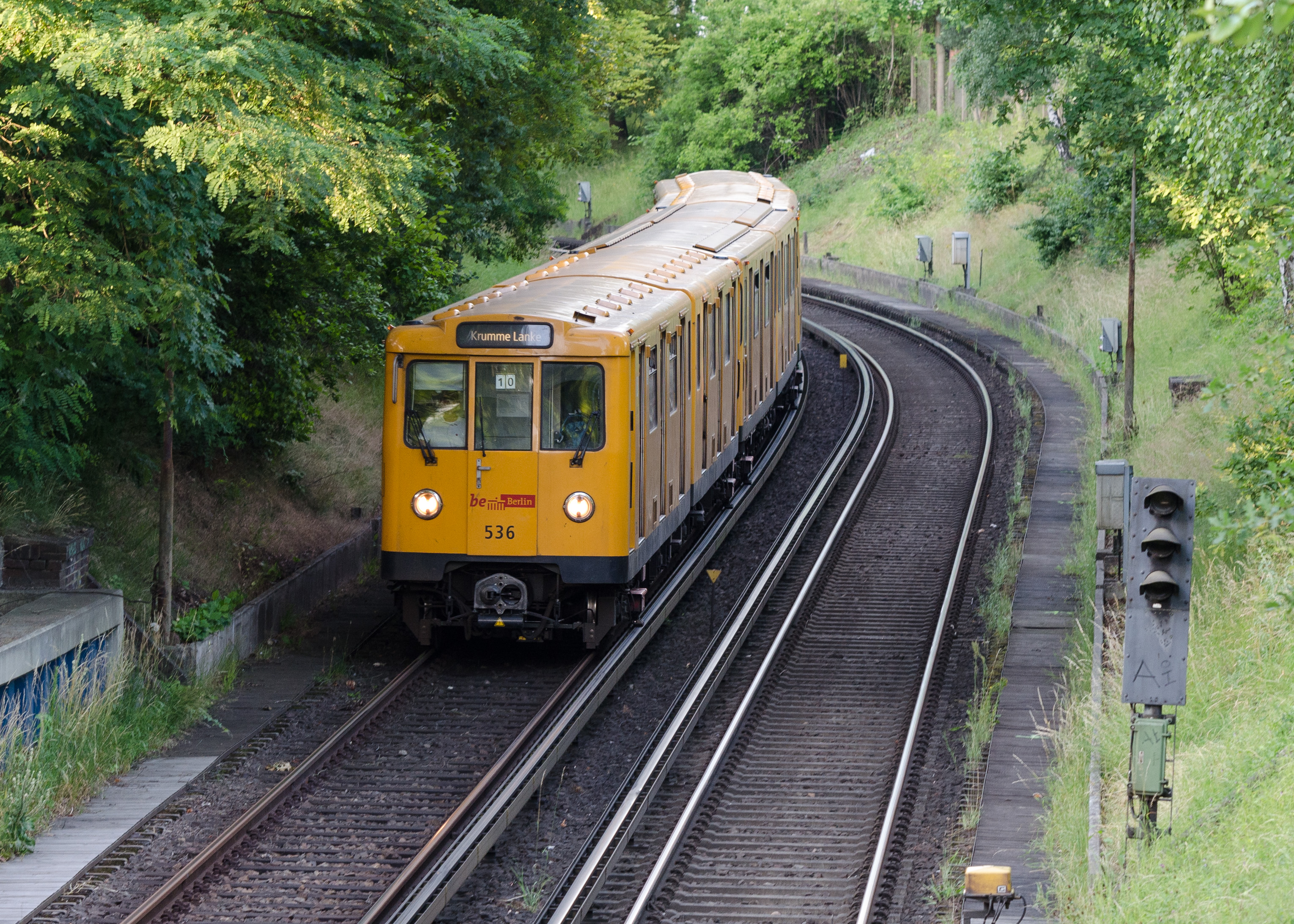
- A southbound U3 train approaching Freie Universität (Thielplatz)

Overview
- Locale: Berlin
- Termini: Warschauer Straße; Krumme Lanke
- Stations: 24

Service
- Type: Rapid transit
- System: Berlin U-Bahn
- Operator: Berliner Verkehrsbetriebe
- Depots: Grunewald; Warschauer Straße

History
- Opened: 12 October 1913; 112 years ago (Note: From Wittenbergplatz to Thielplatz (Freie Universität))
- Last extension: 22 December 1929 (Note: From Thielplatz (Freie Universität) to Krumme Lanke)
- Separated from U1: 12 December 2004

Technical
- Line length: 18.9 km (11.7 mi)
- Track gauge: 1,435 mm (4 ft 8 1/2 in) standard gauge
- Loading gauge: Kleinprofil
- Electrification: 750 V DC third rail (top running)
Route map
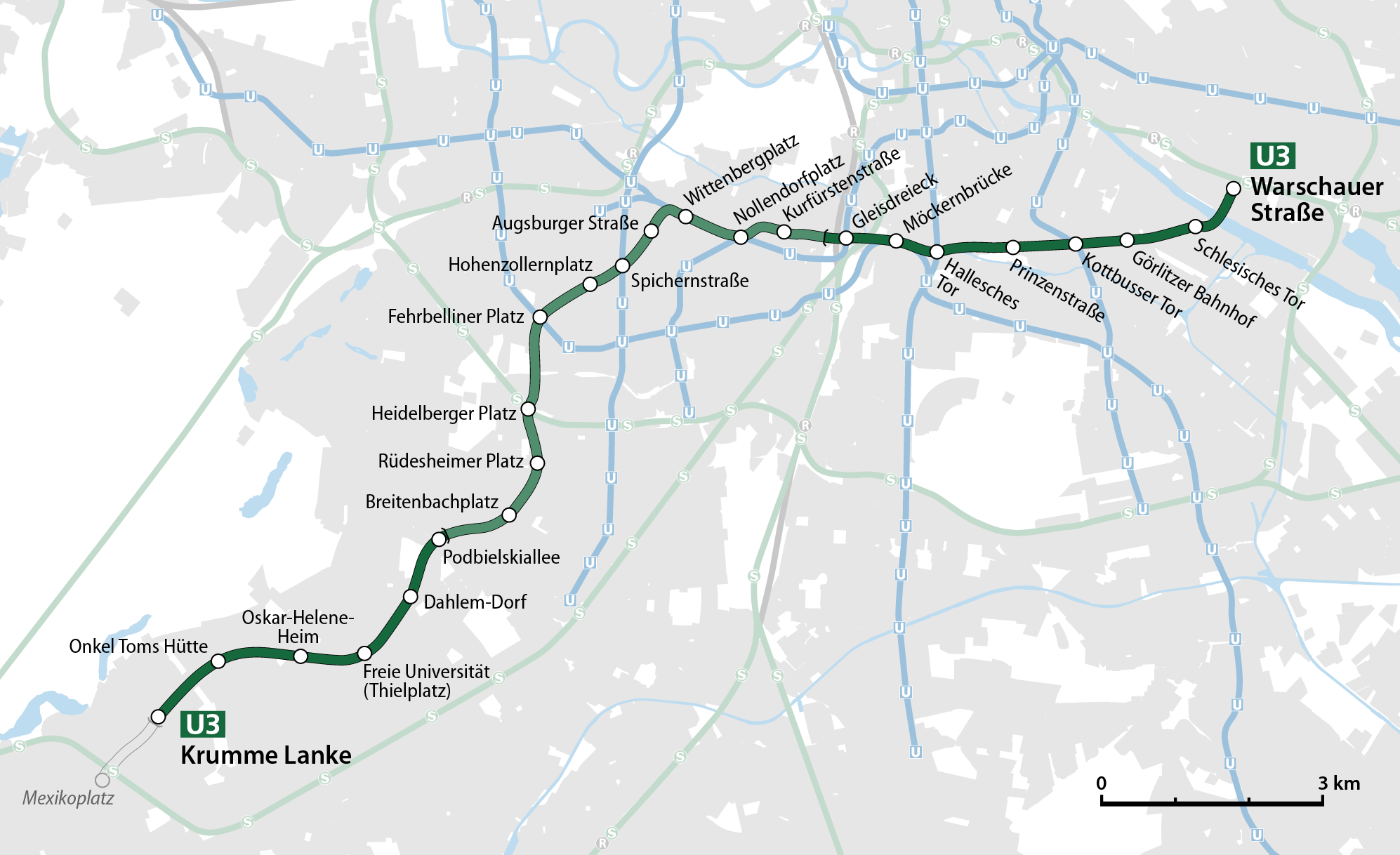
- (*) Step-free eastbound only

U3 is a line on the Berlin U-Bahn created in its current version on 7 May 2018.

The routing is largely the same as the previous U2 until 1993, but it runs from Krumme Lanke to Wittenbergplatz. The route was renumbered to U1 from 1993 to 2004. It was extended one station further east to Nollendorfplatz to enable trains to be reversed and to allow one-stop transfer to the U4 in 2003. On 7 May 2018, the U3 was extended to run with the U1 all the way to Warschauer Straße.

== Changing routes and designations ==
The line to Krumme Lanke station has changed several times in the course of its existence. Initially, line A connected Krumme Lanke in the southwest of Berlin with Pankow in the north and was marked in red on the network maps. From 1957 two lines served the southwestern section of the line: the red route A^{II} to Pankow as before, and a green route B^{II} to Warschauer Brücke. After the construction of the Berlin Wall in 1961, the small profile network was completely redesigned in 1966. The route to Dahlem received the line designation 2, running initially to Gleisdreieck via Bülowstraße, and from 1972 only to Wittenbergplatz. Line 3—with a dark green colour code—was assigned to the Uhlandstraße–Wittenbergplatz stub track. This changed again in 1993 as the line was marked green again and received the line number U1, which ran to Warschauer Straße. The designation U3 for the route to Uhlandstraße, however, disappeared, as this was now served by line U15, also running to Warschauer Straße. Finally, the line was redesignated from the network timetable change in December 2004 to the turquoise U3. Since 2005, the line has also operated as a late night service. From 4 to 7 March 2013, the trains were designated again as U1 between Krumme Lanke and Warschauer Straße due to construction work on the section between Uhlandstraße and Kurfürstendamm. Unlike in analogous cases (U12), no corresponding line designation (U13) was introduced here. From 2004 to 2018, line U3 was limited to the Krumme Lanke–Nollendorfplatz section.

== Current route ==
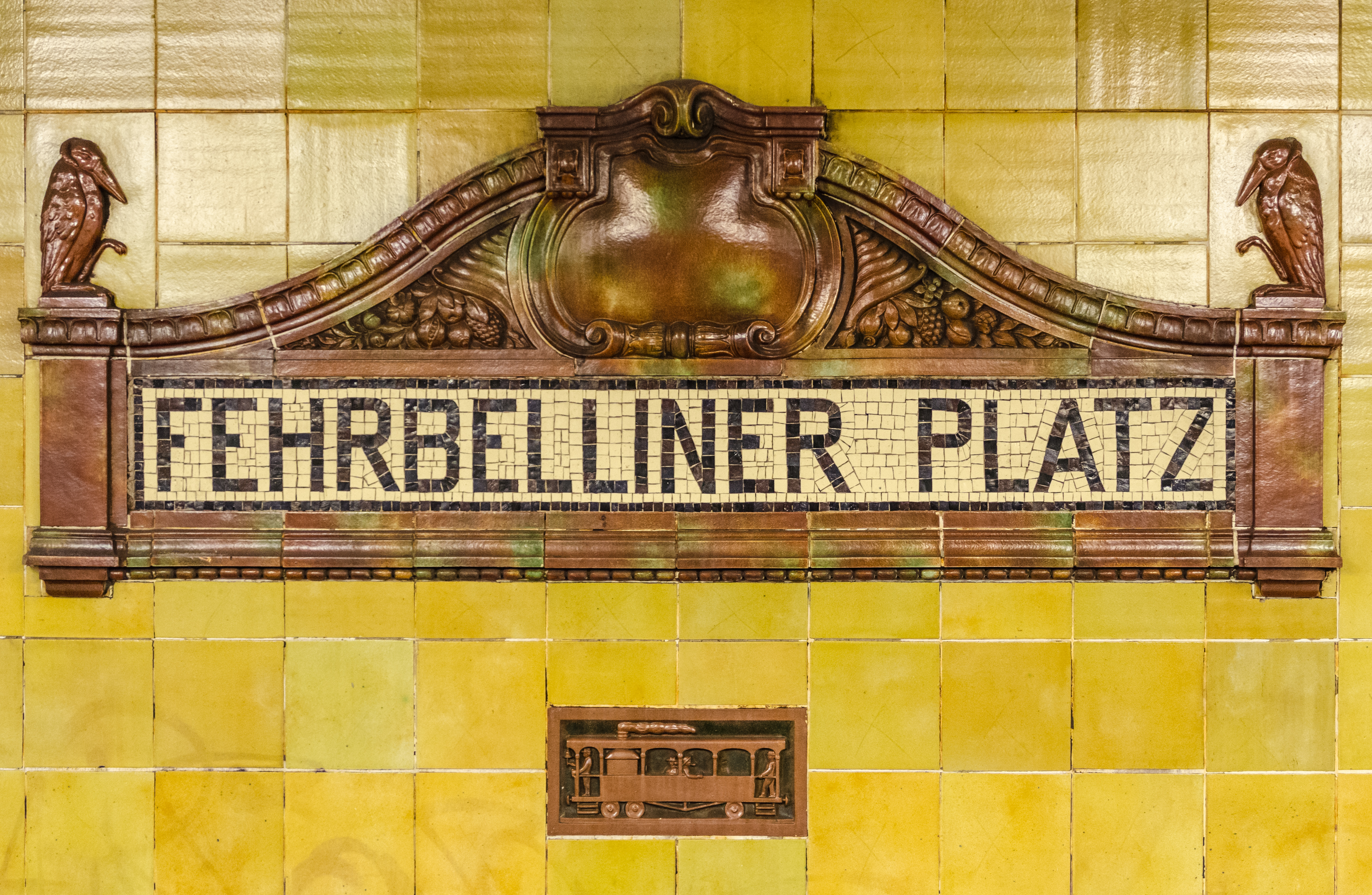
Historical station sign

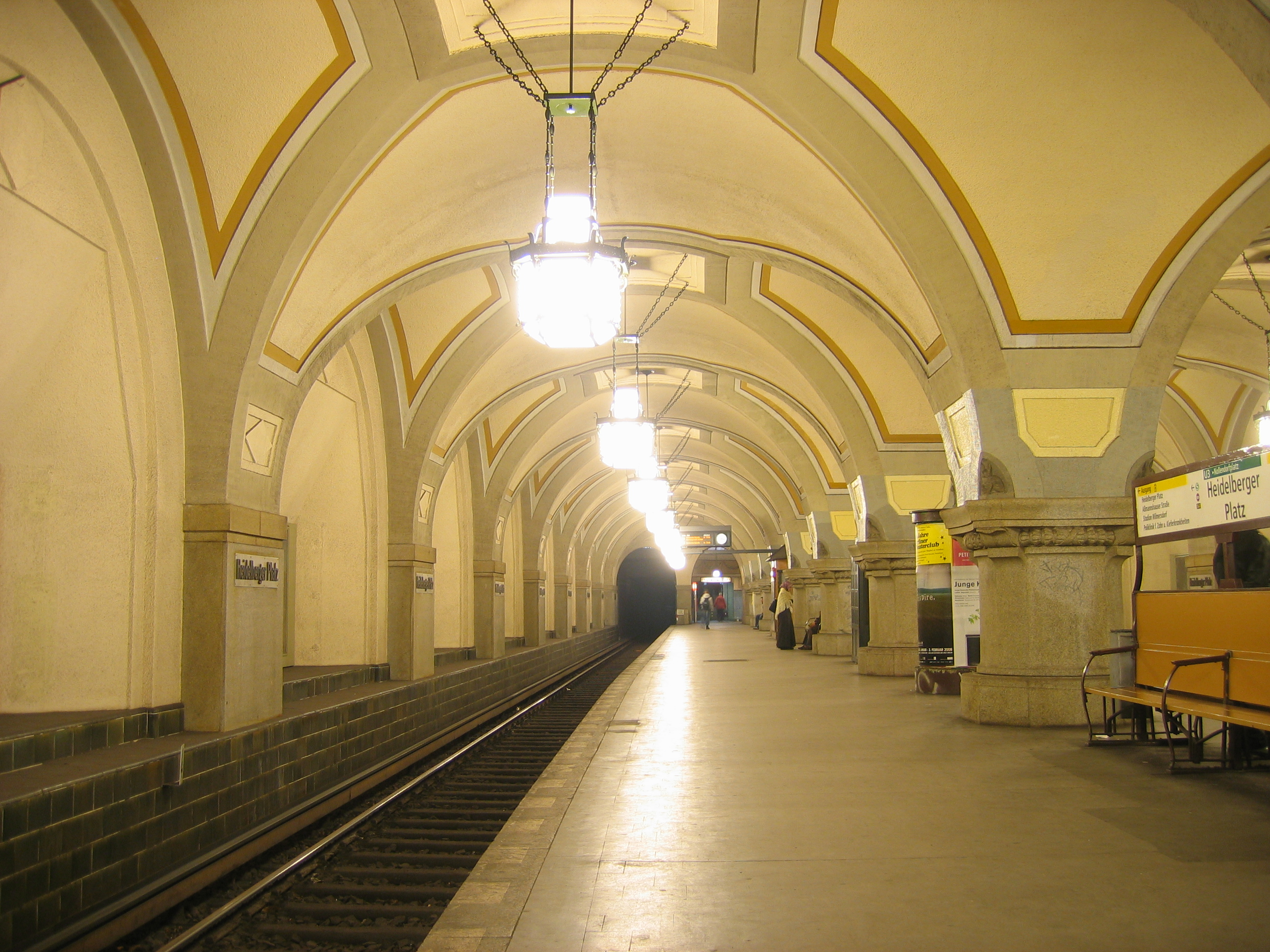
Cathedral-like Heidelberger Platz station

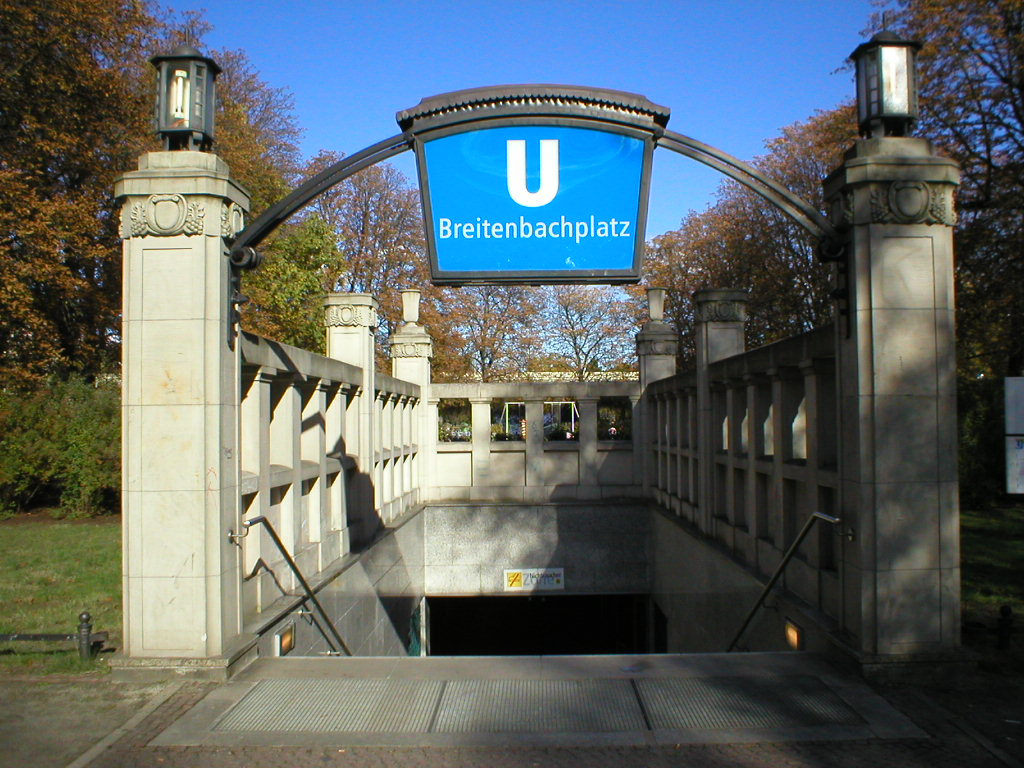
Entrance to the Breitenbachplatz station

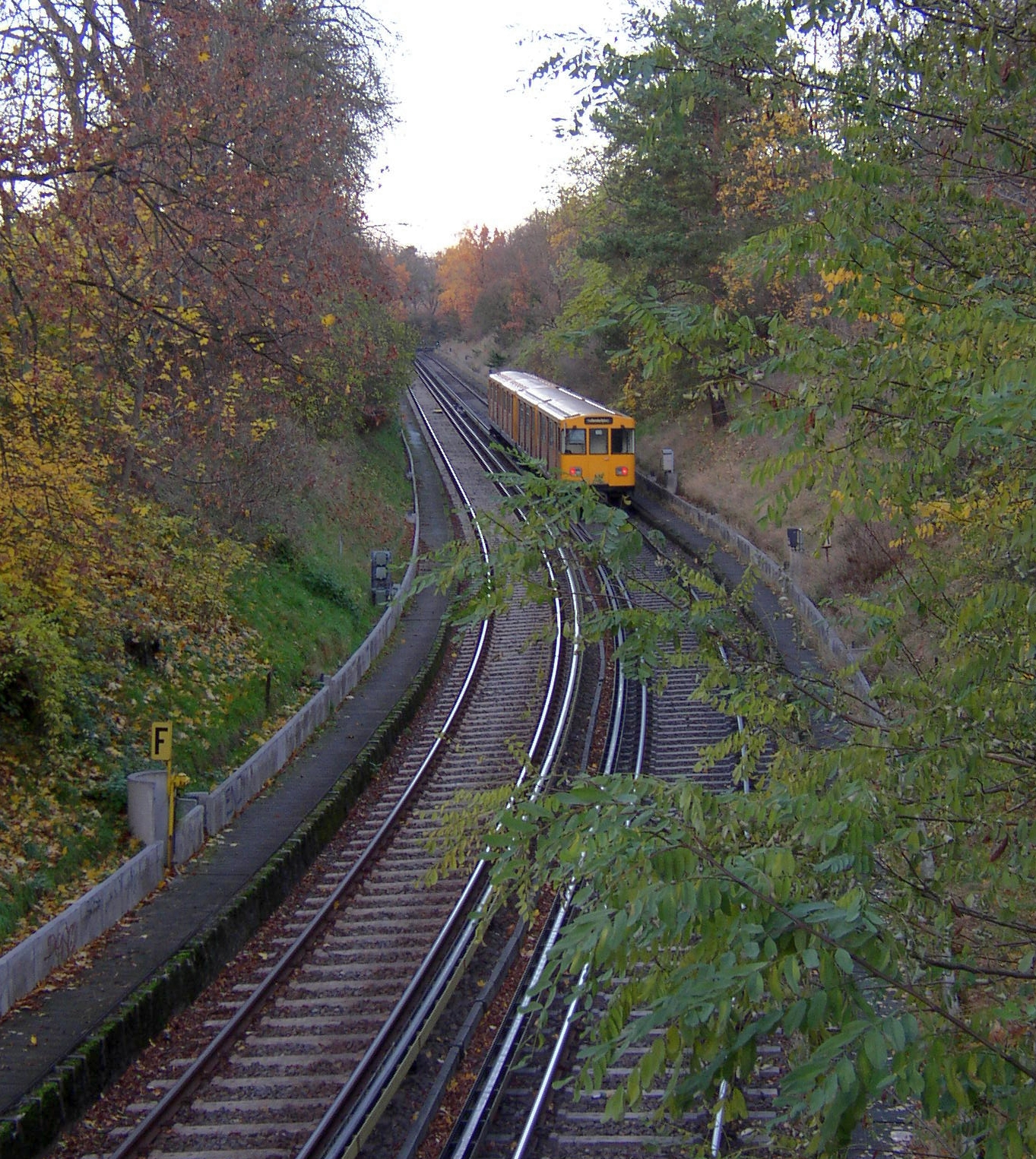
The southern section of the line lies in a cutting

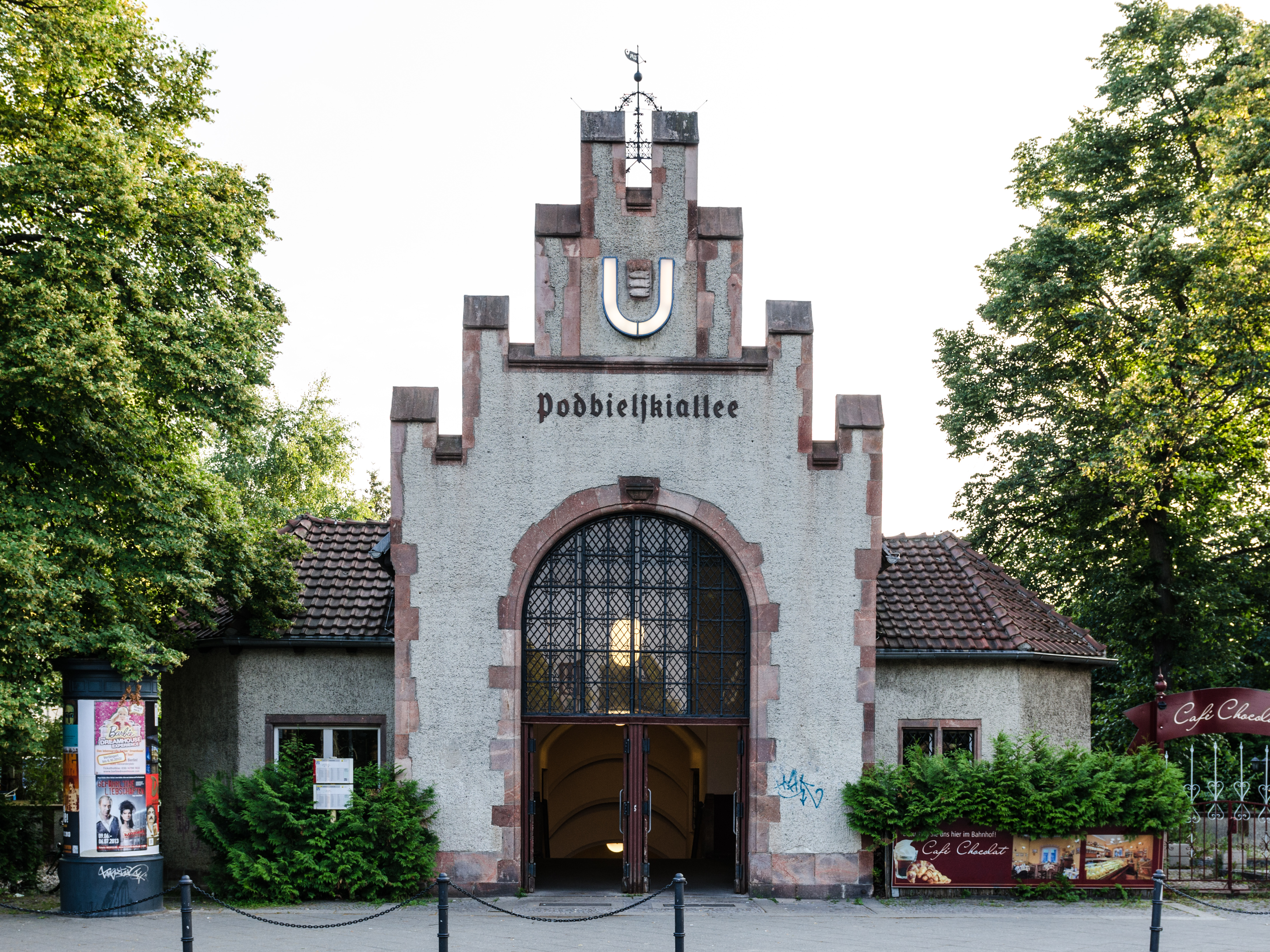
Entrance building of Podbielskiallee station

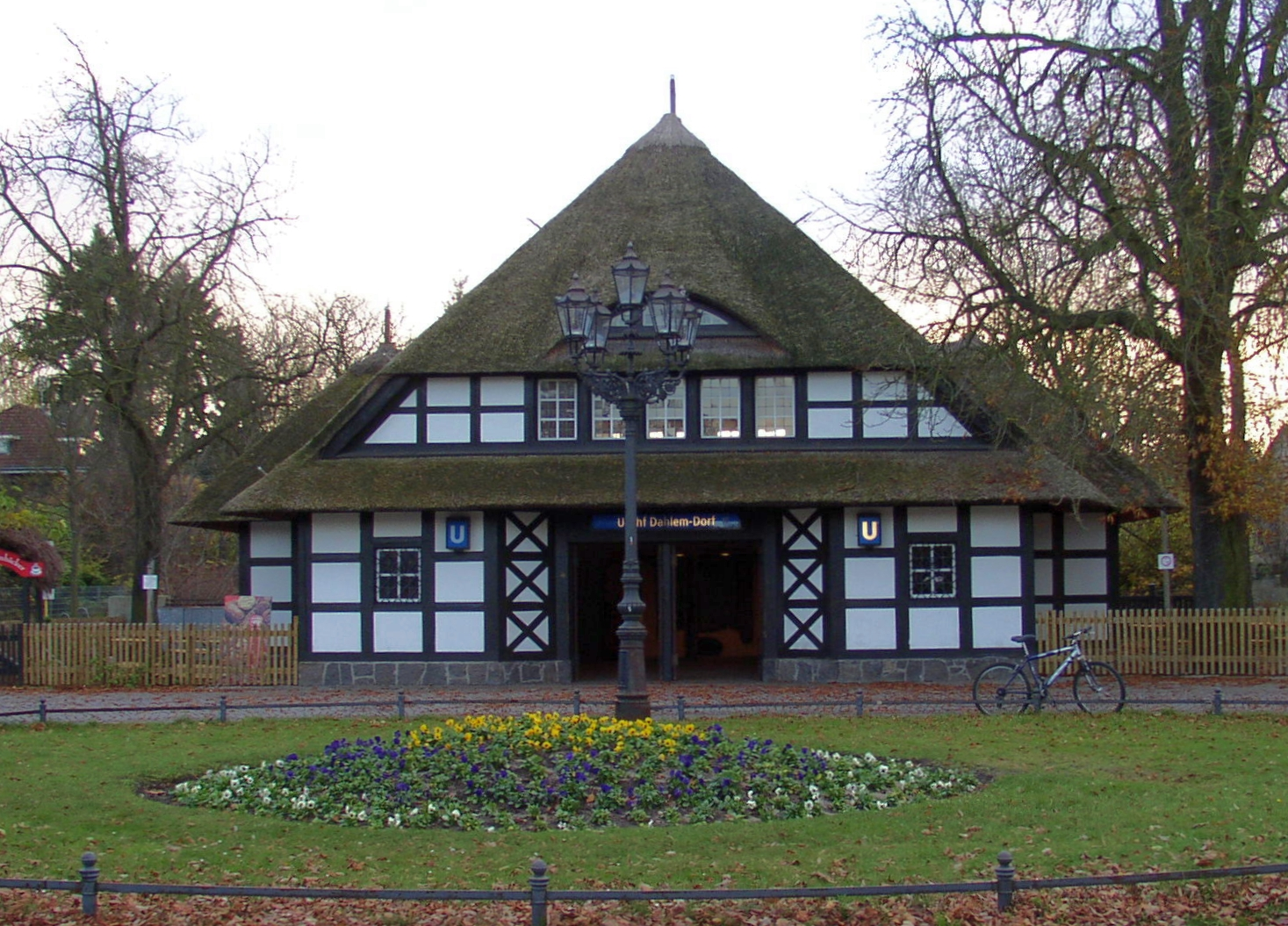
Entrance building of Dahlem-Dorf station

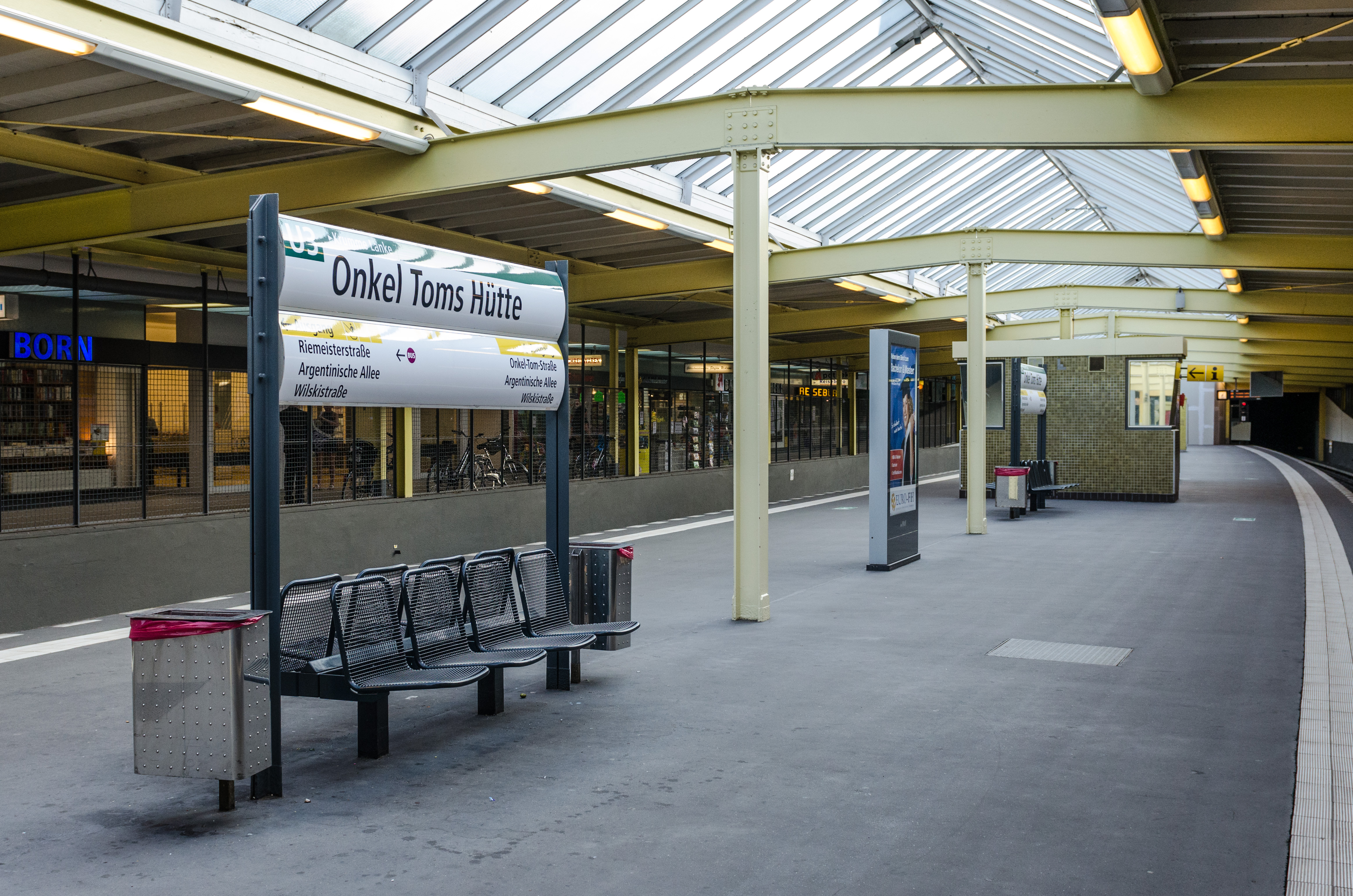
Platform of Onkel Toms Hütte station with shopping arcades on the right and left

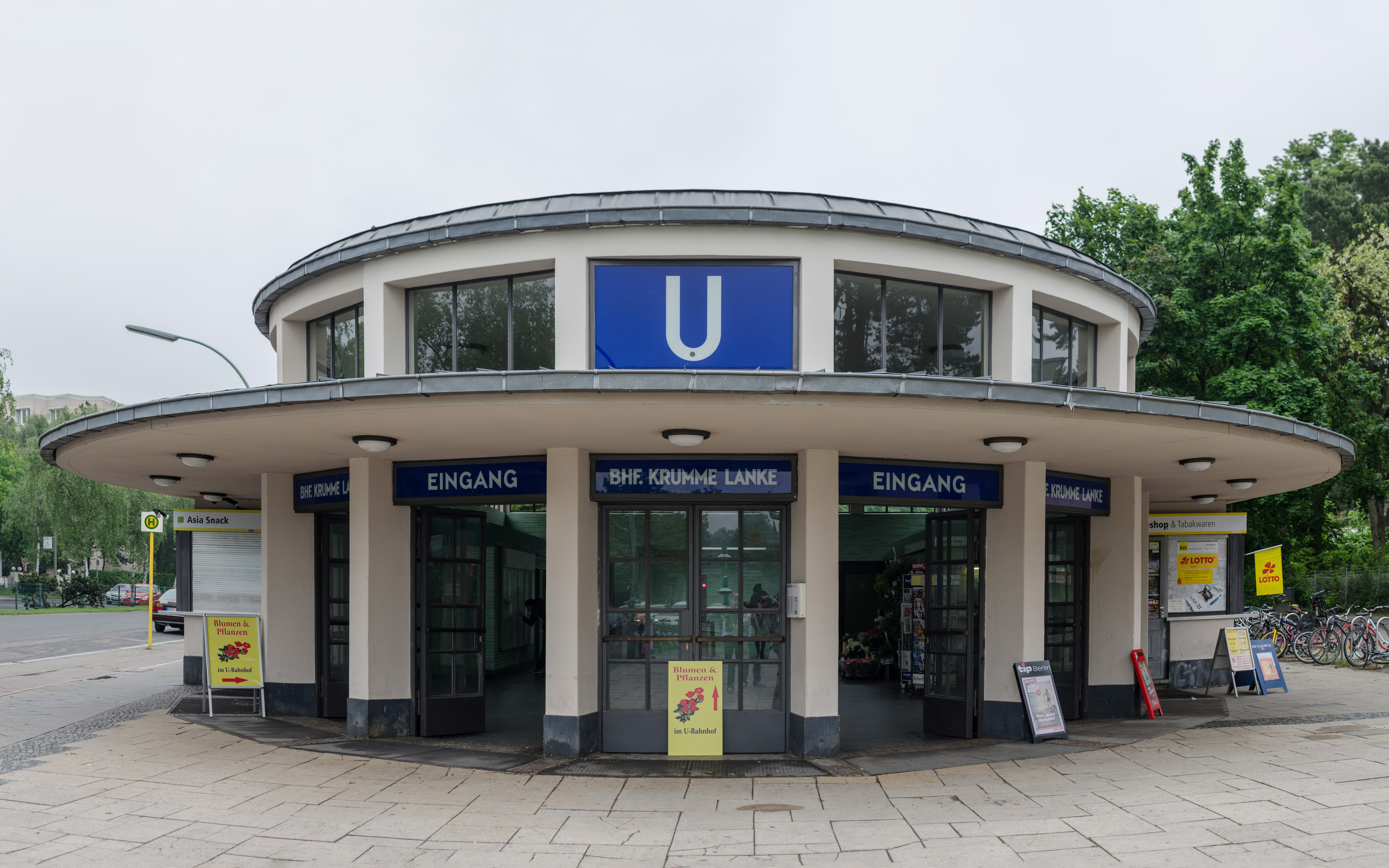
The very functional entrance building of Krumme Lanke station

The U3 currently starts at Warschauer Straße. From there it runs together with the U1 on its line to Wittenbergplatz. Under Tauentzienstraße it turns in a tight right-angle curve to the southwest and follows the streets of Nürnberger Straße and Spichernstraße to Spichernstraße station (interchange station to the U9) at the intersection with Bundesallee. It then follows Hohenzollerndamm to Fehrbelliner Platz, which provides interchange with the U7, and continues south under Barstrasse. Below street level, the U3 crosses the Fennsee (lake) in Volkspark Wilmersdorf (park) on a two-level bridge. Beyond the A 100 and after passing under the Ringbahn at Heidelberger Platz it follows the streets of Aßmannshauser Straße, Rüdesheimer Straße and Schorlemerallee and leaves the tunnel immediately before Podbielskiallee station. From there, the U3 continues in a cutting next to Archivstrasse and later Brümmerstrasse. Passing behind Freie Universität (Thielplatz), it turns due west. The last section runs south of the streets of Saargemünder Straße and Argentinische Allee. The U3 terminates at Krumme Lanke station, named after a nearby lake, at the intersection of Fischerhüttenstraße and Argentinische Allee.

== History ==
In the summer of 1907, the Hochbahngesellschaft ("Elevated Railway Company") of the new town of Wilmersdorf proposed the construction of an underground railway through the area. A route was envisaged running to Nürnberger Platz and, if Wilmersdorf would pay for it, on to Rastatter Platz, now Breitenbachplatz. Since Wilmersdorf had poor transport links, this suggestion was readily accepted. The commission for the development of the lands of Dahlem Manor, which were further south and were still largely undeveloped, was very interested in a rail connection. It wanted the proposed line to continue from Breitenbachplatz to Thielplatz.

Now, however, a big problem arose. The proposed line would run partly through Charlottenburg, but the municipality of Charlottenburg saw Wilmersdorf as a major competitor when it came to attracting wealthy taxpayers. Long negotiations were conducted until the following agreement was finalised in the summer of 1910: in addition to the line already planned, another one would be built in Charlottenburg under Kurfürstendamm, with the provisional terminus at Uhlandstraße.

According to one source, the then Prussian Minister of Public Works, Paul von Breitenbach, is said to have directed the city of Charlottenburg to allow the construction of the Wilmersdorf U-Bahn. As a result Rastatter Platz station and the square it was named after before the opening of the U-Bahn was renamed Breitenbachplatz by the grateful city of Wilmersdorf.

Construction work began in the summer of 1910. The following stations had to be built or converted:

- Wittenbergplatz (conversion)
- Nürnberger Platz (now closed)
- Hohenzollernplatz
- Fehrbelliner Platz
- Heidelberger Platz
- Rüdesheimer Platz
- Breitenbachplatz (originally planned as Rastatter Platz)
- Podbielskiallee
- Dahlem-Dorf
- Thielplatz (temporary terminus, then having a small waiting room)

as well as on the Charlottenburg line:

- Uhlandstraße

The previously double-track Wittenbergplatz station, which was only equipped with two side platforms, had to be completely rebuilt. A junction station was built with five platform faces, a sixth was prepared and a vestibule was built. The cities of Wilmersdorf and Charlottenburg presented various proposals; Finally, however, the chief of police recommended building it according to the plans of Alfred Grenander, the in-house architect of the Elevated Railway Company.

The stations in the Wilmersdorf area were elaborately designed, because the city was prosperous and wanted to show it. Today this can still be seen at the Hohenzollernplatz, Fehrbelliner Platz, Heidelberger Platz, Rüdesheimer Platz and Breitenbachplatz stations.

Heidelberger Platz represented an additional special feature, because the line of the Ringbahn is very low at this point in a cutting, so the U-Bahn had to be tunnelled even deeper. Therefore, beyond the underpass of the Ringbahn, there was the possibility to use the large space between the top of the carriages and ground level and design the station even more magnificently than the others on this line, that is like a cathedral with a hall vault and hanging illuminated candelabras (it is sometimes compared with the magnificent underground stations of the Moscow Metro from the 1930s). In addition, outside the station, the tunnels in both directions were built with a tunnel-like profile as far as the depth below the surface permitted (the purpose of this subway tunnel construction, which was rare in Berlin at the time, was to save large amounts of steel girders, which were required everywhere with cut and cover construction).

Beyond Breitenbachplatz, the line reached the Dahlem Manor lands. Due to the sparse development, the route could be built in an open cutting. Since the platforms could not be further decorated, the architects focused primarily on the individual design of the entrance buildings.

The additional route to Uhlandstraße, which Charlottenburg had won in the "negotiation poker", only received one more station. The route branches off at Wittenbergplatz, runs parallel to the tracks of today's U1 as far as Breitscheidplatz and continues under Kurfürstendamm to Uhlandstraße station. An extension to Halensee was planned. At the intersection with the newly built large profile route G (now: line U9), another station was added in 1961 with the Kurfürstendamm station, which received side platforms.

The lines to Thielplatz and to Uhlandstrasse both opened on 12 October 1913. Together they were about 10 kilometres (6.2 mi) long. This was the last U-Bahn construction in Berlin before the First World War, which began on 1 August 1914. No more U-Bahn lines were completed until ten years later.

=== A gift U-Bahn line ===
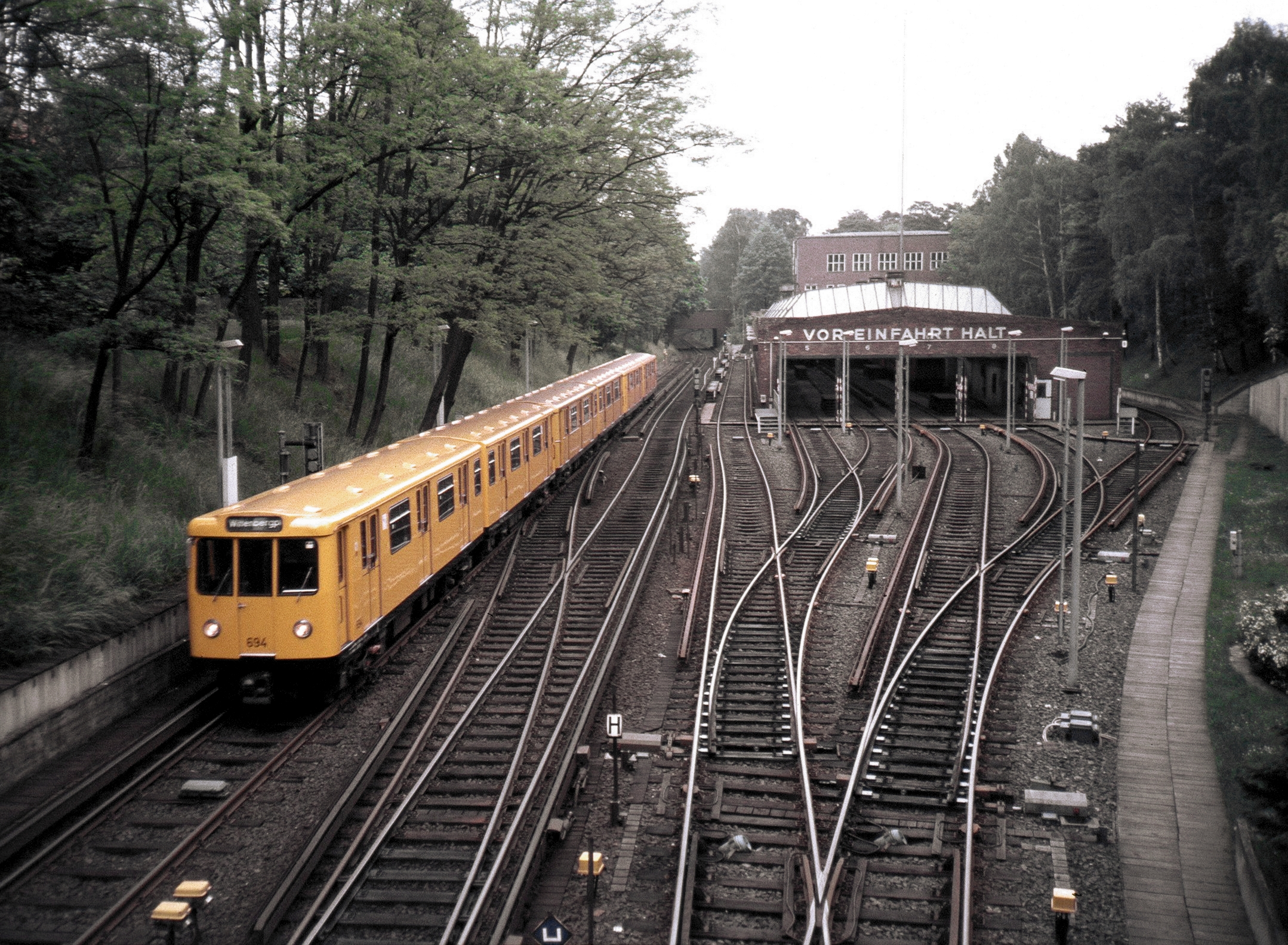
Train already signposted for its return journey (consisting of A3L, A3L still with decorative strips, A3) passes the Krumme Lanke depot, 1987

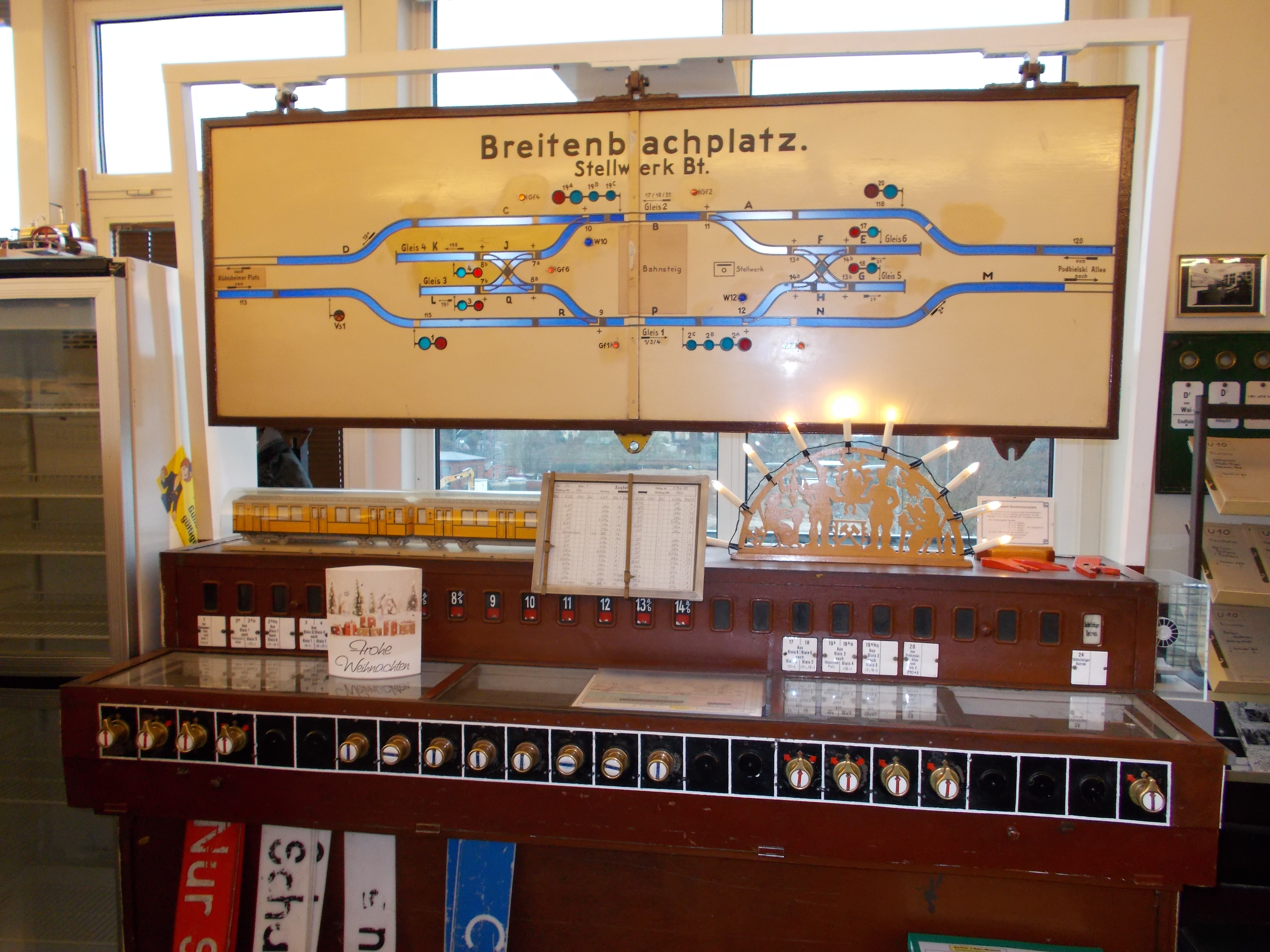
Old control panel of the signal box at Breitenbachplatz station in the Berlin U-Bahn Museum

The southern end of the Wilmersdorf-Dahlemer U-Bahn did not hold good prospects for an extension. The Dahlem line had been unprofitable since it opened and only a single car was operated from Breitenbachplatz to Thielplatz as a so-called "solo car".

Greater Berlin, which was united in 1920, demanded that the Prussian government or the Dahlem Commission (Dahlemkommission) take over the line (including the operating cost grants) and took legal action in the Reichsgericht (supreme court) to this end. However, in the years that followed, the financial situation of the line improved considerably with increasing development. The Prussian government was finally able to hand over the line to the city free of charge and debt-free on 1 January 1928.

At the same time, the Sommerfeld group, which owned large areas in the southwest of Berlin that were still undeveloped, offered free land and the assumption of construction costs for an extension of the line to Krumme Lanke. In fact, the city was gifted 3 kilometres (1.9 mi) of U-Bahn.

The line would have the following stations, which are all located in a cutting:

- Oskar-Helene-Heim
- Onkel Toms Hütte
- Krumme Lanke (terminus with a four-track workshop and storage hall in front)

This section went into service on 22 December 1929. The Onkel Toms Hütte ("Uncle Tom's Cabin") station and housing estate were named after a nearby restaurant of the same name. The Krumme Lanke station received a New Objectivity style entrance building, which was one of Alfred Grenander's late works. The station forecourt was named after him on 6 June 2009. Since the building had become dilapidated, it had to be demolished in 1988. A good replica was built in 1989. The terminus of today's U3 line is named after a nearby lake.

A workshop consisting of a carriage shed with a workshop building was built at Krumme Lanke station. However, due to a lack of capacity, the workshop was closed in 1968 and necessary repairs were outsourced to the Grunewald workshop. In the years that followed, the carriage shed was primarily used as a storage facility, where minor repairs such as changing lamps were only occasionally carried out. Years of not investing in the maintenance of the carriage shed finally led to its closure due to dilapidation in 2014. The hall is heritage-listed.

=== Modifications ===
During the construction of line G, now U9, an interchange station was to be built at the intersection of the two lines. However, since there was no station at the Spichernstraße/ Bundesallee intersection on the U3—then line 2—the Spichernstraße station was built. The nearby Nürnberger Platz station was closed and completely gutted on 1 July 1959. The area of the former central platform was converted into a double-track siding, which is accessed from Spichernstraße. However, the distance of 1,106 metres (3,629 ft) between the Wittenbergplatz and Spichernstraße stations was considered unacceptable for the City West area, so the new Augsburger Straße station was built. It was considered necessary to minimise the impact on the existing structure at both new small-profile stations, so both were built with side platforms. They were opened on 2 June 1959 (Spichernstraße) and 8 May 1961 (Augsburger Straße). The architecture is strongly based on Grenander's model. The buildings were designed in a functional style based on designs by the then subway architect Bruno Grimmek. Augsburger Straße station was decorated with red-brown tiles and Spichernstraße with light blue tiles.

In 1981, a second entrance building was built at Thielplatz station, which also houses a substation. This shortened the way to the campus of the Free University of Berlin.

=== Extension to Warschauer Straße ===
On 7 May 2018. the U3 was "extended" eastwards on the existing line used by the U1 to the terminus at Warschauer Straße. In other words, the route that existed until 2004 as the then U1 line was restored. This facilitates the movement of students and others from there to the Free University and extended the denser service from Nollendorfplatz eastwards. The extension of the line was facilitated by the new four-car class IK18 sets becoming available in April 2018.

=== Opening dates ===
- 12 October 1913: Wittenbergplatz – Thielplatz
- 24 October 1926: Wittenbergplatz – Nollendorfplatz (underground)
- 22 December 1929: Thielplatz – Krumme Lanke
- 2 June 1959: Spichernstraße station opened; simultaneous closure of Nürnberger Platz station
- 8 May 1961: Augsburger Straße station

== Extension ==
In the south, an extension towards the Berlin Mexikoplatz station is under construction. The new section will run via Argentinische Allee. Even though this would only take 800 metres (2,600 ft) of new tracks, the budgetary constraints of the Berlin Senate significantly delayed the extension plans. As of 2025, the extension is scheduled to be completed by the end of 2030.

== Frequency ==
Train run every 5 minutes on weekdays, every 10 minutes on weekends and since 2006 every 15-minute early mornings on Saturday and Sunday. On the other nights the "N3" bus service operates.

== Former U3 ==

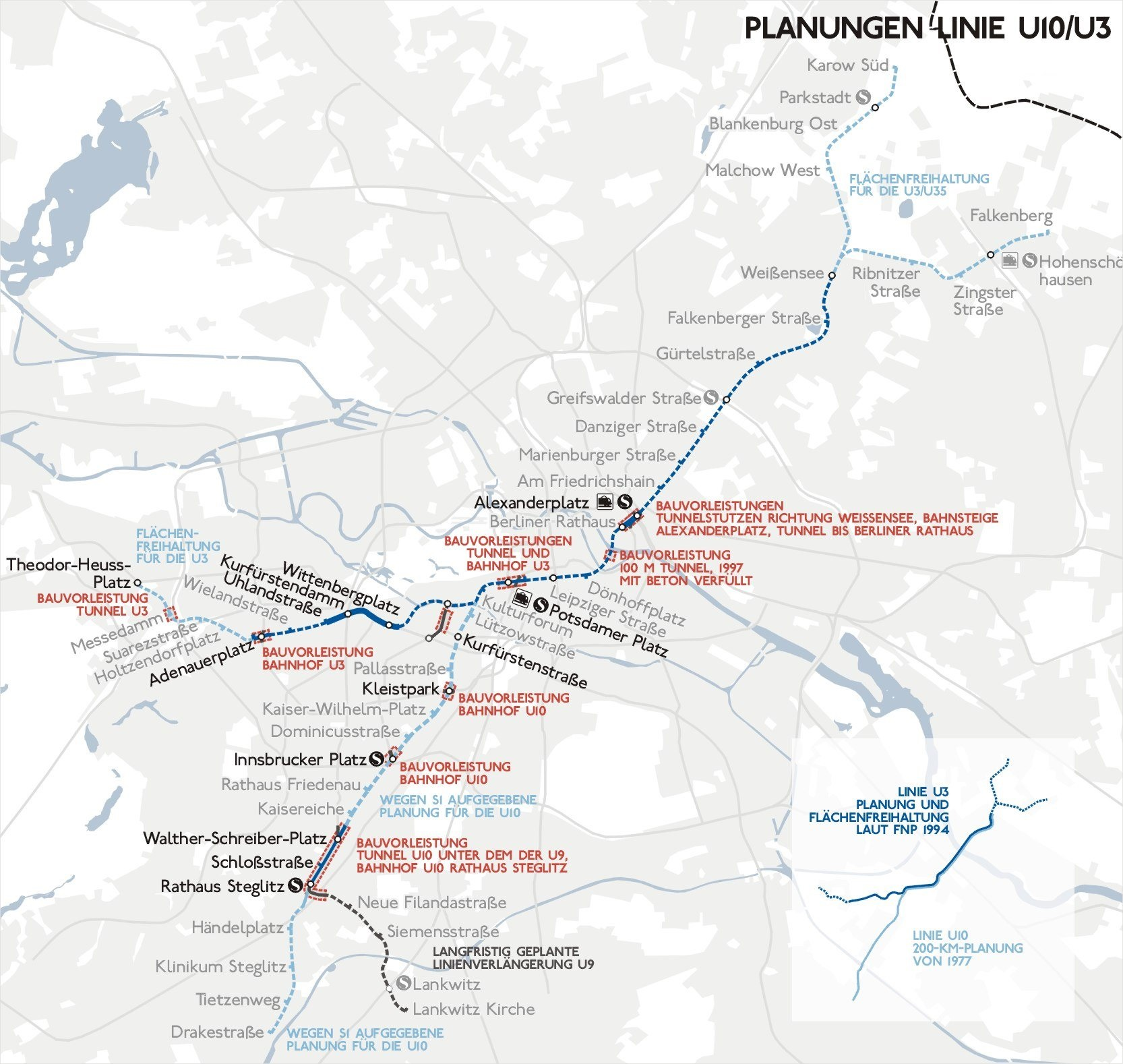

Overview
- Termini: Falkenburg; Karow Süd; Theodor-Heuss-Platz
- Stations: 34

Technical
- Line length: 31.8 km (19.8 mi)
- Track gauge: 1,435 mm (4 ft 8 1/2 in) standard gauge
- Loading gauge: Großprofil

Until 1993 U3 referred to the section of line between Wittenbergplatz and Uhlandstraße, it was formerly numbered B^{II} (until 1957), B^{IV} (from 1957 to 1966) and Line 3 (from 1966 to 1984), before being renamed U3. In 1993, this section was renumbered to U15 and became a branch of the U1.

With the change of line numbers in December 2004, there were some confusion as the planned final phase of the U3 line from Theodor-Heuss-Platz via Westkreuz, Adenauerplatz, Kurfürstendamm, Wittenbergplatz, Lutzowplatz, Potsdamer Platz, and Leipziger Straße to Alexanderplatz, and from there on to Weißensee and Karow-Ost, which would overlap with the present course of the U3 and the unbuilt U10, as well as the provisional future rolling stock which was intended to be driverless Alstom Metropolis trains for the U3. However, these plans were scrapped.
