= Onkel Toms Hütte station =

Station of the Berlin U-Bahn

Coordinates: 52°27′01″N 13°15′12″E

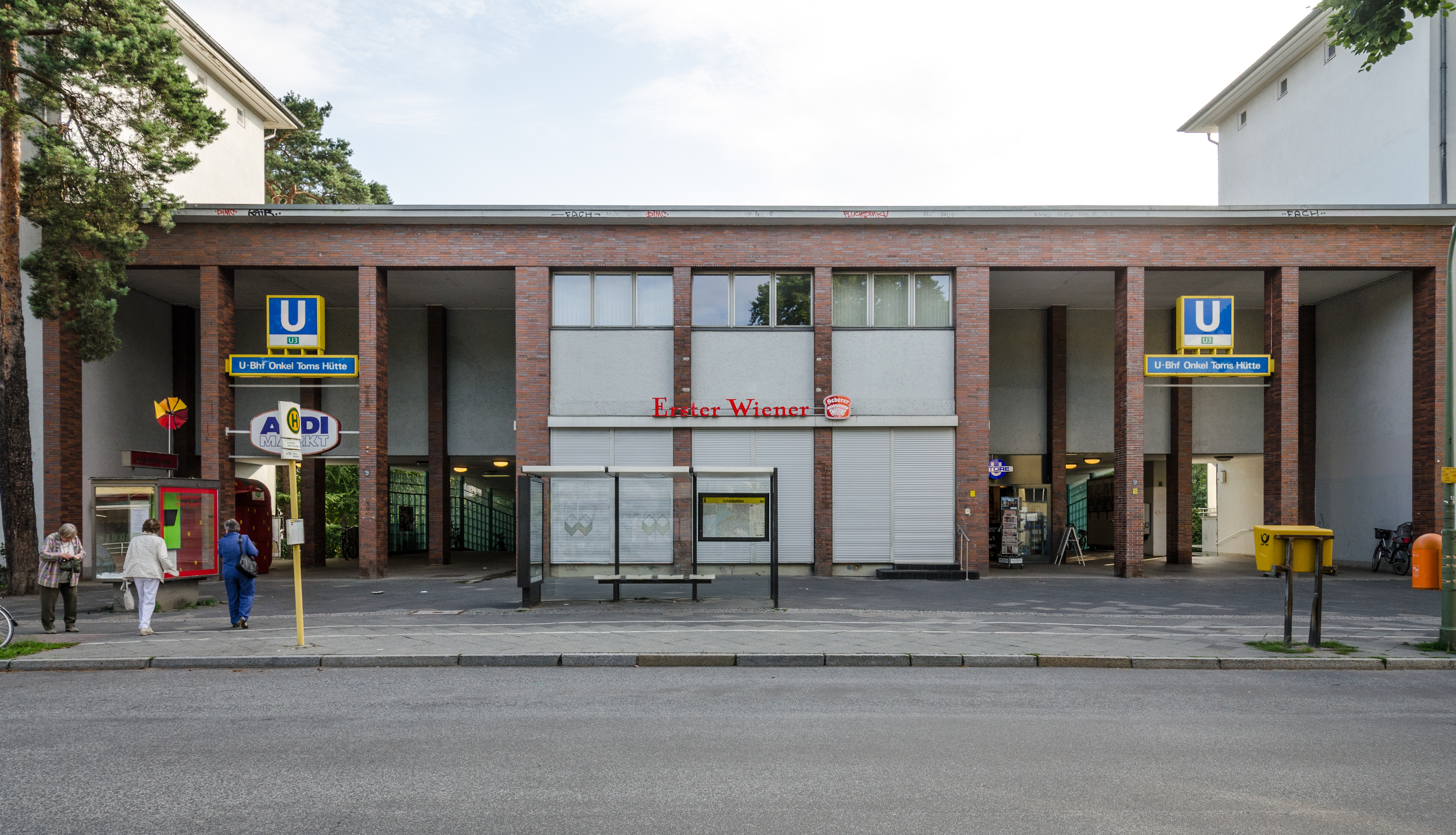
Riemeisterstraße entry

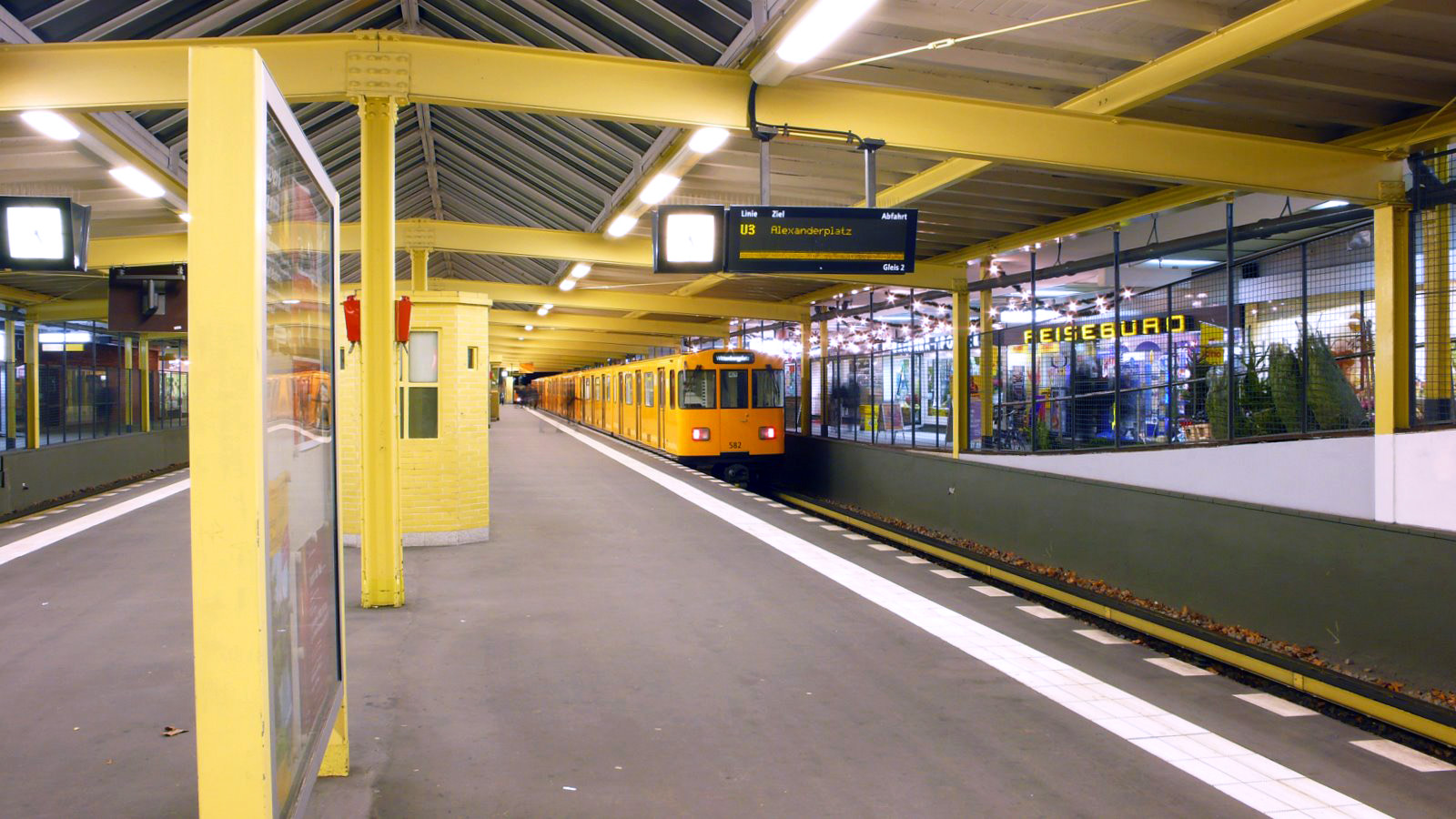
Platform

Onkel Toms Hütte (English: Uncle Tom's Cabin) is a Berlin U-Bahn station located in the Zehlendorf district. Since 12 December 2004 it is served by the U3 line.

== History ==
The station, designed by Alfred Grenander, came into service on 22 December 1929 as the centre of the modernist Onkel Toms Hütte housing estate, built between 1926 and 1932 by architects Bruno Taut, Hugo Häring, and others. Two strip malls and a small cinema were added in 1932.

The name of the area was influenced by Uncle Tom's Cabin, the 1852 anti-slavery novel by Harriet Beecher Stowe, translated into German as Onkel Toms Hütte in the same year. In 1885 a local landlord named Thomas opened a public house at the southern rim of the Grunewald forest and installed several small huts in his beer garden to shelter his guests from the rain. These huts, referred to as "Tom's Cabins", reminded many of the name of the famous book. Over the years the estate, the station, the cinema and the Onkel-Tom-Straße ("Uncle Tom Street") took on the name as well. The pub was demolished in 1979.

== In popular culture ==
- Onkel Toms Hütte station is the location of some key scenes in the 2017 Amazon Video TV series You Are Wanted.

Preceding station	Berlin U-Bahn	Following station
Krumme Lanke Terminus	U3	Oskar-Helene-Heim towards Warschauer Straße
