= U15 (Berlin U-Bahn) =

Former subway line in Berlin, Germany

Overview
- Locale: Berlin
- Termini: Warschauer Straße; Uhlandstraße
- Stations: 13

Service
- Type: Rapid transit
- System: Berlin U-Bahn
- Operator(s): Berliner Verkehrsbetriebe
- Depot(s): Grunewald; Warschauer Straße

History
- Created: 13 November 1993
- Renumbered to U1: 12 December 2004

Technical
- Line length: 9.0 km (5.6 mi)
- Track gauge: 1,435 mm (4 ft 8 1/2 in) standard gauge
- Loading gauge: Kleinprofil
- Electrification: 750 V DC third rail (top running)

The U15 was a line on the Berlin U-Bahn. Originally the U3 running between Wittenbergplatz and Uhlandstraße, it became a branch of the U1 in 1993 as part of the reorganisation of the network following the reopening of the U2.

On December 12, 2004, it was renumbered as the U1.
