= Alsbach =

Alsbach mey refer to the following places in Germany:

- Alsbach, Westerwaldkreis, in the Westerwaldkreis district, Rhineland-Palatinate
- Alsbach-Hähnlein, in the Darmstadt-Dieburg district, Hesse
- Scheibe-Alsbach, a municipality in the Sonneberg district, Thuringia
