= Krumme Lanke station =

Station of the Berlin U-Bahn

Coordinates: 52°26′36″N 13°14′28″E

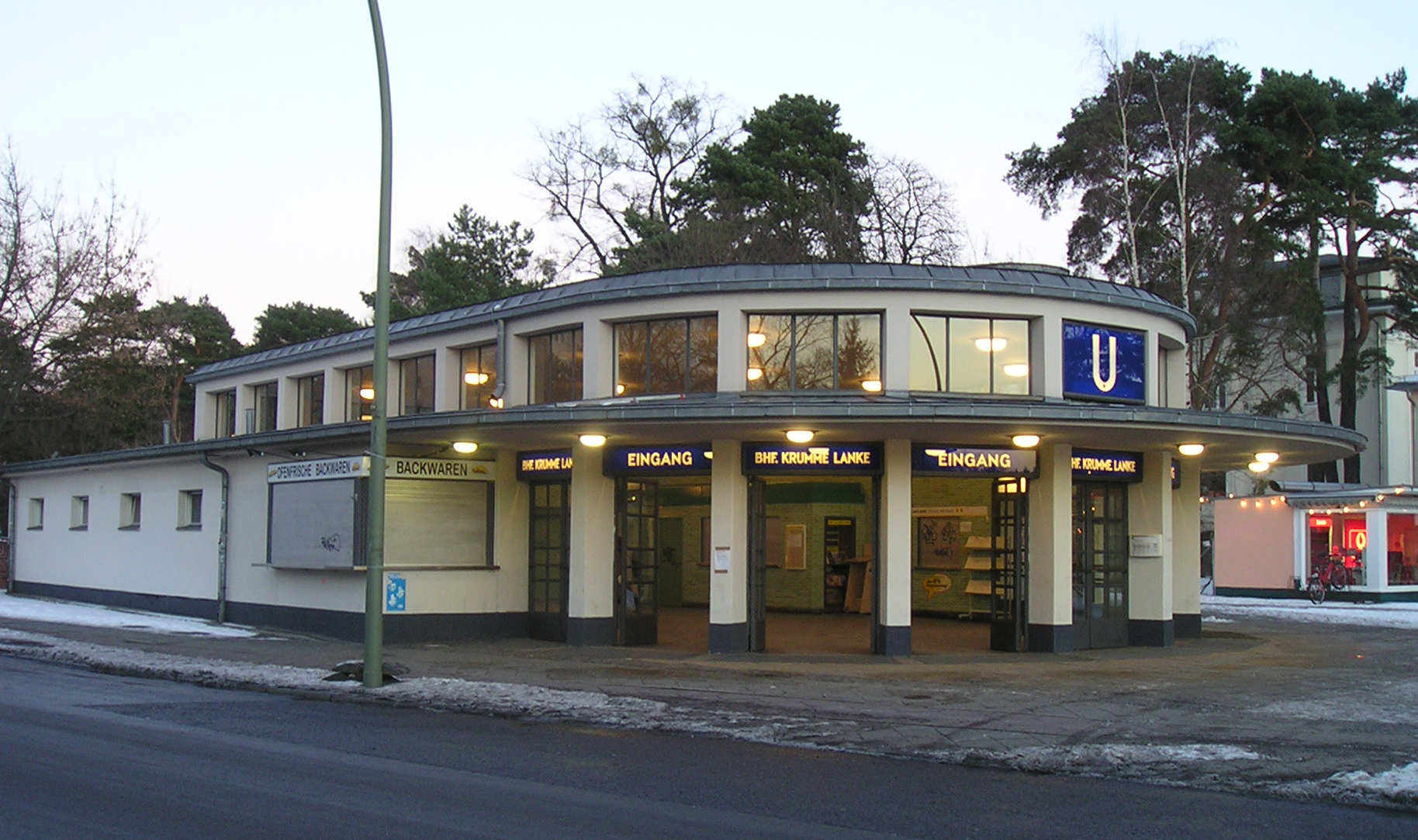
Entrance hall

Krumme Lanke, literally “Crooked Lake“, is a Berlin U-Bahn station on the U3. It is the line's southwestern terminus, located in the Zehlendorf district of Berlin.

== History ==
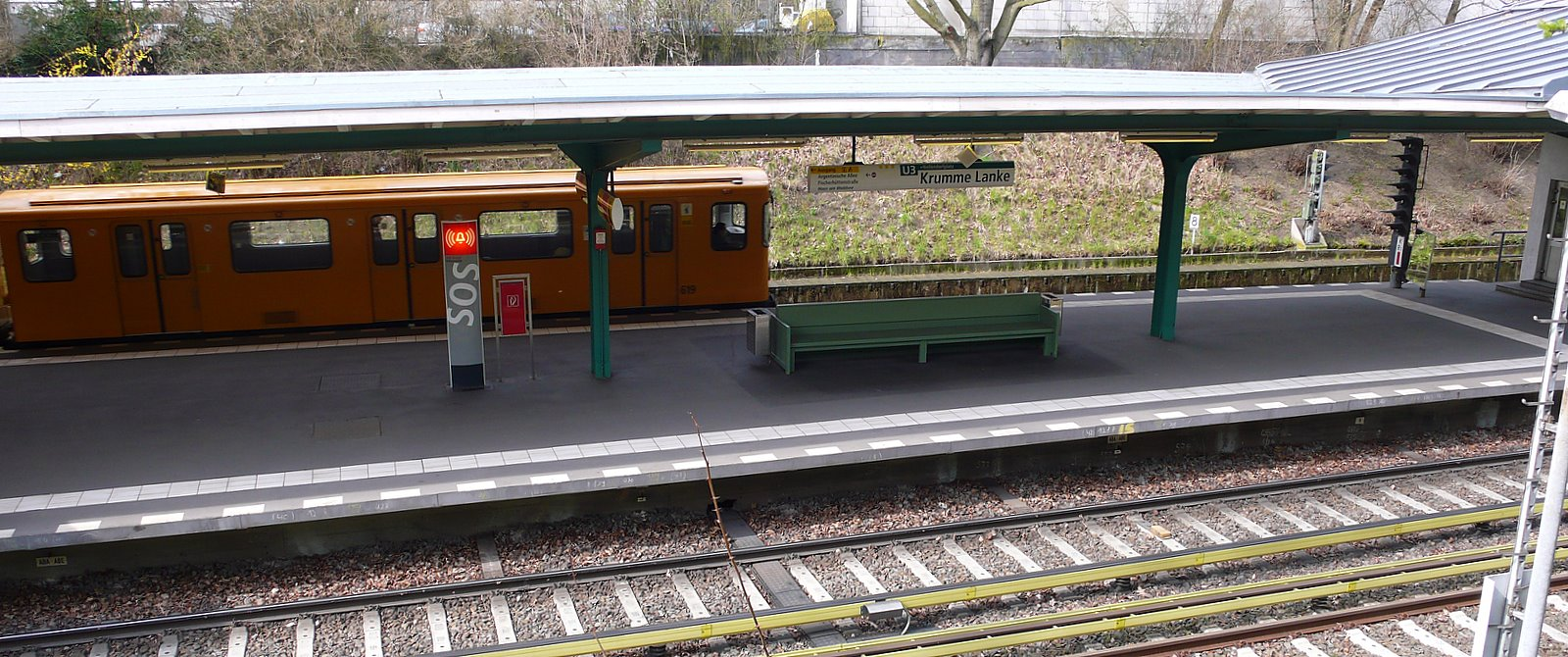
Platform of the station

The station, named after a nearby lake in the Grunewald forest, opened on 22 December 1929. Alfred Grenander designed the entrance hall, which was demolished in 1986 because of its poor condition, but rebuilt in its original form and reopened in 1989.

On 24 May 1944, this station was directly hit by air raids five times.

== Overview ==
Grenander's design of Krumme Lanke station was one of the influences that inspired Charles Holden in his buildings for a number of stations, notably Chiswick Park station, on the 1930-3 extension of the London Underground Piccadilly line.

The platform is below street level, though not underground. Plans to extend the U3 toward the Berlin Mexikoplatz railway station, which is just 1 km (0.6 mi) away, have never been carried out.

Preceding station	Berlin U-Bahn	Following station
Terminus	U3	Onkel Toms Hütte towards Warschauer Straße
