= Stadtmitte station (Berlin U-Bahn) =

Station of the Berlin U-Bahn

Stadtmitte
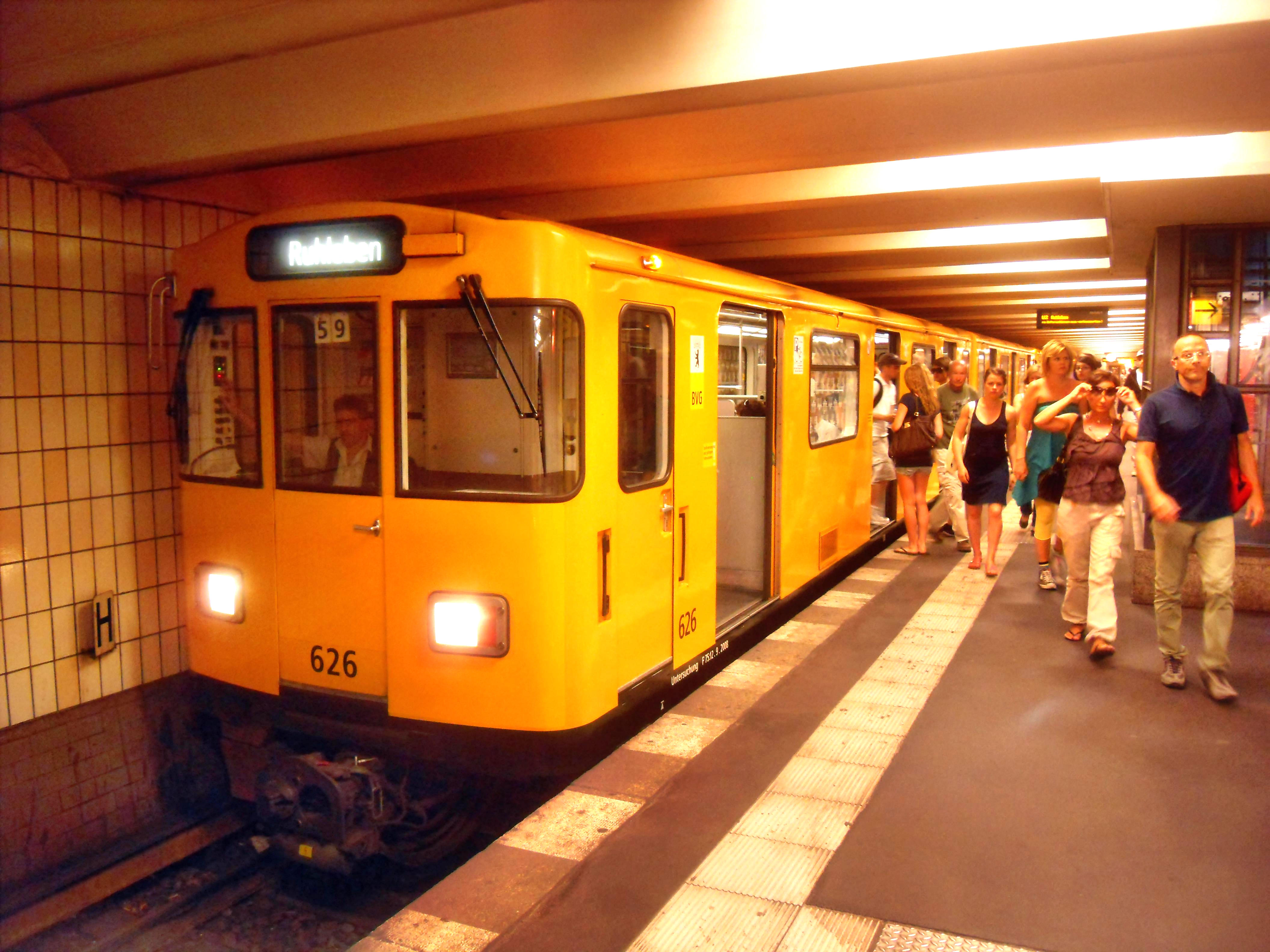
- U2 train to Ruhleben

General information
- Location: Leipziger Straße/Friedrichstraße; Mitte, Berlin; Germany
- Coordinates: 52°30′44″N 13°23′22″E
- Owner: Berliner Verkehrsbetriebe
- Operator: Berliner Verkehrsbetriebe
- Platforms: 2 island platforms (1 on each level)
- Tracks: 4
- Connections: : 200, 265, N2

Construction
- Structure type: Underground
- Cycle facilities: Yes (Call a Bike, bicycle parking)
- Accessible: Yes

Other information
- Fare zone: : Berlin A/5555

History
- Opened: 1 October 1908; 118 years ago (U2); 30 January 1923; 103 years ago (U6)

Services
Preceding station	Berlin U-Bahn	Following station
Anton-Wilhelm-Amo-Straße towards Ruhleben	U2	Hausvogteiplatz towards Pankow
Unter den Linden towards Alt-Tegel	U6	Kochstraße towards Alt-Mariendorf
Former service
Französische Straße towards Alt-Tegel	U6	Kochstraße towards Alt-Mariendorf
Route map
U2 station
U6 station
Location
- Location within Berlin Location within Germany Location within Europe

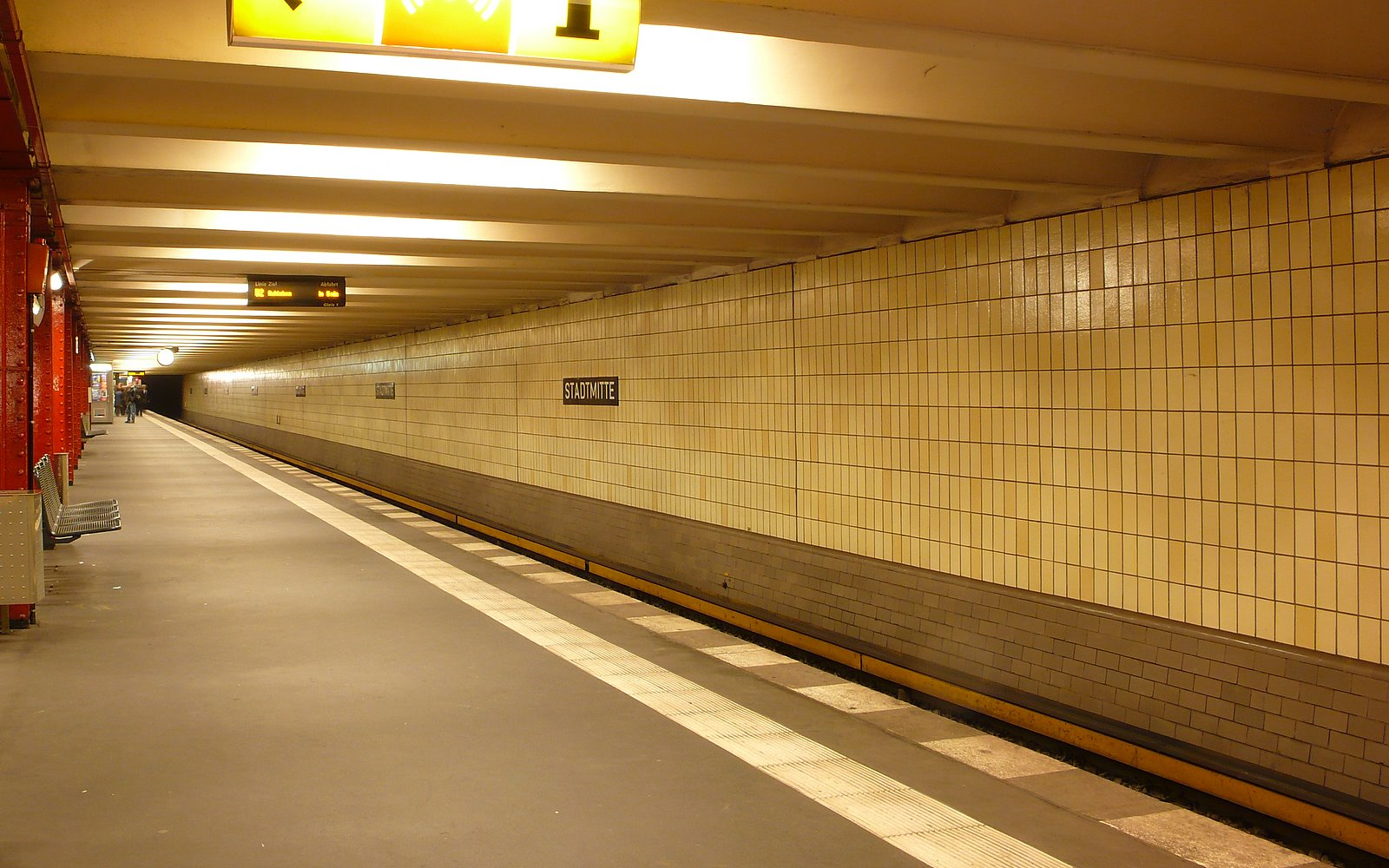
U2 platform

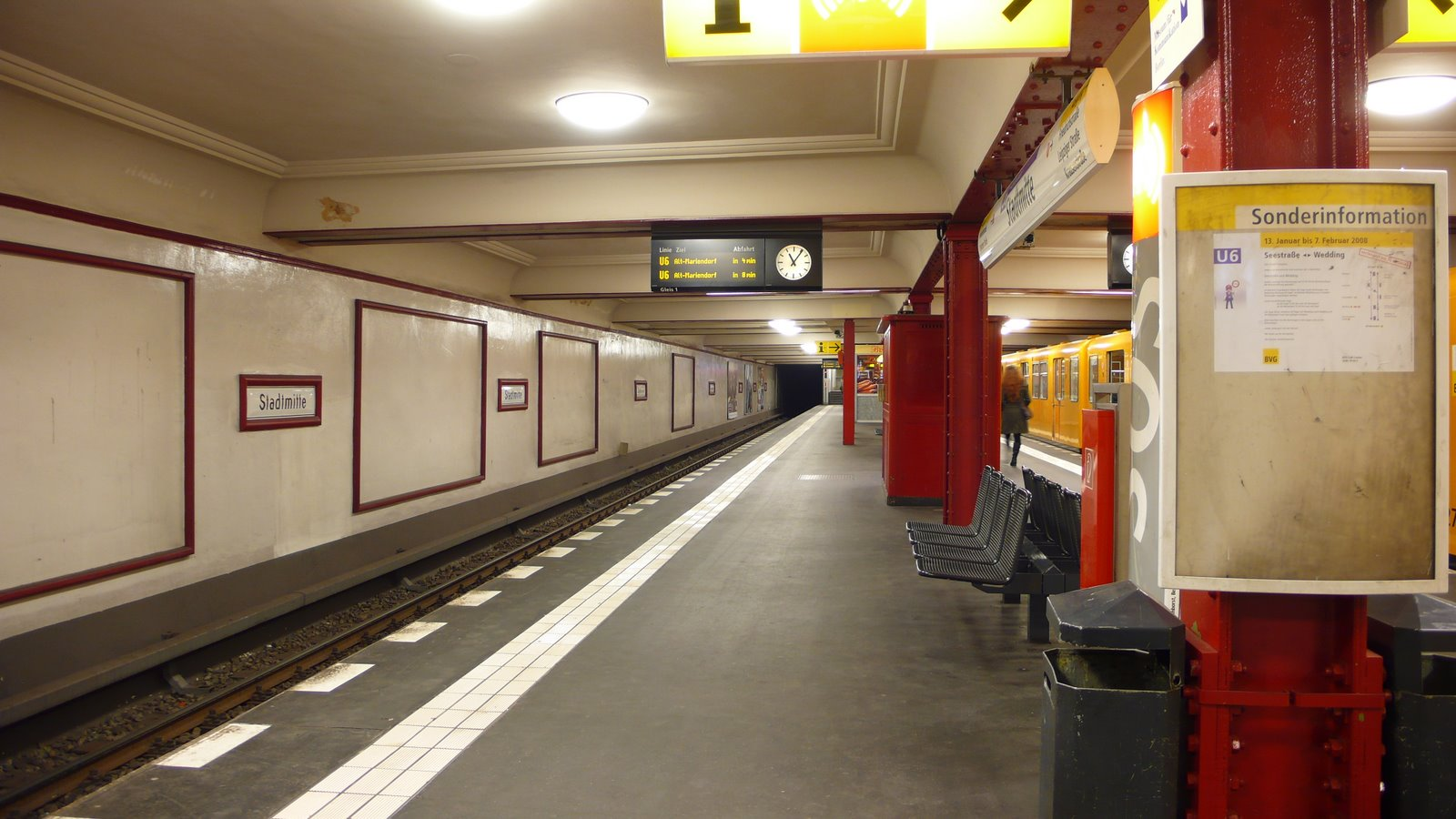
U6 platform

Stadtmitte (German pronunciation: [ˈʃtatˌmɪtə], City Centre) is a Berlin U-Bahn station on lines U2 and U6, located in the Mitte district.

== Overview ==
The U2 platform opened on 1 October 1908 with the new U-Bahn section from Potsdamer Platz to Spittelmarkt. The station beneath the crossing of Friedrichstraße and Mohrenstraße was designed by Alfred Grenander and initially called Friedrichstraße. The second platform of the present-day U6 was finished on 30 January 1923, but was built about 160 m (520 ft) southwards at the intersection of Friedrichstraße and Leipziger Straße, the main east-west thoroughfare of the Friedrichstadt quarter. The platforms are connected by a pedestrian underpass colloquially called the Mäusetunnel ("mouse tunnel"). The station received its current name in 1936.

This station was heavily damaged in World War II. On 7 May 1944, massive fire damage broke out in the entire station area. On 3 February 1945, there was heavy destruction in the entire station area involving gunshots, which was already badly damaged by fire. Several pillars were literally torn from their anchorage. A wall was pushed in by pure air pressure. The ceiling was later destroyed in the Battle of Berlin.

The U6 station was closed from 13 August 1961 due to the construction of the Berlin Wall. This station was also once a border station, and it is well connected to the U2 station. It looks nearly identical to the Schwartzkopffstraße station, the only difference being the presence of the compound where the tracks have become storerooms. Rolls of barbed wire were also installed to prevent escapees from crawling, and the entrances and transfer linkways were all locked with baby-lock gates. Armed guards were stationed at the southern side of the entrance. All were eliminated by 29 June 1990, and the station reopened on 1 July 1990.
