= Märkisches Museum station =

Station of the Berlin U-Bahn

Coordinates: 52°30′43″N 13°24′32″E

Märkisches Museum
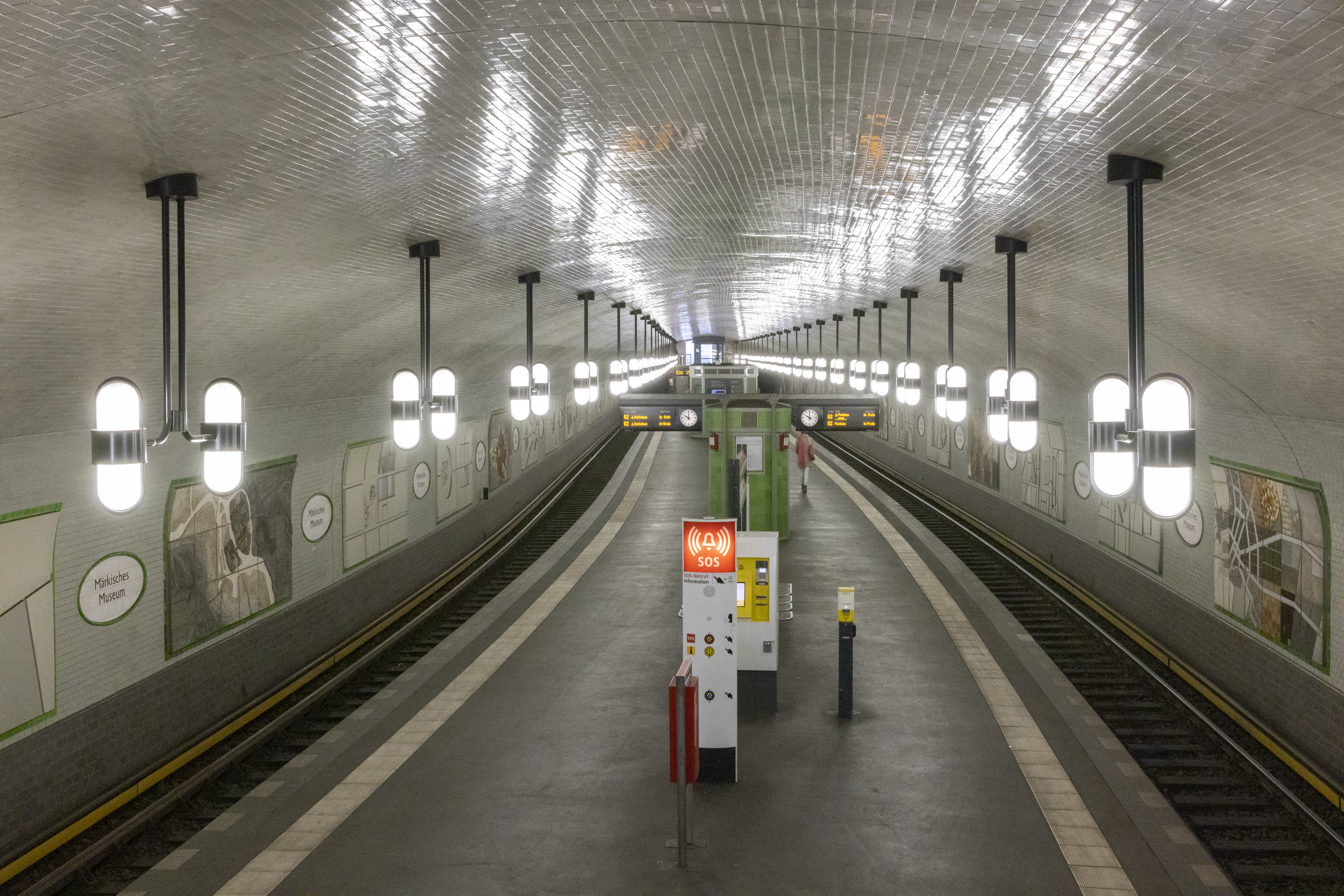
- Platform at Märkisches Museum facing towards Pankow

General information
- Location: Berlin; Germany
- Owner: BVG
- Operator: BVG
- Platforms: 1 island platform
- Tracks: 2
- Train operators: U-Bahn Berlin
- Connections: 147, 165, 265

Construction
- Structure type: Underground
- Parking: No
- Accessible: No

History
- Opened: 1 July 1913; 113 years ago

Services
Preceding station	Berlin U-Bahn	Following station
Spittelmarkt towards Ruhleben	U2	Klosterstraße towards Pankow
Route map
Location
- Location within Berlin Location within Germany Location within Europe

Märkisches Museum is a Berlin U-Bahn station located on the U2 in the Mitte district. Since 1935 it has been named after the nearby Märkisches Museum, the municipal museum of the history of Berlin and the Mark Brandenburg.

== Design ==
In the course of the extension of the then so-called Spittelmarktlinie as a center line to Alexanderplatz was the station island bridge in the immediate vicinity of the bank in the subsequent route to crossing the Spree, which is why it was buried six and a half meters below the street level, unusually deep for that time.

Thanks to its deep location, Alfred Grenander, as an architect, was able to equip the station with a large and spacious hall and a wicker arch vault. Because of this unusual construction in Berlin, the station was often associated with those of the Paris Métro. In the Berlin subway network, only the subway stations Märkisches Museum and Platz der Luftbrücke. have such a columnless construction.

The central platform is 121.3 meters long and 7.6 meters wide; The hall is 5.2 meters high at its highest point.

For the station, as well as for the station Leipziger Platz, Grenander chose the color code green, because its color scheme for this distance provided for a regular repetition of the colors. The station, which has a small mezzanine floor at each end, received a 121.3 meters long and 7.6 meters wide central platform.

After lengthy construction work, the elevated railway company started operation on 1 July 1913 on the 1.7 kilometer Spittelmarkt - Alexanderplatz line.

== History ==
The station, then called Inselbrücke, opened on 1 July 1913 in the course of the eastern continuation of Berlin's second U-Bahn line from Spittelmarkt to Alexanderplatz. Architect Alfred Grenander designed a vaulted hall relatively deep beneath street level due to the depth of the adjacent Spree underpass leading to Klosterstrasse. It was renamed in 1935 to Märkisches Museum. On 24 May 1944, aerial bombing caused slight damage to the ceiling. In early April 1945, an air raid damaged the seal of the subway tunnel under the Spree between the stations Klosterstraße and Märkisches Museum. As a result, the tunnel was filled using explosives.

On 31 July 1945 Märkisches Museum station was put back into operation. Initially it was the terminus of a shuttle service to Stadtmitte. Until 1 November 1945 the Spree underpass to the underground station Klosterstraße could initially be restored in a single track. On 15 September 1946, the circulation operation between Pankow and Ruhleben was again complete, at least until the construction of the wall interrupted the line.

In 1987 and 1988, as part of events for the 750th anniversary of Berlin, the GDR government commissioned decorations for the station with the theme of "the history of Berlin". Artist Jo Does constructed twelve mosaics depicting maps of the city of Berlin, from its beginnings as the twin towns of Berlin and Cölln in 1237 through to the modern city in 1987 (where only East Berlin is shown), with each mosaic being constructed from building materials that would have been used in the city at the time (stone cobbles in the first map, later other forms of stone, brick, marble, cement, etc.). There are two copies of each of six maps on opposite walls of the station, one set near each track. In between the maps are reliefs by artists Karl-Heinz Schäfer and Ulrich Jörke, each in a style appropriate to the time period of the adjacent map (from Renaissance at the start through to socialist realism at the end); unlike the maps, each side of the station has unique reliefs.

== Current Operations ==
Märkisches Museum is operated by BVG, the provider of most of Berlin's rapid transit. Situated on the U2 line, trains from Märkisches Museum serve Pankow to the north, stopping at significant destinations such as Alexanderplatz, and Ruhleben to the west, stopping at Potsdamer Platz, Kurfürstendamm and the Olympic Stadium.

== Gallery ==
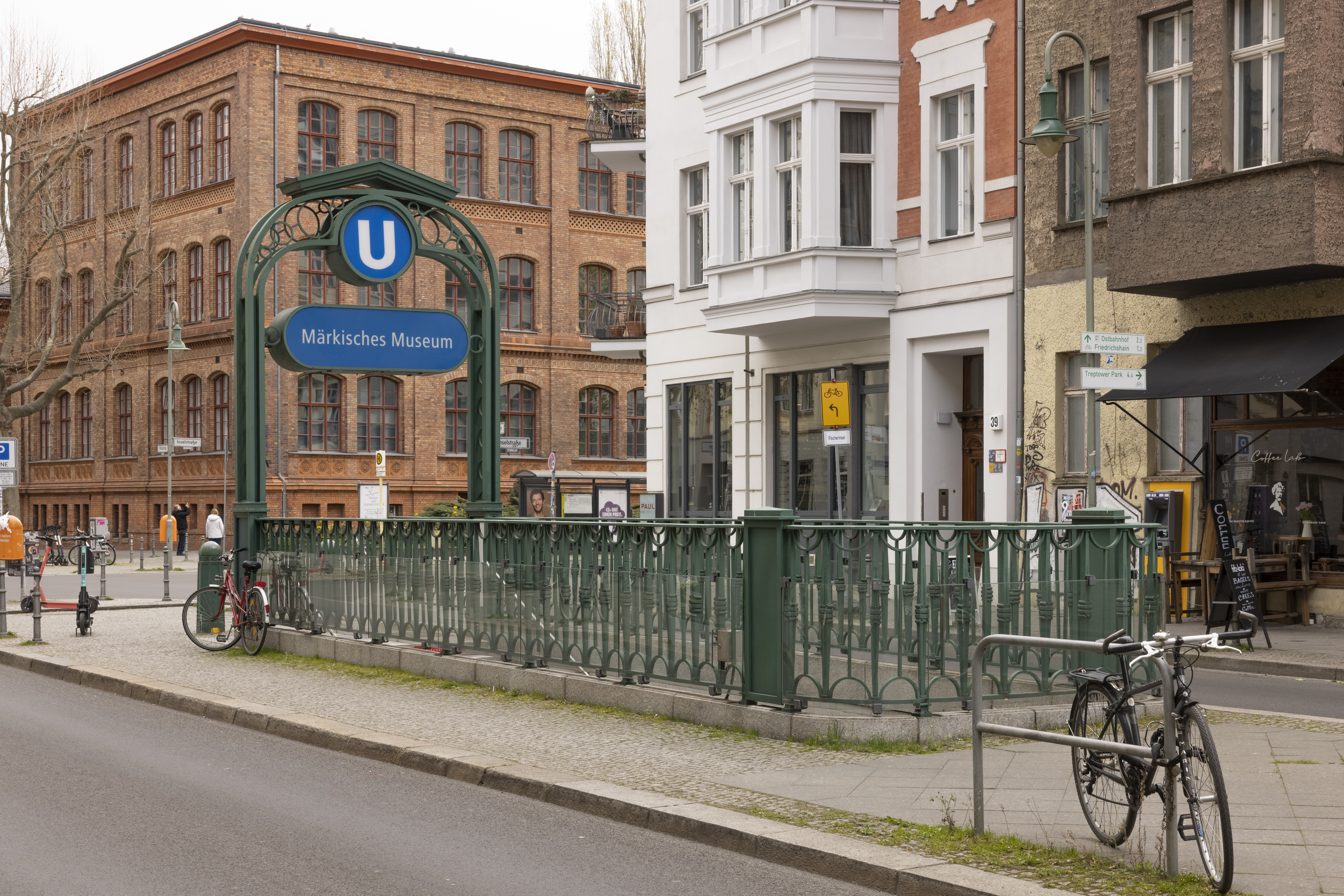
Entrance on Wallstraße

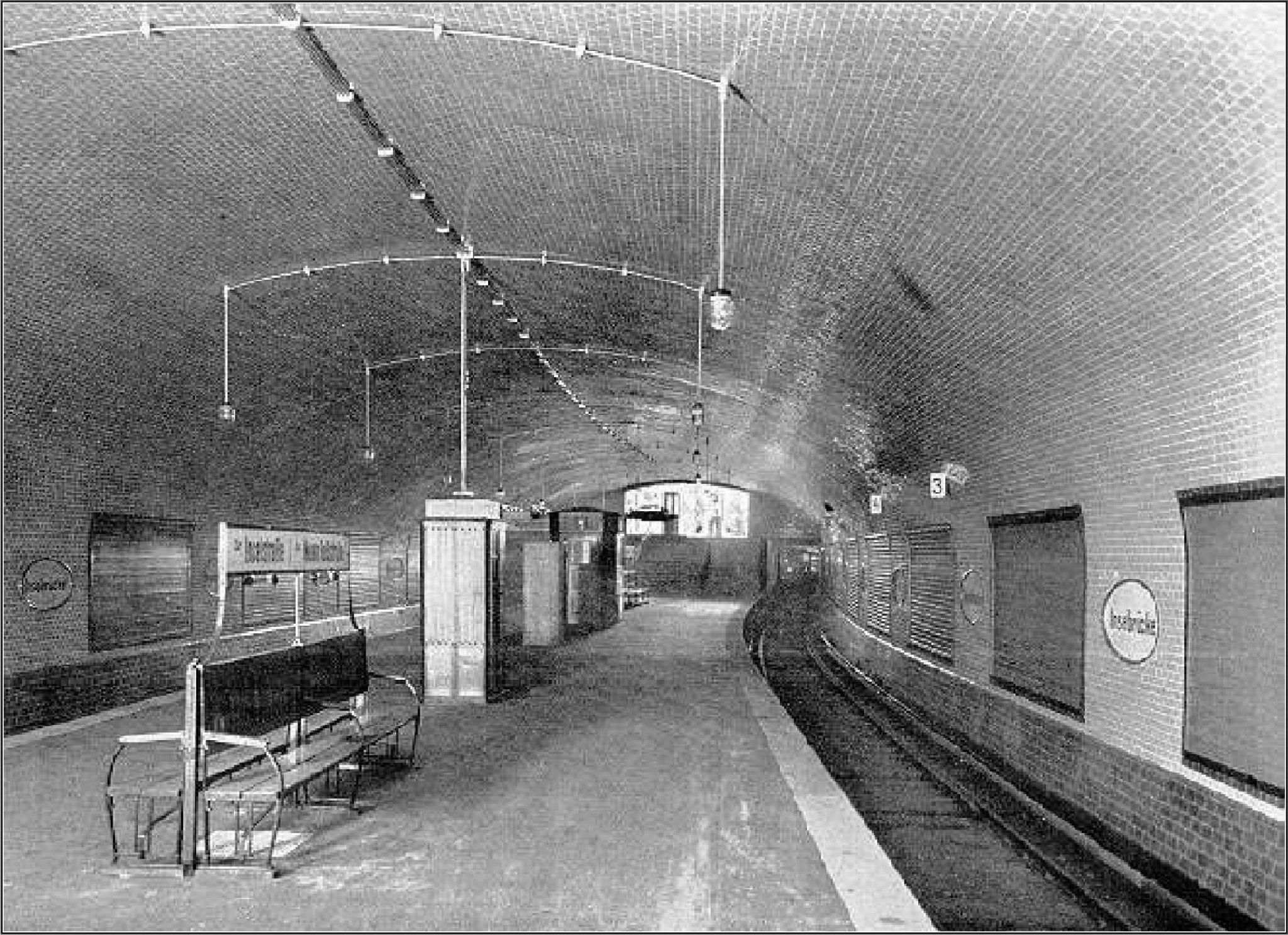
Inselbrücke station at opening, 1913
