= Leipziger Straße =

Street in Berlin, Germany

- Leipziger Strasse
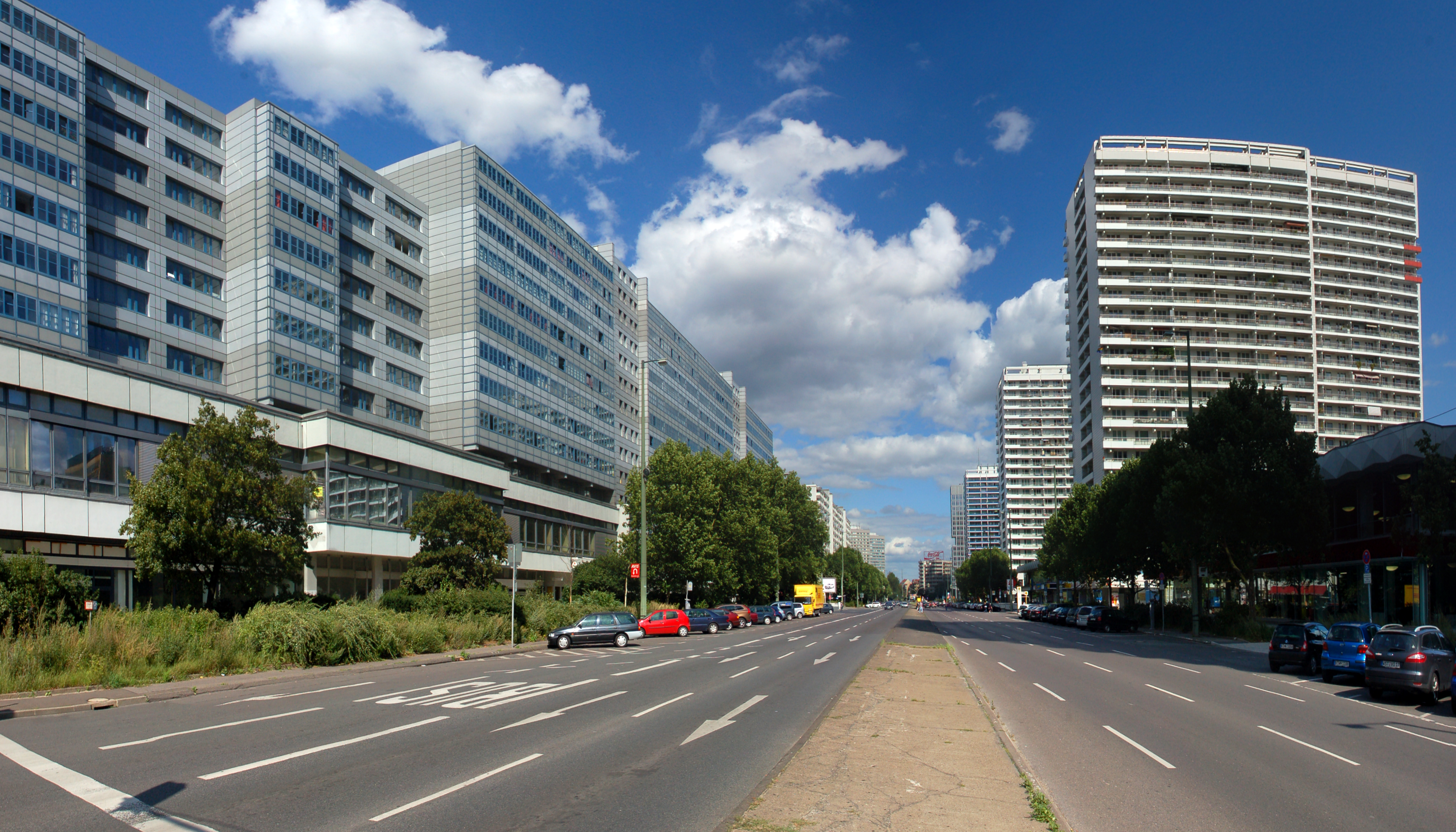
- View east along the street in 2009
- Interactive map of Leipziger Straße
- Former names: Mauerstraße–Spittelkolonnaden: An der Spitalbrücke; (1688–1775); West of Mauerstraße: Potsdamer Straße; (1734–1775); Spittelkolonnaden–Spittelmarkt: An der Spitalbrücke; (after 1688–1775)
- Part of: Bundesstraße 1
- Namesake: Leipzig
- Type: Thoroughfare
- Length: c. 1,500 m (4,900 ft)
- Location: Berlin, Germany
- Quarter: Mitte
- Nearest metro station: Potsdamer Platz; Mohrenstraße; Stadtmitte; Spittelmarkt
- Coordinates: 52°30′37″N 13°23′25″E
- West end: Potsdamer Straße; Potsdamer Platz; Stresemannstraße; Ebertstraße; Leipziger Platz
- Major junctions: Wilhelmstrasse; Mauerstraße; Friedrichstraße; Charlottenstraße; Markgrafenstraße; Jerusalemer Straße; Marion-Gräfin-Dönhoff-Platz; Axel-Springer-Straße
- East end: Seydelstraße; Niederwallstraße; Wallstraße; Spittelmarkt; Gertraudenstraße

Construction
- Inauguration: Generally: 1688; Current name: 1775

Leipziger Straße (German pronunciation: [ˈlaɪptsɪɡɐ ˈʃtʁaːsə]), or Leipziger Strasse (see ß), is a major thoroughfare in the central Mitte district of Berlin, capital of Germany. It runs from Leipziger Platz, an octagonal square adjacent to Potsdamer Platz in the west, to Spittelmarkt in the east. Part of the Bundesstraße 1 highway, it is today one of the city's main east–west road links.

== History ==
Leipziger Straße has existed along this line since about the Baroque Friedrichstadt extension, laid out in 1688 at the behest of Elector Frederick III of Brandenburg. It was named after Leipzig Gate near Spittelmarkt, part of the Berlin Fortress which was finally slighted in 1738. In 1734 the road was extended up to the new Potsdam Gate, present-day Potsdamer Platz, one of the western entrances in what was then the Berlin Customs Wall.

Near the eastern end, Leipziger Straße traversed Dönhoffplatz, named after Prussian general lieutenant Alexander von Dönhoff (1683–1742), where an obelisk marked the zero point of the mileage on the road to Potsdam. Prime minister Karl August von Hardenberg (1750–1822) had a city palais built here, which from 1848 served as seat of the Prussian Landtag. Around the corner a Concerthaus was erected in the 1860s, the concert hall of the Benjamin Bilse orchestra, predecessor of the Berlin Philharmonic. Next to it Oscar Tietz opened his first department store in 1900, financed by his uncle Hermann Tietz (Hertie), starting the development of Leipziger Straße into a major shopping street.

Nearby is the intersection with Jerusalemer Straße, named after Jerusalem Church, one of Berlin's oldest churches, dating from the late 15th century, rebuilt in the 19th century according to plans designed by Karl Friedrich Schinkel. The church was heavily damaged by Allied bombing in World War II and its ruins were demolished by the Senate of West Berlin in March 1961 to build the Axel Springer AG headquarters.

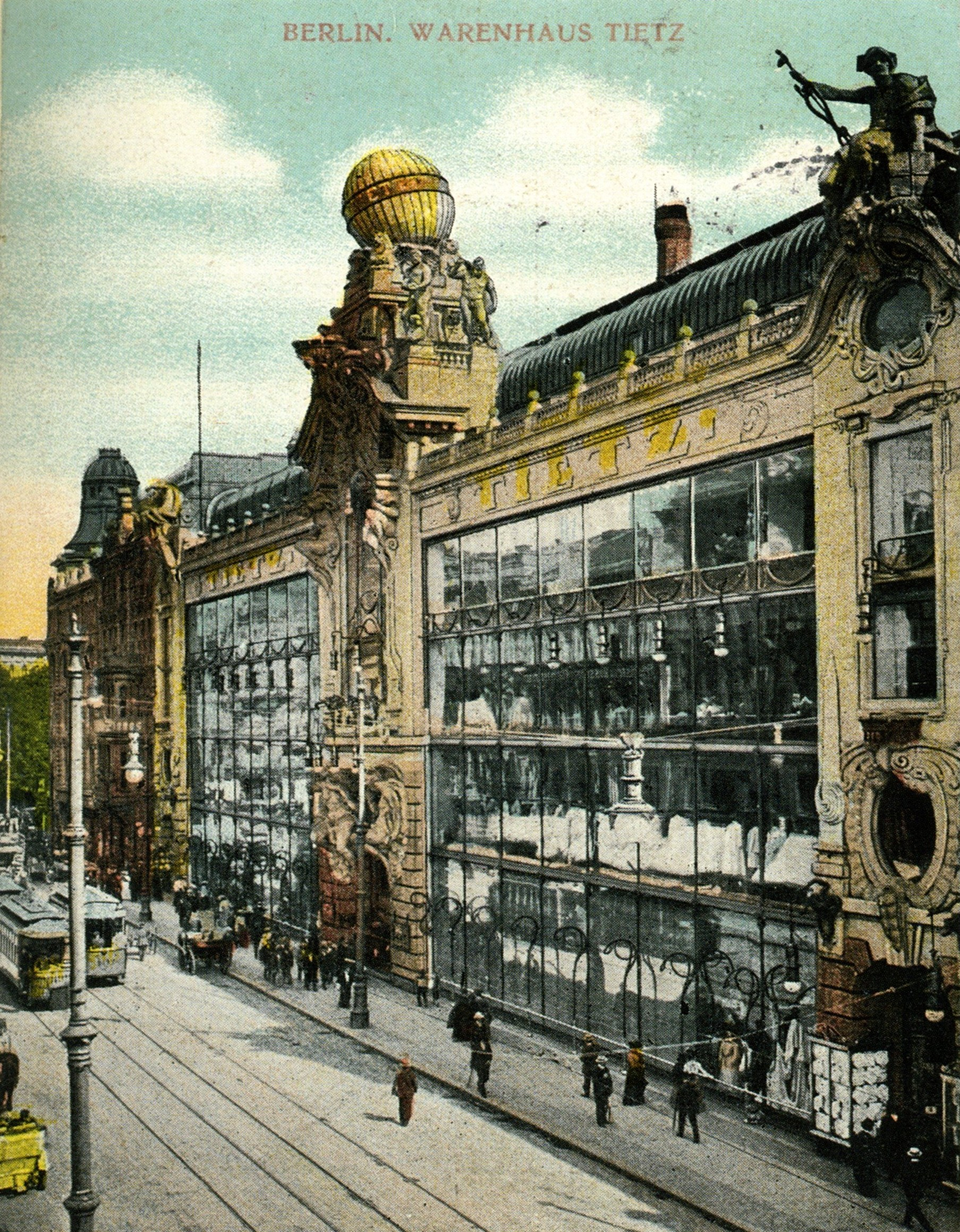
Tietz department store, 1916

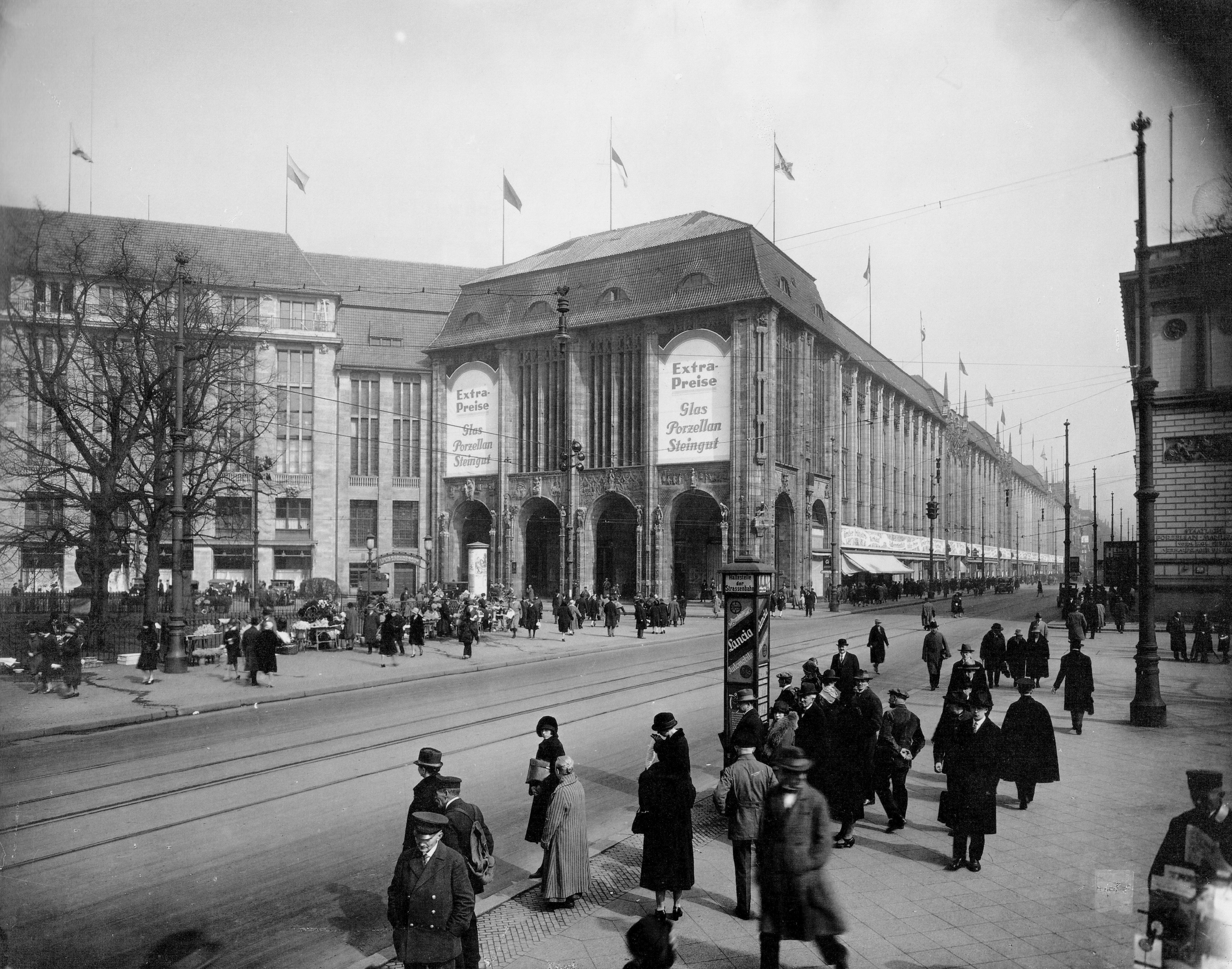
Wertheim department store in the 1920s

At its western end Leipziger Platz was given its current name in 1815 in celebration of the Coalition victory over the French Empire at the Battle of Leipzig, and it is sometimes assumed that Leipziger Straße was named at the same time: in fact it already had this name after the historic trade route to Leipzig. On the corner with Leipziger Straße stood the Wertheim department store, then the biggest in Europe. Demolished in 1955/56 the preserved basement of its ruins housed the Tresor techno nightclub in the 1990s. It is now the site of the Mall of Berlin shopping mall.

The area around the Wilhelmstraße intersection before World War II was one of the centres of German national administration, being the location of various governmental buildings.

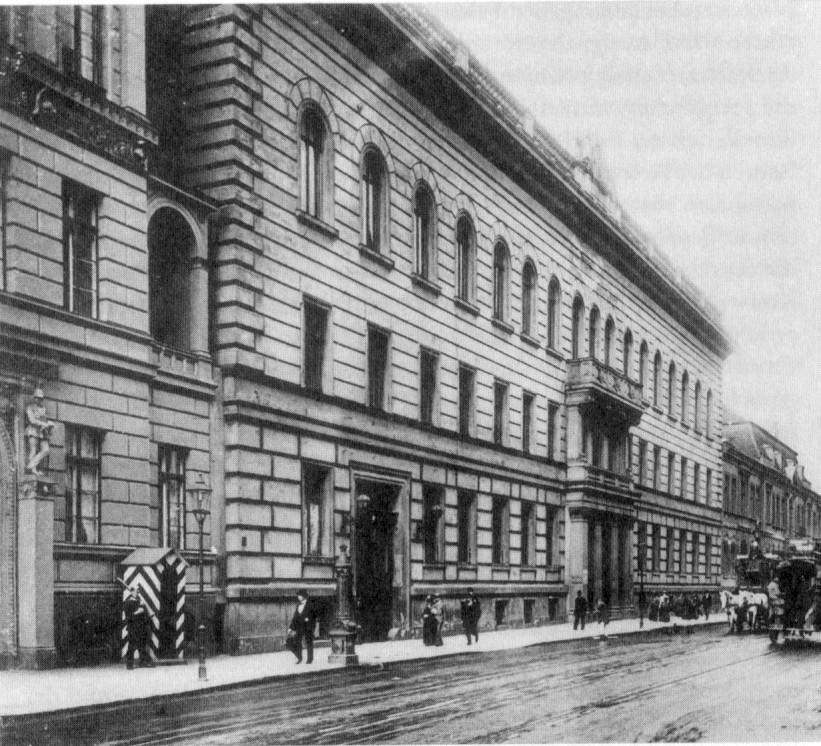
Reichstag until 1894

Near Leipziger Platz was the first seat of the German Reichstag parliament, before the inauguration of the Reichstag building in 1894.

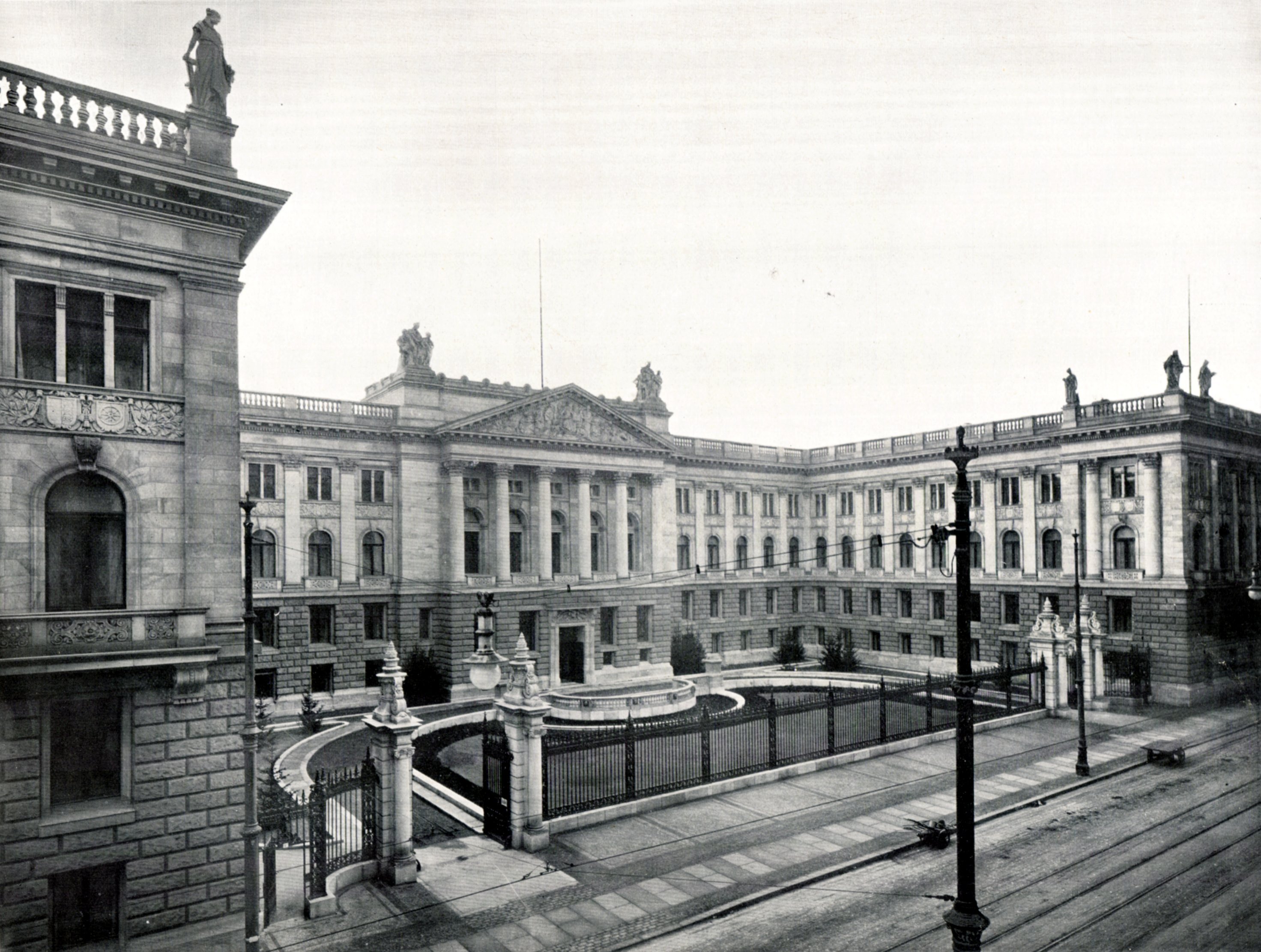
Prussian House of Lords, around 1900

The neighbouring house, former residence of Abraham Mendelssohn Bartholdy (1776–1835), was purchased by the Prussian state in 1856 as seat of the Prussian House of Lords. The present-day building which now houses the Bundesrat, the upper house of the German Parliament, was erected between 1899 and 1903. After the House of Lords was abolished in 1918, the building became the seat of the Prussian State Council of the Free State of Prussia, where delegates from the provinces met for annual sittings. The Cologne mayor Konrad Adenauer served as president of this body until the Nazi Machtergreifung in 1933, when the building became the seat of the Stiftung Preußenhaus (Preußenhaus Foundation), controlled by Hermann Göring. The building suffered severe damage during World War II, but was repaired and used during the GDR period to house several government offices, where the East German government was seized by insurgents during the Uprising of 17 June 1953. The Bundesrat held its first session in this building in 2000.

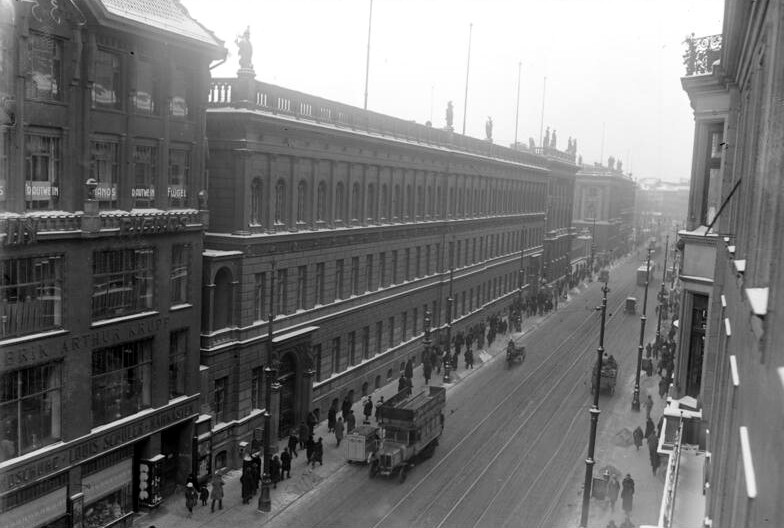
Prussian Ministry of War main building on Leipziger Straße 5

At Leipziger Straße 5, neighbouring house of House of Lords was the main building of Prussian Ministry of War with a great garden behind the building.

Between 1933 and 1936 Hermann Göring oversaw the construction of the vast Reich Air Ministry building next to the Preußenhaus at Leipziger Straße No. 7, on the corner of Wilhelmstraße. After 1949, when Leipziger Straße was located in East Berlin, the barely damaged complex became the headquarters of the GDR Council of Ministers. Today it houses the German Federal Ministry of Finance. Further east was the Reichspost Ministry building, today home of the Museum for Communication.

== Today ==
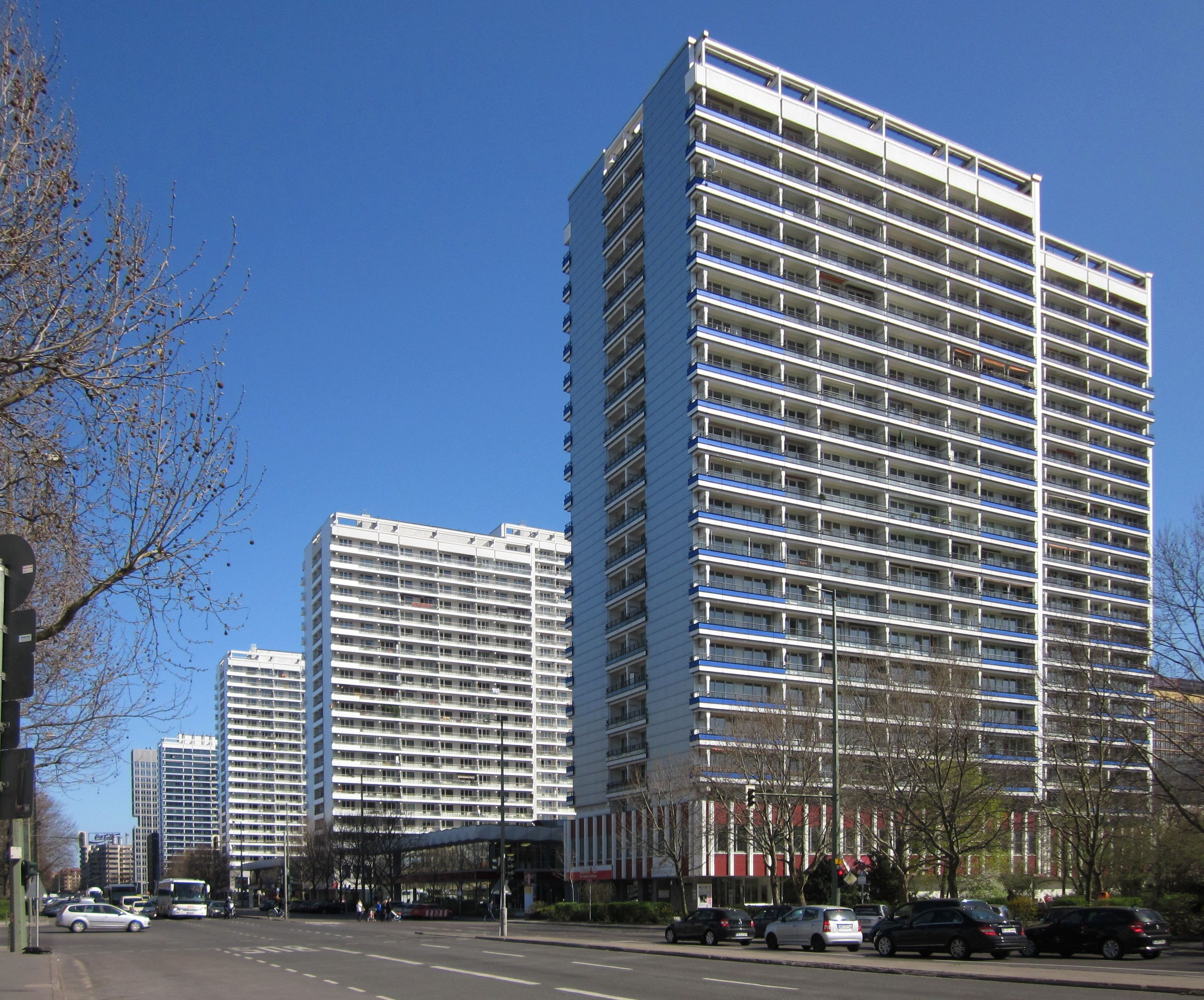
Komplex Leipziger Straße buildings

Large sections of Leipziger Straße were destroyed in World War II. Upon the erection of the Berlin Wall, the east–west connection at Potsdamer Platz was closed. Despite the low traffic volume, the eastern half of the road between Spittelmarkt and Charlottenstraße from 1969 onwards was broadened and rebuilt as a prestigious street of a Socialist capital with four car lanes in each direction, a median and broad pavements including an underpass for pedestrians. On both sides large housing estates of the Komplex Leipziger Straße were erected. Dönhoffplatz was rebuilt as a green area and decorated with the reconstructed 18th century colonnades by Carl von Gontard, installed roughly at the historic site.

The western half of the road retained its historic dimensions and has been newly built-up almost completely since German reunification. The main building of German Bundesrat is located there. A tram line from Alexanderplatz to Potsdamer Platz along Leipziger Straße is planned, tracks are already installed on some sections. Other buildings along Leipziger Straße include the Bulgarian and New Zealand embassies.
