= Hausvogteiplatz station =

Station of the Berlin U-Bahn

Hausvogteiplatz
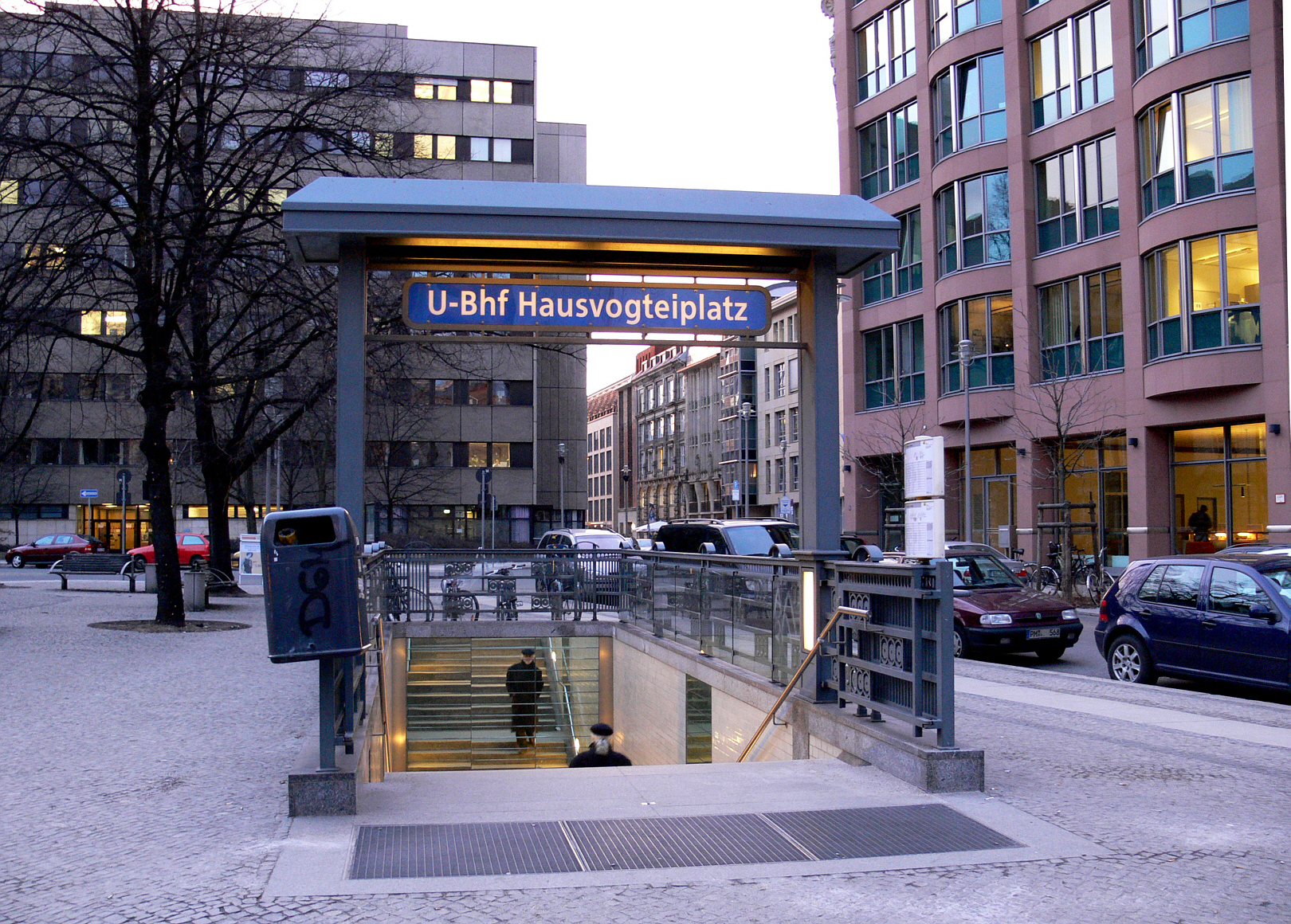
- Eastern entrance, 2006

General information
- Location: Hausvogteiplatz; Mitte, Berlin; Germany
- Coordinates: 52°30′47″N 13°23′48″E
- Owner: Berliner Verkehrsbetriebe
- Operator: Berliner Verkehrsbetriebe
- Platforms: 1 island platform
- Tracks: 2

Construction
- Structure type: Underground
- Cycle facilities: Yes (Call a Bike, bicycle parking)
- Accessible: No

Other information
- Fare zone: : Berlin A/5555

History
- Opened: 1 October 1908; 118 years ago

Services
Preceding station	Berlin U-Bahn	Following station
Stadtmitte towards Ruhleben	U2	Spittelmarkt towards Pankow
Route map
Location
- Location within Berlin Location within Germany Location within Europe

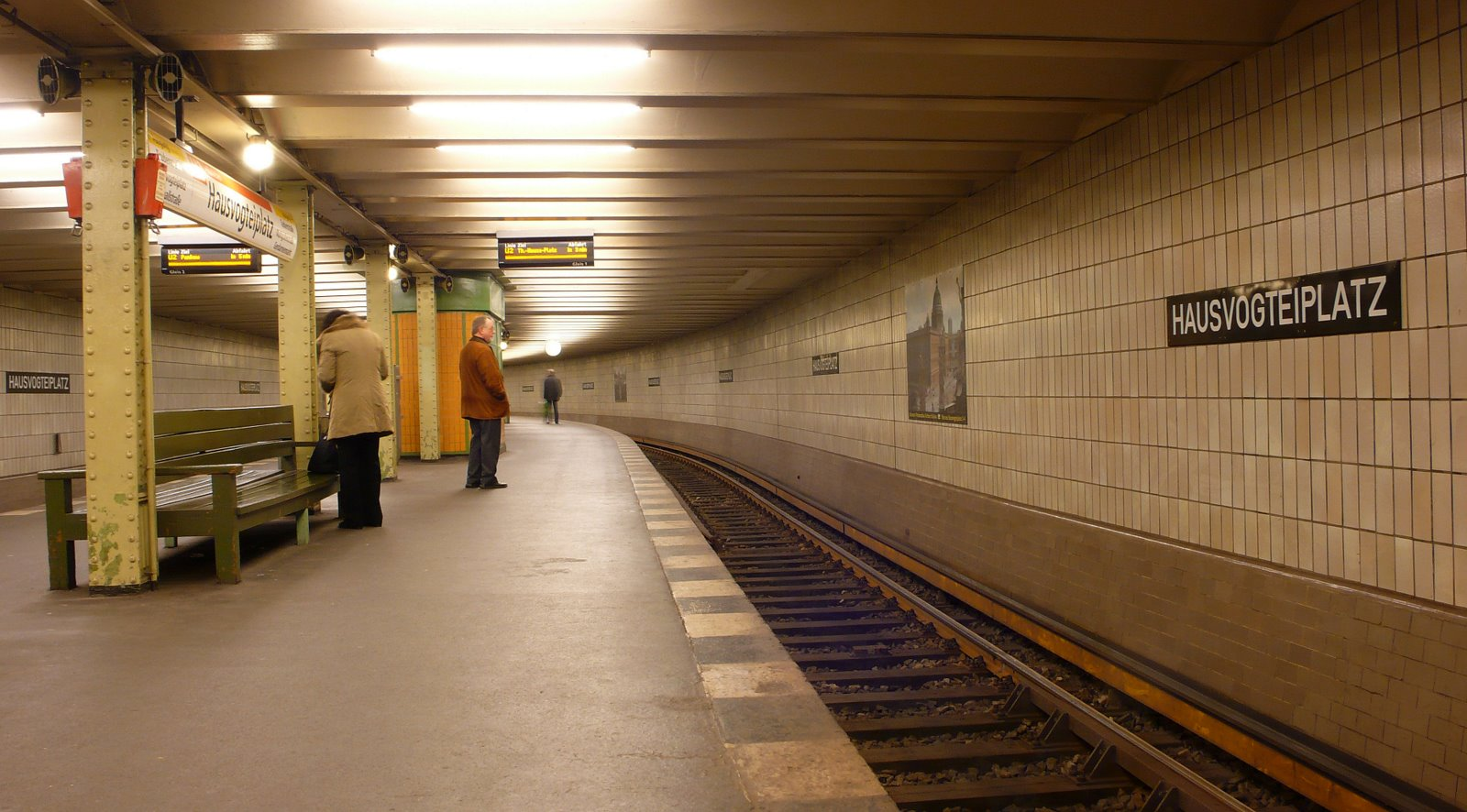
Station platform

Hausvogteiplatz is a Berlin U-Bahn station on line U2, located in Mitte. The eponymous square, former site of a bastion of the historic city fortification (Berlin Fortress), was named after the Prussian aulic court and prison. In the late 19th century it had developed as a centre of Berlin's clothing industry.

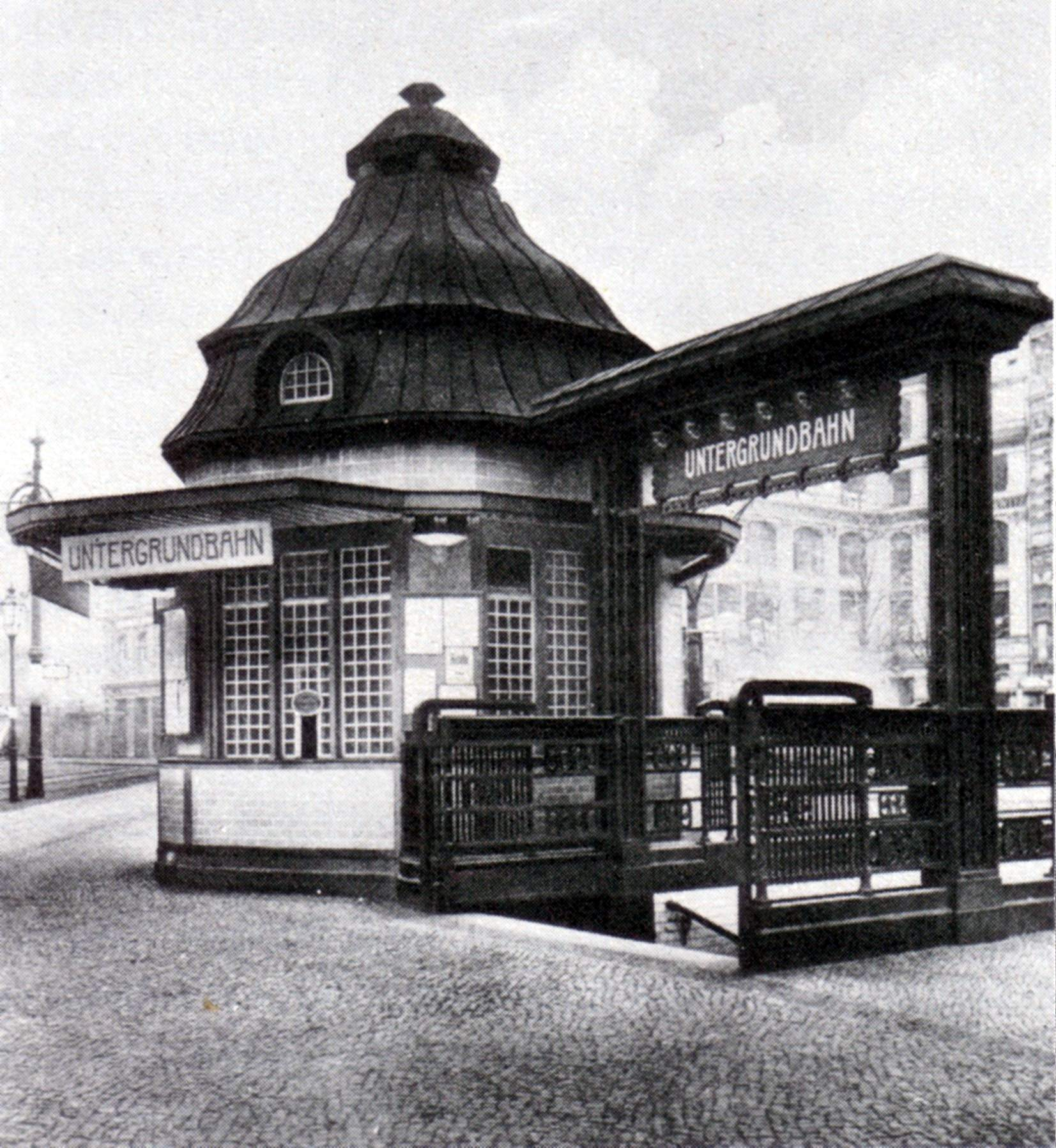
Entrance, 1908

The station, designed by Alfred Grenander, opened on 1 October 1908 with Berlin's second U-Bahn line, running from Potsdamer Platz on the initial Stammstrecke route to Spittelmarkt. During an air raid on 3 February 1945 it was devastated by a direct bomb hit and could not be reopened until 1950.
