= Magdalenenstraße station =

Station of the Berlin U-Bahn

Coordinates: 52°30′45″N 13°29′11″E

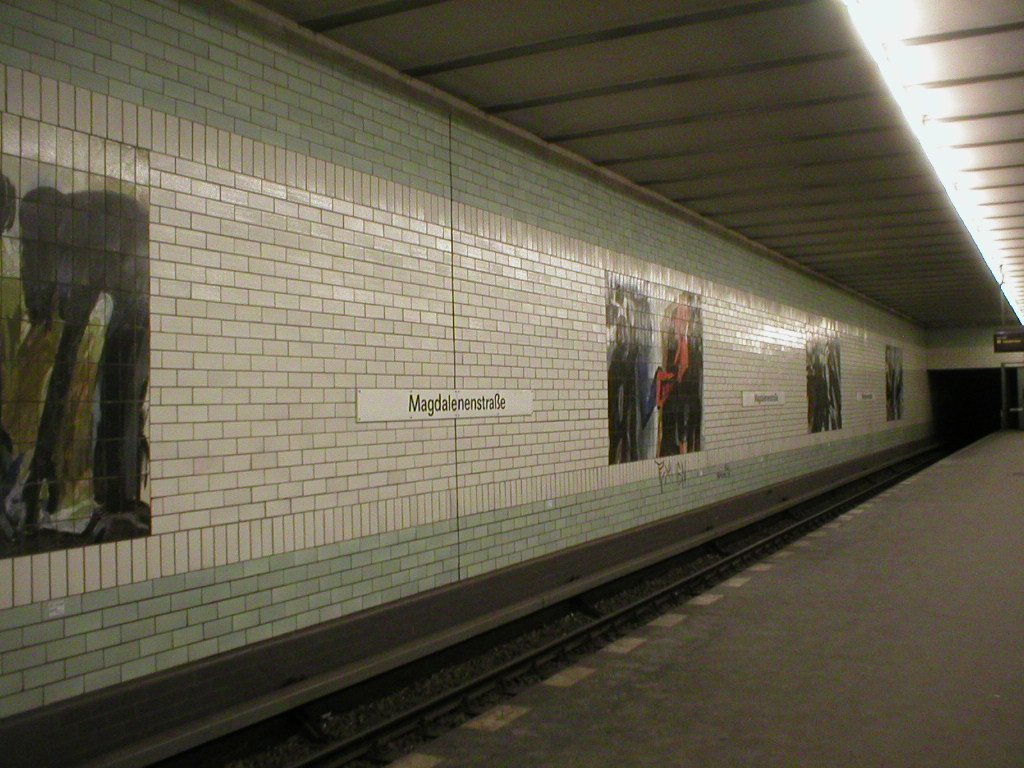
U-Bahn station Magdalenenstraße before its 2003 renovation

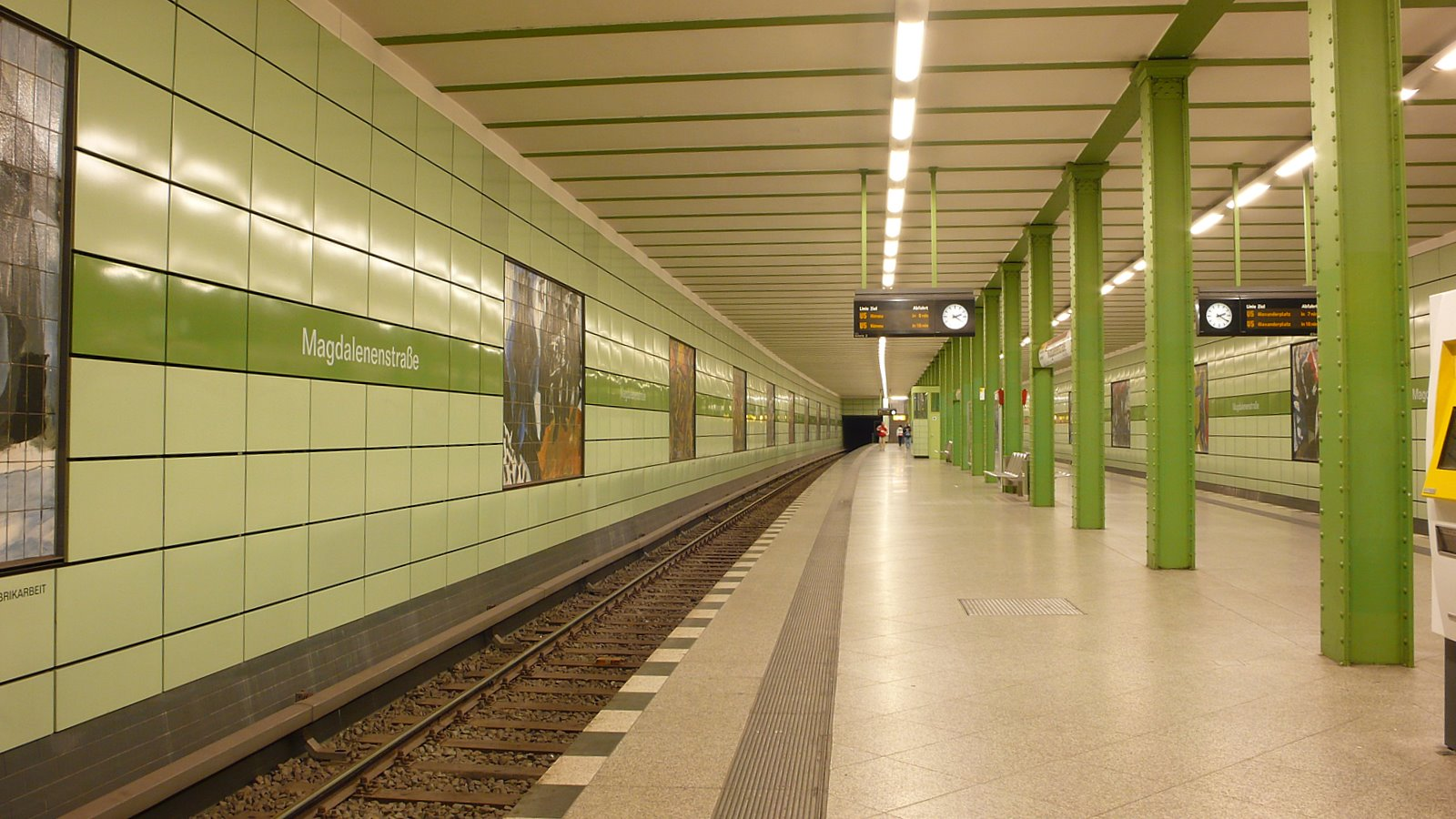
The station after renovation

Magdalenenstraße is a Berlin U-Bahn station located on the U5 line.

The station was designed by the Swedish architect Alfred Grenander and it was opened for service in 1930. It was closed for a few months in 1945 and was renovated in 2004–05.

The walls are covered with green panels and the columns are also painted green. The 20 artworks of the East German artists Wolfgang Frankenstein and Hartmut Hornung from 1986 are displayed on the walls. They are painted in a very abstract way and show the history of the German workers' movement. In 1995 these paintings were to have been covered by advertisements, but this was prevented by the culture department of the Berliner Senat.

Preceding station	Berlin U-Bahn	Following station
Frankfurter Allee towards Berlin Hbf	U5	Lichtenberg towards Hönow
