= Alfred Grenander =

Swedish architect (1863–1931)

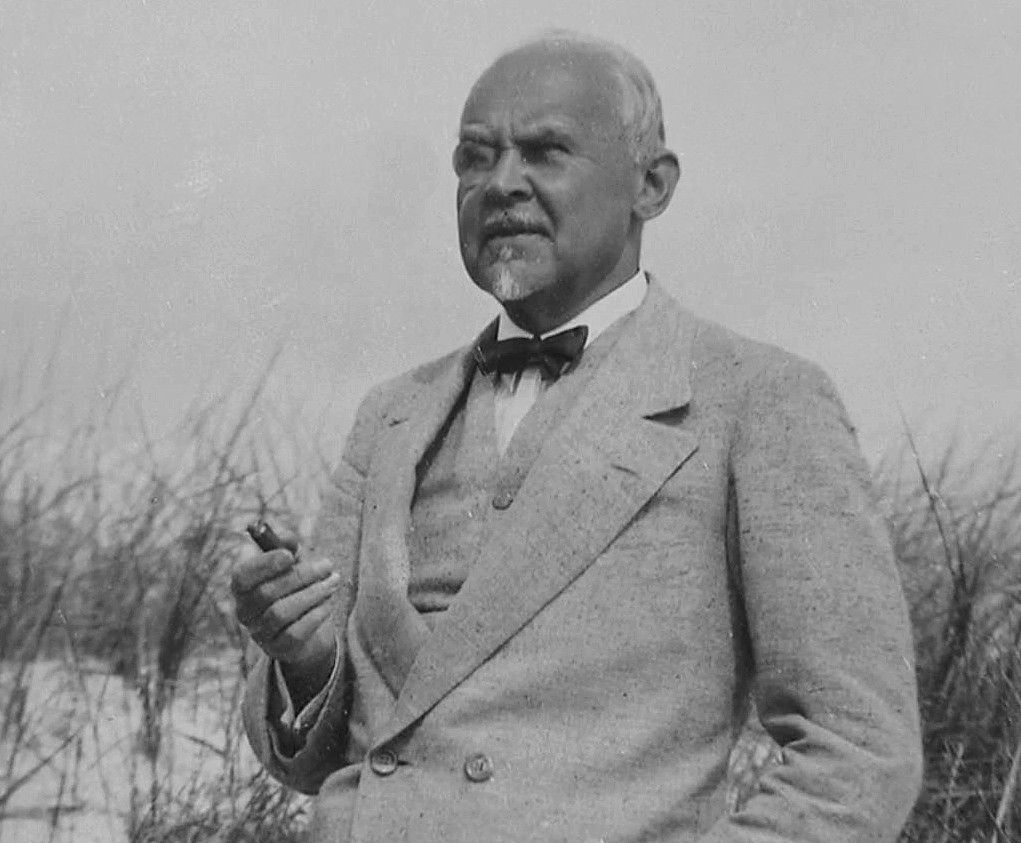
- Alfred Grenander in 1929
- Born: Alfred Frederik Elias Grenander; 26 June 1863; Skövde, Västra Götaland County, Sweden
- Died: 14 March 1931 (aged 67); Berlin
- Burial place: Skanör med Falsterbo, Sweden
- Occupation: architect
- Known for: Berlin U-Bahn infrastructure

Alfred Frederik Elias Grenander (26 June 1863 – 14 March 1931) was a Swedish architect, who became one of the most prominent engineers during the first building period of the Berlin U-Bahn network in the early twentieth century.

== Biography ==
Grenander was born at Skövde in Västra Götaland County, Sweden. He was raised in Stockholm and began studying at the Swedish Royal Institute of Technology in 1881. He changed to the Königliche Technische Hochschule in Charlottenburg (now Technische Universität Berlin) in 1885. After his final degree in 1890 he became a site engineer at the construction of the new Reichstag building under the direction of Paul Wallot and continued his career in the architectural office of Alfred Messel.

In 1896 Grenander set up his own business and worked as a designer of the Hochbahngesellschaft, an affiliate of Siemens & Halske established in 1897 to build the first U-Bahn elevated railway of Berlin, opened in 1902. Up to 1931, he constructed about 70 U-Bahn stations, many of which have landmark status today. While the first stations were designed in an Art Nouveau (Jugendstil) or Neoclassical style, he later preferred a Modern architecture.

Alfred Grenander died in Berlin; he was buried in Skanör med Falsterbo, Sweden. In 2009, the public area in front of Krumme Lanke station in Berlin-Zehlendorf was named in his honour.

== Berlin U-Bahn Stations designed by Grenander ==
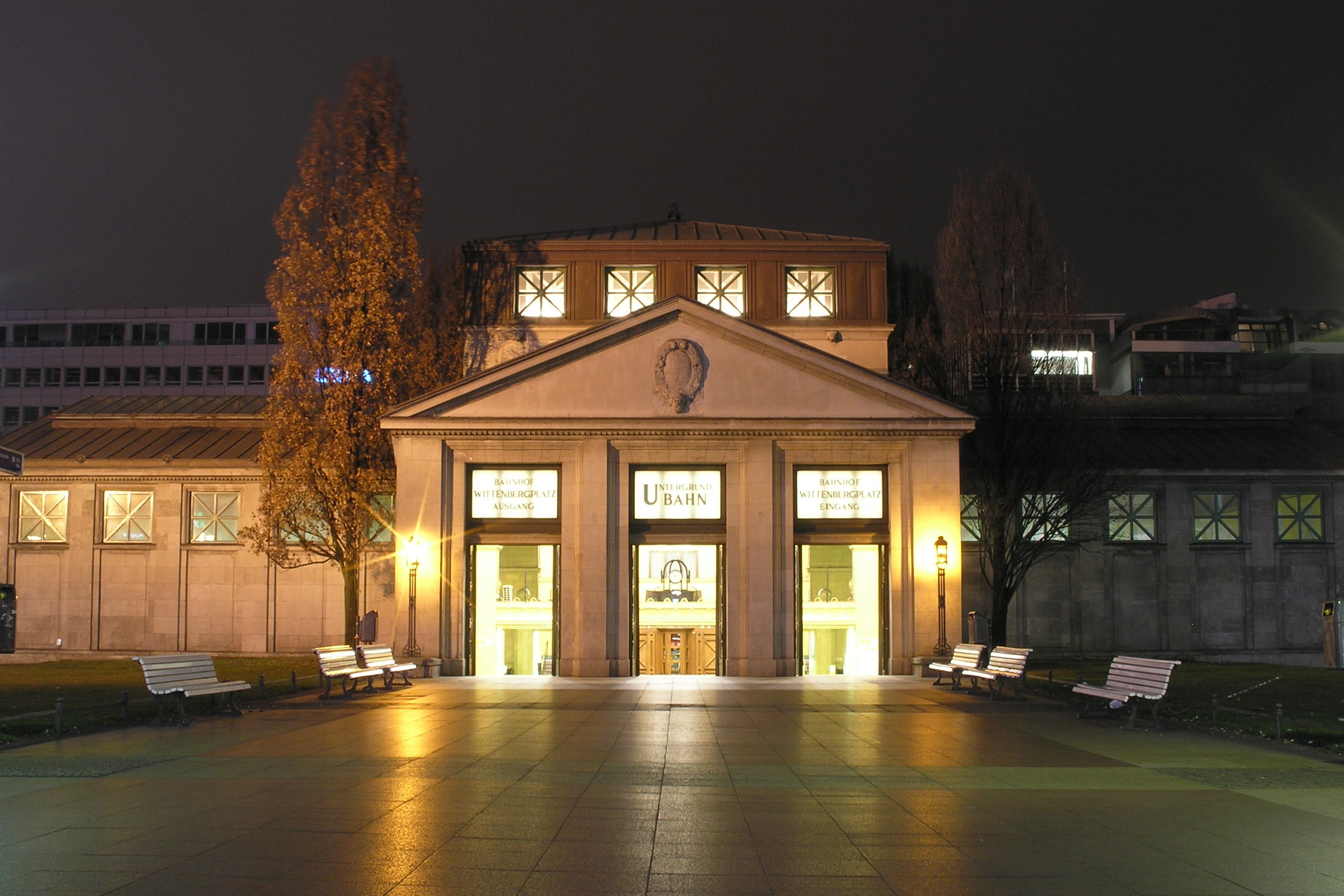
Wittenbergplatz station

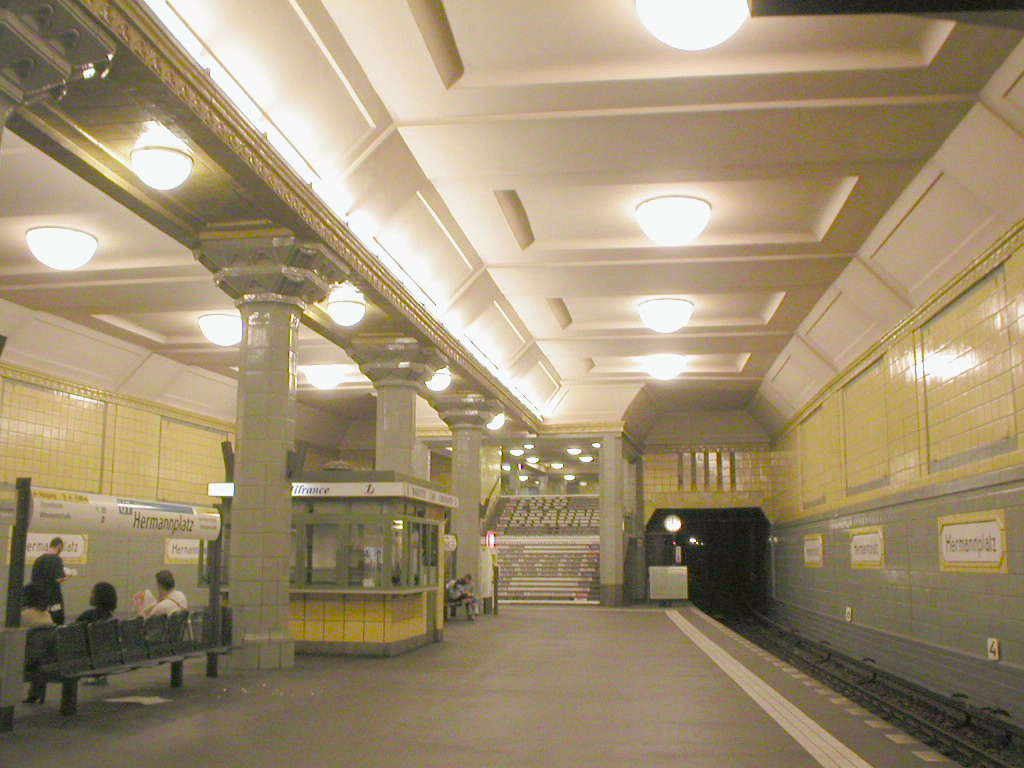
Hermannplatz station, platform

- 1902: Ernst-Reuter-Platz (Knie)
- 1906: Deutsche Oper (Bismarckstraße), Wilhelmplatz – demolished
- 1907: Potsdamer Platz (Leipziger Platz)
- 1908: Sophie-Charlotte-Platz, Kaiserdamm, Theodor-Heuss-Platz (Reichskanzlerplatz); Mohrenstraße, (Kaiserhof), Stadtmitte (Friedrichstraße), Hausvogteiplatz, Spittelmarkt
- 1912: Wittenbergplatz – entrance hall
- 1913: Märkisches Museum (Inselbrücke), Klosterstraße, Alexanderplatz – U2; Rosa-Luxemburg-Platz (Schönhauser Tor), Senefelderplatz, Eberswalder Straße (Danziger Straße), Schönhauser Allee (Nordring); Uhlandstraße
- 1922: Neu-Westend
- 1924: Mehringdamm (Belle-Alliance-Straße), Gneisenaustraße, Südstern (Hasenheide)
- 1926: Hermannplatz – U7, Rathaus Neukölln, Karl-Marx-Straße; Platz der Luftbrücke (Kreuzberg)
- 1927: Boddinstraße, Hermannplatz – U6, Schönleinstraße; Paradestraße (Flughafen)
- 1928: Kottbusser Tor (reconstruction), Heinrich-Heine-Straße (Neanderstraße)
- 1929: Leinestraße; Onkel Toms Hütte, Krumme Lanke; Tempelhof; Olympia-Stadion (Stadion) – reconstruction, Ruhleben
- 1930: Jannowitzbrücke, Alexanderplatz – U8, U5, Weinmeisterstraße, Rosenthaler Platz, Gesundbrunnen; Schillingstraße, Strausberger Platz, Weberwiese (Memeler Straße), Frankfurter Tor (Petersburger Straße), Samariterstraße, Frankfurter Allee, Magdalenenstraße, Lichtenberg, Friedrichsfelde
