= Berlin Fortress =

- Festung Berlin
- Near Berlin in Germany

Site history
- Built: 1650
- In use: 1650–1740
- Fate: Demolished

The Berlin Fortress (German "Festung Berlin") was the fortification of the historic city of Berlin. Construction started in 1650. The ramparts, walls, moats and glacis of the 17th-century bastion fort ran around the historic city limits. The demolition of its ramparts began in 1740.

== History ==
Berlin was an important market place on the main east-west route (today Bundesstraße 1). However, it had no real fortifications, unlike Spandau in the west (Spandau Citadel) and Köpenick in the east (Köpenick Palace). Although Berlin was not the site of any battles during the Thirty Years' War (1618–1648) it suffered heavily from the Swedish occupation; by the end of the war in 1631, a third of the buildings had been demolished and half the population had fled or died.

Frederick William I, Elector of Brandenburg ordered the engineer architect Johann Gregor Memhardt to make plans for a fortification for the town. These began in 1650 following the contemporary fortification model of bastion forts in northern Italy. Large ramparts were erected and the space between was filled with water.

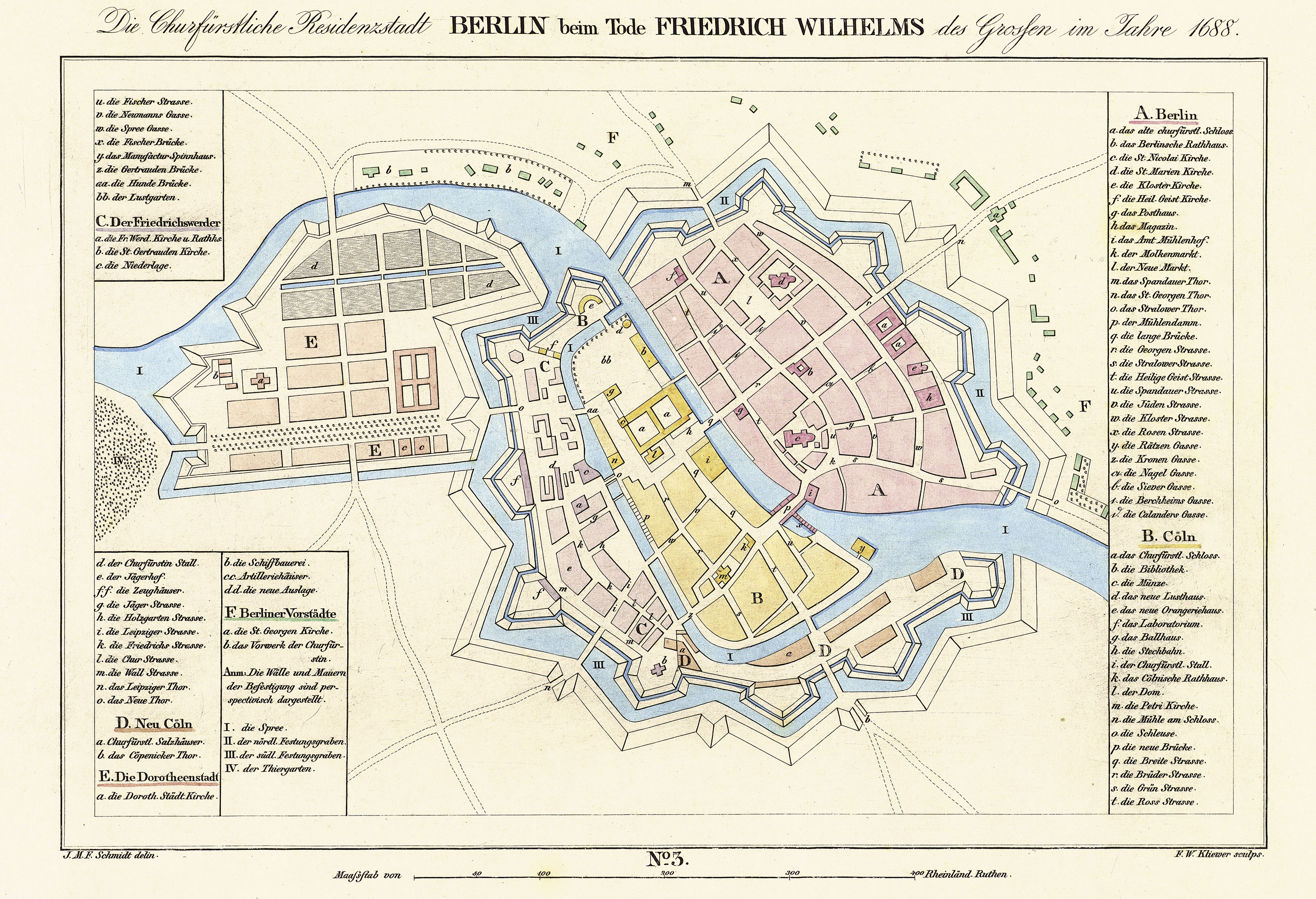
City map showing the town as of 1688

The construction of the parts east of the river was finished between 1658 and 1662. There were more problems with the western parts due to the swamps in the area and accordingly these were not finished until 1683. However, the ramparts on that side never reached their intended height.

While the Friedrichswerder, founded in 1662 and named after the Elector, was included in the fortifications, later city expansions were outside. Clearly visible on the city map from 1688 is the western peninsula of Dorotheenstadt (marked with E), an urban development project of the Elector's wife, Sophie Dorothea, which is barely fortified, except on the river bank, and separated from southern wasteland only by an artificial moat. The newly planted linden tree avenue, known as Unter den Linden, also runs through it.

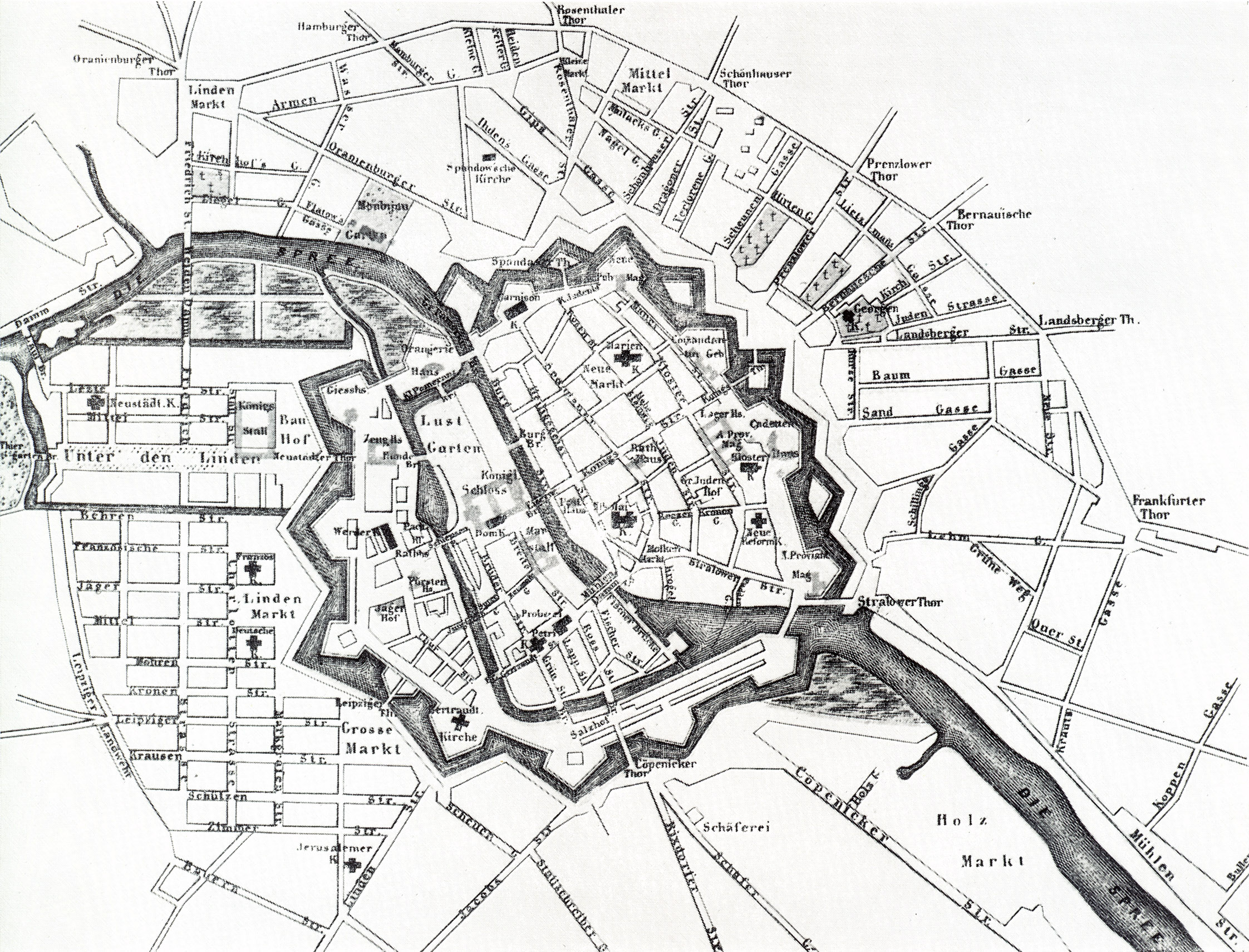
A map of Berlin in 1710: The new Friedrichstadt appears in the lower left.

The Elector died in 1688 and was succeeded by his son Frederick I. The new ruler expanded the city again and from 1691 created a third expansion, Friedrichstadt, south of Dorotheenstadt and west of Friedrichswerder (the latter marked C and D on the map of 1688), also built outside of the fortifications. Suburbs also developed in the north and east, more rampantly than planned. Gradually, a significant part of the rapidly growing city was located outside the fortifications, while these no longer faced the outside, but were themselves in the middle of the city and obstructed traffic.

In the following years the ramparts deteriorated to such an extent that Frederick William I of Prussia decided to abandon them in 1734. In their place the Berlin Customs Wall was erected, a project that continued until 1737. In 1740 work began to demolish the walls of the fortress, but it was not until the end of the 19th century that all of the ramparts had been levelled.

Today nothing remains apart from an echo of its path as shown by the zig-zag routes taken by some streets in the city center. For instance, the triangular shape of Hausvogteiplatz, a small square, corresponds to an earlier bastion of the fortifications. The railway tracks of Berlin Stadtbahn along the eastern and northern sections of Mitte between the stations Hackescher Markt and Jannowitzbrücke are built where the fortress had been.

== Fortifications ==
The Berlin Fortress had five city gates and 13 bastions.

- Leipzig Gate (Leipziger Tor)
- Köpenick Gate (Köpenicker Tor)
- Mills Gate (Mühlentor)
- Georges Gate (Georgentor),
  originally named after the Hospital Saint-Georges it was renamed to King's Gate (Königstor) in 1701
- Spandau Gate (Spandauer Tor)
- New Town Gate (Neustädtisches Tor)
  added in direction of the western planned town Dorotheenstadt which was supposed to be fortified as well but these plans were never realized.
- I. Leib-Garde-Bollwerk (Gießhaus-Bastion)
- II. „Wittgensteinsches“ Bollwerk
- III. „Sparr“-Bollwerk (Jäger-Bastion)
- IV. Gertrauden-Bollwerk (Spittel-Bastion)
- V. „Goltzsches“ Bollwerk (Salz-Bastion)
- VI. „Rillenfortsches“ Bollwerk (Heubinder-Bastion)
- VII. Bollwerk „im Sumpf“ (Köpenicker Bastion)
- VIII. Stralauer Bollwerk
- IX. Kloster-Bollwerk (Hetzgarten-Bastion)
- X. „Siebenburgisches“ Bollwerk (Marien-Bastion, Kommandanten-Bastion
- XI. Dragoner-Bastion
- XII. „Uffelnsches“ Bollwerk (Spandauer Bastion)
- XIII. Lustgarten-Bollwerk

== Literature ==
- Peter Feist: Als Berlin eine Festung war …, 1658–1746. In: Der historische Ort Nr. 27. 2. Auflage. Kai Homilius Verlag, Berlin 2006, ISBN 3-931121-26-7 (26 Seiten im Taschenkalender-Format).
