= Olympia-Stadion station (Berlin U-Bahn) =

Berlin U-Bahn station

Olympia-Stadion
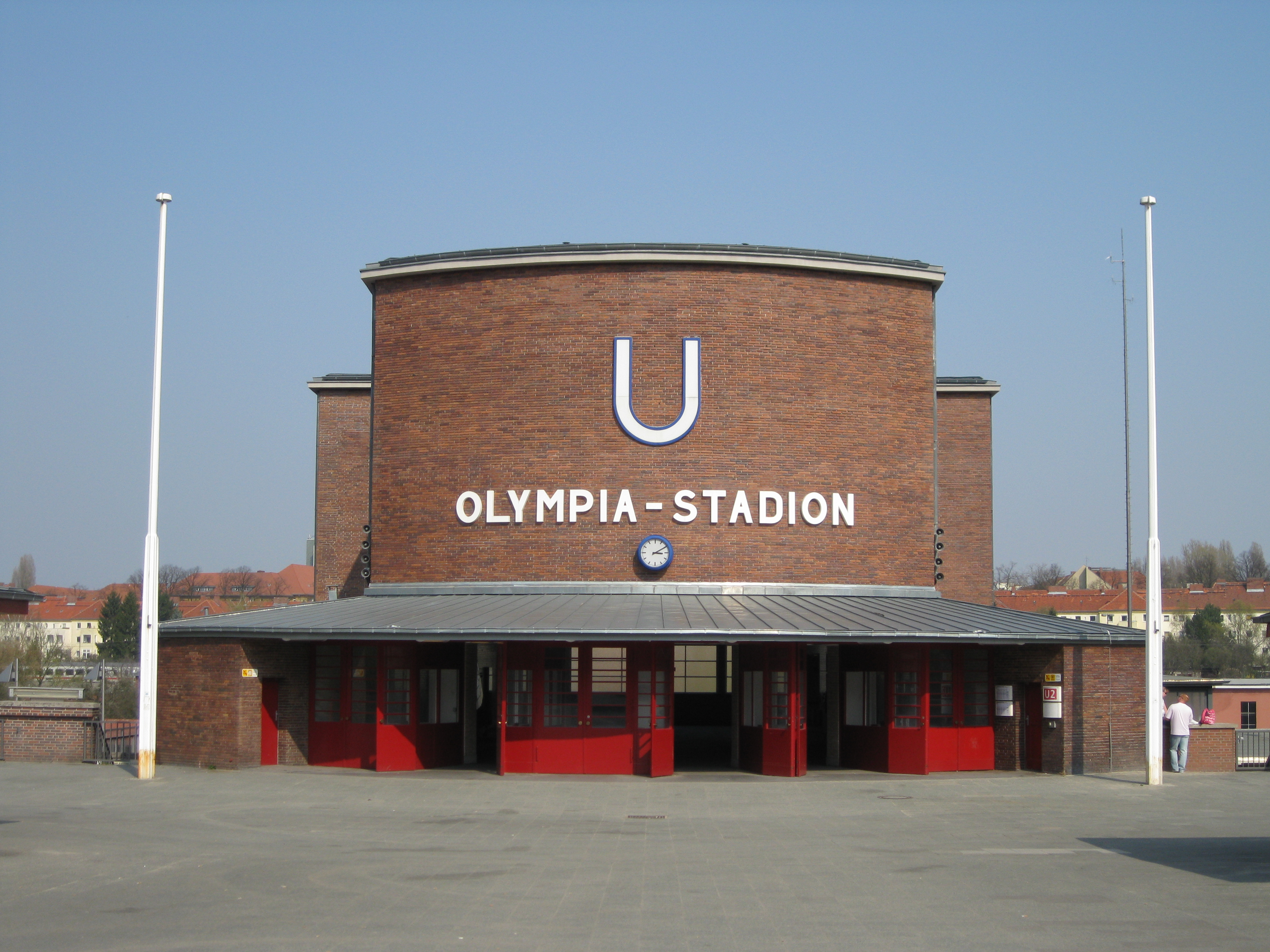
- 2009

General information
- Location: Olympiastadion; Westend, Berlin; Germany
- Coordinates: 52°31′02″N 13°15′00″E
- Owner: Berliner Verkehrsbetriebe
- Operator: Berliner Verkehrsbetriebe
- Platforms: 1 island platform; 1 side platform
- Tracks: 4

Construction
- Structure type: At-grade
- Cycle facilities: No
- Accessible: Yes

Other information
- Fare zone: : Berlin B/5656

History
- Opened: 8 June 1913; 113 years ago

Services
Preceding station	Berlin U-Bahn	Following station
Ruhleben Terminus	U2	Neu-Westend towards Pankow
Location
- Location within Berlin

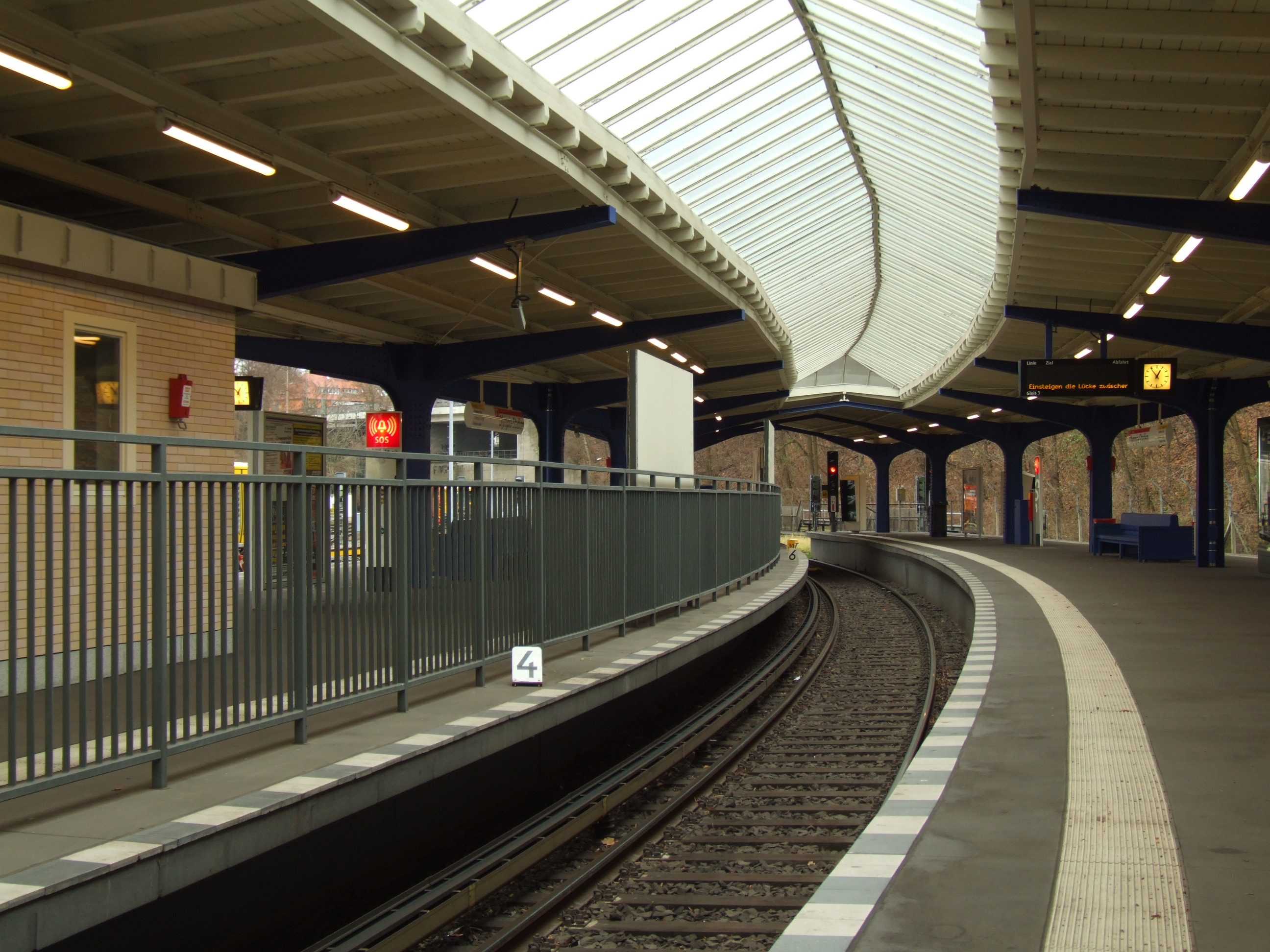
The station in 2011

Olympia-Stadion is a Berlin U-Bahn station on line U2, in the Westend district. It serves Berlin's Olympic Stadium, where football matches and other events are regularly held. The station is located around 500 m (1,600 ft) from the similarly named S-Bahn station, Olympiastadion, whose name – without hyphen – more closely reflects that of the Olympic Stadium.

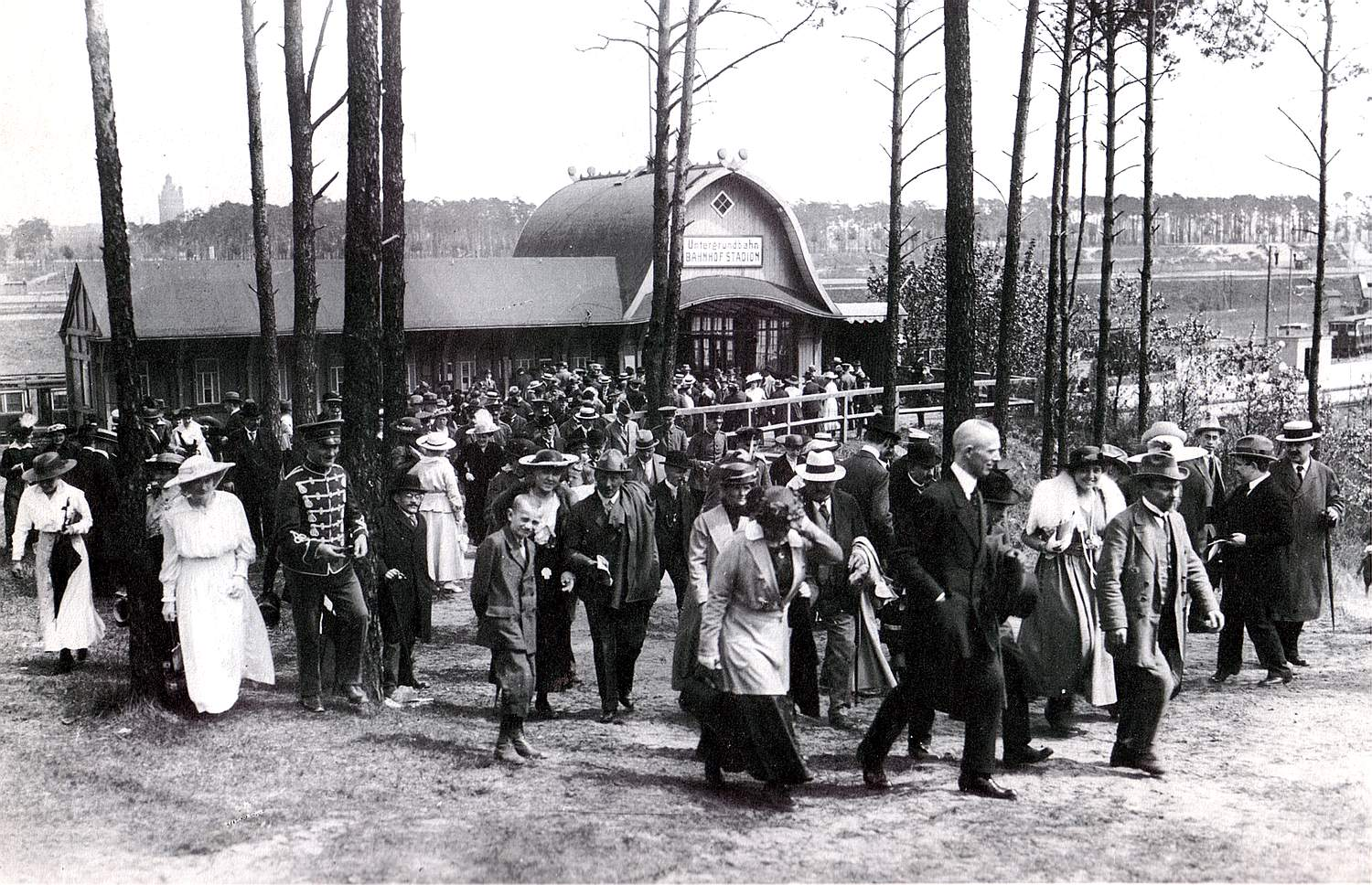
Bahnhof Stadion in 1913

== History ==
The Stadion station was opened on 8 June 1913, together with the Deutsches Stadion, the predecessor of the Olympic Stadium. Due to World War I, the 1916 Summer Olympics, for which the building of the stadium was intended, were cancelled and regular train service at the Stadion station was not available until 1922. Subsequent to Berlin's successful application for the 1936 Summer Olympics, the renowned U-Bahn architect Alfred Grenander redesigned the building and the station was named Reichssportfeld.

On 15 February 1944, it was directly hit by the air raids.

From 1950 on, the station was called Olympia-Stadion; between 1992 and 1999, it bore the name Olympia-Stadion (Ost). The building was extensively restored in preparation of the 2006 FIFA World Cup and received blue pillars and benches, according to the colours of the local Hertha BSC Berlin football club.
