= Spittelmarkt station =

Station of the Berlin U-Bahn

Spittelmarkt
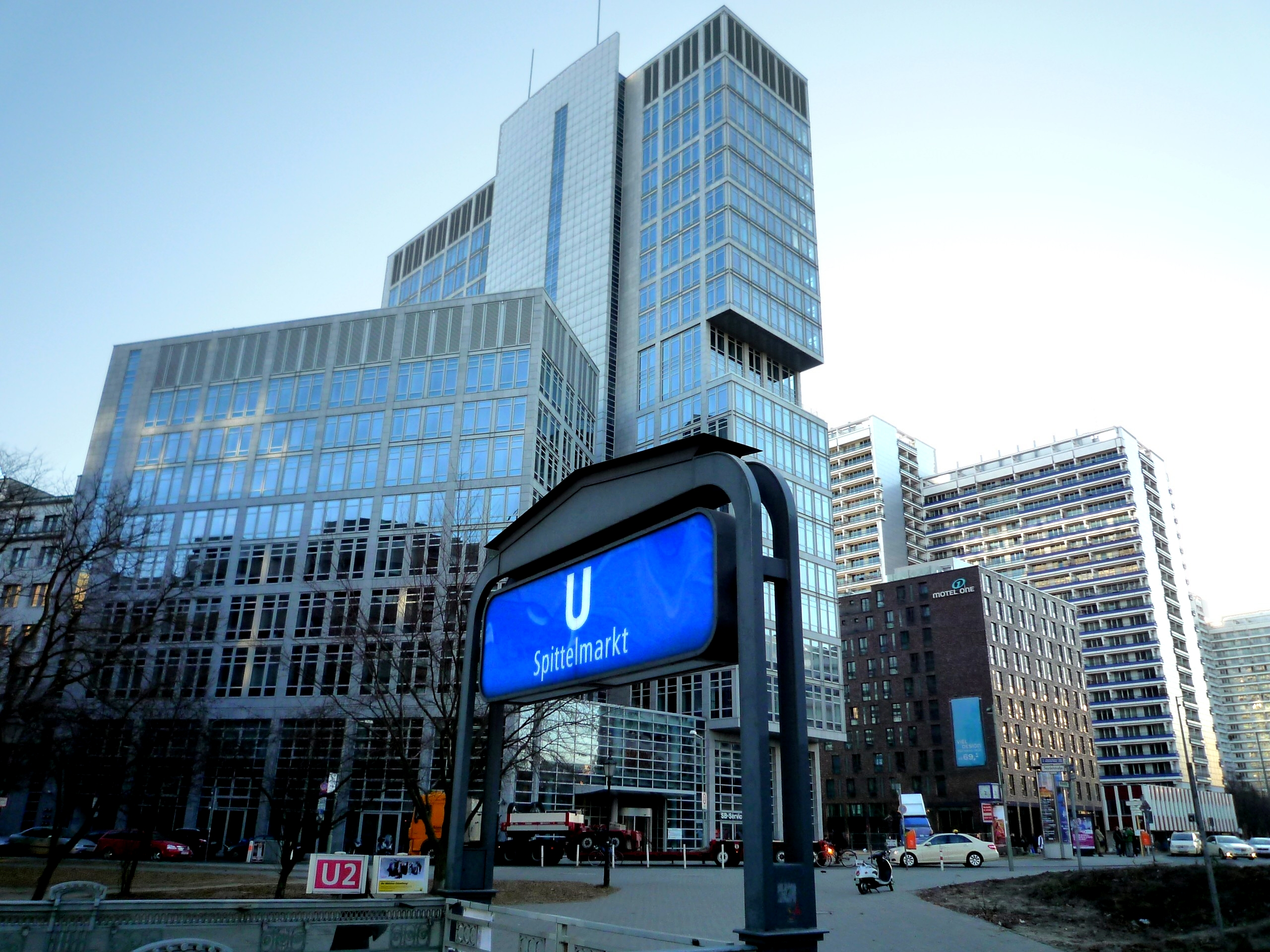
- Spittelmarkt in 2011

General information
- Location: Spittelmarkt; Mitte, Berlin; Germany
- Coordinates: 52°30′40″N 13°24′13″E
- Owner: Berliner Verkehrsbetriebe
- Operator: Berliner Verkehrsbetriebe
- Platforms: 1 island platform
- Tracks: 2
- Connections: : 200, 248, 265, N2, N42

Construction
- Structure type: Underground
- Cycle facilities: Yes (Call a Bike, bicycle parking)
- Accessible: Yes

Other information
- Fare zone: : Berlin A/5555

History
- Opened: 1 October 1908; 118 years ago

Services
Preceding station	Berlin U-Bahn	Following station
Hausvogteiplatz towards Ruhleben	U2	Märkisches Museum towards Pankow
Route map
Location
- Location within Berlin Location within Germany Location within Europe

Spittelmarkt is a Berlin U-Bahn station on line U2, located in Mitte at the eastern end of Leipziger Straße. Opened on 1 October 1908 as the end of a new section extending from Potsdamer Platz, the underground station has a single island platform.

== History ==
The station was opened on 1 October 1908, and was then the terminus of Berlin's second U-Bahn line, connecting it with Potsdamer Platz on the initial Stammstrecke route. It is named after the Spittelmarkt square, former site of the Saint Gertrude hospital established about 1400. The name Spittelmarkt is formed from a contraction of "hospital" (as also in Spitalfields, London) and the German word for "market". The station, designed by Alfred Grenander, was lavishly erected right beneath the banks of the Spree river, with daylight windows above the water's surface.

Spittelmarkt became a through station with the extension of the line to Alexanderplatz on 1 July 1913. In 1940 the windows were walled up as an air raid precaution. There was a direct bomb hit on the platform area on 3 February 1945. It was only by chance that the northern station wall was not destroyed. Since this wall is also the sea wall of the Spree, the inner-city tunnel system would have been flooded and would have disrupted the underground traffic in the long term.

In 1990, a major accident occurred when a train crashed into another stopped train. Fourteen people were injured. Spilled oil had covered the tracks, preventing the train from braking.

The station did not reopen until extensive reconstruction works started in 2003.

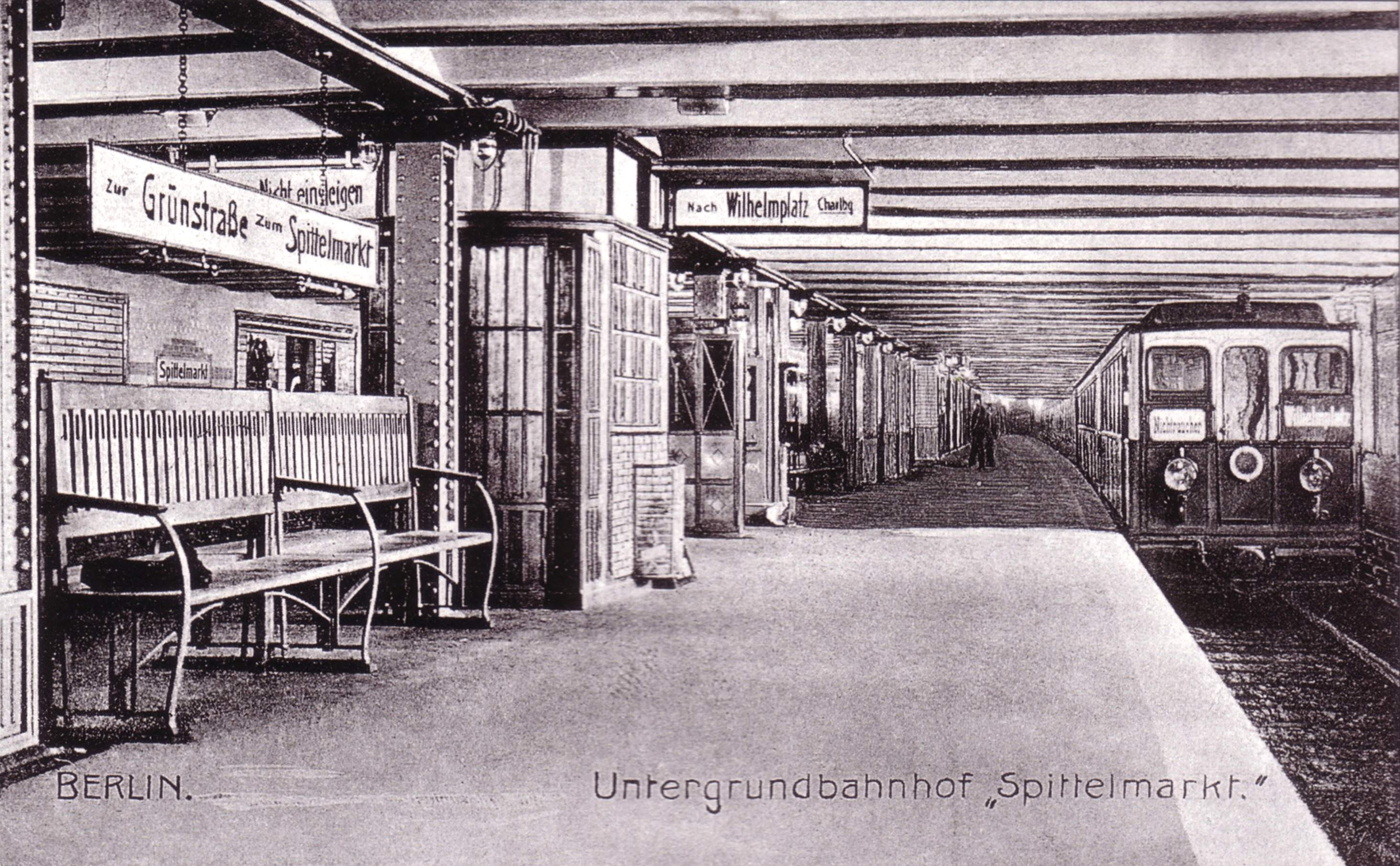
The station in 1908, with a Nichtraucher (non-smoker) train departing to Wilhelmplatz

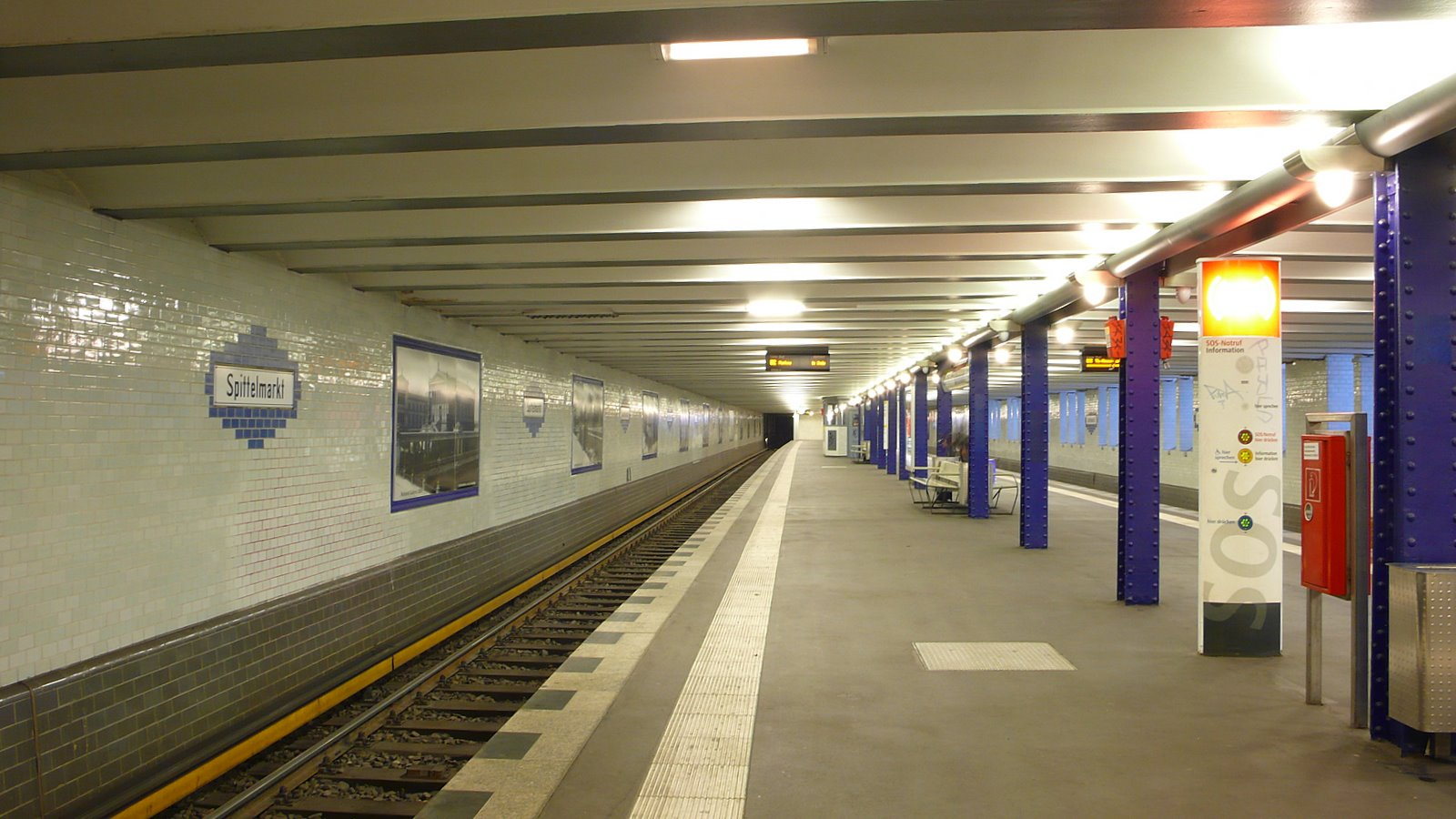
Interior view, 2011
