= Ruhleben station =

Berlin U-Bahn station

Ruhleben
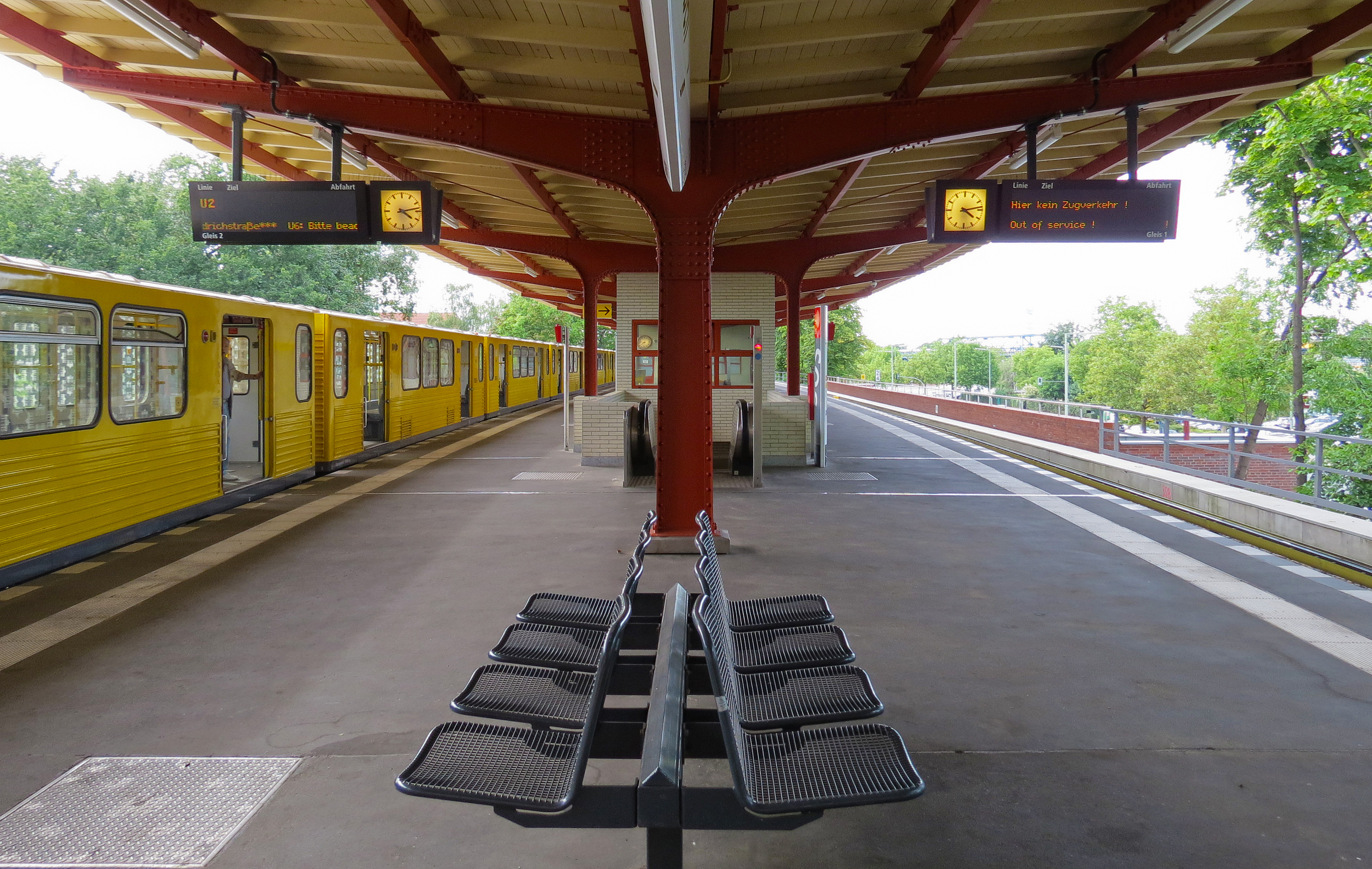
- Platform view of Ruhleben

General information
- Location: Charlottenburger Chausee/Stendelweg; Westend, Berlin; Germany
- Coordinates: 52°31′32″N 13°14′29″E
- Owner: Berliner Verkehrsbetriebe
- Operator: Berliner Verkehrsbetriebe
- Platforms: 1 island platform
- Tracks: 2
- Connections: : 130, 131, X37, N2; : M45

Construction
- Structure type: Elevated
- Cycle facilities: Yes
- Accessible: Yes

Other information
- Fare zone: : Berlin B/5656

History
- Opened: 22 December 1929; 96 years ago

Services
Preceding station	Berlin U-Bahn	Following station
Terminus	U2	Olympia-Stadion towards Pankow
Location
- Location within Berlin

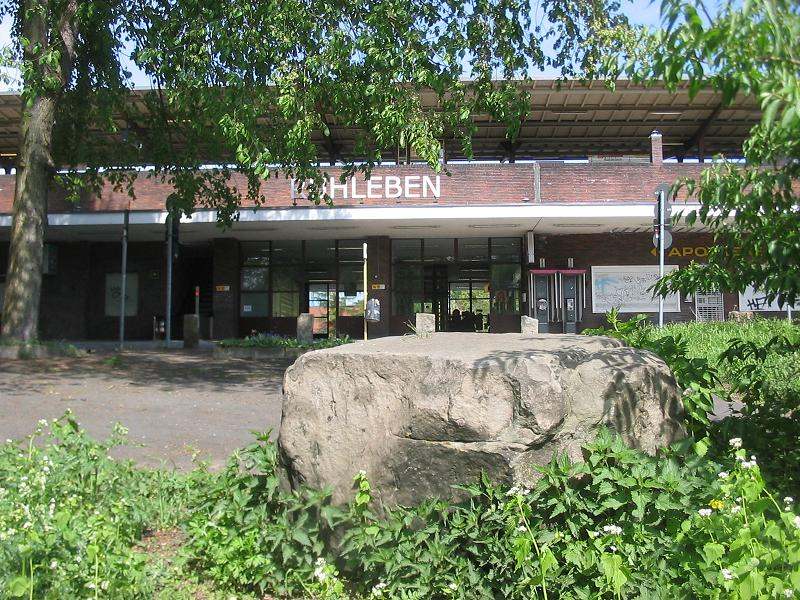
Glacial erratic from the Murellenschlucht located in front of the station.

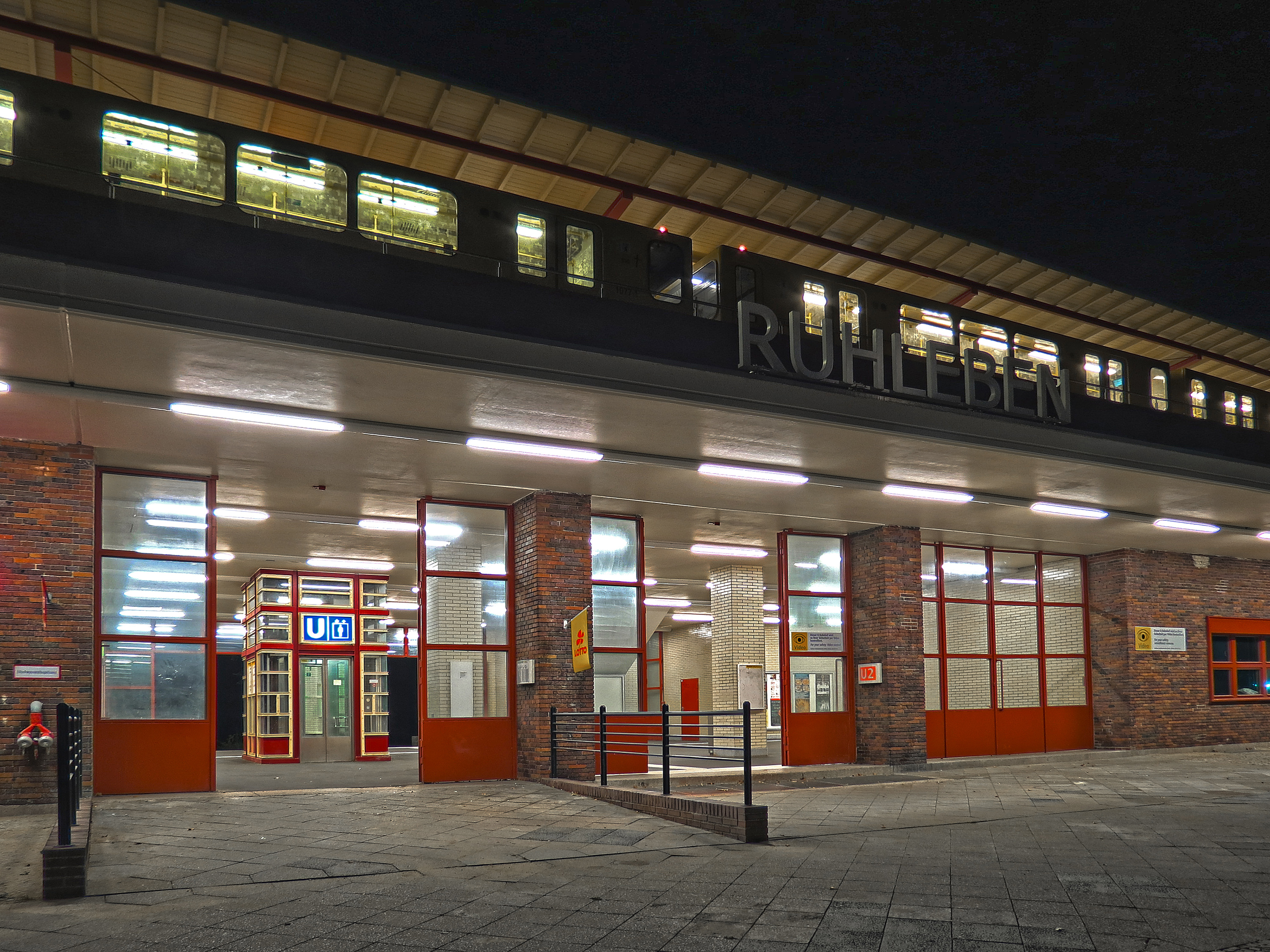
Northern entrance

Ruhleben is a Berlin U-Bahn station, the western terminus of line U2. Named after the adjacent Ruhleben neighbourhood, it is located in the Westend district close to the border with Spandau.

The station, with an elevated platform and subjacent entrance hall, was designed by Alfred Grenander, and inaugurated with the westernmost section of the present U2 on 22 December 1929. The tracks end immediately behind the platform without any reversing facility. Plans to extend the U2 toward Spandau were cancelled during the Great Depression and never carried out; they became obsolete after the construction of the U7 to Rathaus Spandau in 1984 and the re-opening of the Spandau Suburban Line of the Berlin S-Bahn in 1998. In 2010/2011 the station was extensively renovated.
