= Neu-Westend station =

Berlin U-Bahn station

Neu-Westend
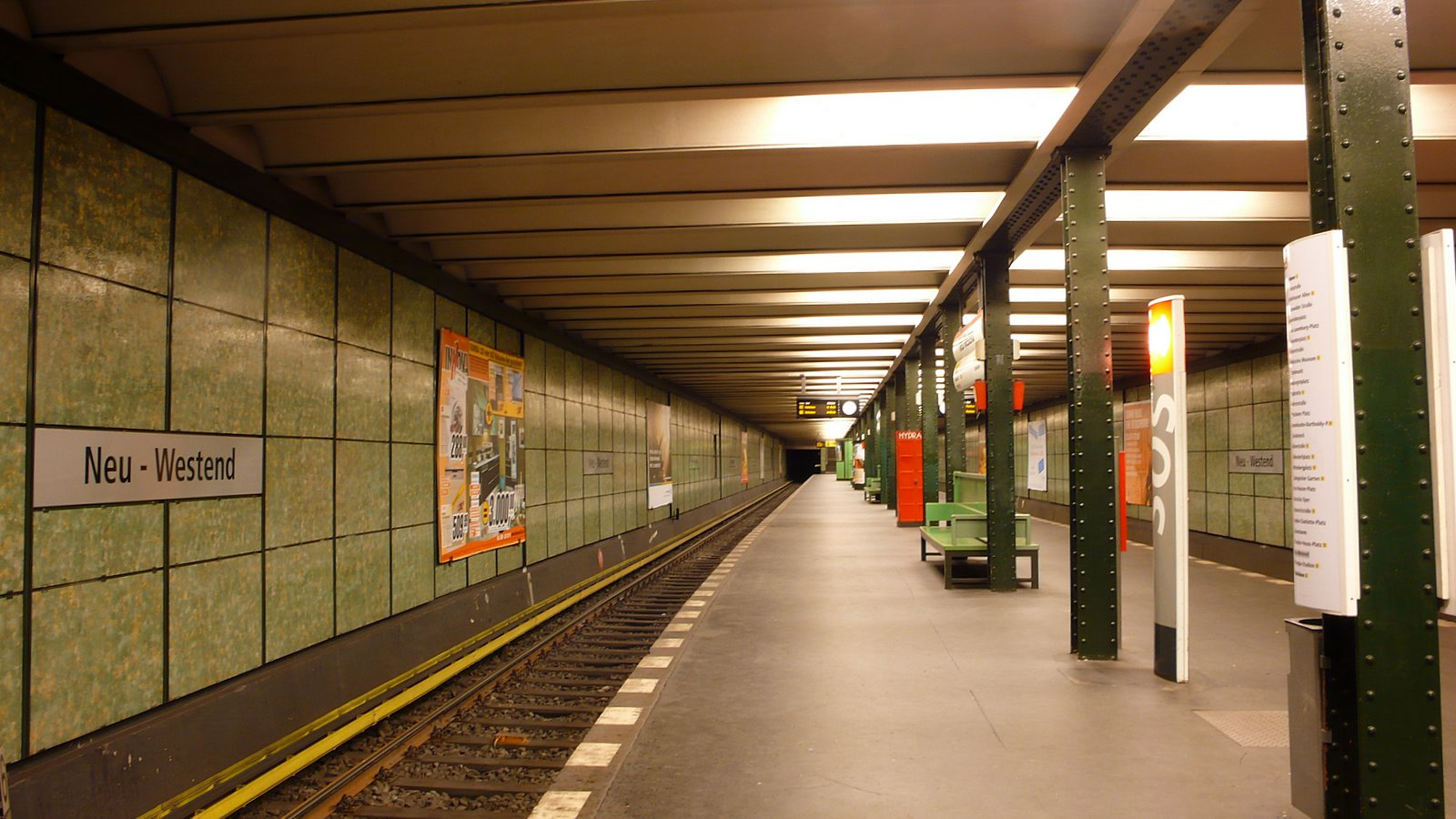
- Platform view of Neu-Westend

General information
- Location: Olympische Straße/Steubenplatz; Westend, Berlin; Germany
- Coordinates: 52°30′56″N 13°15′40″E
- Owner: Berliner Verkehrsbetriebe
- Operator: Berliner Verkehrsbetriebe
- Platforms: 1 island platform
- Tracks: 2
- Connections: : 104, 349, N2

Construction
- Structure type: Underground
- Cycle facilities: No
- Accessible: No

Other information
- Fare zone: : Berlin B/5656

History
- Opened: 20 May 1922; 104 years ago

Services
Preceding station	Berlin U-Bahn	Following station
Olympia-Stadion towards Ruhleben	U2	Theodor-Heuss-Platz towards Pankow
Location
- Location within Berlin

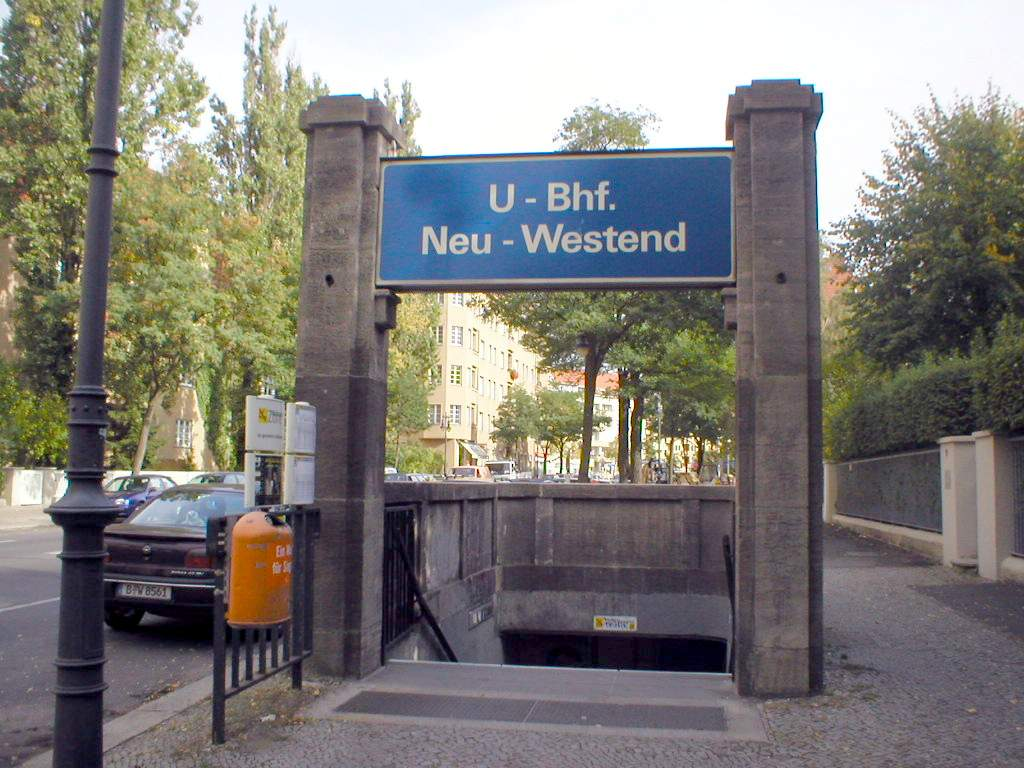
The west entrance to the station was added in 1935 to make it ready for the 1936 Summer Olympics.

Neu-Westend is a Berlin U-Bahn station on line U2. It opened in 1922 and was built by A. Grenander. In 1986 the station was renovated, but the original eastern entrance was kept.
