= Vinetastraße station =

Station of the Berlin U-Bahn

Coordinates: 52°33′34″N 13°24′48″E

Vinetastraße
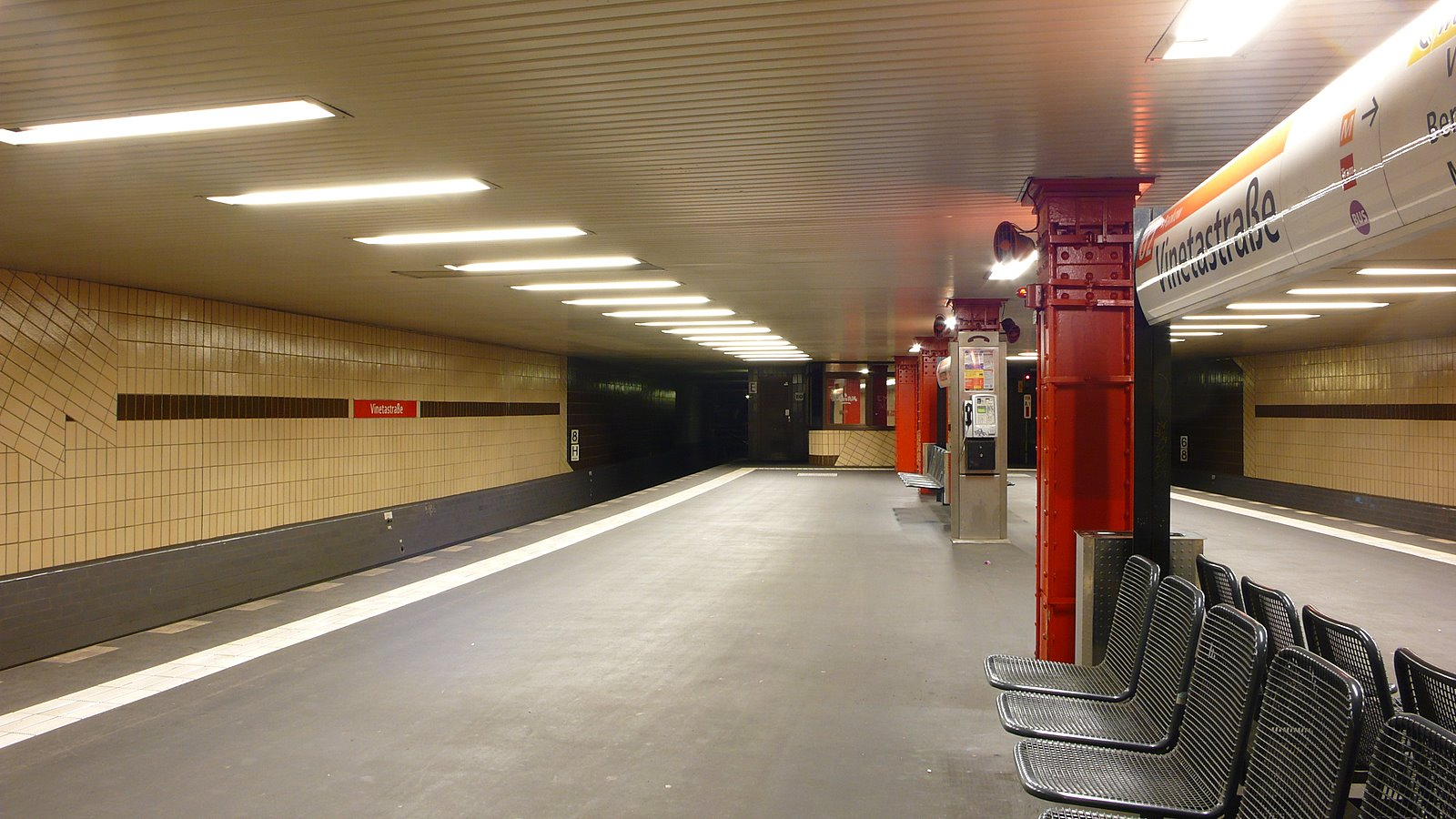

General information
- Location: Berliner Straße, Berlin; Pankow
- Owner: Berliner Verkehrsbetriebe
- Operator: Berliner Verkehrsbetriebe
- Platforms: 1 island platform
- Tracks: 2
- Train operators: Berliner Verkehrsbetriebe

Construction
- Structure type: Underground
- Parking: 6 metres(17 feet)
- Cycle facilities: Yes
- Accessible: Yes

Other information
- Fare zone: : Berlin B/5656

History
- Opened: 29 June 1930; 96 years ago

Services
Preceding station	Berlin U-Bahn	Following station
Schönhauser Allee towards Ruhleben	U2	Pankow Terminus
Route map
Location

Vinetastraße is a Berlin U-Bahn station in the Pankow district, located on the U2. It was opened in 1930, and for decades was the northern terminus of the U2, until the line was extended to the Pankow S-Bahn station in 2000.

== Etymology ==
This station is named after the legendary town of Vineta on the Baltic Sea.

== History ==
In 1913, the Hochbahngesellschaft, the private operating company of the Berlin Hoch- und Untergrundbahn, extended the section of the so-called "Centrum Line" from the Spittelmarkt on 1 July 1913 to Alexanderplatz and shortly thereafter to the Nordring station, today Schönhauser Allee, Although there was a connection to the tram in the direction of Pankow at Nordring station, the town of Pankow was not satisfied with it. Already in 1905, shortly after the opening of the elevated and underground railway, between Warsaw Bridge, Potsdamer Platz and Zoologischer Garten, it demanded a route to the center of Pankow. Nordring station itself was constructed above ground on a viaduct to compensate for the costs of the underground route at the Spittelmarkt and for the Spree tunnel near the Klosterstraße station. Passenger numbers at the intersection with the Ringbahn developed positively, so that in the timetable year 1929 the station was already with about nine million passengers in fifth place of the most visited Berlin underground stations. However, this became more and more of a problem, as the also above-ground sweeping system behind the Nordring station reached its capacity limit at a two-minute cycle. In addition, there was no possibility of weakening, i.e. extending and shortening the subways from eight to six cars or vice versa.

In connection with the 750th anniversary of the city of Berlin in 1987, numerous inner-city train stations were renovated. The terminus of the line A, Pankow (Vinetastraße), designed the collective to Stefan White, Rainer Binsch and Jörg Grote between 1985 and 1987, beige tiles and some oblique, red station signs now made the image of the terminus. In December 1987, the Ost-Berliner Verkehrsbetriebe had a bronze statue entitled The End of the Road by the artist Rolf Biebl set up.

But even the plans to extend the route of today's line U2 north, did not remain unaffected. Due to the fact that the small profile of the East Berlin subway still had no large workshop itself and no main workshop and the trains had to be brought to the railroad repair shop Schöneweide, the East Berlin city council examined the construction of a new workshop on the Granitzstraße Shunting yard Pankow. An extension to the train station Pankow itself could also be realized. The main reason for this was that the other East Berlin subway line E, today U5, was extended to Hönow and the capacities in the only subway workshop Friedrichsfelde were used. On 11 December 1986 the GDR Council of Ministers passed the decision to build the Granitzstraße workshop. The first construction works were scheduled for 1989. There should be a large parking facility for 144 cars, a car wash, a signal box as well as a service and repair hall. Because of the various reorganization on the occasion of the German reunification and thus also the traffic networks of both halves of the city, however, the subsequent construction work for the new workshop was suspended in the following period.

While the construction work was halted, German reunification also restored the unity of Berlin. This also made it necessary to connect the previously separate subway lines. However, the merger resulted in a problem: In addition to the parking facility behind the Pankow (Vinetastraße) station, the Ost-Berliner Verkehrsbetriebe had a majority of the trains between the stations Thälmannplatz, the terminus of line A, and the closed station Potsdamer Platz parked. However, this route was needed now, because there again trains should travel between West and East. Therefore, the city of Berlin resumed the construction work behind the station Pankow (Vinetastraße) to increase the capacity of the sweeper. The construction work was completed on 13 November 1993, the sweeping and parking now offered 112 cars place. On the same day, the construction work for the integration of the former line A could be completed, so now the new line U2 between Pankow (Vinetastraße) via Alexanderplatz, Potsdamer Platz, Nollendorfplatz, Zoologischer Garten drove to Ruhleben. On the same day, the BVG had the station Pankow (Vinetastraße) renamed. It was now called only "Vinetastraße".

After the political change, the discussion about gaps to be filled in the Berlin rapid transit network came up again, which also affected the gap between Vinetastrasse and Pankow station. The proposal to extend the line U2 until then, led to further discussions, since there was both a parallel S-Bahn connection between the stations Schönhauser Allee on Bornholm Street to Pankow and a tram connection. Nevertheless, the first construction work began on 29 March 1996. A new discussion sparked again around the point whether the construction of the workshop Granitzstraße should be realized or at least be prepared or whether these plans should be abandoned altogether. The state of Berlin and the BVG did not take part in their construction because the current workshop Grunewald can do all work without any capacity problems. Nevertheless, the BVG had the course set for a connection to a workshop. Extremely difficult soil conditions, the very high groundwater level and finds from a medieval settlement nevertheless delayed the work considerably.

Finally, on 16 September 2000, the gap between subway and subway could be opened. The costs amounted to 105 million marks (about 68 million euros) instead of the estimated 126 million marks (adjusted for purchasing power in today's currency: about 82 million euros). In the meantime, the name "Bahnhof Pankow" was intended, but the BVG opted for "Pankow". Since then, the Vinetastraße station is only a through station. Only in exceptional cases train services does end here.
