= U2 (Berlin U-Bahn) =

Rapid transit line in Germany

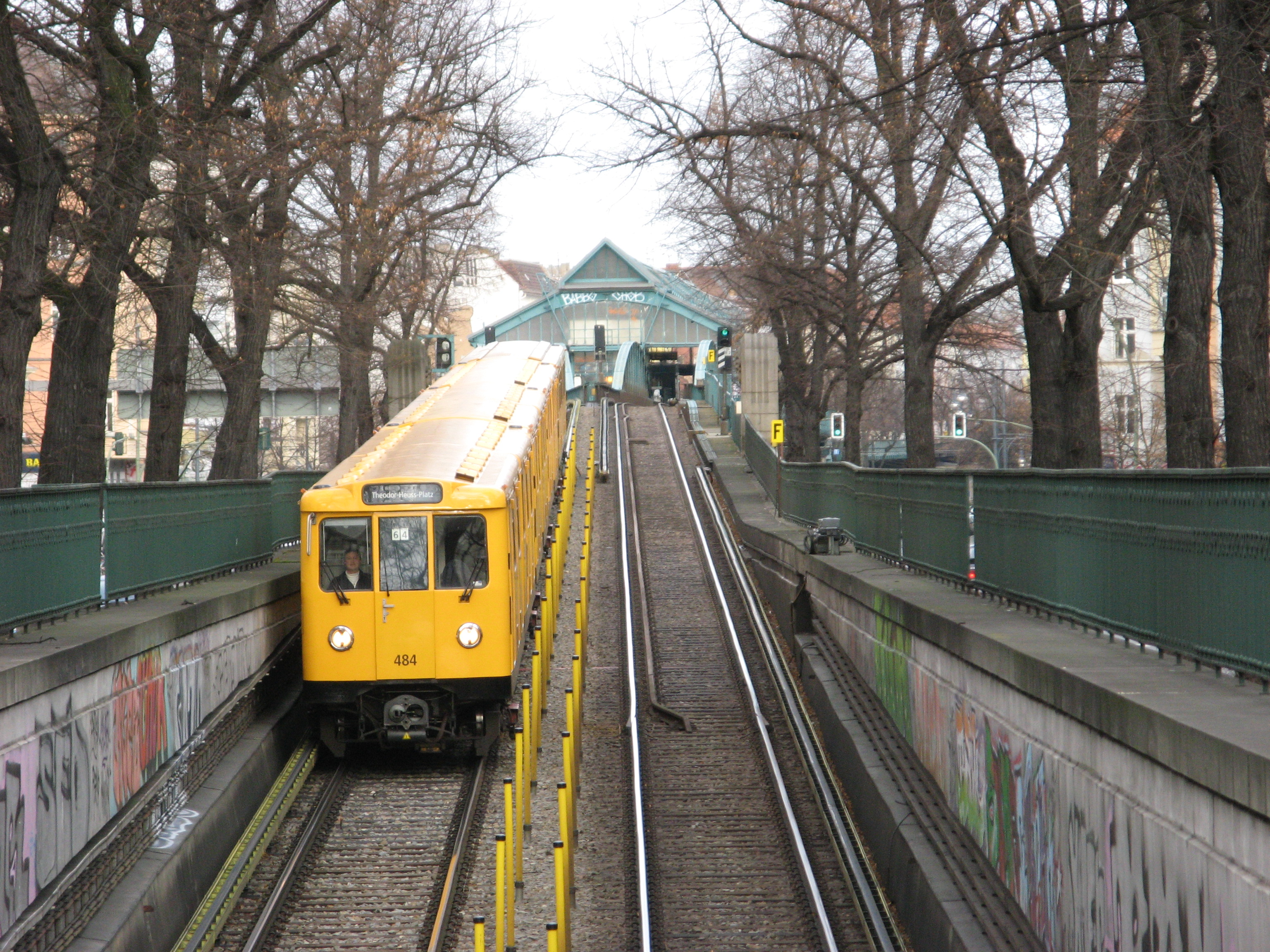
- A southbound U2 train entering the tunnel, near Eberswalder Straße

Overview
- Locale: Berlin
- Termini: Pankow; Ruhleben
- Stations: 29

Service
- Type: Rapid transit
- System: Berlin U-Bahn
- Operator: Berliner Verkehrsbetriebe
- Depot: Grunewald
- Rolling stock: A3; G; HK; IK; JK

History
- Opened: 11 March 1902; 124 years ago (Note: From Potsdamer Platz to Zoologischer Garten)
- Last extension: 16 September 2000 (Note: From Vinetastraße to Pankow)

Technical
- Line length: 20.7 km (12.9 mi)
- Track gauge: 1,435 mm (4 ft 8 1/2 in) standard gauge
- Loading gauge: Kleinprofil
- Electrification: 750 V DC third rail (top running)
Route map
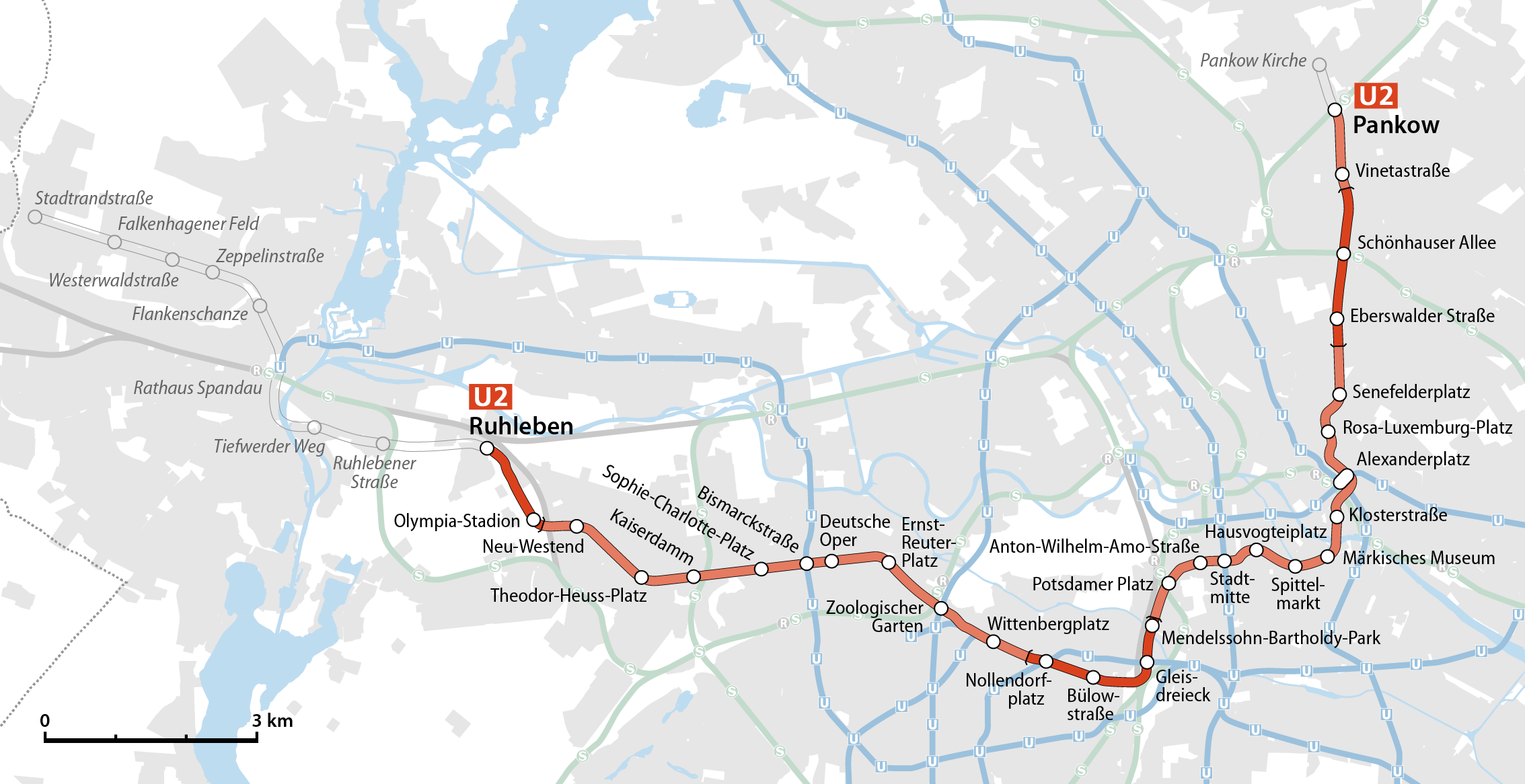

U2 is a line of the Berlin U-Bahn. The U2 line starts at Pankow S-Bahn station, runs through the eastern city centre (Alexanderplatz) to Potsdamer Platz, the western city centre (Wittenbergplatz, Zoologischer Garten, Theodor-Heuss Platz) and finally to the Ruhleben terminal station.

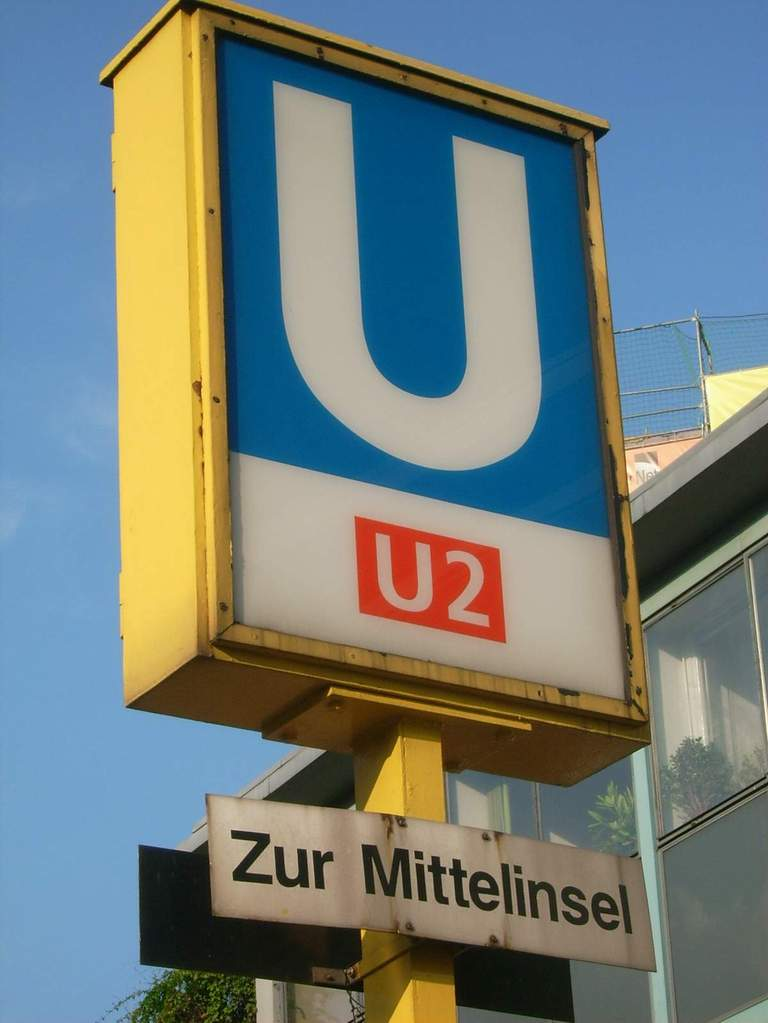
U2 sign at Ernst-Reuter Platz

The U2 has 29 stations and a length of 20.7 kilometers (12.9 mi). Together with the U1, U3, and U4 lines, it was part of the early Berlin U-Bahn network built before 1914. The line between Potsdamer Platz and Zoologischer Garten was the western section of the "stem line" (Stammstrecke), Berlin's first U-Bahn line opened in 1902.

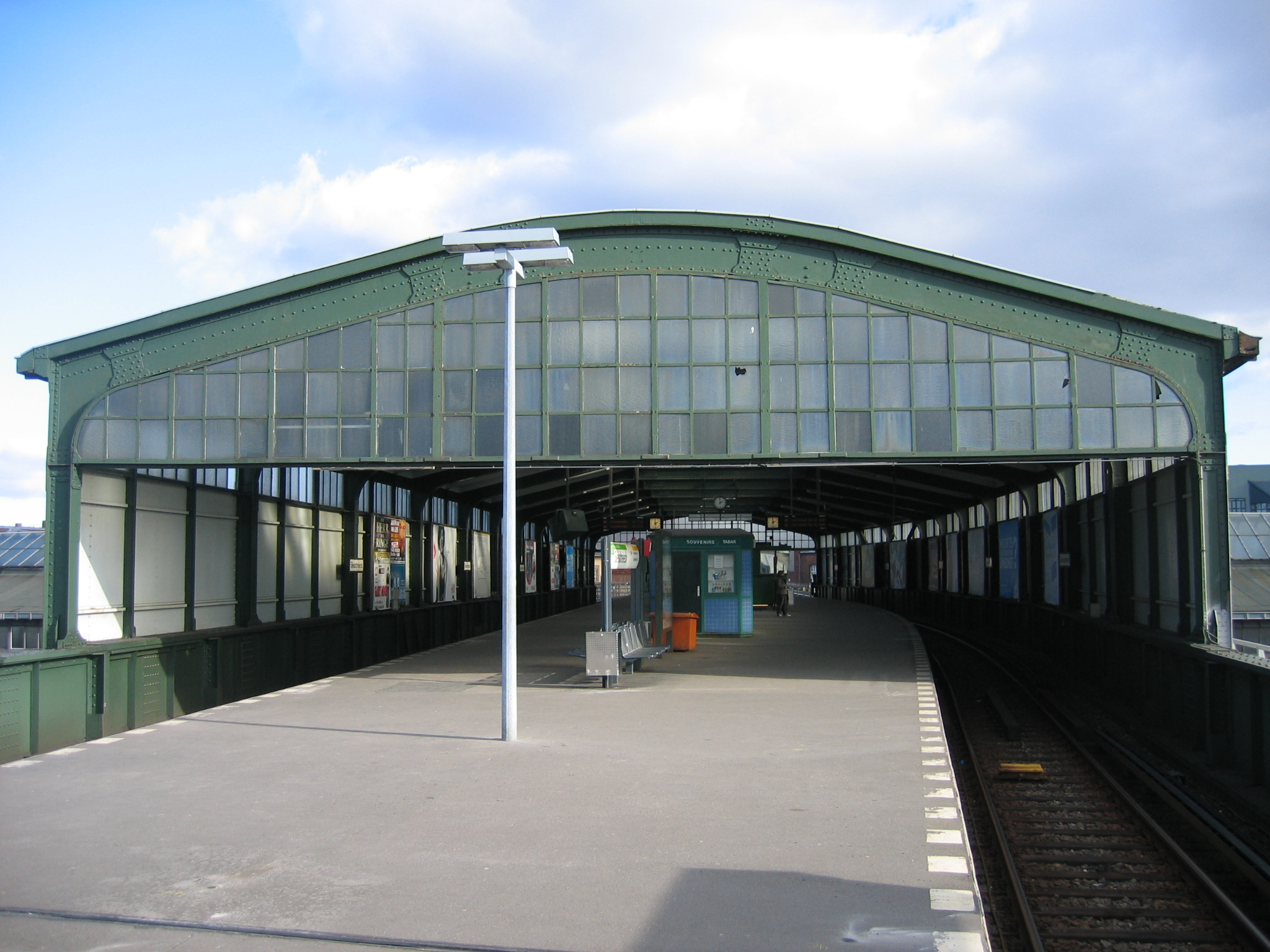
Gleisdreieck higher platform - today the U1 and the U3 stop here

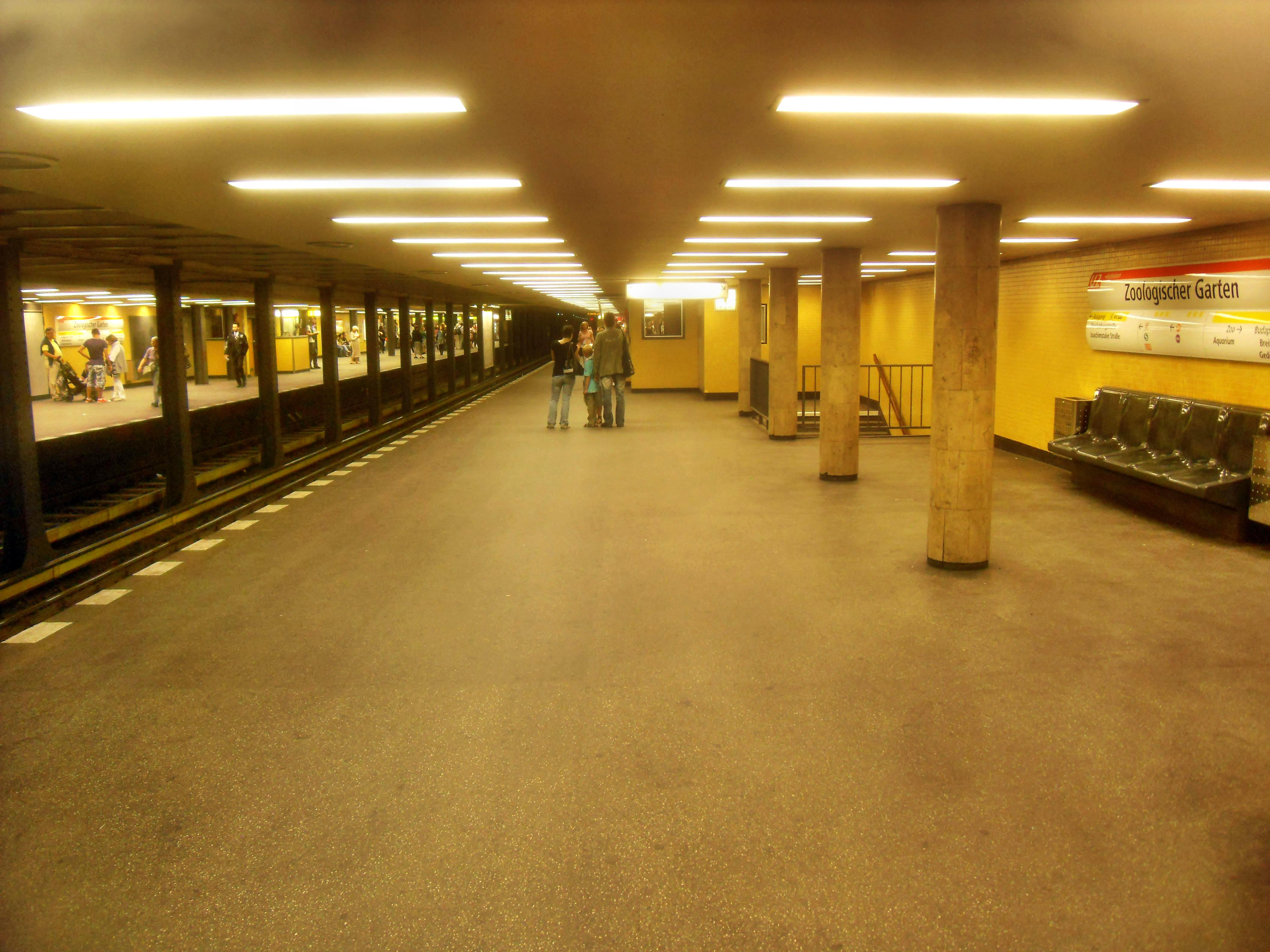
Zoologischer Garten station, looking towards Ruhleben

== Overview ==
The line starts to the west of central Berlin at Ruhleben and runs on an embankment between Rominter Allee and the railway to Spandau (also called the "Olympic" or "Grunewald" railway). On the bend approaching Olympischen Straße, the line descends into tunnel to run beneath that road from Neu-Westend to Wittenbergplatz. Subsequently, the U2 swings onto Reichsstrasse to Theodor-Heuss-Platz, where it runs in a curve to Kaiserdamm. Under Kaiserdamm, which becomes Bismarckstraße at Sophie Charlotte-Platz, the tunnel runs straight to Ernst-Reuter-Platz. Here again, it swings to the southeast, following the course of Hardenberger Straße towards Zoologischer Garten station. In the tunnel, it passes the foundations of the Kaiser Wilhelm Memorial Church on a tight arc and then follows Tauentzienstraße to Wittenbergplatz where the line emerges to an elevated section via a ramp east of the Kleiststraße/Courbierestraße intersection.

The elevated railway reaches its full height at Nollendorfplatz station where all four lines of the small-profile network meet. The underground part of the station has four tracks. The U2 continues above ground to the east of Bülowstraße. After that the U2 makes a curve over a long viaduct at the southernmost point of the line, passes through Gleisdreieck station and then runs straight across the Landwehr Canal and returns underground between Mendelssohn Bartholdy-Park and Potsdamer Platz stations.

While the elevated railway company intended to continue the line along Leipziger Straße, it was not permitted to build this route and instead it continues instead along Anton-Wilhelm-Amo-Straße, Markgrafenstraße and Niederwallstraße to the River Spree in Berlin Mitte. After passing Märkisches Museum station, it goes under the River Spree in a tunnel, and runs through Klosterstraße to Alexanderplatz station.

After leaving Alexanderplatz, the line turns under Rosa-Luxemburg-Straße and through Rosa-Luxemburg-Platz station. The line then runs north underneath Schönhauser Allee and through Senefelderplatz station. Before reaching Eberswalder Straße station, the line emerges from tunnel and on to an elevated viaduct through to Schönhauser Allee station, an interchange with the S-Bahn. From there the line runs beyond the former city limits and the elevated railway descends again into a tunnel to Vinetastraße before reaching the terminus at Pankow.

== Route numbering ==
Since the introduction of the schematic line network plans at the Berlin subway, at least parts of today's line U2 always had the colour red. When letters were introduced as a line name after the First World War, the small profile network received the letters "A" and "B". The inner city route, more important than the older route through Kreuzberg, became line A, as did the two western branches to Charlottenburg and Dahlem (today's U2 and U3 lines). The routes from Kurfürstendamm and Schöneberg through Kreuzberg to Warschauer Straße (today: U1 and U4) were given the letter "B" and the colour code green. To distinguish the branches in the western part of the line, the letters were supplemented by Roman numbers, the Charlottenburg route was thus the line A^{I}.

From 1966, the designation of the lines operated by the Berlin public transport companies (BVG West / BVG) in West Berlin was converted to Arabic numbers. Each line was now operated independently and without branching. The ("green") line 1 now ran from Ruhleben through Charlottenburg to Kreuzberg, while the previous A^{II} became the ("red") line 2 (Krumme Lanke – Gleisdreieck, from 1972 only to Wittenbergplatz). The severed eastern line section, used since 1949 by the BVG East / BVB, retained the "A" line designation unchanged, as well as the red colour code.

On 9 January 1984, the BVG also took over the S-Bahn lines in West Berlin previously managed by Deutsche Reichsbahn. The marking of the U-Bahn lines operated by the BVG changed again because the U-Bahn and S-Bahn lines were now operated in parallel. To better distinguish the two networks, the respective Arabic numbers, which had been used since 1966, were prefixed with the letter "U" to provide a line number. According to the model of public transport networks, which were used in various cities (Frankfurt, Shanghai, Munich, Beijing, Guangzhou) they were then designated as U1 to U9 and similarly the acquired S-Bahn routes were preceded by "S".

With the merging of Berlin in the context of German reunification and the reconstruction of the disused Wittenbergplatz–Anton-Wilhelm-Amo-Straße section in 1993, the BVG decided to swap the western branches of lines U1 and U2, which meet at Wittenbergplatz. The reunited former A^{I} line has since been operated under the new name "U2", but using the traditional red line colour as previously used in the separate parts of the city.

== History ==
The original route

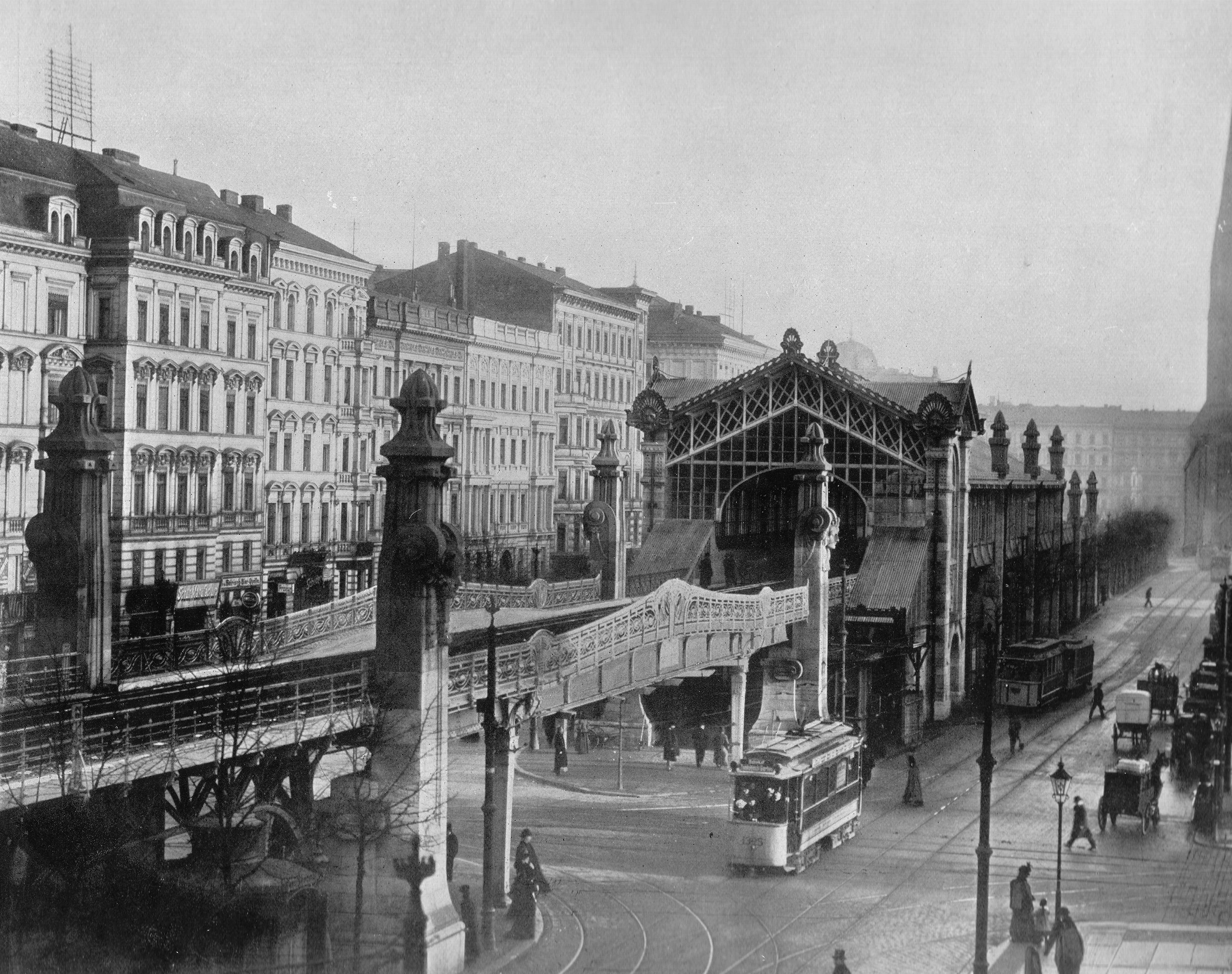
The Bülowstraße elevated station in 1903

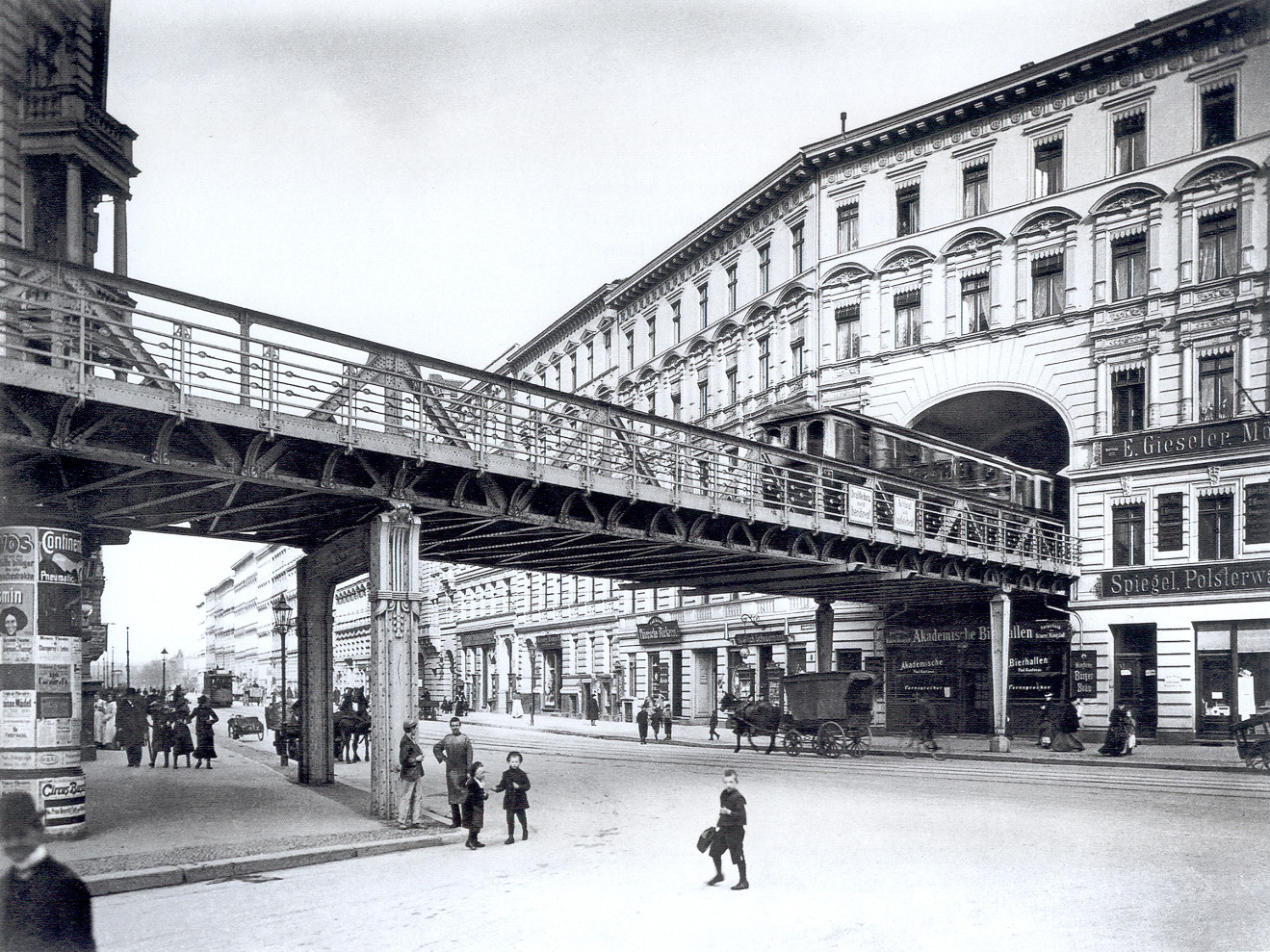
Behind the Bülowstrasse station, the line ran through an apartment building towards Gleisdreieck. View from Dennewitzstrasse; the building containing the passage was destroyed in an air raid in November 1943.

The increasing traffic problems in Berlin at the end of the 19th century led to a search for new efficient means of transport. Inspired by Werner von Siemens, numerous suggestions were made for overhead conveyors, such as a suspension railway, as was later built in Wuppertal, or a tube railway as was built in London. Finally Siemens and some prominent Berliners submitted a plan for an elevated railway on the model of New York. These people opposed Siemens' suggestion of building an overhead railway in the major street of Friedrichstraße, but the city of Berlin opposed underground railways, since it feared damage to one of its new sewers.

Finally, after many years and negotiations, Siemens proposal for an elevated railway line from Warschauer Brücke via Hallesches Tor to Bülowstraße was approved. This was only possible, however, because it passed through poor areas. The richer residents of Leipziger Straße pressed the city administration to prevent the line using their street. Siemens & Halske carried out all construction work and also owned the line. The first sod was turned on 10 September 1896 in Gitschiner Straße. The construction work had to be carried out quickly because the contract with the city of Berlin, signed with the granting of the concession, specified that the line had to be finished within two years, or a penalty of 50,000 marks would be payable.

The railway engineers developed a design for the supporting columns for the elevated railway, but it was unpopular and the architect Alfred Grenander was asked to submit an artistic solution for this problem. For the next 30 years Grenander was the house architect for the elevated and underground railway.

After tough negotiations with the city of Charlottenburg it was decided to extend the line to Knie along the Tauentzienstraße, but instead of being elevated it would be a subsurface (cut-and-cover) railway. The management of the city of Berlin board of works regarded the idea of an underground railway sympathetically. Since the underground caused no apparent damage to the new sewer, an underground branch could be built from a junction at Gleisdreieck (German for "rail triangle") to Potsdamer Platz, Berlin's then city centre. The national government granted permission for the planning changes on 1 November 1900.

The total length of the elevated and underground railway was now 10.1 km (6.3 mi). The largest part of the route, approximately 8 km (5.0 mi), would be established on viaducts and connect eleven elevated stations. In addition there would be 2 km (1.2 mi) of underground line with three underground stations. The planners believed that 8-carriage trains would not be needed and therefore designed it with 80 m (262 ft 6 in)-long platforms, sufficient only for 6-carriage trains.

The first 6 km (3.7 mi) of the line was finished in 1901 and on 15 February 1902 the first train ran on the line from Potsdamer Platz to Zoologischer Garten, then to Stralauer Tor and back to Potsdamer Platz. This allowed many prominent Berliners to participate in the opening trip, including the Prussian minister for public works, Karl von Thielen. On 18 February 1902 the first stage of the Berlin U-Bahn was officially opened (Stralauer Tor–Potsdamer Platz). In March the line was extended to Zoologischer Garten and on 17 August it was extended by 380 m (1,250 ft) from Stralauer Tor to Warschauer Brücke. There were at that time only two lines:

- From Warschauer Brücke to Zoologischer Garten via Potsdamer Platz (with reversal).
- From Warschauer Brücke directly to Zoologischer Garten.

On 14 December the line was extended to Knie. The section between Gleisdreieck and Knie (now Ernst-Reuter-Platz) is now part of U2.

=== Charlottenburg extension ===
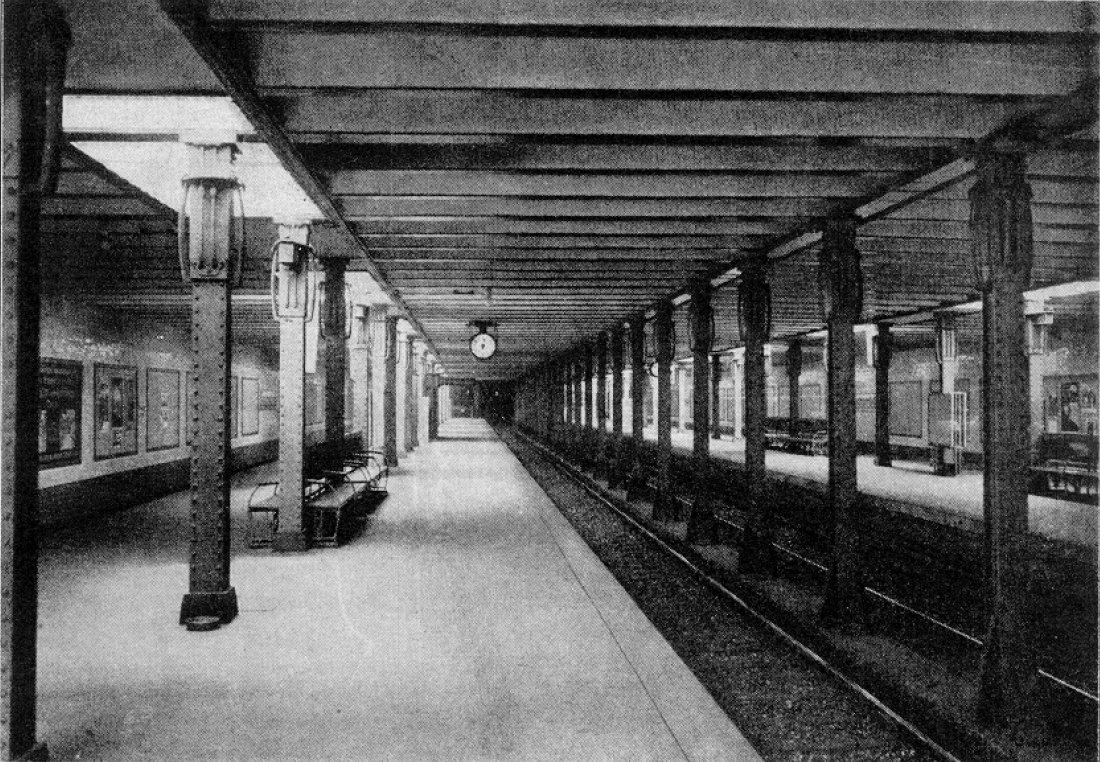
Deutsche Oper station, formerly Bismarckstraße

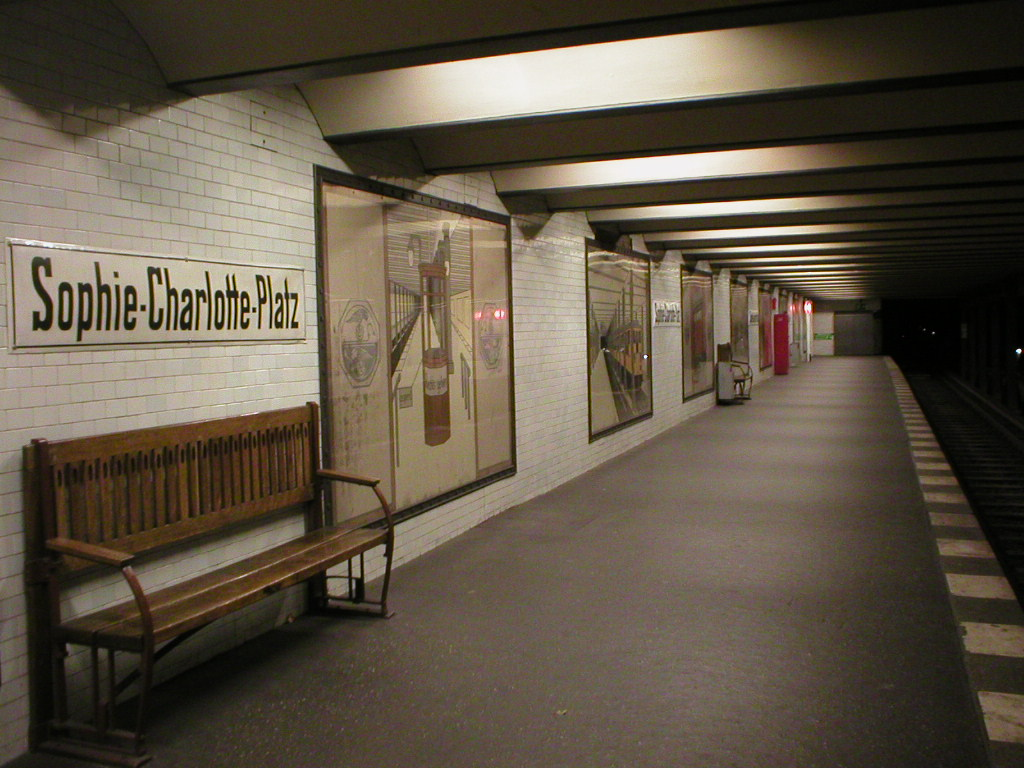
Sophie-Charlotte-Platz station

After the opening of the original route further plans to extend the three route branches emerged: via Charlottenburg city to Wilhelmplatz (now Richard-Wagner-Platz) and towards Reichskanzlerplatz (now Theodor-Heuss Platz), from Potsdamer Platz to the centre of Berlin and via Warschauer Straße to Frankfurter Tor The fastest route negotiations were completed with the young and coming city of Charlottenburg because there was a lot of vacant land that could be developed. The most important negotiating point was to build a route via Charlottenburg Town Hall in Wilhelmsplatz. Here an extension along Berliner Straße (now Otto-Suhr-Allee) would have served, but this was served at the time by the Berlin-Charlottenburg tramway and a parallel line did not seem sensible. Therefore, this line would continue under Bismarckstraße to the west and then curve to the town hall. Under the working title of Krumme Straße, the line was initially planned with a station at Bismarckstraße (now Deutsche Oper) and a terminus at Wilhelmplatz. The line was opened between Knie and Wilhelmplatz on 14 May 1906. Both U-Bahn lines now ran to Bismarckstraße, but only the branch to Potsdamer Platz also ran to Wilhelmsplatz.

While this line was under construction, the railway company and the city of Charlottenburg agreed on a branch towards Westend. Therefore, a planning amendment was necessary at the planned station at Bismarckstraße, because the line to Westend would branch there. Therefore, the station was built as the first four-track U-Bahn station in Germany. The two inner tracks would be used for the line to Wilhelmsplatz and the outer tracks for the line to Westend.

Since the western Charlottenburg area was still completely undeveloped, the line would not generate any profits in its early years. Therefore, the elevated railway company negotiated with the city of Charlottenburg and the other property owners to compensate for the line's deficit. This contract was signed on 23 June 1906.

For the line westwards through Charlottenburg, the following stations were to be built:

- Bismarckstraße (today's: Deutsche Oper)
- Sophie-Charlotte-Platz
- Kaiserdamm
- Reichskanzlerplatz (now Theodor-Heuss-Platz, the terminus)

On 16 March 1908, the Emperor Wilhelm II, opened the line, following the "ministerial trip", the first service on the line. It was officially inaugurated on 29 March 1908. The two existing lines did not continue to Reichskanzlerplatz; instead, a third line was established, operating only between Bismarckstraße and Reichskanzlerplatz.

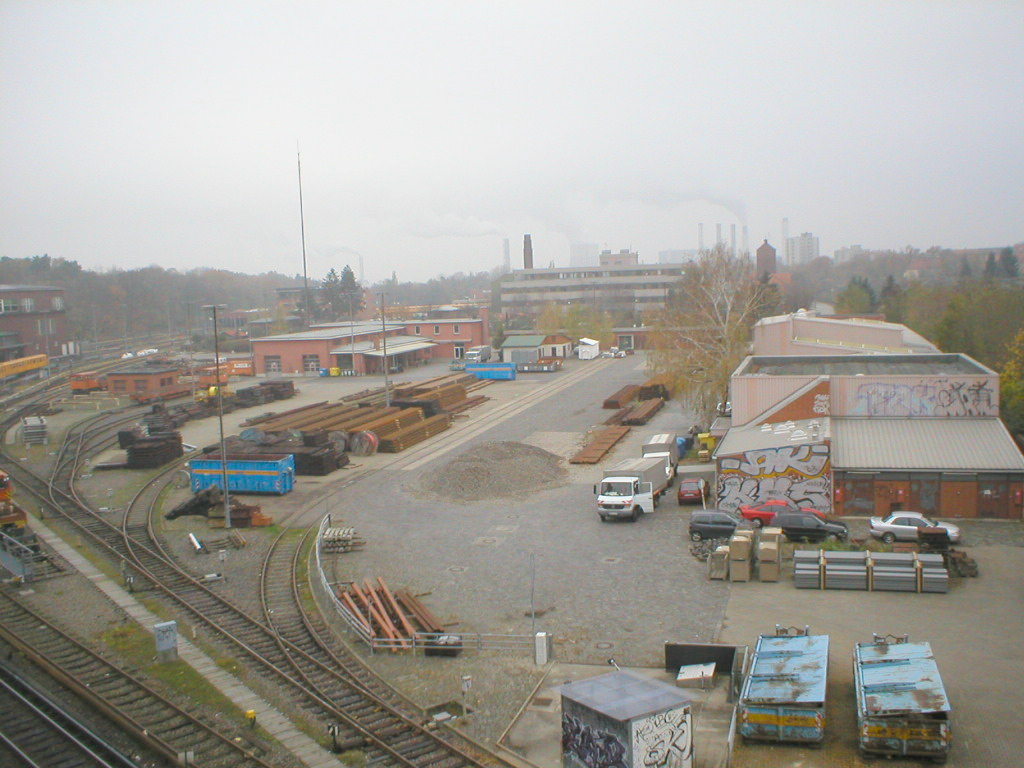
Part of today's Grunewald main workshop near the Olympia-Stadion station

Because of the greatly extended length of the line, a new workshop was desirable as the previous workshop in Rudolfstraße (or Warschauer Brücke) was now no longer adequate. Therefore, the elevated railway company sought a suitable site. Since the Prussian forest administration wanted to market its site of the Grunewald profitably, the interests of both partners were met. The railway company bought only 14 hectares (34.6 acres) of land to build its new operations workshop. At the same time, it undertook, to build an extension of the line to a station at the stadium (now Olympia-Stadion). The elevated railway company received a grant from the Forestry Administration of 200,000 marks to support this project. Services would only be operated there on special occasions. The shell of Neu-Westend station was built with the extension to the stadium station, as there was insufficient traffic to justify completing the station at that time. The new extension was completed on 8 June 1913. The nearby Unterspreewald power station on Wiesendamm in Ruhleben, which was built for the U-Bahn power supply, had already started operation in 1911.

=== The central line ===
After the so-called "stem line" had been extended to Wilhelmplatz (now Richard-Wagner-Platz) in Charlottenburg, the elevated railway company planned to connect the Berlin city centre to the new U-Bahn. The city of Berlin, however, prohibited this because, given the success of the first line, it had made its own plans for the construction of a metro. But the highest decision-maker, the Berlin Police chief, intervened and approved the plans.

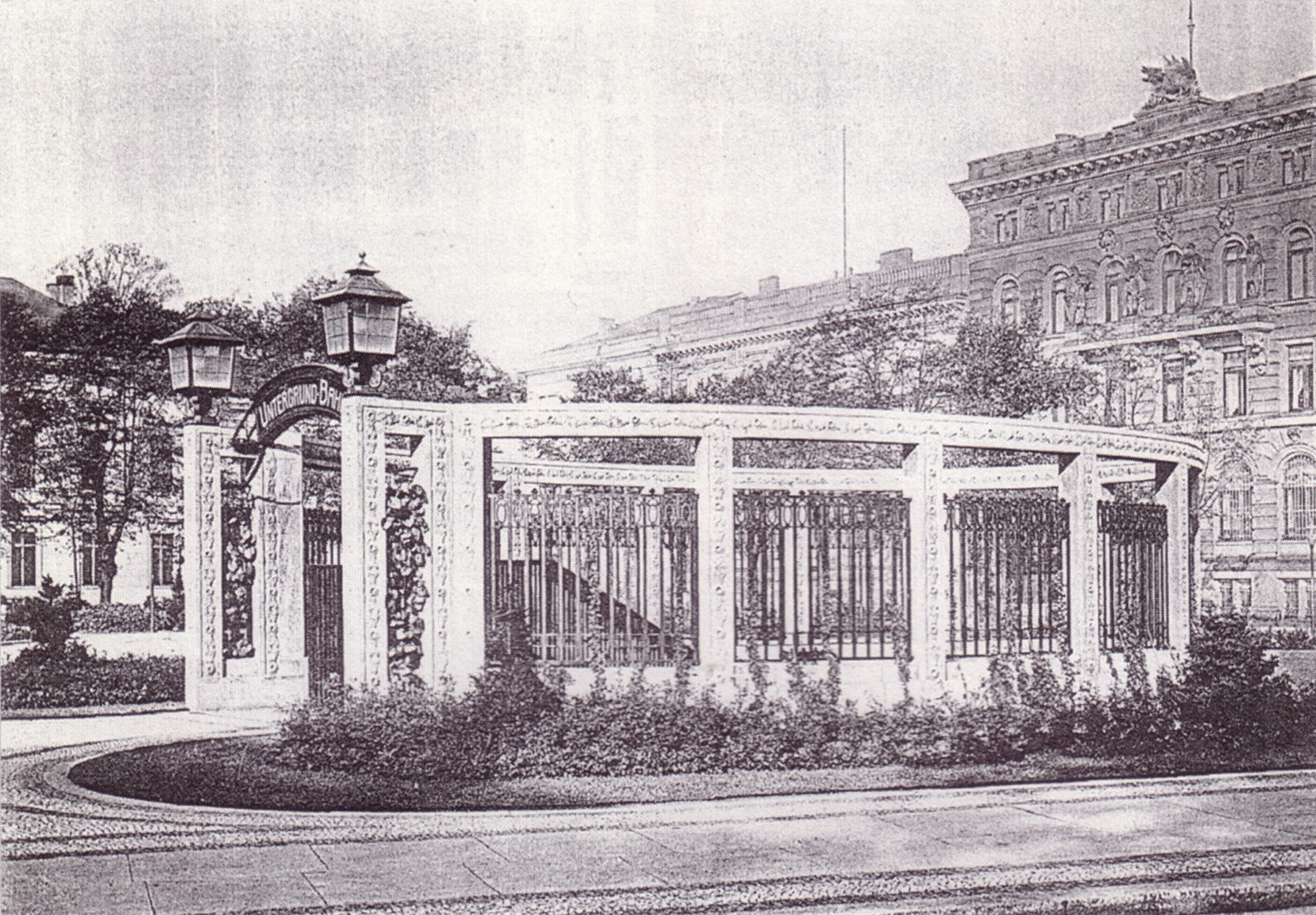
The U-Bahn station of the same name located at the Hotel Kaiserhof (now Anton-Wilhelm-Amo-Straße) was given an entrance designed in accordance with its elegant surroundings.

The elevated railway company planned to run the new line in a straight line under Leipziger Straße from Potsdamer Platz to Spittelmarkt. The "Große Berliner Straßenbahn" (Greater Berlin tramway company), which operated a line along this street, prevented the realisation of these plans by threatening claims for damages, with the support of city of Berlin.

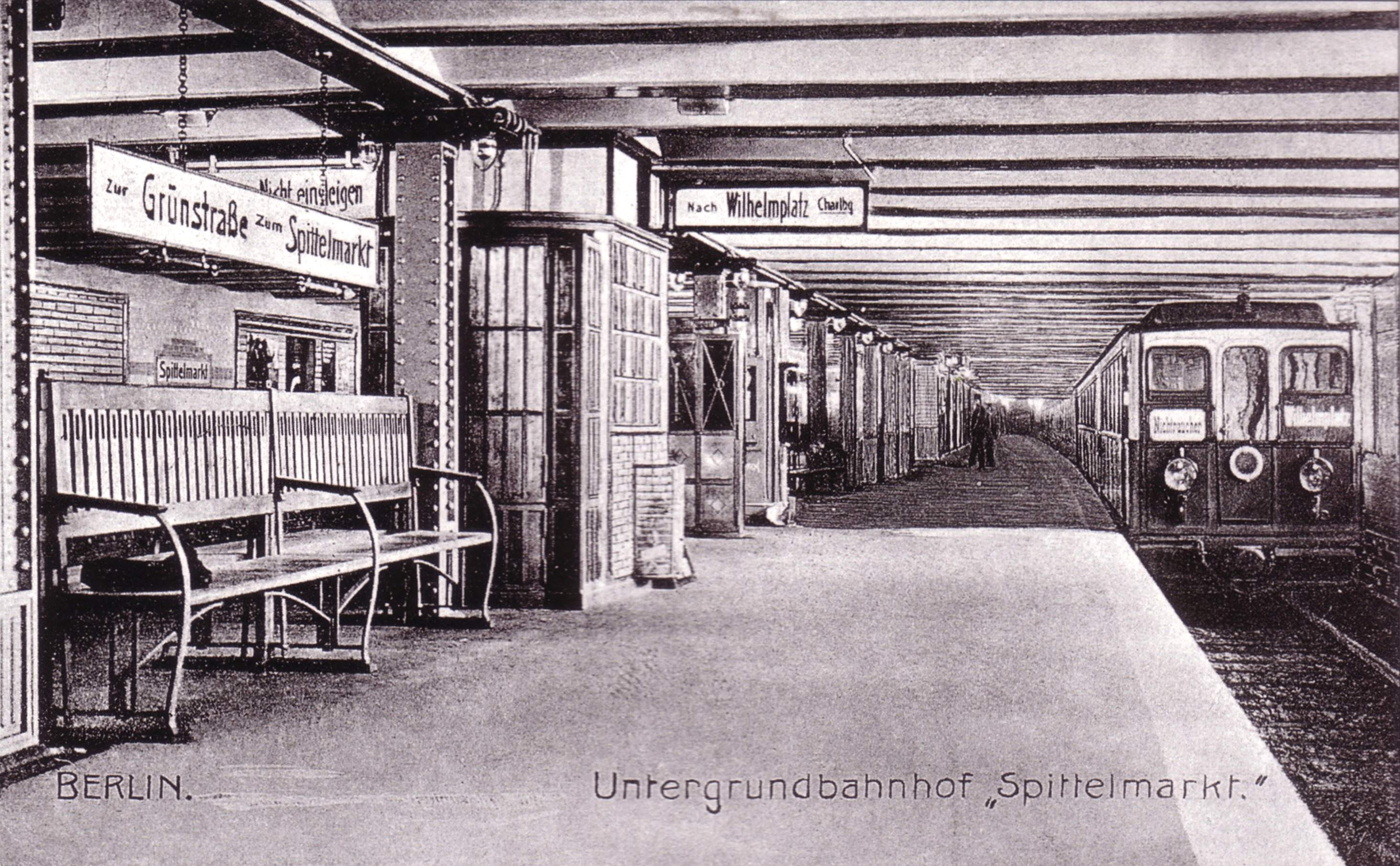
A windowed gallery in Spittelmarkt station provides daylight.

The negotiating partners finally agreed to a long-term route through Spittelmarkt, Alexanderplatz and Schönhauser Allee to Nordring station. The plans initially included the stations of Kaiserhof (now Anton-Wilhelm-Amo-Straße), Friedrichstraße (now Stadtmitte), Hausvogteiplatz and Spittelmarkt. The line was later to continue via the following stations: Inselbrücke (now Märkisches Museum), Klosterstraße, Alexanderplatz, Schönhauser Tor (now Rosa-Luxemburg-Platz), Senefelderplatz, Danziger Straße (now Eberswalder Straße, an elevated station) and Nordring (now Schönhauser Allee, an elevated station).

As the section of the line through Spittelmarkt would be very complex and expensive due to the need to tunnel under the Spree, the plans provided for a (cheaper) elevated line in Schönhauser Allee as compensation. Construction began on 15 December 1905. Potsdamer Platz station, which then had side platforms, was demolished to enable the extension. The new Leipziger Platz (now Potsdamer Platz) station was opened 200 metres (660 ft) away on 28 September 1907.

Spittelmarkt station was built under Spittelmarkt square in 1908. This lies directly next to the Spree, so the subsoil is very wet. Piled foundations were necessary to prevent the station subsiding. A windowed gallery was built on the Spree. It was closed in the Second World War and only reopened in 2004.

The "Spittelmarkt line" was officially opened on 1 October 1908. There were now four different services on the U-Bahn network, two of which used the new line:

- Warschauer Brücke – Potsdamer Platz – Spittelmarkt, and
- Wilhelmplatz (Charlottenburg) – Wittenbergplatz – Potsdamer Platz – Spittelmarkt.

=== Construction of elevated line in Schönhauser Allee ===
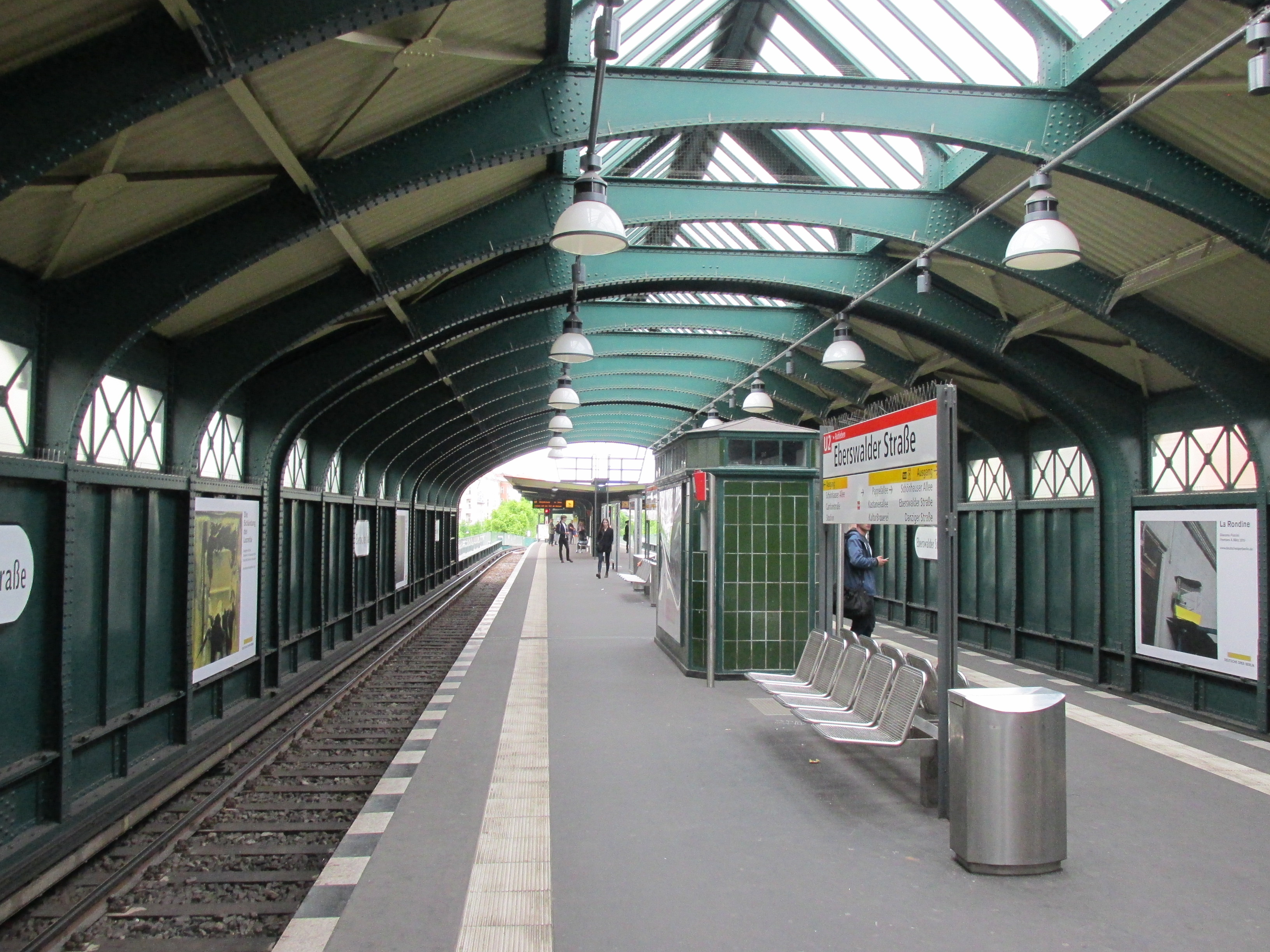
Elevated station at Eberswalder Straße (formerly Dimitroffstraße, originally Danziger Straße)

In March 1910, construction began on the extension of the "Spittelmarkt line" (now also called the "Centrumslinie"—central line) to the north. There were also some challenges here. After the Spittelmarkt station, the line runs along the banks of the Spree. Therefore, a ramp had to be built to pass under the river bed. Inselbrücke ("island bridge", now Märkisches Museum) station was built there at a depth of about six and a half metres. Because the station was so deep, it was built with an impressively high barrel vault that covers the platform, which is rare in Berlin. It and Platz der Luftbrücke station are the only column-free U-Bahn stations in Berlin.

Beyond this station, the line crossed under the Spree and swung under Klosterstraße, where the station of the same name was located. Since there were plans at the time to build a branch line under Frankfurter Allee, space was left in the middle of the platform area for another track. Today a line runs on a similar route from Alexanderplatz to Frankfurter Allee. The Central line continued from Klosterstrasse to Alexanderplatz. During the building of Alexanderplatz station, care was taken to ensure that stairs to other lines could later be added. The line between Spittelmarkt and Alexanderplatz was opened on 1 July 1913. The line between Alexanderplatz and Wilhelmplatz quickly became the most used U-Bahn line.

This extension ran to Schönhauser Allee. Schönhauser Tor station (now Rosa-Luxemburg-Platz) was the first station under today's Torstraße. Since Schönhauser Allee was wide enough, there were no problems with the construction of the tunnel.

The next station was as Senefelderplatz. Beyond this, a ramp emerges from the tunnel and runs to the former Danziger Straße station (now Eberswalder Straße). As mentioned, this was built as an elevated railway, because the tunnel section at Spittelmarkt was very cost-intensive and the construction of the elevated railway on the broad Schönhauser Allee was very cheap.

After Danziger Straße station there was a longer elevated viaduct to the former Nordring station (now Schönhauser Allee). There, the existing Ringbahn was crossed, not underground, but on an even higher level. The S-Bahn now runs in a cutting there. This was the terminus of the line. The extension from Alexanderplatz to Nordring was opened just three and a half weeks after the line to Alexanderplatz was opened on 27 July 1913.

=== The new Gleisdreieck ===
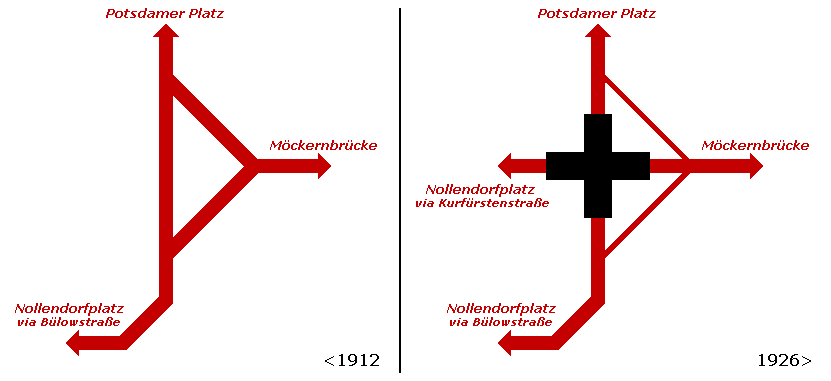
Gleisdreieck before and after the reconstruction

One of the most dangerous places of the entire U-Bahn network was found at the triangular rail junction at Gleisdreieck, which connected the main line between Warschauer Brücke and Zoologischer Garten with the branch line to Potsdamer Platz. This branch was protected only by signals, so that driver inattention could easily lead to a disaster, as happened on 26 September 1908. A U-Bahn train ran into the side of another train, forcing two carriages off the track. One carriage fell over the viaduct and 21 passengers died. As a result, it was decided to change the configuration at Gleisdreieck.

Construction began in May 1912 to replace the triangular junction with two lines built as a grade-separated cross with a new Gleisdreieck interchange station at the intersection. These lines now form part of U1 and U2. The new work was carried out largely with full services operating, although services were briefly interrupted on each line. On 3 November 1912, the new Gleisdreieck station was opened but construction was not completed until August 1913. The connecting track from the Pankow direction to the Warschauer Straße direction continued to be open until the completion of work for use by construction supply trains.

=== Two new termini ===
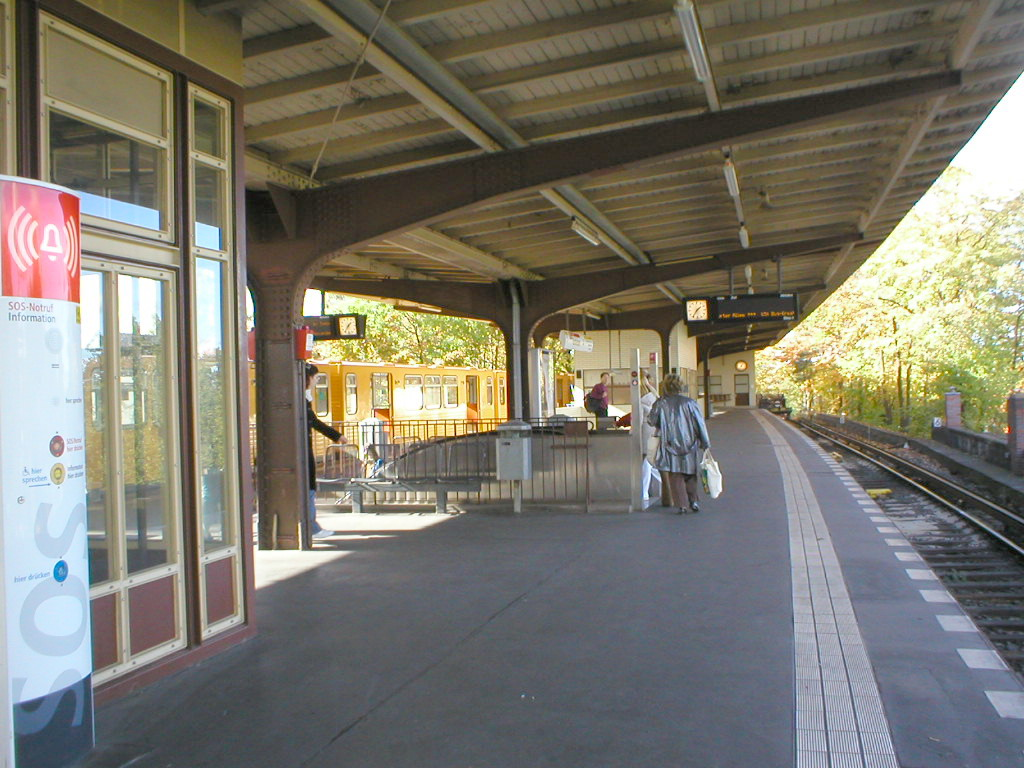
The current U2 terminus in Ruhleben

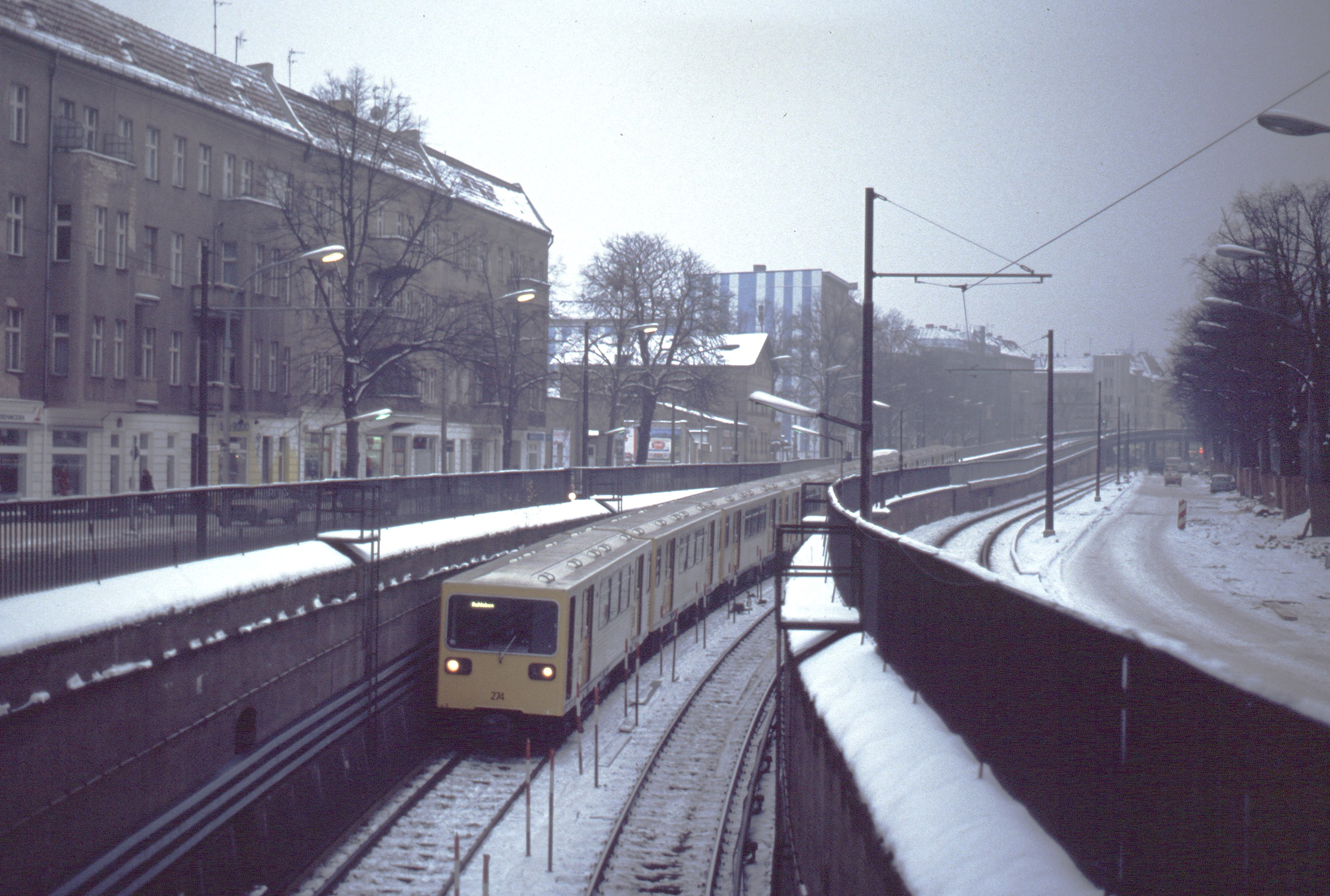
Ramp to the Vinetastraße station with a class GI train, 1993

The small profile network was only slightly expanded during the Weimar Republic. There has been regular train traffic to Stadion since 1913 and Neu-Westend station, which was already partly built at that time, was finally opened on 22 May 1922.

The new Gleisdreieck station was also completed to form a cross; the "relief line" from Gleisdreieck via Kurfürstenstraße to Nollendorfplatz was opened on 24 October 1926. The austere Kurfürstenstraße station testifies to the difficult financial situation of that time. Nollendorfplatz station was also completely rebuilt and rearranged as part of the construction of the relief line, since the U-Bahn of the formerly independent city of Schöneberg (today's line U4) was still operated independently, although it was now part of the City of Berlin.

The former “stem line” from Nordring to Stadion was extended by one station in each direction. Pankow station (now Vinetastraße) was built in 1930 to its north. There was one main reason for its construction: trains ran so often to Nordring station that it was not possible to reverse them on the viaduct. It was much easier to provide a reversing facility underground. A further planned extension to Breiten Straße in Pankow or to Pankow S-Bahn station was not built at that time and construction did not recommence until 1997. At the opposite end, the line was extended by one stop to the new terminus of Ruhleben on 22 December 1929. This line ran on an embankment. An extension through a garden and industrial area to nearby Spandau was planned to start a little later. However, the Great Depression and the Second World War prevented these plans from being carried out and the 1929 extension remains the western end of the U2.

=== Nazism and the Second World War ===
After the seizure of power of the Nazis two stations on line A^{I} were renamed after people highly regarded by the Nazi party. Reichskanzlerplatz station (now Theodor-Heuss-Platz) was renamed Adolf-Hitler-Platz on 24 April 1933. Schönhauser Tor station (now Rosa-Luxemburg-Platz) was renamed after SA ("Brownshirts") Sturmführer (lieutenant) Horst Wessel on 1 May 1934.

Under the plans to transform Berlin into "Germania" in 1939, the route of line A at that time would have changed relatively little compared to other plans of the time. In addition to the northern extension to Pankow, referred to in the plans as Pankow (Breite Straße), which had been planned for years, the elevated line at Gleisdreieck was to be dismantled and replaced by a new, underground and direct route to Bülowstraße. The proposals for an extension to Spandau that were made in previous and later plans were not incorporated. The proposed lines F^{I} and F^{III} served this purpose. The first tunnel work started at what is now Theodor-Heuss-Platz, but was stopped in 1941. It was intended that work would resume after the predicted "final victory".

After the war began on 1 September 1939, the order was given to all modes of transport to only run with darkened headlights. This affected not only the trains, but also to the S-Bahn and U-Bahn stations—only a few lights were left on.

In the autumn of 1943, when the Allied bombing of Berlin increased sharply, many people took refuge in U-Bahn stations. The official regulations stated that at the sound of an air raid siren, all U-Bahn stations were to be closed, however this rarely happened and many people mistakenly believed that they were protected from air raids. For example, the entrance to Senefelderplatz station collapsed as a result of a bomb during the raids that occurred on November 3 and 4 in 1943. In 1944, as the air raids continued, the Berliner Verkehrsbetriebe had trouble keeping the U2 line in operation, as many stations were affected such as Gleisdreieck, Nollendorfplatz, Olympiastadion, Potsdamer Platz, and Klosterstraße.

In 1945, the situation deteriorated further and the U-Bahn operated only as a shuttle between some stations. The entire U-Bahn came to a standstill on 25 April 1945.

Shortly before the end of the Battle of Berlin on 2 May 1945, SS troops blew up the North-South tunnel of the S-Bahn at the Landwehr Canal, which in addition to flooding the S-Bahn tunnel also caused water to flow through connecting passages into the U-Bahn network. Line A^{I} was completely under water between Alexanderplatz and Potsdamer Platz stations and it took a long time to repair the damage.

=== New beginning after the war ===
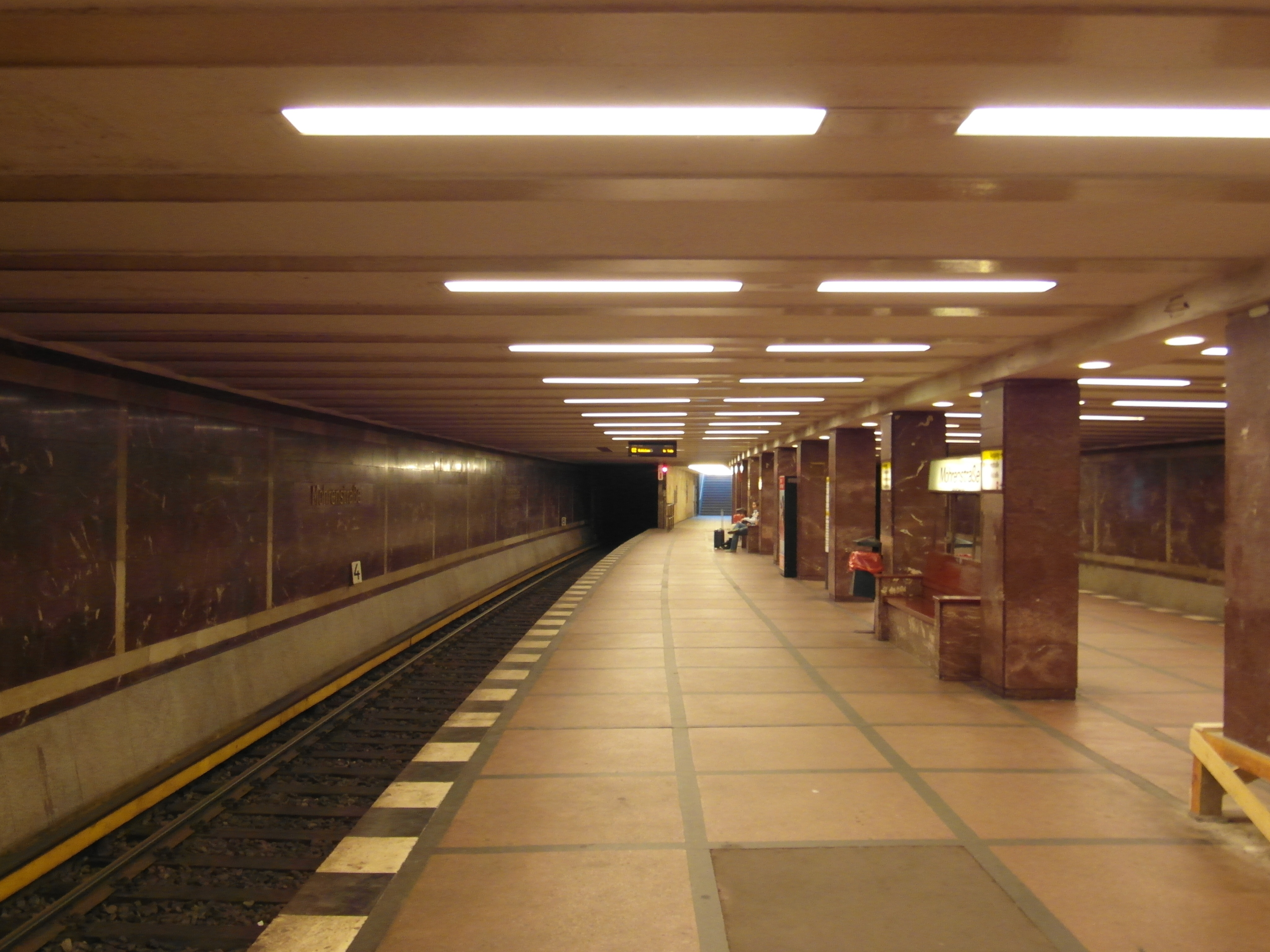
Anton-Wilhelm-Amo-Straße station (formerly Kaiserhof) was clad with Saalburg marble in 1950

The repair of the U-Bahn network began after the German surrender. On 14 May 1945, the first trains had already begun running in the area around Hermannplatz. The first shuttle trains were able to run on line A^{I} on the section of line between Knie and Kaiserdamm as well as between Kaiserdamm and Ruhleben on 17 May. The stations renamed Reichskanzlerplatz and Schönhauser Tor during Nazi Germany were returned to their original names. In the following months, further sections were reopened on 18 September trains on line A^{I} between Pankow and Potsdamer Platz and between Gleisdreieck and Ruhleben, while the section between Potsdamer Platz and Gleisdreieck was operated in shuttle mode.

=== The division of the city and 17 June 1953 ===
The beginning of the Cold War and its first major escalation, the Berlin Blockade in 1948/1949, caused great uncertainty among Berliners. Many West Berliners avoided East Berlin. This created new traffic flows that bypassed the eastern sector. Berliner Verkehrsbetriebe, the operator of the U-Bahn, was split in 1949 into an eastern and a western company. While bus and tram lines now ended at the sector border, the U-Bahn continued to operate in both sectors.

Kaiserhof station was returned to operation under the name of Thälmannplatz on 18 August 1950, the sixth anniversary of Ernst Thälmann’s death. This made line A^{I} fully operational again. The station in Wilhelmplatz in the heart of the government district was called after the Hotel Kaiserhof, because the name Wilhelmplatz had already been assigned to a U-Bahn station that had been built in Charlottenburg a few years earlier (now called Richard-Wagner-Platz). The wife and daughter of Thälmann, Rosa and Irma, attended the opening ceremony and the renaming of the square as Thälmannplatz. Since the government of East Germany mainly occupied offices in the old government district of Wilhelmstrasse, it wanted an impressive station. It is unique in Berlin because of its construction in Saalburg marble in the style of the 1950s. The East Berlin press described it as the most beautiful in Berlin.

At the beginning of 1953, the Western BVG installed loudspeakers at the last stations in the western sectors, warning of the crossing into the Soviet sector. Turnback facilities were set up at these stations to allow the trains to terminate there if necessary. In addition, the timetable was designed so that when a U-Bahn train ran east, another train ran west at the same time. As a result, the West would lose only a few U-Bahn sets to the East in the event of an incident.

This proved itself in June of the same year, when East Berlin workers responded with protests to an increase in the Arbeitsnorm ("work norm": the quantity of work required to be performed in a shift). News of the 17 June 1953 uprising spread across the GDR. About 20,000 strikers demonstrated not only against the norm increases, but also against the general conditions in the country. The BVG East stopped U-Bahn operations and Deutsche Reichsbahn stopped S-Bahn operations at the border at 11 am. The western trains now ended in the new turnback facilities. In total, the West Berlin BVG lost only 18 trains due to the well thought-out timetable. The northern section of line D, including the stations of Voltastraße and Gesundbrunnen, which had no connection to the rest of the West network, was closed.

The traffic situation returned to normal after a few days after the bloody suppression of the uprising. As a consequence of the experience of 17 June, the Western BVG established a new route of the A^{II} from Krumme Lanke to Kottbusser Tor which was independent of East Berlin, but which was soon abandoned. In addition, the Schöneberg line now ran only as far as Nollendorfplatz, not as previously to Warschauer Brücke.

=== The construction of the Wall ===
East-Berlin transport network with the two U-Bahn lines (shown in blue), 1984

The construction of the Berlin Wall to seal off the sector boundary between the two parts of Berlin resulted in line A also being split into two, as it crossed the city from east to west. On the orders of the then GDR Interior Minister Karl Maron, trains on the section of line A (now U2) in East Berlin terminated at Thälmannplatz station (now Anton-Wilhelm-Amo-Straße).

Lines C and D (now U6 and U8) of the West Berlin BVG were left alone, but the stations located in the eastern sector were closed (becoming ghost stations). Connections were not allowed from the eastern section of line A and lines C and D or at Stadtmitte and Alexanderplatz stations.

Maron had originally assumed that the West Berlin BVG would terminate their trains on the western section of line A at Potsdamer Platz, but in fact the trains were terminated one stop earlier, at Gleisdreieck. Tracks to allow trains to change direction here had been built in the early 1950s as a precaution. Therefore, the East Berlin BVG used the reversing tracks at Potsdamer Platz and occasionally even ran its trains into West Berlin.

The splitting of line A and the closure of those stations on lines C and D under East Berlin completed the split of the unified Berlin public transport network, as the trams and buses had not crossed the sector border since 1953. The Berlin S-Bahn ran throughout Berlin at the direction of the GDR-controlled Deutsche Reichsbahn and therefore never formed part of the unified public transport network.

One consequence of the 13 August 1961 crisis was that the S-Bahn was increasingly boycotted in West Berlin. Often the slogans chanted were, "The S-Bahn driver pays for the barbed wire" or "No more pennies for Ulbricht". So West Berliners took the U-Bahn, the bus and—if still available—the tram.

=== Line A (U2) in East Berlin ===
The split of the U-Bahn network left only two lines under the direction of BVG-Ost. The first was the whole of line E (now U5) from Alexanderplatz to Friedrichsfelde, which was opened in 1930. The second line was the eastern part of the line A, mainly opened through the city centre and to Pankow in 1908–1913. Both these lines crossed in the center of East Berlin at Alexanderplatz, where there was a connection to the S-Bahn. The other two lines in the district centre were under the control of West BVG. The stations located in the Eastern sector were closed and bricked-up, treated as ghost stations. These stations were patrolled by GDR security forces to stop East Berliners escaping to the West via the U-Bahn.

The U-Bahn network played a less important role in East Berlin than in West Berlin. The focus in the East was more on the extensive S-Bahn and tram networks. In 58 years (1930–1987), only one new U-Bahn station (Tierpark) was built in the eastern part of the city, while the S-Bahn expanded and many new tram lines were built.

Plans were made to use the part of line C (now U6) on East Berlin territory and to extend line A through the city centre in a tunnel along the Friedrichstraße, but these were not put into action.

The stations of Stadtmitte, Hausvogteiplatz, Spittelmarkt, Rosa Luxemburg-Platz and Senefelderplatz were remodelled and given new wall tiles in the 1960s, all for show, as U6 ran through without stopping. In 1987, the stations of Markisches Museum and Klosterstraße were remodelled, as part of the rebuilding for the celebration of 750th anniversary of Berlin, with artistic representations of the urban development of historic buses and trams instead of advertising space that is typically found in non-socialist economic systems. Alexanderplatz station did not change and is still preserved almost in its original condition and Potsdamer Platz, which was unused for 32 years, also did not change.

=== New Station: Bismarckstraße ===
Due to the S-Bahn boycott and closure of the tram network, the U-Bahn was expanded in West-Berlin. However, this affected only the more modern large-profile network (today's U6 to U9). Construction projects on the small-profile network were limited to the construction of new interchanges on new U-Bahn lines.

On the route of today's U2, work of this nature was carried out in 1978 in Charlottenburg between the current stations of Deutsche Oper and Sophie-Charlotte-Platz.

During the construction of line 7, a line that connects several district centres with each other outside of the actual city centre, several existing lines were crossed. These included lines 4, 2 (now U3), and 1 (now U2). The intersection of lines 1 and 7 was in Bismarckstraße / Wilmersdorfer Straße, 380 metres (1,250 ft) west of Deutsche Oper station. Despite the short distance between the sites, a new station was built to enable interchange.

Before the beginning of work on line 7 and Bismarckstraße station, the shuttle line from Deutsche Oper to Richard-Wagner-Platz (called "line 5" in the timetable) was closed. This connection was replaced by the new line 7.

As the already 70-year-old tunnel of Line 1 consisted only of weakly reinforced concrete, the BVG simply removed the existing tunnel and rebuilt it with a completely closed reinforced-concrete frame. After that the station was built as a multi-level structure, connecting to street level. The new line 7 platform was 110 metres (361 ft) long and 11.6 metres (38 ft 1 in) wide. In contrast, two uncomfortable side platforms, each of which was 4.5 metres (14 ft 9 in) wide, were built for the small-profile line. To enable the construction of a central platform, the tracks would have had to be separated and the line closed for a long time. The new station was opened under the name of Bismarckstraße together with the extension of line 7 on 28 April 1978.

=== Temporary uses of the elevated line ===
==== Flea market, Turkish bazaar and museum tram ====
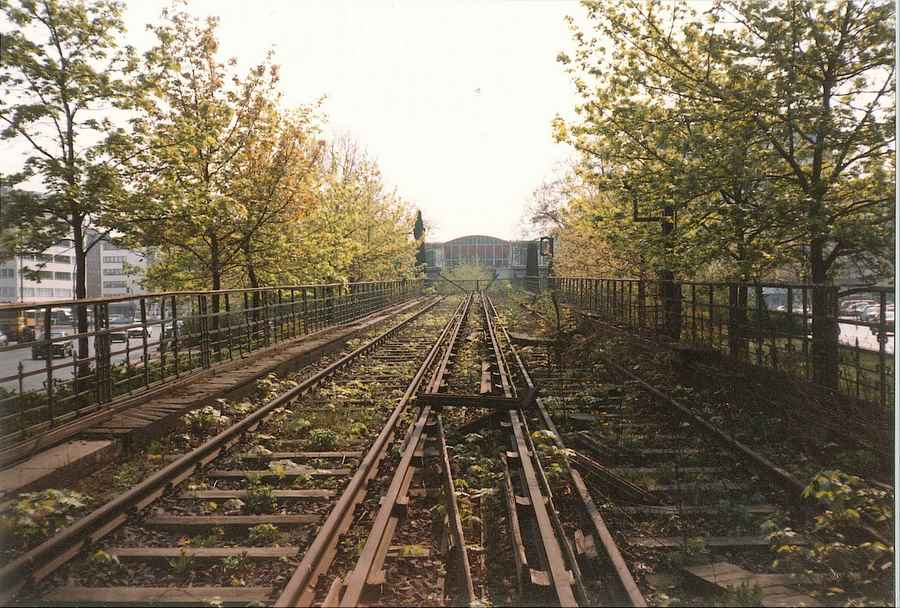
Unused route between the stations of Wittenbergplatz and (in the background) Nollendorfplatz, 1988

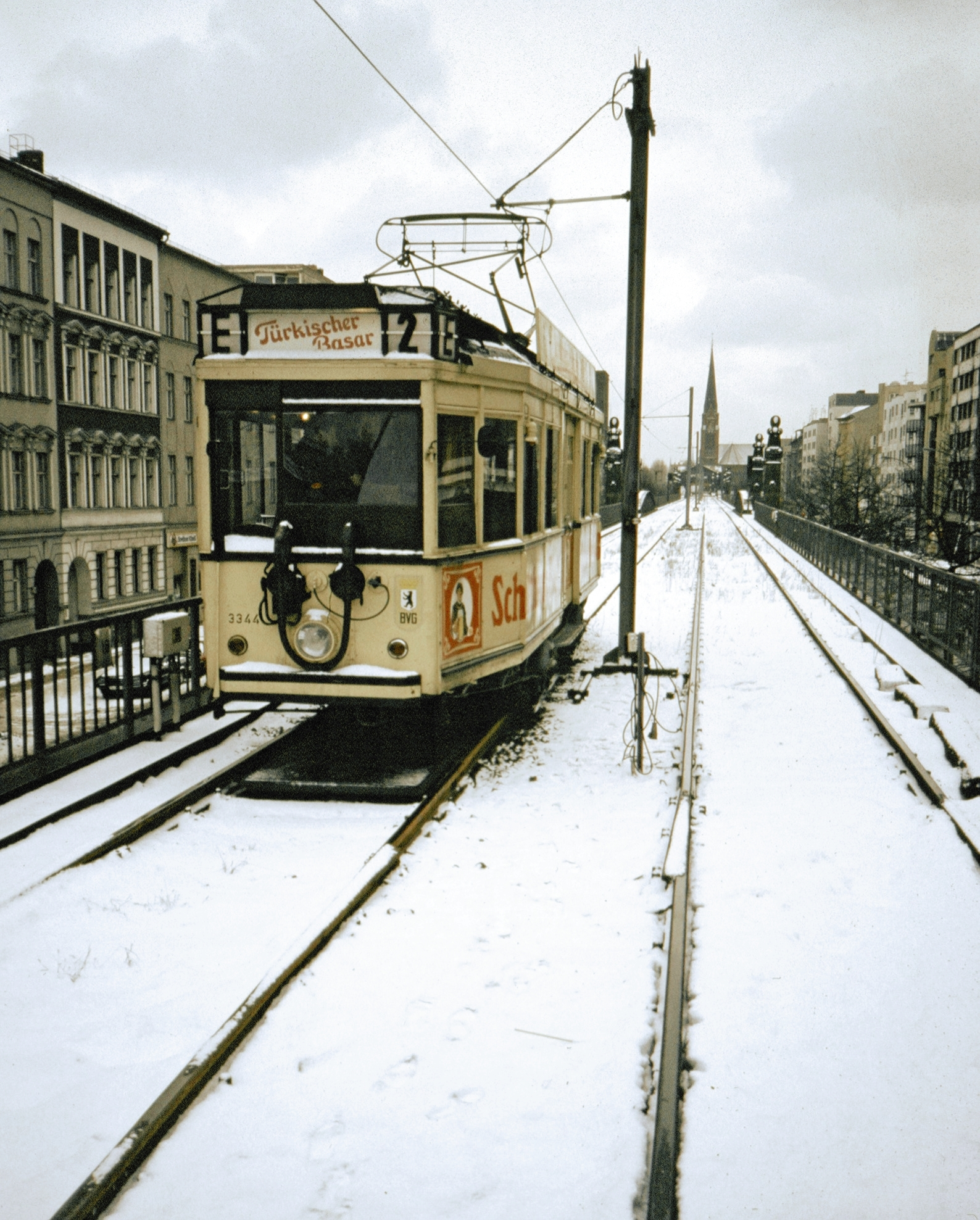
Museum tram on class TM 33 on the elevated line at Nollendorfplatz, 1987

The line in West Berlin between Gleisdreieck and Potsdamer Platz near the border with the East had been disused since the wall was built on 13 August 1961. The section between Wittenbergplatz and Gleisdreieck via Nollendorfplatz and Bülowstraße was rarely used because it was no longer possible to continue to East Berlin at the time. For economic reasons, operations on that section of line, then designated as line 2, were also discontinued on 1 January 1972. Subsequently, trains on line 2 from Krumme Lanke ended at Wittenbergplatz.

The unused elevated railway line through the north of Schöneberg was then used temporarily for several purposes. The tunnel from Wittenbergplatz towards Nollendorfplatz was used for reversing trains since there was no other way for trains on line 2 to reverse.

A flea market popularly known as the Nolle operated at the elevated station of Nollendorfplatz in 16 decommissioned U-Bahn cars from 1973. There was a new restaurant on the tracks operated by Heini Holl, which was called Zur Nolle.

An operation similar to Nollendorfplatz station was built at Bülowstraße—this was where the Berliner Jahrmarkt (funfair) began in 1975. Since this project was unsuccessful, it closed a year later. A new business concept started on 28 May 1978. The U-Tropia – Bahnhof der Nationen (station of nations) project was set up in two U-Bahn cars that were no longer required. The cars were equipped with toilets and many things were sold in the station itself.

In order to increase the attractiveness of the two markets, the BVG established a shuttle service of museum trams on the elevated railway in August 1978. But U-Tropia closed during the next winter. As no new project had been established at Bülowstraße station, the shuttle service closed. In September 1980, the Türkischer Basar (Turkish bazaar) project opened at Bülowstrasse station. This market was successful and continued until the elevated railway was reopened for U-Bahn traffic. The shuttle service on the elevated railway was discontinued on 28 February 1991.

==== Test track for automatic train operation ====
After installing Linienzugbeeinflussung (a cab signalling and train protection system) on the line U9, the SelTrac operating system of SEL was tested without passengers on part of the unused section of the elevated railway from 1977 to 1981. This made it possible to run at an absolute braking distance and thus allowed trains to run closer together. The tracks, excluding the section between the U-Bahn stations of Bülowstraße and Potsdamer Platz, which was being used for other purposes (markets and storage facilities), were equipped with inductive loops for this experiment. SelTrac equipment was installed on two small profile two-car sets. A system was installed with operations management, a dispatching centre, an operations centre, turnout controls and station facilities. The conductor loops were used to transfer movement authorities and other information, as well as location data. For this purpose, the maximum 3.2 km (2.0 mi)-long inductive loops intersected every 25 metres (82 ft).

==== The M-Bahn ====
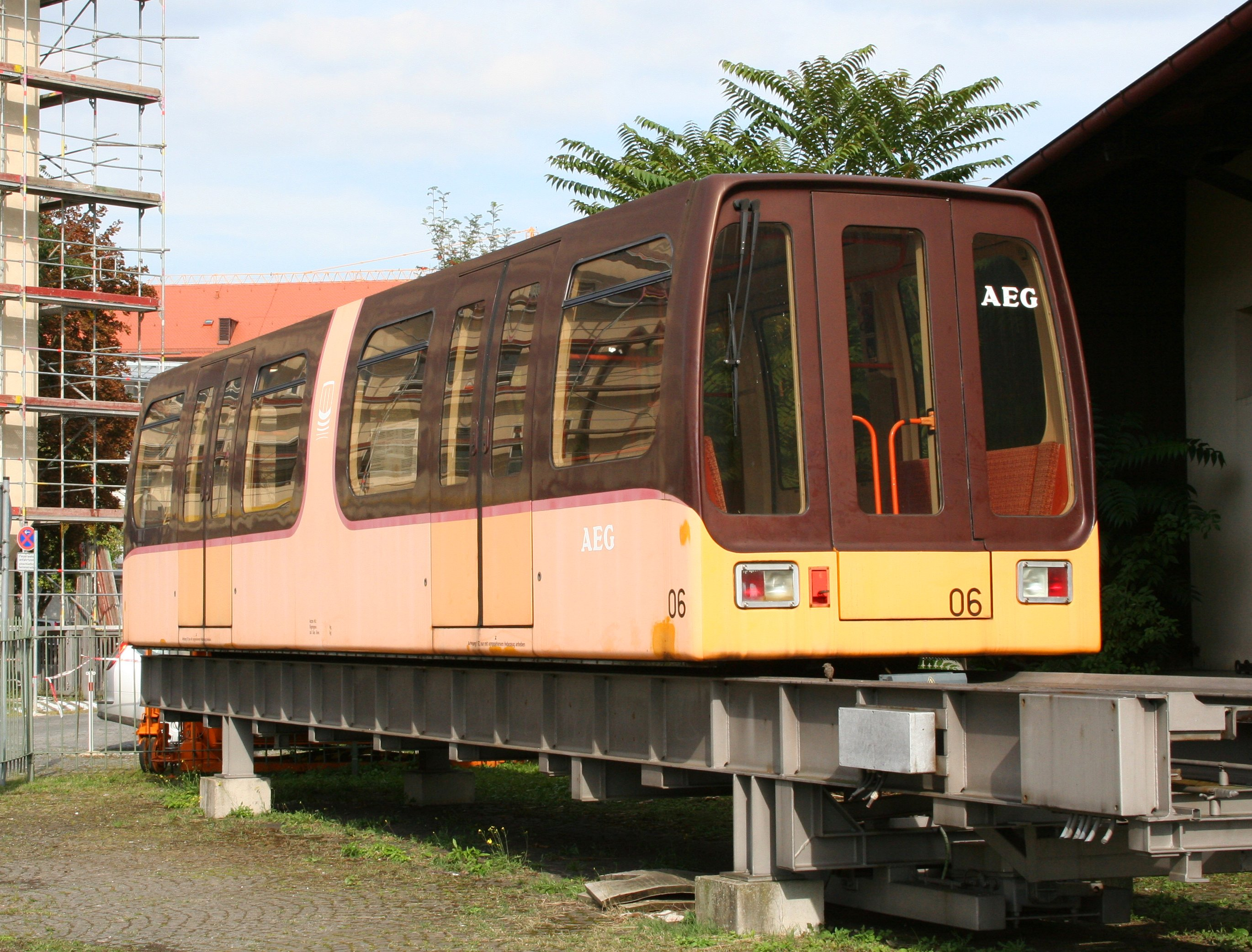
M-Bahn cars, here in the DB Nuremberg Transport Museum in 2006

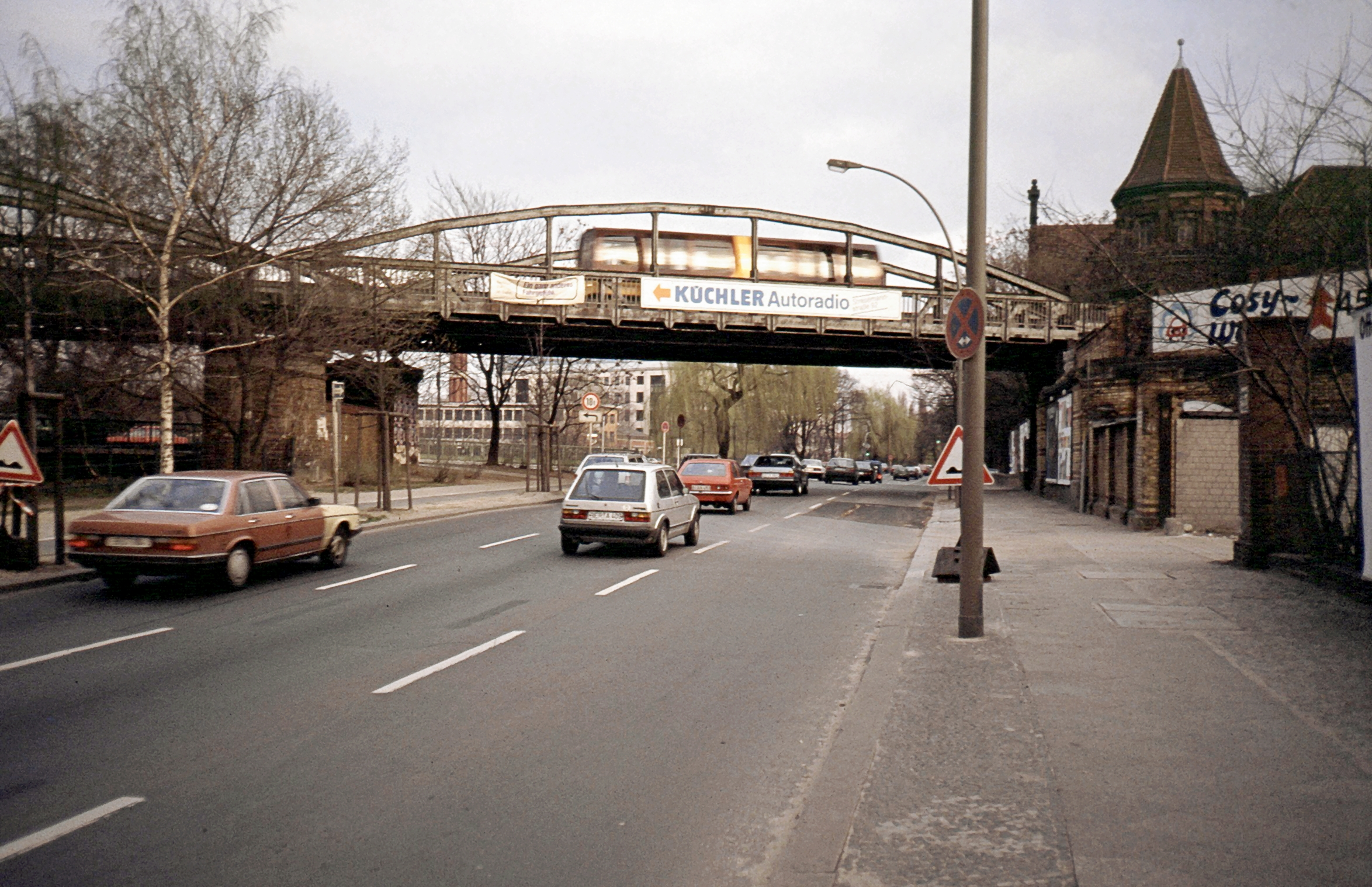
Bridge over Schöneberger Ufer carrying M-Bahn, 1991

U-Bahn services only operated on the upper platform of Gleisdreieck station used by line 1, while there were no passenger services on the lower level. At the request of the Senate of Berlin, the House of Representatives decided on 2 December 1980 to make available the section of the line that had been used in the automatic SelTrac test mode since 1977 to AEG for Maglev test operations. The Senate planned to convert the small profile network of the U-Bahn to magnetic levitation, but this raised considerable concerns in the BVG. Construction work on the new facilities began in December 1983. In addition to the lower platform of Gleisdreieck station, the stations of Bernburger Straße (roughly at the site of today's Mendelssohn-Bartholdy-Park station) and Kemperplatz were established. The first measured trials on this 1.6-kilometre (0.99 mi)-long line started a year later. On 19 December 1988, there was an accident at the terminal station of Kemperplatz due to an operating error with the control system when an unoccupied M-Bahn test train went beyond the end of the track, broke through a glass wall and got stuck 6 metres (19 ft 8 in) above the ground.

The public was allowed to try out the M-Bahn, as it was called from then on, for free from 28 August 1989. The final approval for the M-Bahn to operate as a new passenger transport system was given by the technical supervisory authority on 18 July 1991. As a result, passengers had to pay the usual BVG tariff for an M-Bahn journey. Just two weeks later, the M-Bahn had to stop operating to make room for construction work to reopen the section of the U2 U-Bahn line that had been closed 30 years earlier. The facilities of the M-Bahn were dismantled and initially stored, as it was intended that they would later be reused for a connection to Schönefeld Airport. This idea was later discarded and the material scrapped. There are no remains of the line. An M-Bahn car is displayed at the Oldtimer Museum Rügen in Prora on an original piece of the line.

=== Fall of the wall and reunification of the networks ===
After the opening of the border on 9 November 1989, numerous temporary measures were taken to cope with the huge cross-border traffic. While S-Bahn services were quickly restored at Friedrichstraße station, it was not possible to reconnect line A quickly after it had been disrupted for 28 years.

However, the so-called "ghost stations" (closed stations, which were passed without stopping) on the U6 and U8 reopened, so interchange was enabled from East Berlin's line A to West Berlin's U6 and U8 at Stadtmitte and Alexanderplatz stations respectively.

On 1 July 1990, East Berlin's lines A and E were integrated into the western numbering scheme of the BVG. Line A was given the line number "U2". That led to a three-year-long curiosity, since the two U2s were not yet connected. Three months later, on 3 October 1990, the day of the reunification, the Berlin U-Bahn network was largely free of "Communist " station names, which were mostly replaced by politically neutral names. This involved renaming two stations on the U2 line: "Dimitroffstraße" to "Eberswalder Straße", and "Otto-Grotewohl-Straße" to "Mohrenstraße".

The new station name of Eberswalder Strasse resulted from a power struggle between the Senate and Prenzlauer Berg district: since the latter refused to rename the former Danziger Strasse, which was named after the Bulgarian Communist Party leader Georgi Dimitroff. The BVG, on the order of the senator responsible for transport matters, renamed the elevated station after the street opposite, even though Eberswalder Straße was much less significant. It has retained its name after Dimitroffstrasse was returned to its original name in 1995.

Against the resistance from the conservative side, however, one name was retained: since Rosa Luxemburg also has numerous streets and squares named after her in western Germany, it was not possible to rename Rosa-Luxemburg-Platz back to Schönhauser Tor.

In 1991, work began on rebuilding the missing link between the two parts of the U2, the section from Wittenbergplatz via Gleisdreieck and Potsdamer Platz to Mohrenstrasse. This required some obstacles to be overcome and problems to be solved. The interim uses applied in the Schöneberg elevated stations described above had to be ended and the M-Bahn line had to be dismantled. In the area of Potsdamer Platz station directly below the former border, the numerous security and border installations had to be removed.

Finally, after numerous renovations, conversions and demolitions, the two lines were reconnected on 13 November 1993. At the time of the reopening, services on the Berlin small profile network were rearranged:

- U1, previously Ruhleben – Schlesisches Tor, now Krumme Lanke – Schlesisches Tor
- U2, previously Krumme Lanke – Wittenbergplatz (West) and Anton-Wilhelm-Amo-Straße – Vinetastraße (Ost), now Vinetastraße – Ruhleben.
- U3, previously Uhlandstraße – Wittenbergplatz, now as U15, Uhlandstraße – Schlesisches Tor.
- a new night service, U12, Ruhleben – Schlesisches Tor, on the route of the former U1. However, the U12 was discontinued in 2003 when night services were introduced on the weekend on almost all Berlin U-Bahn lines.

=== Two new stations in late 1990s ===
When the U2 reopened in 1993, preliminary work had been carried out on a new station on it. At the time, the ramp between Gleisdreieck and Potsdamer Platz stations had to be built completely rebuilt to enable the 120-metre-long station to be completely horizontal. Therefore, the ramp was redesigned and built a little steeper. The need for this station arose from the completion of new developments around Potsdamer Platz. A station with the provisional name of Hafenplatz was built by the BVG with two side platforms and opened as Mendelssohn-Bartholdy-Park station on 1 October 1998. The construction works were done without impeding the operation of U2. The station, designed by the architects Hilmer & Sattler und Albrecht is 619 m from Potsdamer Platz and 469 m from Gleisdreieck stations.

For decades, there had been plans for an extension of the U2 to Pankow S-Bahn station. In 1930, the line had been extended to Vinetastraße. A further extension towards the north was not built due to the Great Depression. Even during the Nazi era, the development plans always provided for the U2 to go at least to Pankow station or even to Pankower Kirche. It was the same in the GDR in the late 1980s, there were even announcements made about its construction. This was mainly because BVG lacked a workshop for small-profile rolling stock. All trains were serviced either in the Friedrichsfelde large-profile workshop or in the Reichsbahn's Schoeneweide workshop, which acquired the function of a main workshop. These premises were no longer considered acceptable and so space was sought for a new workshop, since the existing (very small) workshop at Rosa-Luxemburg-Platz station did not meet the requirements. This was to be built east of the Pankow freight yard on Granitzstraße. As part of these plans, the U-Bahn line would be extended by one station. Part of the planned tunnel extension was completed in 1988; after the fall of the wall, the tunnel has converted into a reversing facility.

It was not until the mid 1990s that an extension began to be considered again. New interchanges were provided between the S-Bahn and U-Bahn at numerous points on the U-Bahn network, this included the extension of the U2 to Pankow. The groundbreaking ceremony for this new expansion of the network took place on 13 June 1997. The construction of a new small-profile workshop, as announced in GDR times, was also considered. While it was decided not to proceed with this project, since the current Grunewald workshop could carry out all work required without capacity problem, the foundations of a connection to a workshop were provided. Extremely difficult ground conditions, the high water table and the discovery of a medieval settlement slowed progress significantly. On 16 September 2000, the new line was opened with a new station providing interchange to the S-Bahn. The estimated cost of the works was DM 126 million, but it ended up costing only DM 105 million. During the planning, the new station was referred to as "Bahnhof Pankow", but the BVG opened it under the name "Pankow".

The 110 metre-long U-Bahn station with its blue, white and yellow colour scheme had skylights, which were rare in the Berlin U-Bahn network, to enable natural light to penetrate into the station. It was designed by the architect Orlando Figallo. During the construction, a generous entrance building was built at the same time with a lift and escalators to provided convenient connections to S-Bahn line S2 to Bernau. There are also still plans according to which the U2 line would be extended to the old parish church in Breiten Straße in Pankow. This plan is also included in the Berlin Senate's 2030 financial scenario. This is considered a medium-term priority.

The two stations were the first built on Berlin's small-profile network in decades.

=== Further renovation and modernisation ===
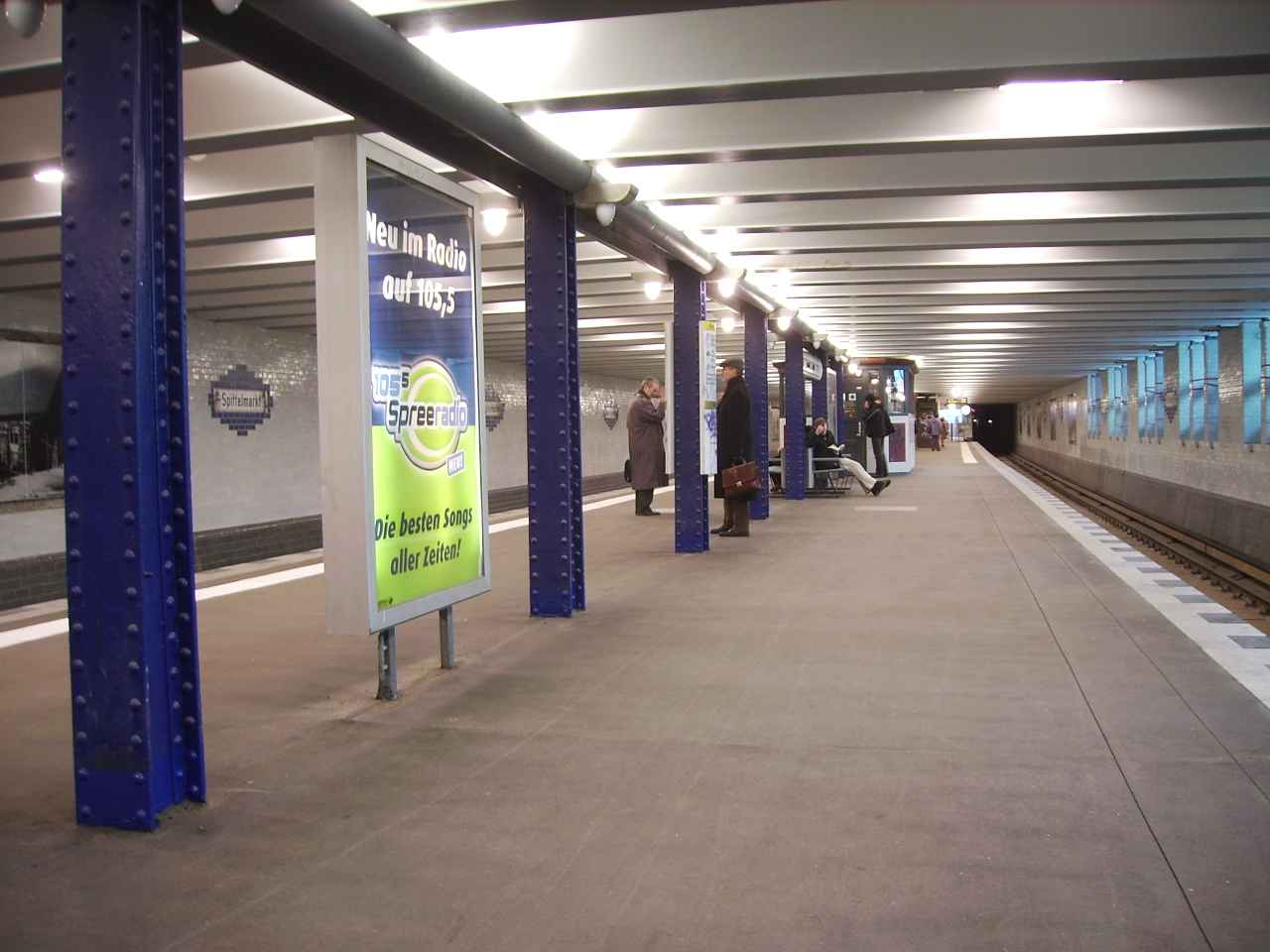
Spittelmarkt station was restored to its original state.

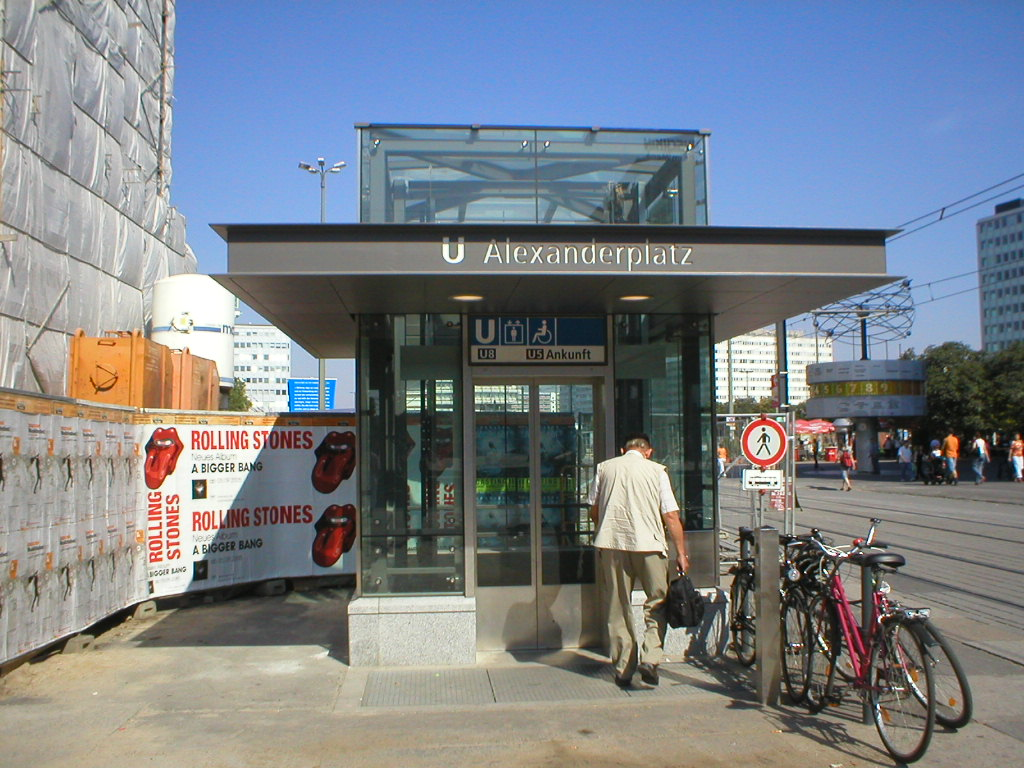
Since 2005, four lifts have been installed at the important Alexanderplatz U-Bahn station to provide barrier-free access at all station levels.

An extensive renovation program is currently being carried out on line U2 and this will continue for the next few years. The Senefelderplatz–Vinetastraße section was closed for several months for the opening of the section to Pankow station. Nevertheless, the stations and the track of the former line A suffered considerably during the GDR era, so the remaining stations in former East Berlin also had to be renovated. Märkisches Museum station was refurbished in 2003 and now also has a lift. The large interchange station of Alexanderplatz also received an all-round renovation and five lifts were installed. BVG had Olympia-Stadion station completely renovated for the 2006 FIFA World Cup for €4.47 million. In addition to new platform slabs and the refurbishment of the entrance building, it received two lifts that can be reached by an independent bridge from the station forecourt.

Another renovation project is also under way on the Alexanderplatz–Stadtmitte section. Here the BVG plans to restore Stadtmitte, Hausvogteiplatz and Spittelmarkt stations to their original condition. The renewal of Spittelmarkt station has already been completed. The window gallery has been reopened there and the walls at the rear of the track have been decorated with newly fired ceramic tiles displaying various historical cityscapes.

In addition, the BVG found in 2005 that a bridge between the Gleisdreieck and Bülowstraße stations, which dates back to the early days of the Berlin U-Bahn and was not renovated after German reunification has been significantly damaged. The renovation of the structure, which lies directly above the tunnel mouth of the North–South mainline tunnel, started on 18 August 2006 and was originally intended to last until the end of the year. Due to problems with the manufacturing of the new steel bridge, the BVG extended the construction work until March 2007. During this period, the U2 was interrupted: the eastern Pankow–Gleisdreieck section was operated almost independently—apart from the connection at Alexanderplatz U-Bahn station. Only push-pull trains ran every ten minutes between Gleisdreieck and Potsdamer Platz due to the difficult situation. The western Ruhleben–Wittenbergplatz section was extended to Warschauer Strasse and formed the new line U12. At this time the Nollendorfplatz–Bülowstraße–Gleisdreieck section was closed. Line U1, on the other hand, was shortened to the Wittenbergplatz–Uhlandstraße section, as in earlier times, while services on line U3 was extended by two stations to Gleisdreieck during the peak. In a €7–8 million reconstruction, the bridge was straightened at the same time, which enabled the top speed to be increased from 40 to 50 km/h (25 to 31 mph). Other projects, such as the modernisation of the U1 elevated line or Jannowitzbrücke station were delayed due to the €8 million renovation that had not been included in the BVG budget. Regular traffic on the U2 line was resumed on 19 March 2007 after the construction work had been completed.

After the fire at Deutsche Oper station, the BVG decided to retrofit all stations that had only one exit with a second exit for safety reasons. Since the spring of 2006, the stations of Theodor-Heuss-Platz, Sophie-Charlotte-Platz and Deutsche Oper have had a second exit installed at the other end of the platform.

In addition to the renovation program, the installation of lifts continues. In recent years Schönhauser Allee, Märkisches Museum, Alexanderplatz, Stadtmitte, Gleisdreieck, Theodor-Heuss-Platz, Olympia-Stadion and, in early 2009, Potsdamer Platz station, which is very important for tourists, have been given a lift.

The 1.7 km-long viaduct of the elevated railway between the stations of Pankow and Senefelderplatz was extensively renovated in 2009 and 2010 at a cost of almost €100 million. Eberswalder Straße station received a lift as part of this work. This means that 20 of the 29 stations had barrier-free access in 2015.

== Timetable ==
Since the timetable change on 12 December 12, 2004, only every second train has operated to Ruhleben during peak and off-peak hours; the others stopped short at Theodor-Heuss-Platz. Since 1990, there has been continuous night services on Friday and Saturday nights on the Ruhleben–Wittenbergplatz route (then line U1). In 2003, this was extended to the entire U2 line. There was already a ten-minute night service on the Vinetastraße–Anton-Wilhelm-Amo-Straße (then Otto-Grotewohl-Straße) route in East Berlin.

Line	Mon–Thu (peak) (7:00–9:30 and 14:30–19:00)	Mon–Thu (shoulder) (6:00–7:00, 9:30–14:30 and 19:00–21:00)	Fri (peak) (7:00–9:30 and 14:30–18:30)	Fri (shoulder) (6:00–7:00, 9:30–14:30 and 18:30–22:30)	Sat (10.00–22:30)	Sun and public holidays (12:30–19:00)	Off-peak (Mon–Fri 4:30–6:00; Mon–Thu from 21:00; Fri+Sat from 22:30 and Sun 19:00–0:30/Sat 5:30–10:00 and Sun 7:00–12:30)	Night Fri/Sat and Sat/Sun and on nights before public holidays (Fri/Sat 0:30–5:30 and Sat/Sun 0:30–7:00)
Pankow ↔ Theodor-Heuss-Platz	4 min school holidays: 4 1/2 min	5 min	4 min school holidays: 4 1/2 min	5 min	5 min	5 min	10 min	15 min
Theodor-Heuss-Platz ↔ Ruhleben	8 min school holidays 9 min	10 min	8 min school holidays 9 min	10 min	10 min	10 min	10 min	15 min
During the nights of Fri/Sat and Sat/Sun, the U2 trains run every 15 minutes between Pankow and Ruhleben from 0:30 a.m. to around 4:30 a.m. During the nights from Sun/Mon to Thu/Fri, night bus line N2 substitutes for the U-Bahn services.

=== Increase in frequencies ===
Under the Berlin Senate's local transport plan for 2019–2023 the frequency is to be increased to 3.3 minutes by 2023 during the peak hour.

== Future Plans ==
There are still plans to extend the U2 towards Pankow Kirche or Rosenthaler Weg. This extension is the only development of the small-profile network included in the Berlin Senate's financial scenario for 2030.

In the west, an extension is planned from Ruhleben to Stadtrandstraße, via Ruhlebener Straße, Tiefwerder Weg, Rathaus Spandau, Flankenschanze, Zeppelinstraße, Westerwaldstraße, Falkenhagener Feld and Stadtrandstraße. It has been deferred to after 2030 because the expected patronage is not high enough to justify the extension.
