= Berlin-Pankow station =

Railway station in Pankow, Germany

Coordinates: 52°34′00″N 13°24′40″E

Berlin-Pankow
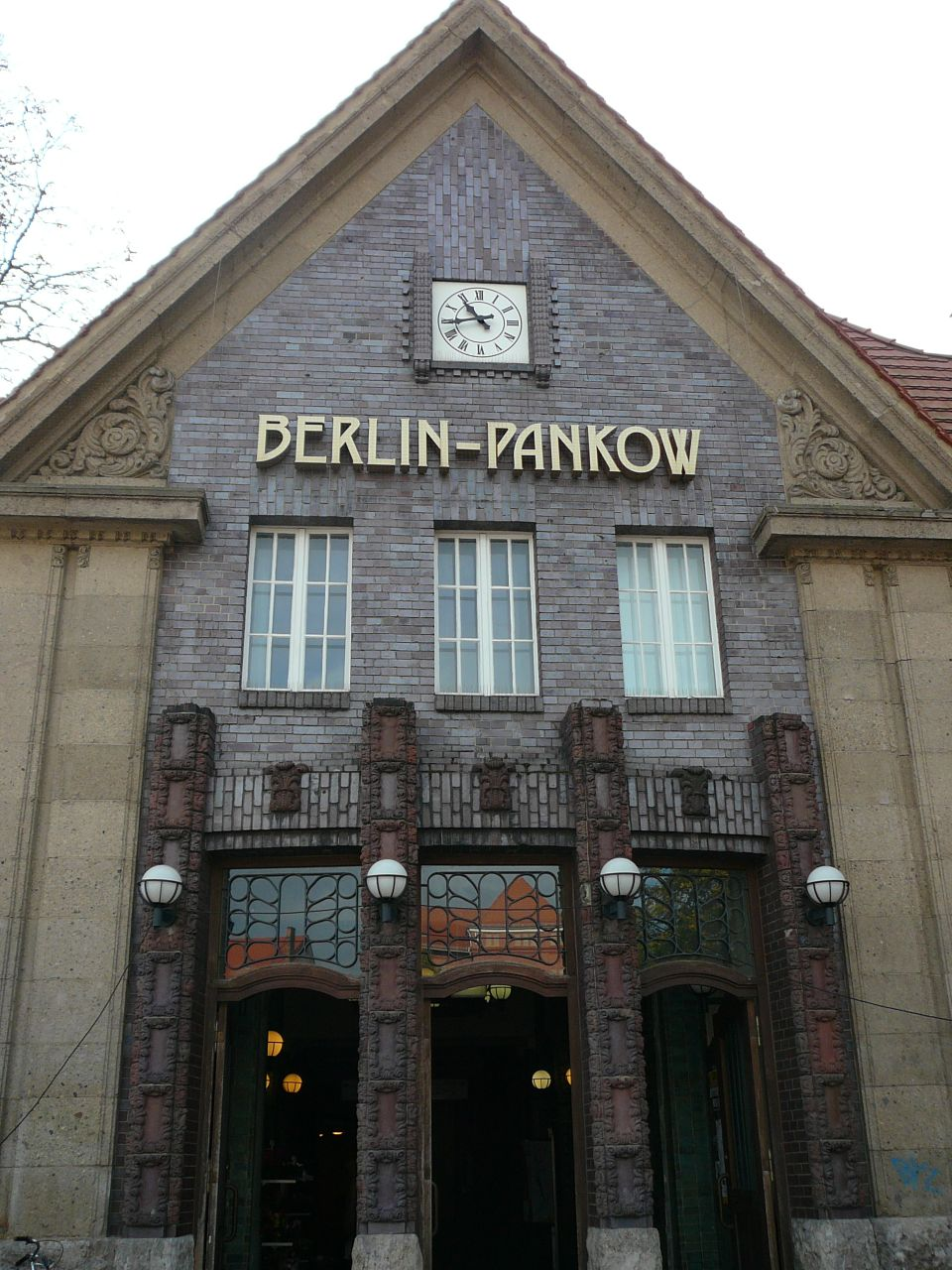

General information
- Other names: Pankow ( only)
- Location: Pankow, Berlin, Berlin; Germany
- Lines: Stettin railway; U2
- Platforms: 1 island platform (Stadtbahn); 1 island platform (U2)
- Tracks: 2 (Stadtbahn); 2 (U2)

Construction
- Structure type: Elevated (Stadtbahn); Underground (U-Bahn)
- Architect: Karl Cornelius and Ernst Schwartz

Other information
- Station code: 0555
- DS100 code: BPKW
- Category: 5
- Fare zone: : Berlin B/5656

History
- Opened: :15 October 1880; 145 years ago : 16 September 2000; 25 years ago
- Electrified: 8 August 1924; 102 years ago
- Former names: 1880-1883 Pankow; 1883-1954 Pankow-Schönhausen

Key dates
- 1909-1914: Current building erected

Services
Preceding station	Berlin S-Bahn	Following station
Pankow-Heinersdorf towards Bernau	S2	Bornholmer Straße towards Blankenfelde
Pankow-Heinersdorf towards Birkenwerder	S8	Bornholmer Straße towards Wildau
Pankow-Heinersdorf towards Blankenburg	S26	Bornholmer Straße towards Teltow Stadt
Preceding station	Berlin U-Bahn	Following station
Vinetastraße towards Ruhleben	U2	Terminus
Route map
U-Bahn station
S-Bahn station
Location

Berlin-Pankow is a station on the Berlin–Szczecin railway, situated in Berlin's Pankow district. It is served by the S-Bahn lines S2, S8 and S26 and is the northern terminus of the U-Bahn line U2.

== Berlin S-Bahn ==
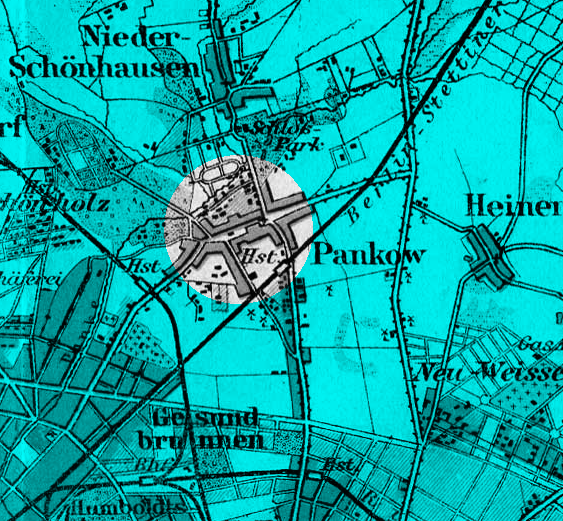
Pankow station (Hst.) and village, 1894

The first station on the site opened on 15 October 1880, south of the former Pankow village. It soon was named Pankow-Schönhausen after the neighbouring Schönhausen Palace. The entrance building was rebuilt in 1911 with the establishment of the suburban railway toward Bernau, which would become the first line of the Berlin S-Bahn on 8 August 1924. The station was renamed Berlin-Pankow in 1954 due to the formerly independent municipality of Pankow merging with the city of Berlin.

With the construction of the freight marshalling yard at Pankow, the passenger station was likewise converted received in the course of the work a platform "after kind of the citizens of Berlin light rail stations". Until 1916, the suburban traffic was separated from the long-distance and freight traffic on the Szczecin railway to Bernau. The new track pair for long-distance and freight traffic went into operation between the previous line and the marshalling yard and was structurally taken into account in its construction. In the course of the expansion, a new reception building was built from 1909 to 1914 to plans by Karl Cornelius and Ernst Schwartz on the north side. A good ten years later, electrical operation was tested on the entire suburban line. Based on the electrification decision in 1913, the German Reichsbahn intended until 1922 still a trolleybus operation and 15 kilovolt 162/3 Hertz AC voltage. Between Pankow and Pankow-Heinersdorf at the beginning of 1921, twelve masts were set up at a distance of around 100 meters. The Reichsbahn decided, however, for the still common today with the Berlin S-Bahn operation with lateral busbar. The transformer plant was erected in Pankow for the power supply. On 8 August 1924, the electrical control mode was activated.

It was supposed to be a regional railway station but plans were scrapped.

Three S-Bahn lines currently serve the Pankow station:

- S2 (Bernau - Karow - Pankow - Gesundbrunnen - Friedrichstraße - Südkreuz - Blankenfelde)
- S8 (Birkenwerder - Blankenburg - Pankow - Ostkreuz - Schöneweide - Grünau)
- S26 (Blankenburg - Gesundbrunnen - Friedrichstraße - Südkreuz - Teltow Stadt)

== Berlin U-Bahn ==
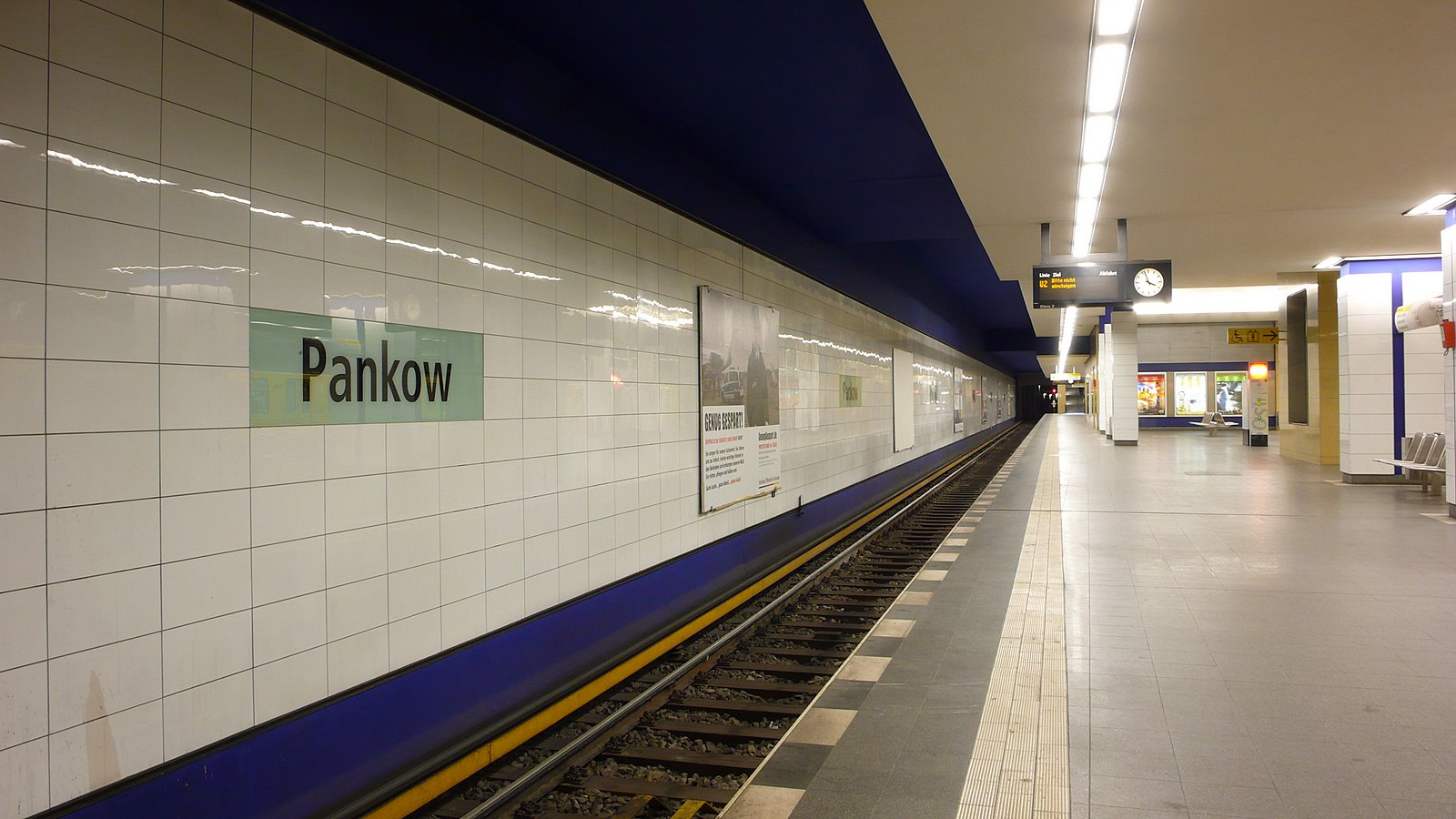
Subway station

When the northern terminus of the U2 U-Bahn line was extended to nearby Pankow (Vinetastraße) in 1930, an extension towards the Berlin Pankow station had been planned to follow. However, no work was completed. In October 1997, the "underground station Pankow" was renamed to Vinetastraße to more precisely reflect its location in light of the start of construction on the extension to the Pankow railway station. The new terminus was opened on 16 September 2000. The next extension(s) possible after the Pankow will be Pankow Kirche, Ossietzkyplatz and Rosenthaler Weg; these plans have all been considered since June 2003.

The possibility of extending the line to Niederschönhausen was first considered in 1957, and was kept on the drawing board when Berlin was divided into East Berlin and West Berlin, in 1961. The city of Berlin had given the green light to build Pankow station only that is connected to the Berlin S-Bahn on 7 November 1987.

=== Proposed Depot ===
A train storage depot for the U2 route had long been proposed for an area just to the south of the existing station. Designs called for a four-track extension to the north of the Vinetastraße station, with the inner two tracks acting as yard leads and the outer two serving as revenue trackage for the proposed extension towards Pankow. In 1986 ministerial approval was granted and construction began in 1990, but German reunification put the plan on hold due to a review of infrastructure projects in the now-united city. When construction on the extension to Pankow resumed in 1997, the storage depot was not included and the concept has since been abandoned due to reunification allowing access to other storage yards elsewhere on the U-Bahn network.
