= Wilhelmplatz =

Square in Berlin, Germany

Coordinates: 52°30′42″N 13°23′02″E

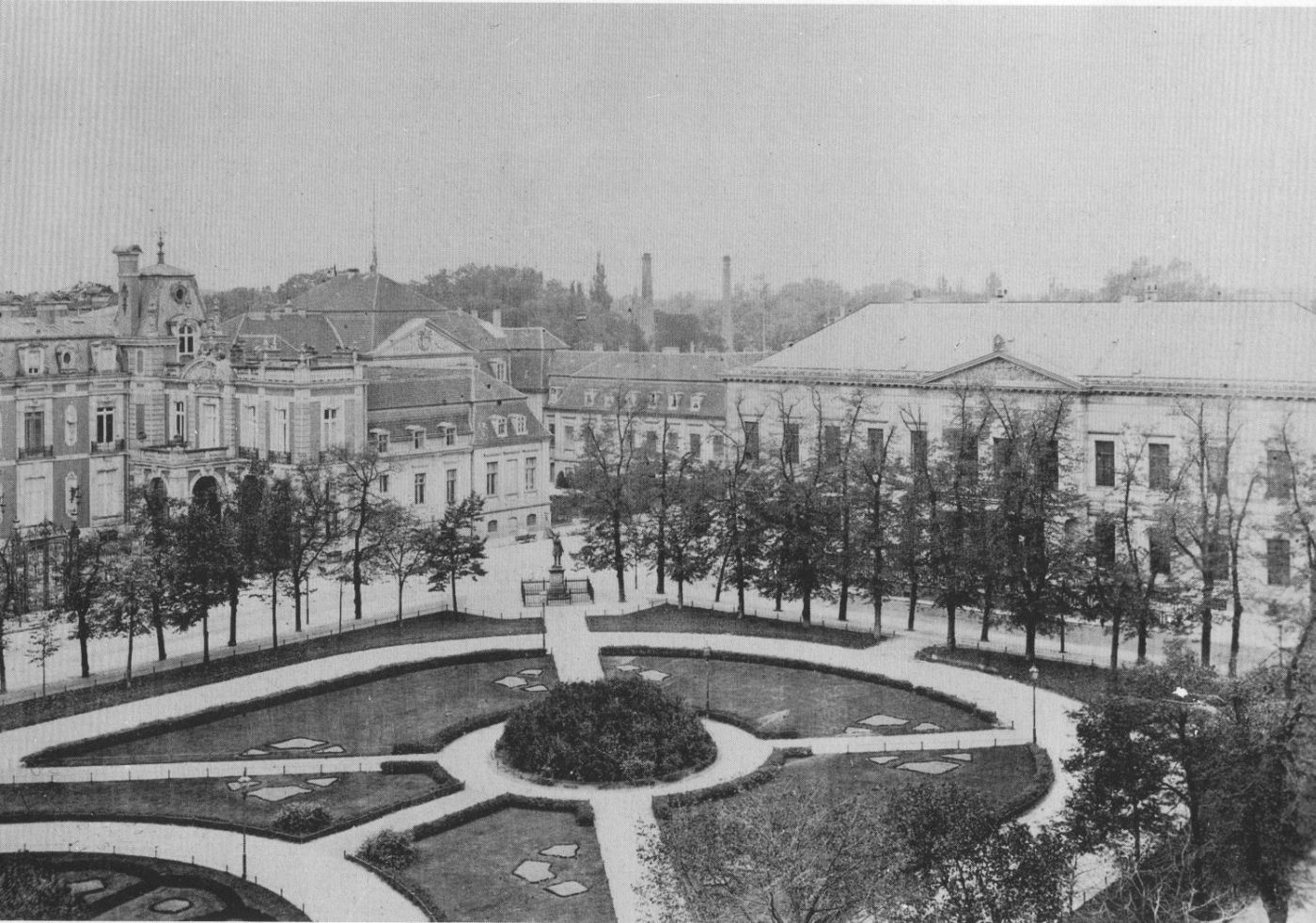
Wilhelmplatz in the early 1900s with the Ordenspalais on the right, Reich Chancellery on the centre, and Palais Pless to the left

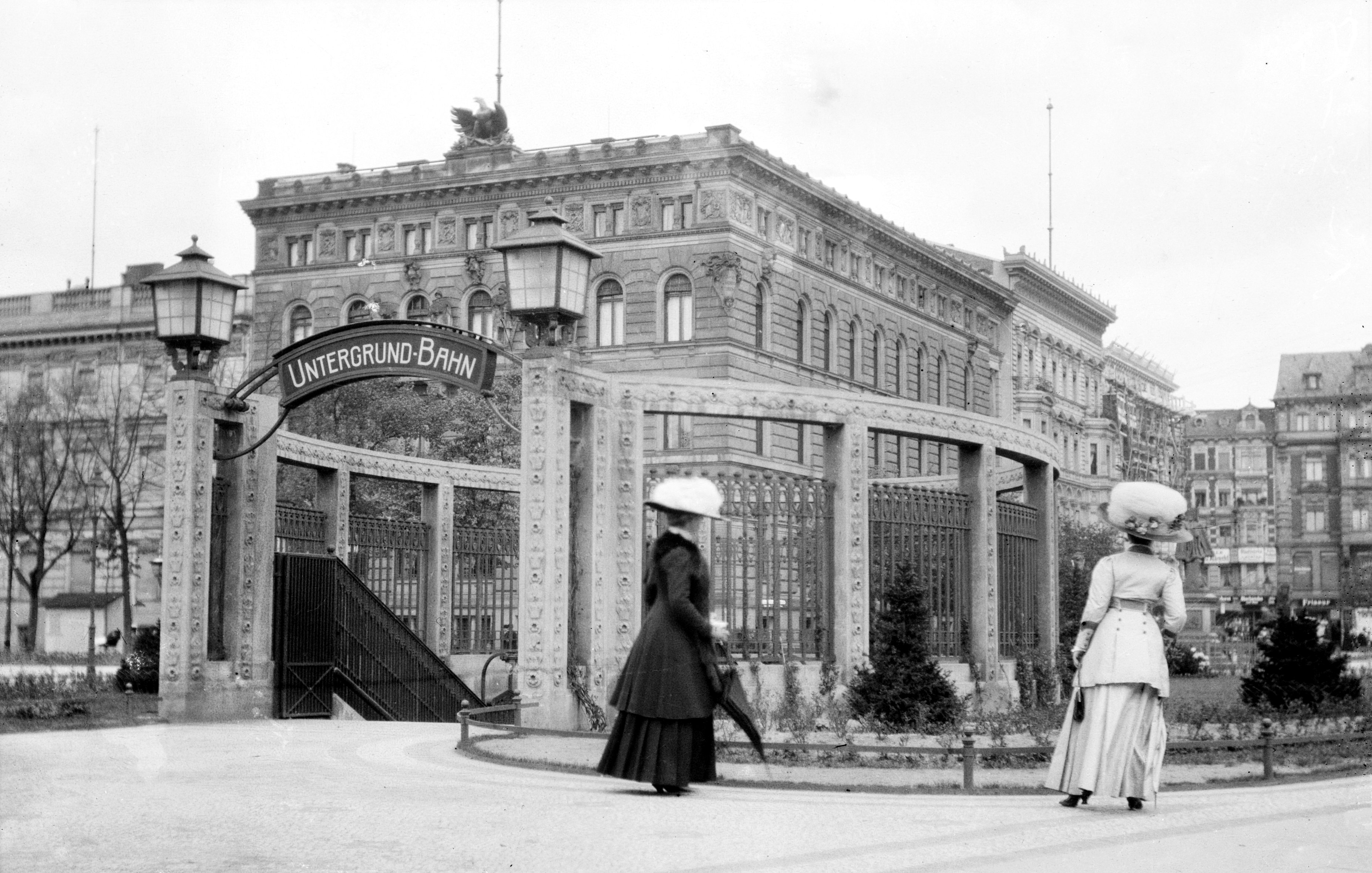
The U-Bahn station on Wilhelmplatz, early 1900s

Wilhelmplatz was a square in the Mitte district of Berlin, at the corner of Wilhelmstrasse and Voßstraße. The square also gave its name to a Berlin U-Bahn station which has since been renamed Mohrenstraße. A number of notable buildings were constructed around the square, including the old Reich Chancellery (former Palais Schulenburg), the building of the Ministry of Finance and the Kaiserhof grand hotel built in 1875.

== Wilhelmplatz in the 18th century ==
=== Location of the Square ===
The square was originally laid out in 1721 over the course of the Friedrichstadt expansion and obtained the name Wilhelmplatz in 1749, after King Frederick William I of Prussia. Engineer and chairman of the state building commission Christian Reinhold von Derschau led the project. He was advised by the King's senior and court building directors, Johann Phillipp Gerlach and Johann Friedrich Grael, respectively, who were in charge of the architectural design. Under their influence, the building commission decided on mandatory, narrowly defined guidelines so that the city would give off a harmonious, integrated feel.

Initially, the plan was to lay out the streets in a traditional grid formation. Yet, from 1732 onward, plans focused themselves around three primary north–south throughways that each radiated from the same circular public space, known as the Rondell (today: Mehringplatz). These major streets would later come to be known as Wilhelmstraße, Friedrichstraße and Lindenstraße. According to a royal patent from July 29, 1734, the location of a large square on Wilhelmstraße was also among the construction projects discussed.

In 1737, for the first time, a Plan of the Royal Capital of Berlin demarcates a public square located in the northern third of the street (as it was drawn until the 19th century) opening up from its eastern side. The square came to be known as Wilhelms-Markt, a name it carried until 1749, when it was christened Wilhelmsplatz. The origin of its name is the Prussian "Soldier King" Frederick William I, who had an especially heavy influence on the architecture and expansion of the northern part of Wilhelmstraße.

Early plans already dictated a wide connection from the east side of the square to Mohrenstraße, "Am Wilhelmplatz", later (mid-1800s) to be renamed Zietenplatz. Still, many historical maps show Zietenplatz simply as either a part of Wilhemplatz or Mohrenstraße. It wasn't until the early 20th century that they finally lengthened Mohrenstraße to Wilhelmstraße past Wilhelmplatz and Zietenplatz.

=== Development on the Square ===
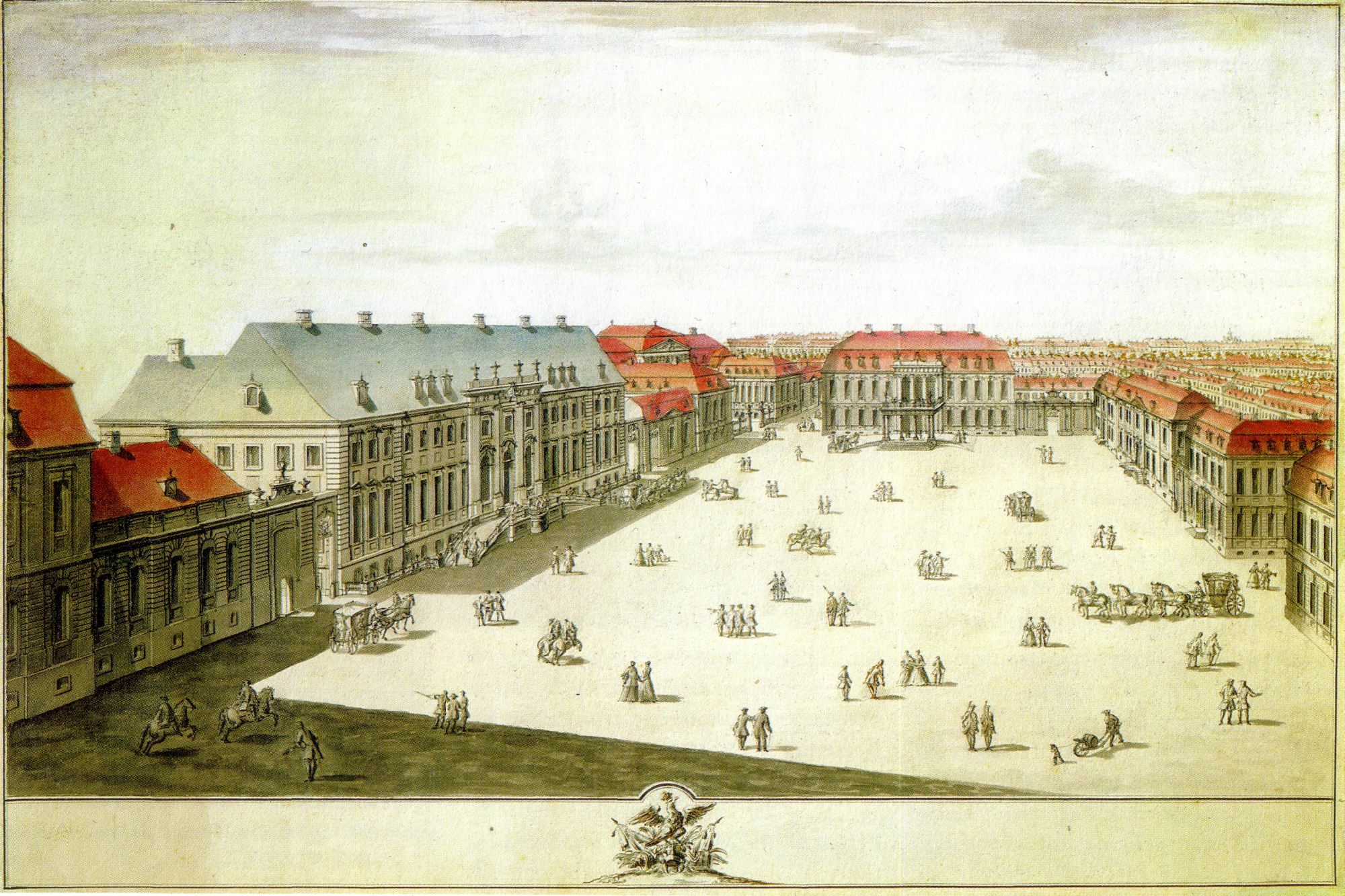
Wilhelmplatz, Pen and ink by C.H. Horst, around 1733

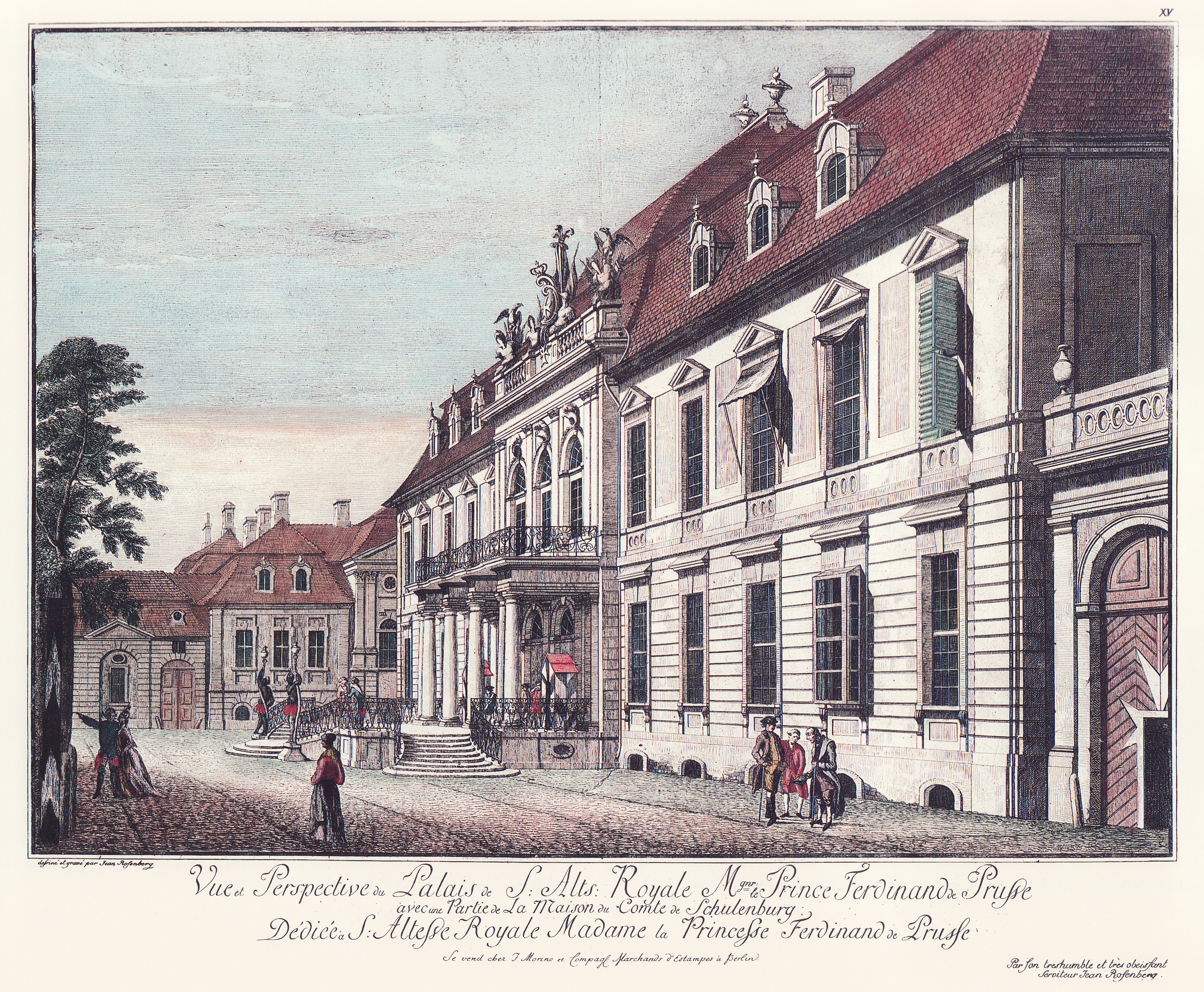
Front of the Ordenspalais; the left annex of the Palais Schulenburg (old Imperial Chancellory) in the background; engraving by Johann Georg Rosenberg, around 1785

Going back to a wish of Frederick William I's, thirty large, aristocratic townhouses were built along northern Wilhelmstraße and on Wilhelmplatz itself starting around the 1730s. These functioned as lodging for the military, representatives of the court, and other state authorities. The private contractors were each allocated extremely valuable pieces of land free and the state even subsidized a portion of the construction. In available literature, however, there is still disagreement as to whether these contractors saw this endeavor as a worthwhile honor or rather as a financial burden that they would have rather withdrawn from. In any case, they saw themselves bound by duty to take part in the expansion of Friedrichstadt.

One of the earlier construction plans recorded is a pen and ink drawing (right) stemming from architect C.H. Horst in the year 1733. It's clear to see from the drawing that the particularly magnificent townhouses were in the works from the very beginning. And with the exception of the townhouse located in the northeast corner of the square, all of these rendered structures were at some point erected (most in the mid-1730s).

The newly featured area was dominated by Gerlach and Horst's (believed to be their work) Palais Marschall on the square's west side (No. 78), which also served as focal point of the old Mohrenstraße. The widening of the throughway to Wilhelmplatz – later Zietenplatz – was clearly intentionally conceived so as to allow a sweeping view of the grandiose structure as far as one ventured eastward.

The next building over, Palais Schulenburg at Wilhelmstraße 77, was installed by architect Carl Friedrich Richter. While Friedrichstadt was otherwise characterized by a continuous house facade lining its streets and squares, central buildings were allowed forecourts flanked by peripheral wings of the house. However, in taking the Mohrenstraße into account during the construction of the neighboring Palais Marschall, this ensured that Palais Schulenburg was crowded into the northwest corner of Wilhelmplatz so that no room remained for any court. Beginning in 1878, the Palais Schulenburg became the official seat of the Imperial Chancellor.

As with most property on the west of Wilhelmstraße between Unter den Linden and Leipziger Straße, both the Palais Marschall and the Palais Schulenburg possessed sprawling gardens that stretched west to the level of today's Ebertstraße. They were fashioned in the style of a baroque decorative garden, but also reaped plentiful fruit and vegetables for sale on the Berlin markets. After the surrounding buildings were repurposed for government use in the 19th century, this area became known as the "Ministergärten".

The first building erected (in 1737 for General Major Karl Ludwig Truchsess von Waldburg) was the Ordenspalais, serving as the seat of the Order of Saint John (Johanniterorden) on the northern side of the square. The Order had taken over the completion of its construction after the premature death of its original developer.

On the northern end of Wilhelmstraße it became apparent that there weren't enough private contractors for the property available. Frederick William I had to come to grips with the fact that, in order to populate the area, some corporations, guilds, state institutions and societies would need to resettle themselves from the southern part of the street, where they normally frequented. Accordingly, a gold and silver manufacturer set up shop in the southwest corner of Wilhelmplatz at Wilhelmstraße 79, which had been built according to Gerlach's plans from 1735 to 1737. This particular manufacturer was also in possession of the Great Military Orphanage in Potsdam, which would be financed by this new endeavor. An additional building on the south side (No. 2) belonged to the same proprietors. As for No. 79, from 1869 to 1876, it was expanded to include the neighboring property (No. 80) and the property toward Voßstraße (No. 35). This expansion accommodated the Prussian Minister of Trade and, beginning in 1878, the Minister of Public Works as well. During the Weimar Republic and Third Reich, the Reich's transportation ministry was located there for a time as well as a part of the train administration.

To note, it had been forbidden since 1727 for Jews in the city to acquire houses. Despite the law, the Jewish community was allotted a property, the southernmost corner lot on Wilhelmstraße (Wilhelmplatz 1), to erect their own building. The following three years passed without any progress, however, due to the dire financial circumstances of the group. Between 1761 and 1764, with special allowance from the King Frederick II, Veitel Heine Ephraim, head of the Jewish community, acquired both No. 1 and the factory building No. 2 on the south side as private property as well as the earlier mentioned silver and gold manufacturer through emphyteusis.

=== Prussian Military Statues ===
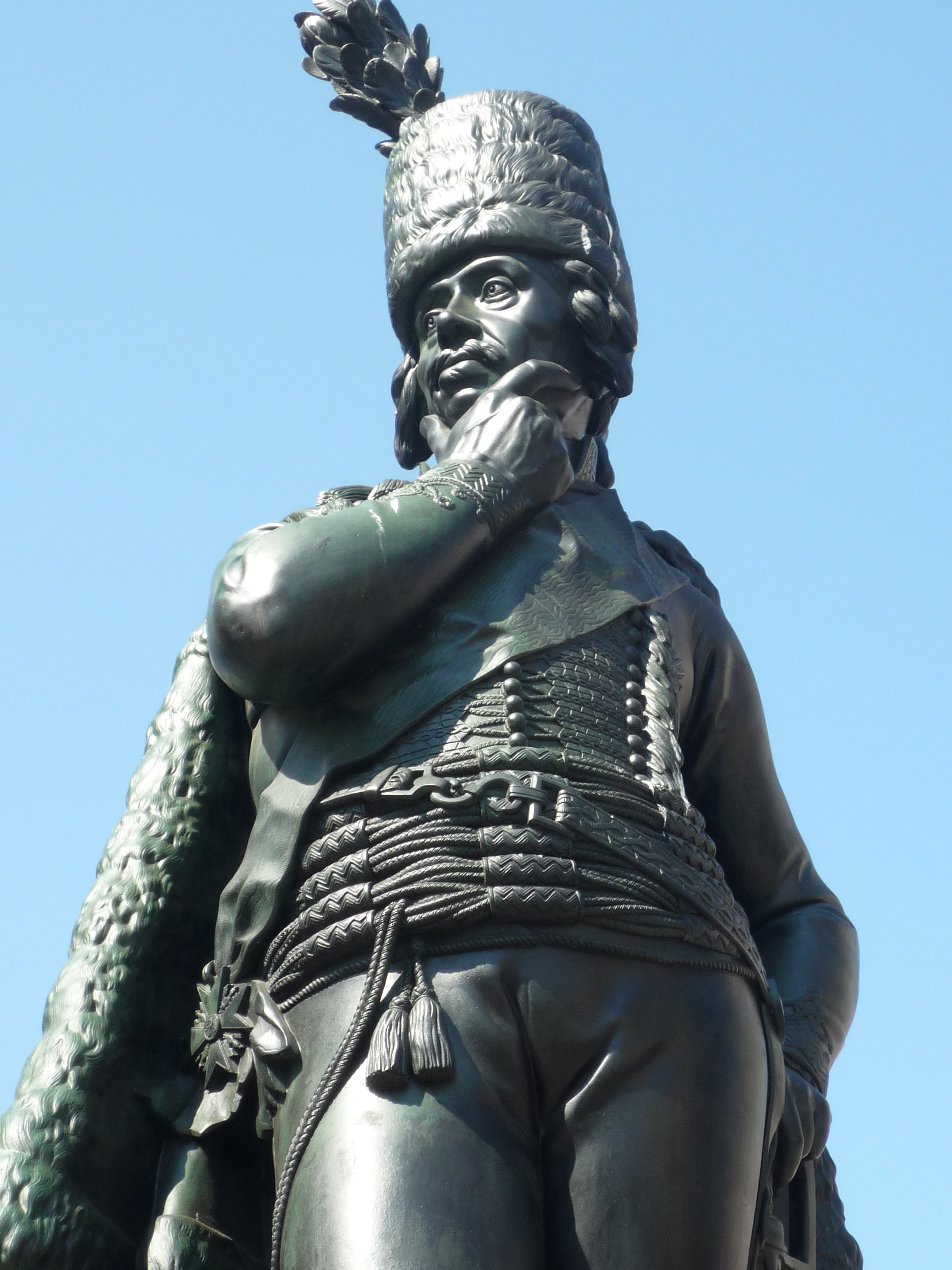
Bronze Statue of General Hans Joachim von Zieten

After the end of the Seven Years' War in 1763, a plan was developed to erect statues of those generals who had fallen in battle. From this idea, originated the first four free-standing marble statues of General Field Marshal Kurt Christoph Graf von Schwerin (Sculptors: François Gaspard Adam and Sigisbert François Michel, 1769), General Field Marshal Hans Karl von Winterfeldt (Johann David Räntz and Johann Lorenz Wilhelm Räntz, 1777), General Friedrich Wilhelm von Seydlitz (Jean-Pierre-Antoine Tassaert, 1781) and General Field Marshal James Keith (Jean-Pierre Antoine Tassaert, 1786). They depicted the military in a rather conventional form. Schwerin and Winterfeldt posed in an antique manner with Roman clothing, while Seydlitz and Keith wore contemporary uniforms.

In the years 1794 and 1828, 2 further statues were put into place, which had originally been determined for other places in Berlin. The two pieces, done by notable Berlin sculptor Johann Gottfried Schadow, depicted Hans Joachim von Zieten and Leopold I, the prince of Anhalt-Dessau, nicknamed "Alter Dessauer". The statue of Zieten was supposed to be erected on Donhöffplatz (also in Mitte, though no longer there today), while the memorial for the prince had already stood since 1800 on the southwest corner of the Lustgarten. Leopold I was then only moved when both areas were redesigned under the supervision of Karl Friedrich Schinkel. Together, the six sculptures overlooked the square for more than a century.

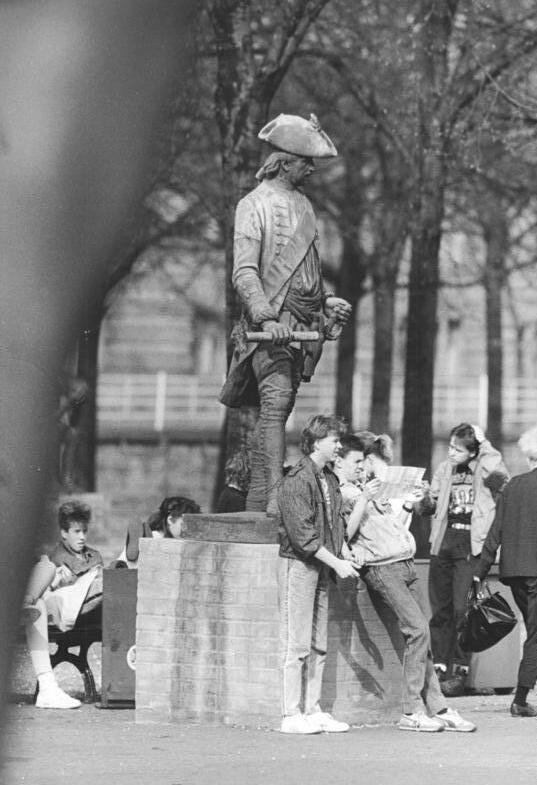
East Berlin, 1988

Based on advice from Christian Daniel Rauch regarding the vulnerability of the materials, the statues were replaced with bronze copies made by August Kiß in 1857. That is, all but Schwerin and Winterfeldt. Kiß designed these completely new and rid them of their antique appearances. The originals, after moving from place to place, eventually found a home in 1904 in the small dome hall at the Bode Museum.

Though both the marble originals and the bronze versions survived World War II, they were hidden from view of the public for decades in different depots. It wasn't until a Prussian Renaissance in 1980s East Germany when a discussion was started about potentially redisplaying them. On the occasion of the 750th anniversary of Berlin in January 1987 the marble originals were once again transported to the Bode Museum, while the bronze versions were placed in front of the Altes Museum in the Lustgarten. The bronze statues have since been stored away again.

After the turn of the millennium, at the urging of the Berlin Schadow Society, it was planned to once again place the statues at or near their historical locations. The bronze copies of the memorials depicting Zieten and Anhalt-Dessau were erected on U-Bahn Island on the lateral axis of the former Wilhelmplatze in 2003 and 2005, respectively. The other four bronze statues found a home in September 2009 on the neighboring Zietenplatz, after its construction, begun in 2005, was finished. As of 2011, the statues (as a complete set) are considered to be under protection of historic buildings and monuments.

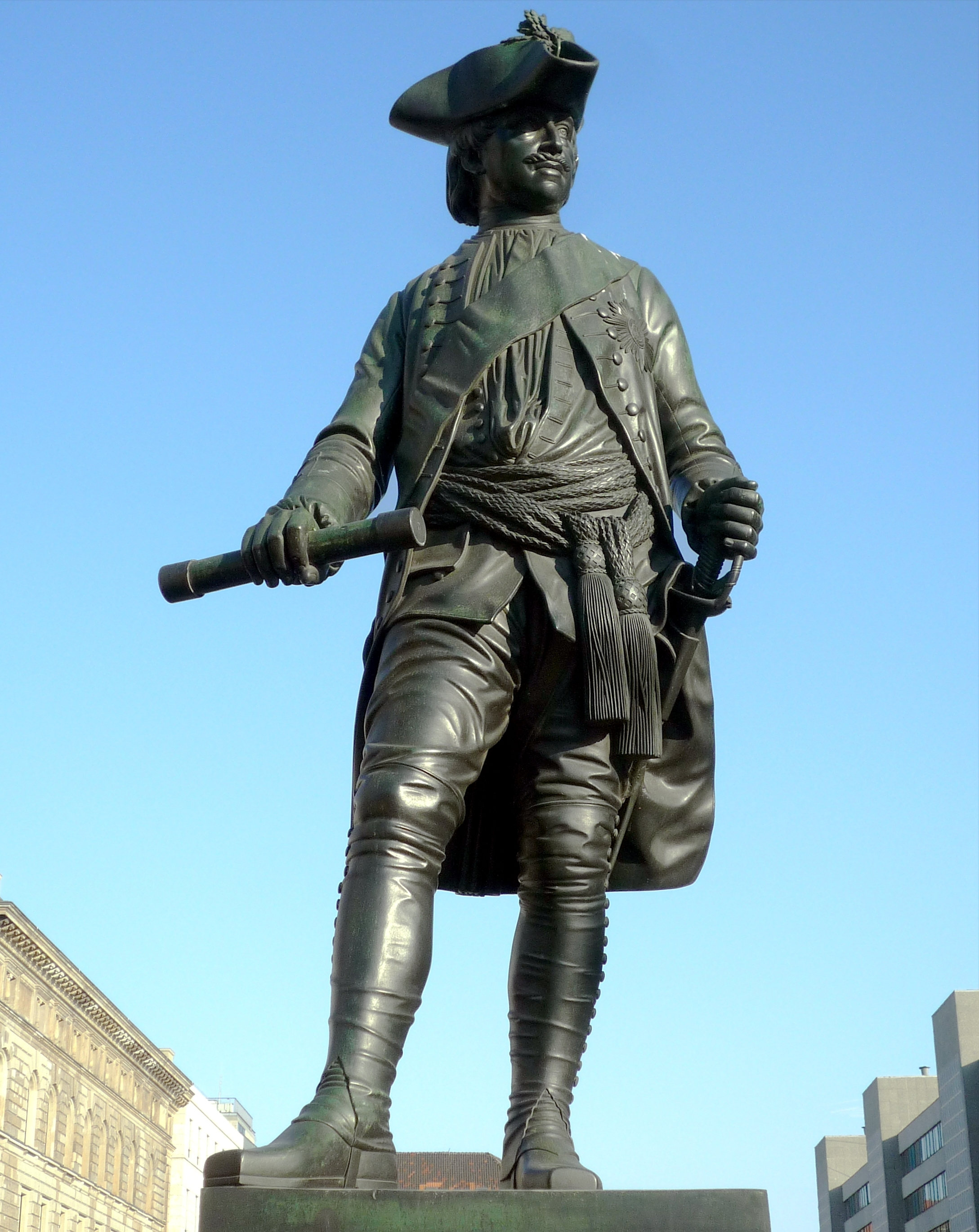
Bronze Statue of Leopold I, Prince of Anhalt-Dessau

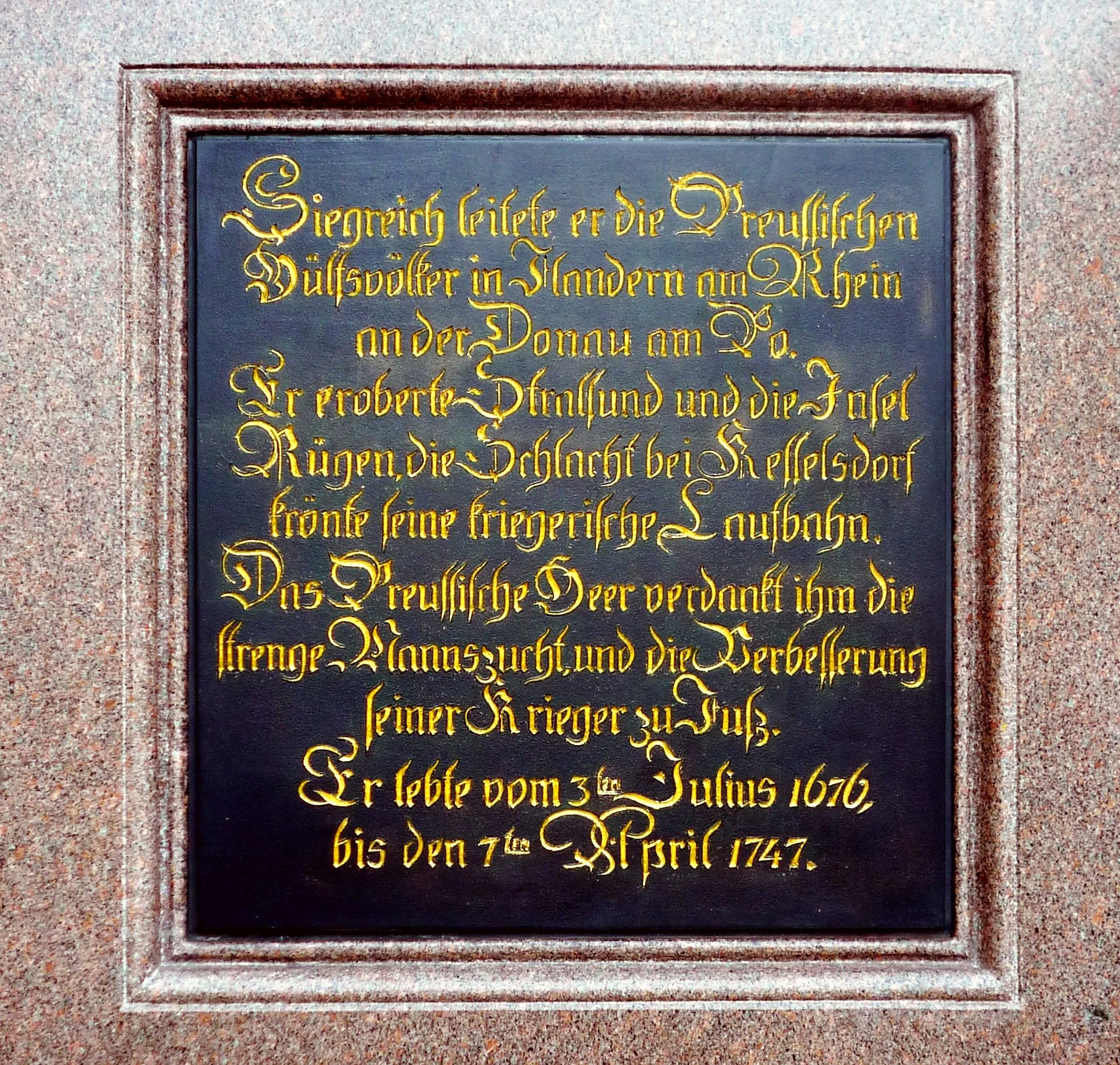
Leopold I Memorial, pedestal engraving based on design from Schadow

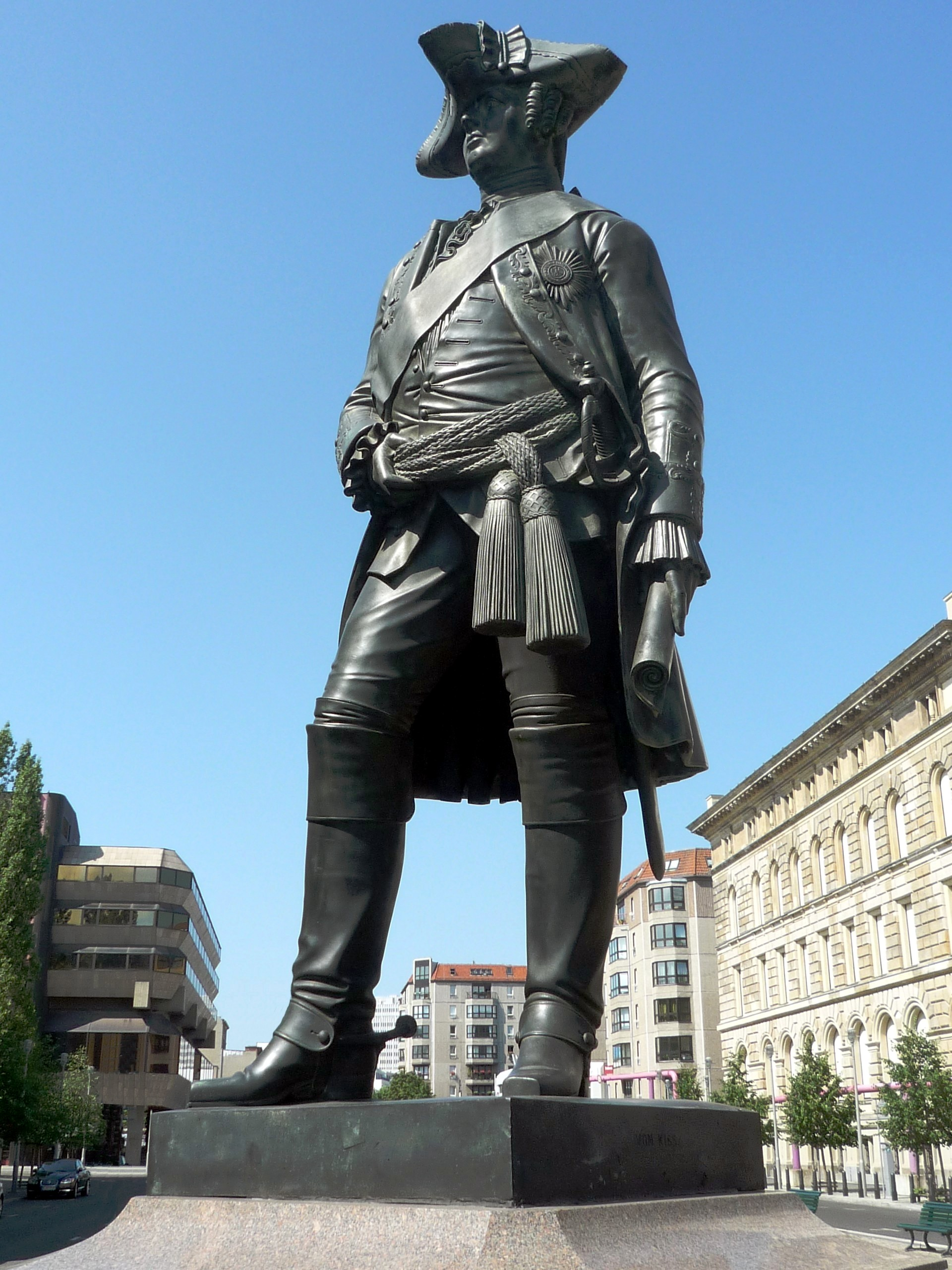
Bronze statue of General Field Marshal Hans Karl von Winterfeldt

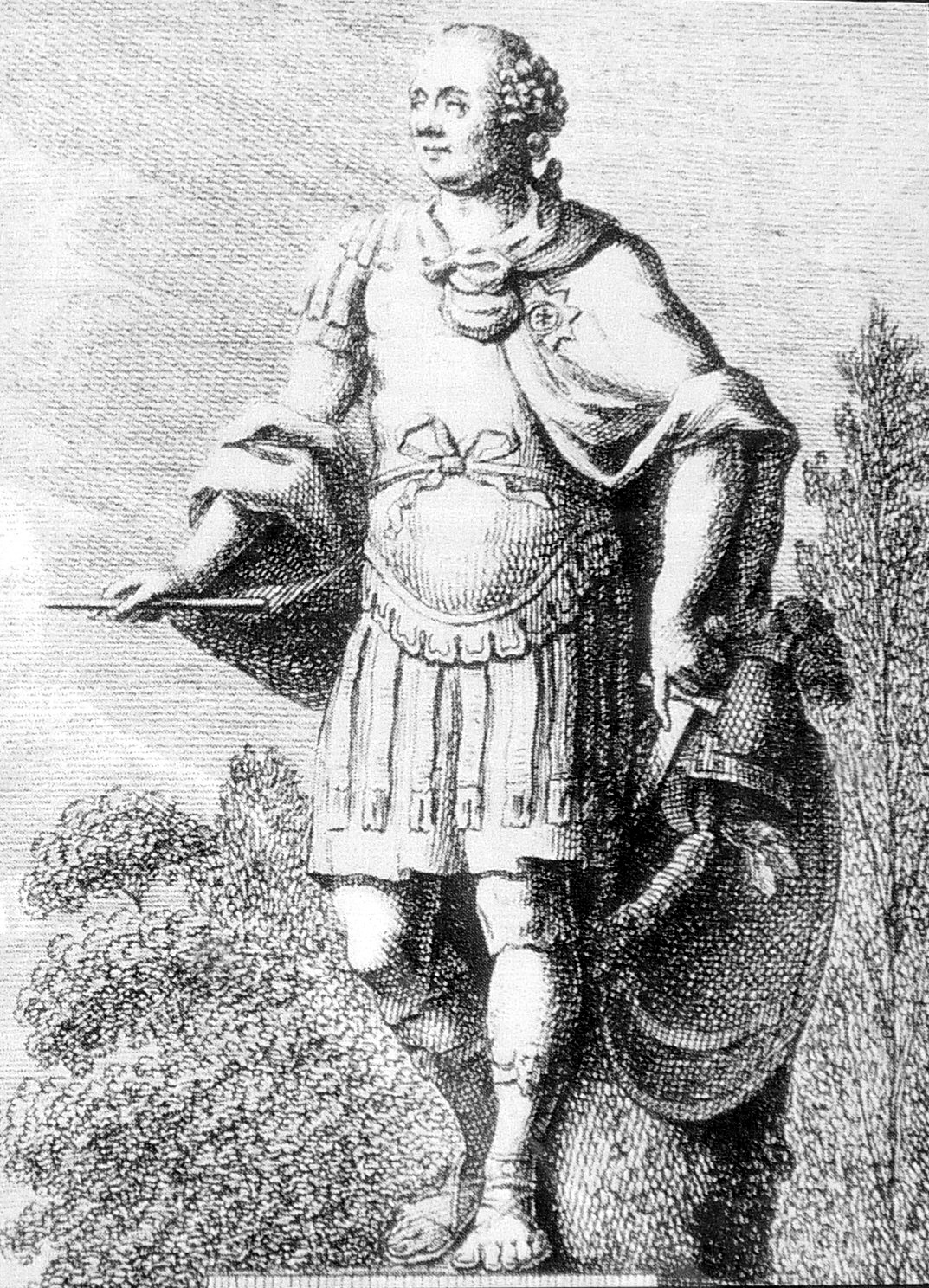
Marble statue of Winterfeldt (1777) depicted on copper (1778)

== Wilhelmplatz until 1871 ==
=== Revamp by Schinkel & new residents ===
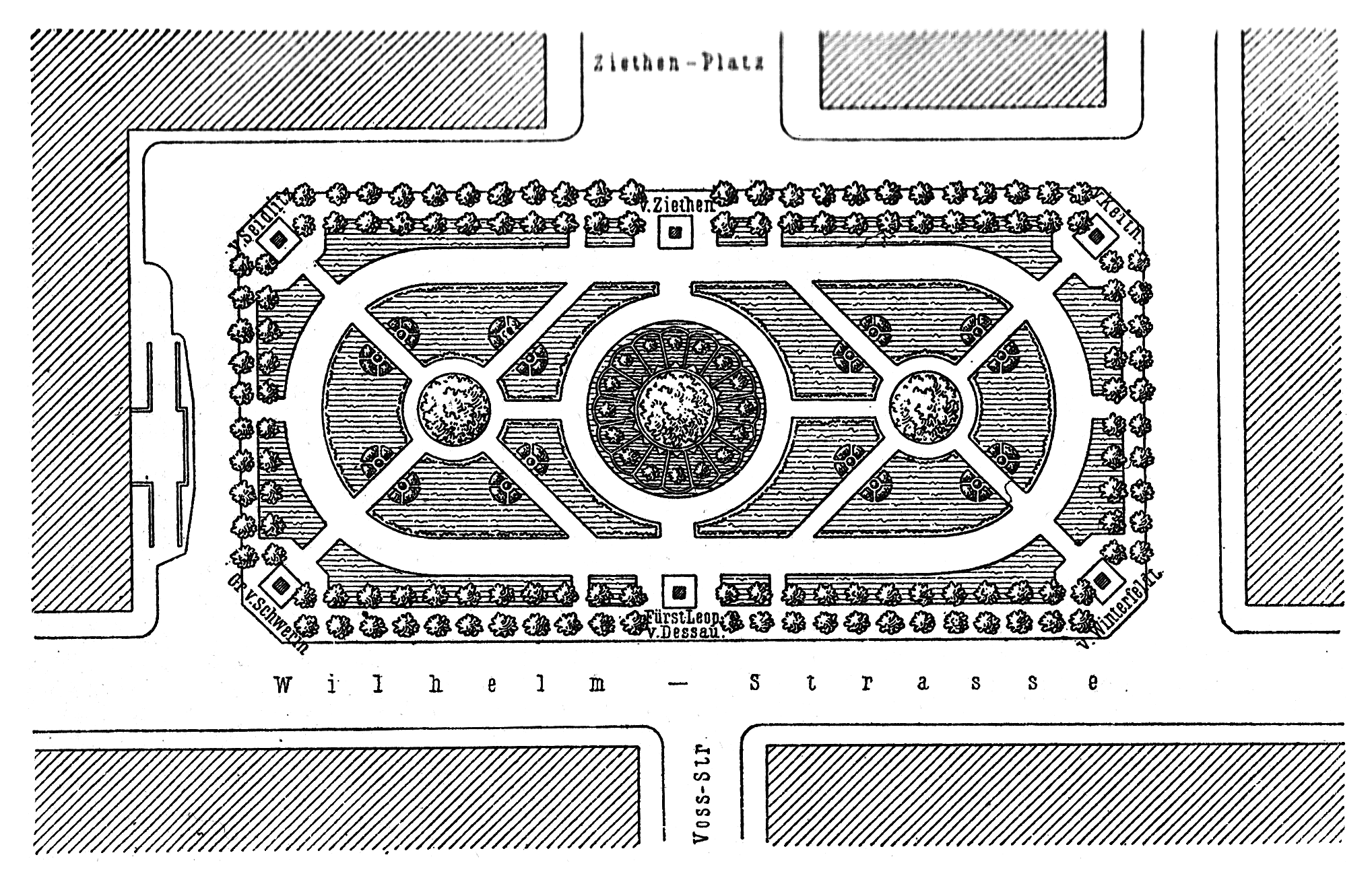
Berlin Wilhelmplatz planned layout

In 1826, Schinkel submitted his suggestion to move the position of the Leopold I Memorial as a part of the largest yet transfiguration of the square under his supervision. The other statues were also allocated new locations along the diagonals and lateral axes of the square. Besides these changes, he graced the surface of the square with greenery, a lawn dotted with lime trees and encircled by an oval walking path, which traced the borders of the square. Altogether, the new upgrades gave the space the appearance of a park.

Until the end of the 19th century, the development around the edge of the square was in places replaced, in part by the expansion of existing buildings, in part by replacement with newer, larger ones. With each owner and/or resident change at a Stadtpalais, often came a name change of the residence itself.

For a short time in the 1790s the Palais Schulenburg belonged to Sophie von Dönhoff, the morganatic wife of King Frederick William II before falling into possession of Anton Radziwill in 1796, at which point it became known as "Palais Radziwill". It was seized by troops of the French Empire in 1806 and temporarily served as the seat of Napoleon's town major during the occupation. In the following decades, Radziwiłł held one of the leading Berlin salons here and, as a passionate admirer of Johann Wolfgang von Goethe, on May 24, 1820, made his home the site of one of the first performances of Faust I. Due to the Catholicism of the landlords in Protestant Prussia, such activities caused quite a stir and a healthy dose of societal disapproval. In 1869 the Kingdom of Prussia purchased Prince Radziwiłł's palais on initiative of Otto von Bismarck. The building was refinanced with the war reparations paid by the French Third Republic after the Franco-Prussian War and inaugurated as the chancellery of the new German Empire with the 1878 Berlin Congress.

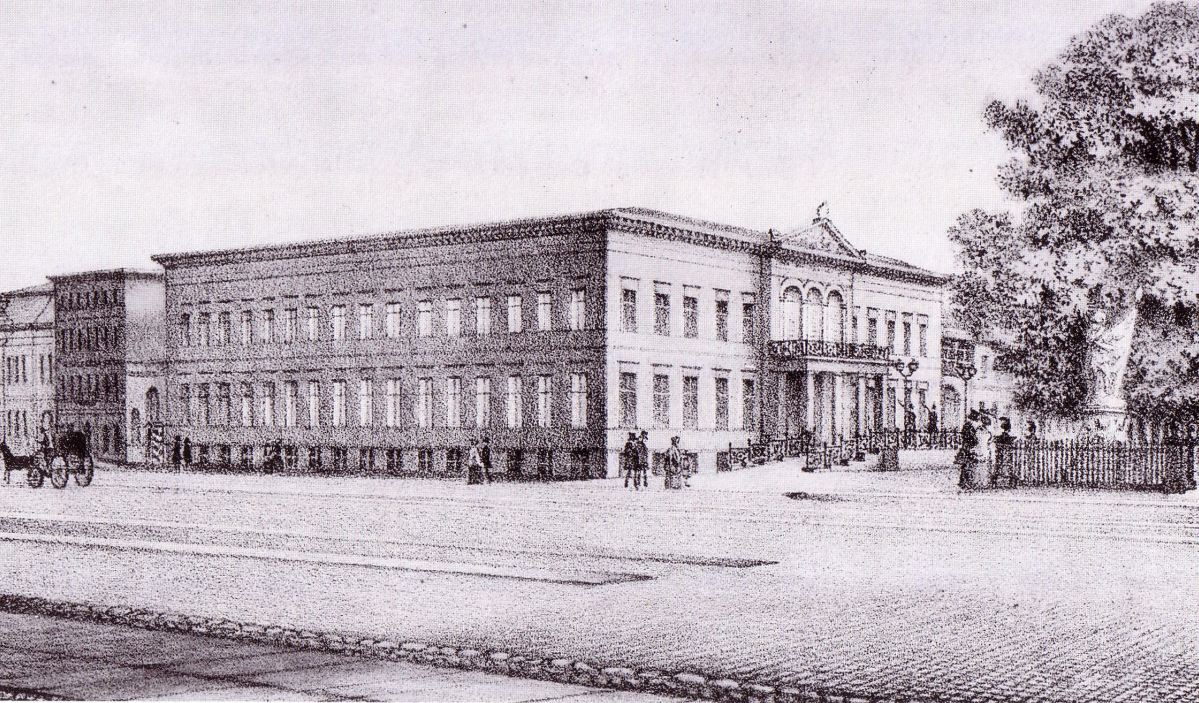
Berlin, Wilhelmplatz, Ordenspalais, around 1830

With the dissolution of the Order of Saint John (Bailiwick of Brandenburg) during the Prussian Reform Movement, the state took ownership of the Ordenspalais in 1811. King Frederick William III gave it to his third son, Prince Charles, on the occasion of his engagement in 1826. Simultaneously, it was newly named "Palais Prinz Karl" with the new number Wilhelmplatz 8/9. Karl had the inside of baroque building remodeled by Friedrich August Stüler, who also redid the outside in a Neoclassical style and erected an annex to the building's right, all using Schinkel's 1827-1828 plans as a foundation. Until his death in 1865, Stüler was responsible for the renovations of a whole row of houses on Wilhelmstraße.

The former Palais Marschall, which had already seen its owner switch multiple times during the 18th century, was acquired in 1800 by the rather clandestine Minister of Foreign Affairs Otto Carl Friedrich von Voß. It was henceforth known as Palais Voß. After their wedding, from 1811 to 1814, Ludwig Achim von Arnim and Bettina von Arnim lived in a garden house belonging to the property. In a letter to Goethe, the latter wrote of her living situation: "Ich wohne hier in einem Paradies!" ("I live here in paradise!")

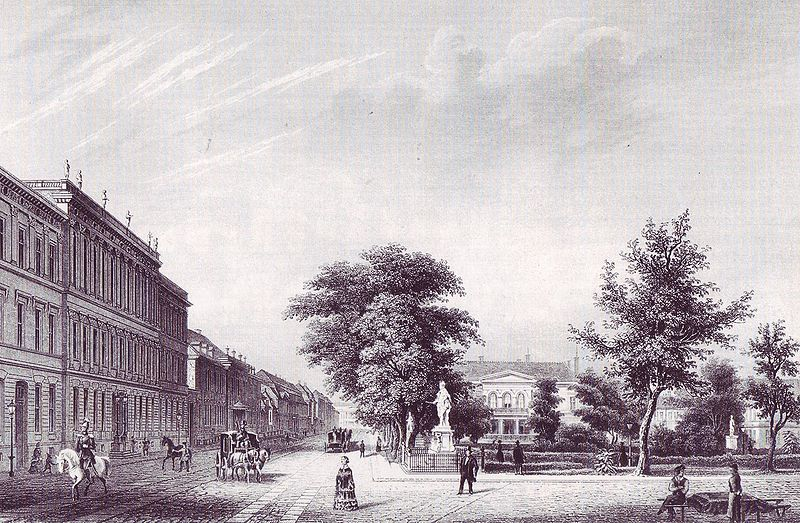
An engraving of Wilhelmplatz in Berlin from 1850.

=== The Beginning of the Government Quarter on Wilhelmstraße ===
By the end of the 18th century, it was already becoming clear that that Prussian nobility was often not financially capable of long-term maintenance of the many impressive Palais along the northern Wilhelmstraße. As a result, the norm became individual sales to representatives of the emergent citizenry, who used the buildings primarily for economic purposes such as manufacturing, publishing and renting. However, in the surrounding area, smaller parcels were transformed into the first true common houses.

A countermovement was born in the 1790s, in which the state of Prussia began to acquire property and buildings along Wilhelmstraße to use for public purposes. The goal of these actions was to preserve Wilhelmplatz and the surrounding area's image as the window into aristocratic Prussian tradition. The administrative and spatial separation from court and government that had settled in during the second half of the 18th century was reinforced after the coalition's victory in the German Campaign of 1813. Independent ministries and authorities began to establish themselves. It was important that these separate organizations remained in close contact with one another so, over the course of the 19th century, a Prussian (then Imperial German) government quarter began to form under the metonym "Wilhelmstraße". Envoys of German and foreign states alike soon followed, renting free apartments in the immediate area. For example, in the 1840s, envoys from Belgium, Mecklenburg-Strelitz and Württemberg all had property on Wilhelmplatz.

The first house on Wilhelmplatz that fulfilled Prussian government functions was Ordenspalais. Beginning in 1817, the building housed departments of the military staff and in 1820 additional offices for the Ministry of Foreign Affairs. Both authorities had to move in 1827 when Prinz Karl was conveyed the Palais. Subsequently, the Foreign Affairs Ministry moved to the southernmost corner building (Wilhelmstraße 61/Wilhelmplatz 1) acquired by the heirs to Ephraim.

In 1844, the Prussian state also took over the gold and silver manufacturer's greatly altered building (production had taken place in a newly added backyard annex) at Wilhelmstraße 79. The Ministry of Trade, Industry and Public Works moved in four years later. Another story was added in 1854/55 when Stüler reconstructed it once more.

== Wilhelmplatz in the German Empire ==
=== New government buildings ===
After the German Empire was founded in 1871, Wilhelmstraße found itself at the political center of a European superpower. As the government transitioned, existing Prussian offices, committees and authorities were transfigured and new ones were established, creating a sudden need for representative office buildings. The construction of living and office space for secretaries and clerks also contributed to the building boom on Wilhelmplatz. As a result, the surroundings took on a mundane, business-like air that left no room for local shops or restaurants. Wilhelmplatz would remain this way for some time, remaining one of the few central places in Berlin with no cafés well into the time of the national socialist regime.

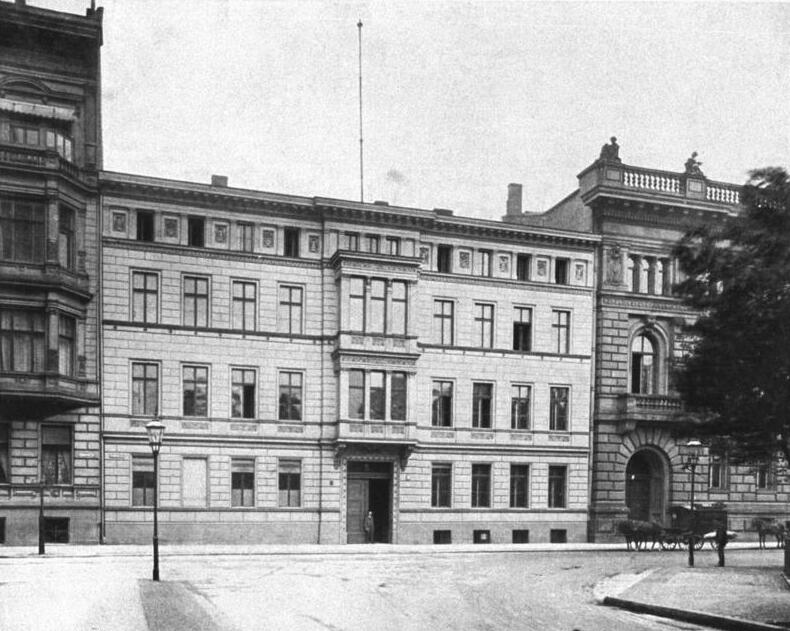
Seat of the Imperial Insurance Institution at Wilhelmplatz 2, around 1890 before the reconstruction

Founded as the Institution of the North German Confederation in 1870, the newly created Ministry of Foreign Affairs temporarily settled in on the south side of Wilhelmplatz. In doing so, it was able to take over the corner building Wilhelmstraße 61/Wilhelmplatz 1, which had been used in the past by its Prussian counterpart. Officials were moved in after the demolition and reconstruction of the building was completed in 1877 according to plans by Wilhelm Neumann, carried out by Richard Wolffenstein. Modelling its outer form on Palazzo Strozzi in Florence, the architects used an otherwise eclectic style, connecting ornamental elements of the Renaissance with classicism. At the same time, the neighboring Wilhelmplatz 2, acquired in 1873, had its interior remodeled and joined to the No. 1.

In 1882, after the Foreign Affairs Ministry moved from the southern corner to the northern side of the square (No. 75/76), the corner building was occupied by the Imperial Treasury, the highest financial authority in the land as of 1879. Next door to the east in Wilhelmplatz 2, the Imperial Insurance Institution had its seat from 1887 to 1894 until the Treasury needed to expand, forcing them out. In 1909, No. 2 was finally redone so that it completely optically matched No. 1. Though, before this project was completed, the compound had already expanded (in 1904) to include Wilhelmstraße 60 to the south.

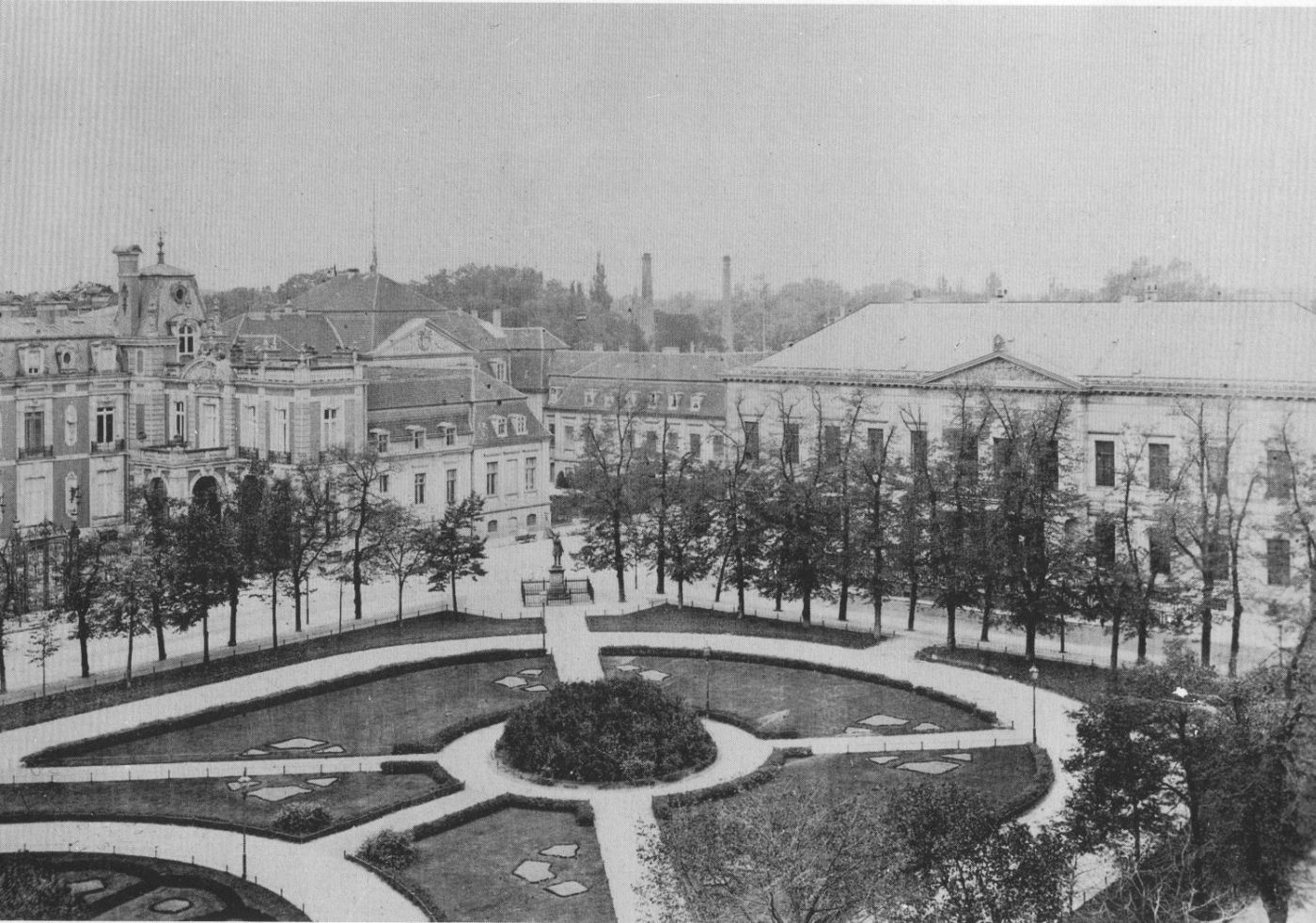
Wilhelmplatz before 1906: Looking NW with Reich Chancellory center, Palais Pleß (1913/1914 torn down) left, Palais Prinz Leopold (Ordenspalais) right

On the other side of the street, long time occupant Ministry of Trade, Industry and Public Works also began to extend its reach beyond its original 1848 tenancy in the former gold and silver manufacturer's building (No. 79). Two annexes at Wilhemstraße 80 and the newly constructed Voßstraße 35 were also added to the complex in 1869/1870 and 1875/1876, respectively. In 1878, this block of buildings became the seat of the newly separated (from Trade and Industry) Ministry of Public Works, which was responsible for building construction and railroads above all. The ministry also incorporated a couple buildings on Leipzigerstraße (No. 125) and Voßstraße (No. 34) from 1892 to 1894 and 1892 to 1908, respectively.

The greatest influence on the continued development of the area came from Chancellor Otto von Bismarck's decision regarding the official residence of the chancellory. Instead of moving into the newly erected building at Wilhelmstraße 74 (1872-1874) that Neumann designed specifically for this purpose, Bismarck chose the former Palais Radziwill (Wilhelmstraße 77) on the northwestern corner of Wilhelmplatz. Bismarck had pursued the purchase of the building to prevent private investors from securing housing on Wilhelmstraße. The executive's ever expanding need for space needed to be within walking distance of all the already established institutions. An 1874 law stipulated that the exorbitantly high price of two million marks would be covered with French reparation payments from the Franco-Prussian War. The building was quasi-christened for its new purpose in June and July 1878 when the Congress of Berlin took place within its walls.

=== Other changes ===
Aside from the growth of the government district, three urban developments radically changed the appearance of Wilhelmplatz between 1871 and 1914 more than anything.

In 1871, the Deutsche Baugesellschaft (German Construction Company) came into possession of the buildings and land of the Palais Voß. Out of speculative reasons, they developed a plan to tear down the Palais and make the grounds into a cul-de-sac, which would be accessible to Königgrätzer Straße, today's Ebertstraße. The parcels, which would lie on both sides of two new trafficked arteries of the city would be sold at a handsome profit to investors, who could build shop buildings there. The newly formed Voßstraße was named after its previous owner and was originally private. It ran up against the lateral axis of Wilhelmplatz, connecting with Zietenplatz and Mohrenstraße on a west–east axis between Königgrätzer Straße and Hausvogteiplatz. At the beginning of the 20th century, this axis was closed for road traffic.

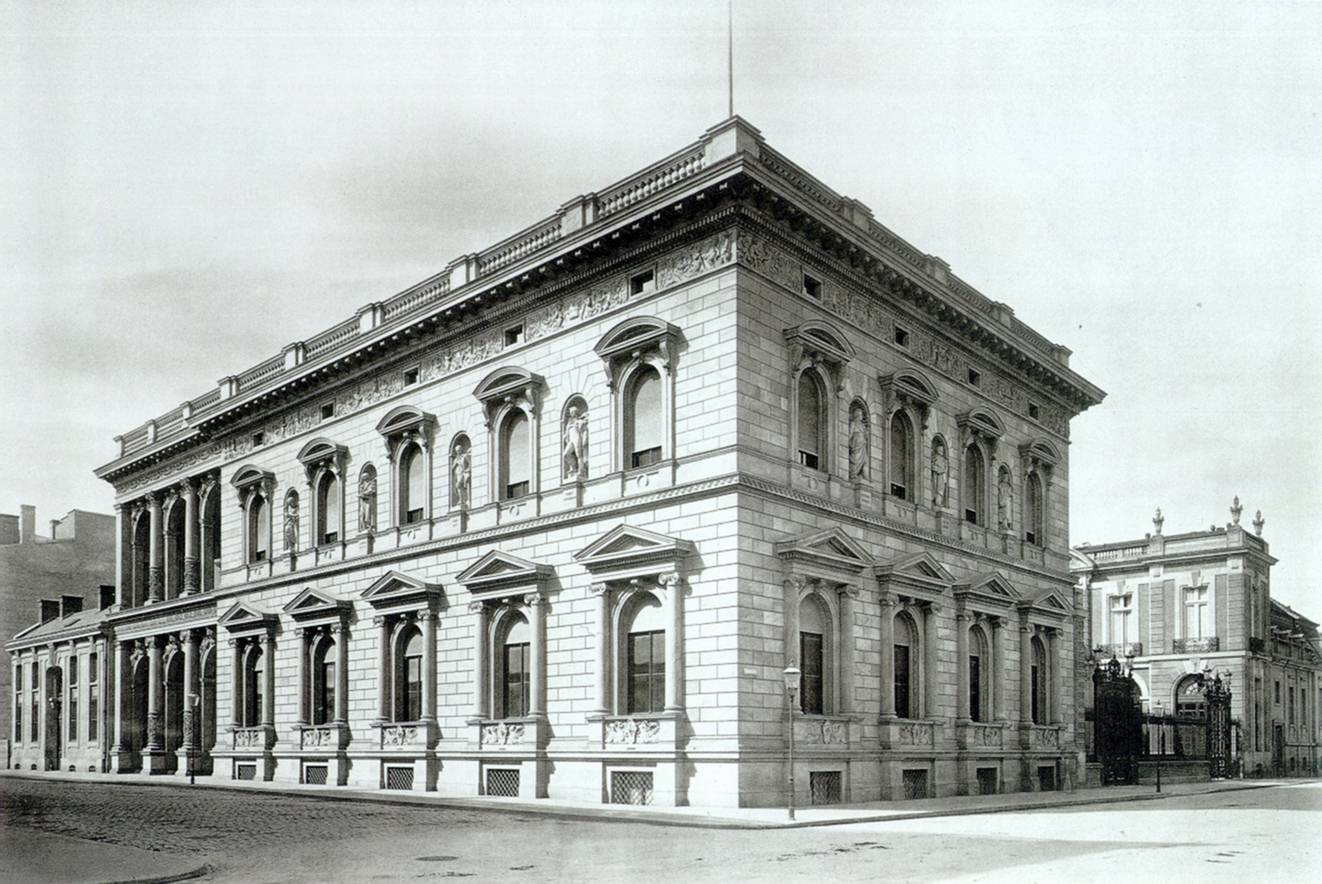
Palais Borsig on the corner of Voßstraße (left) and Wilhelmstraße, around 1881

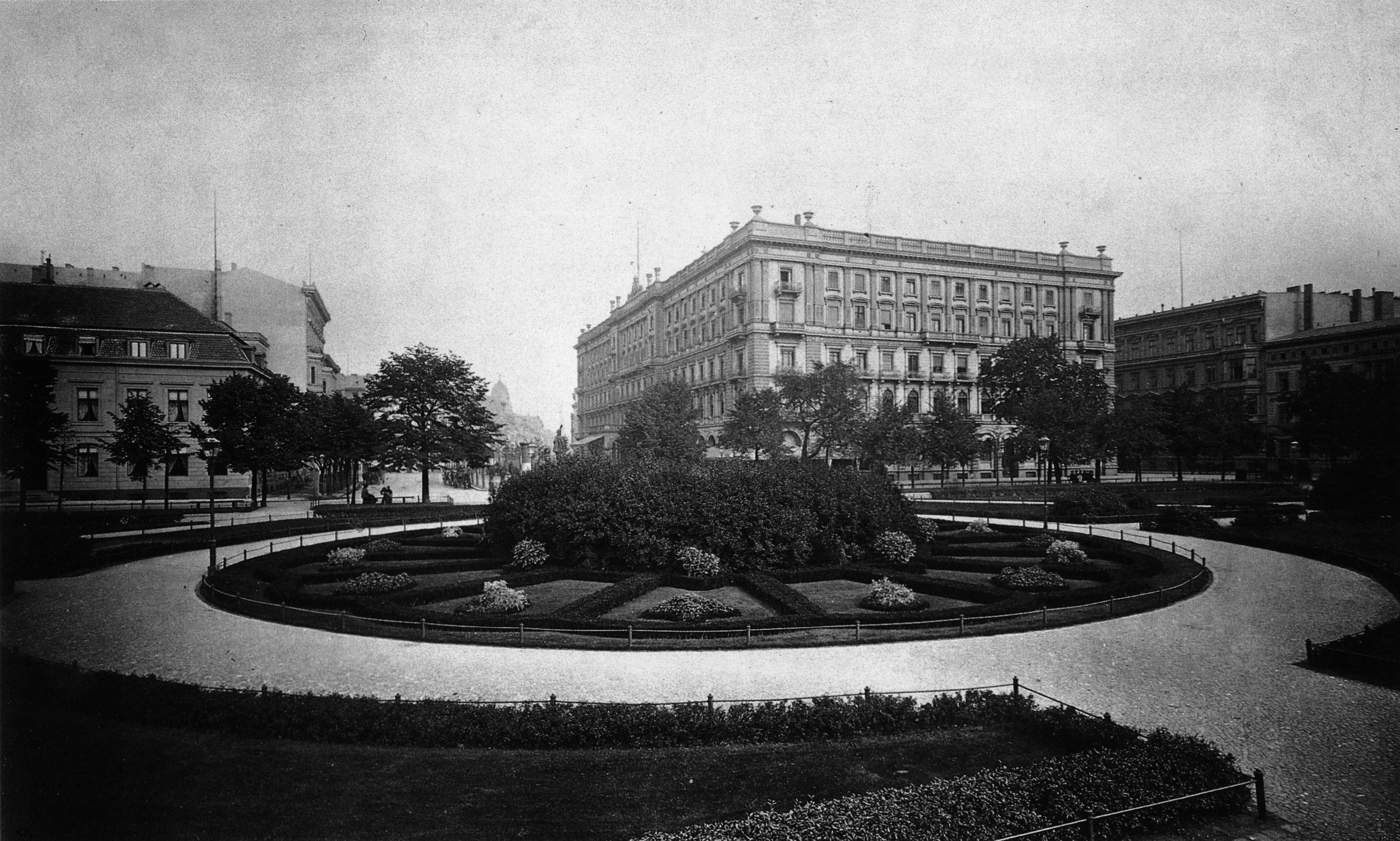
Wilhelmplatz and Kaiserhof hotel, 1886

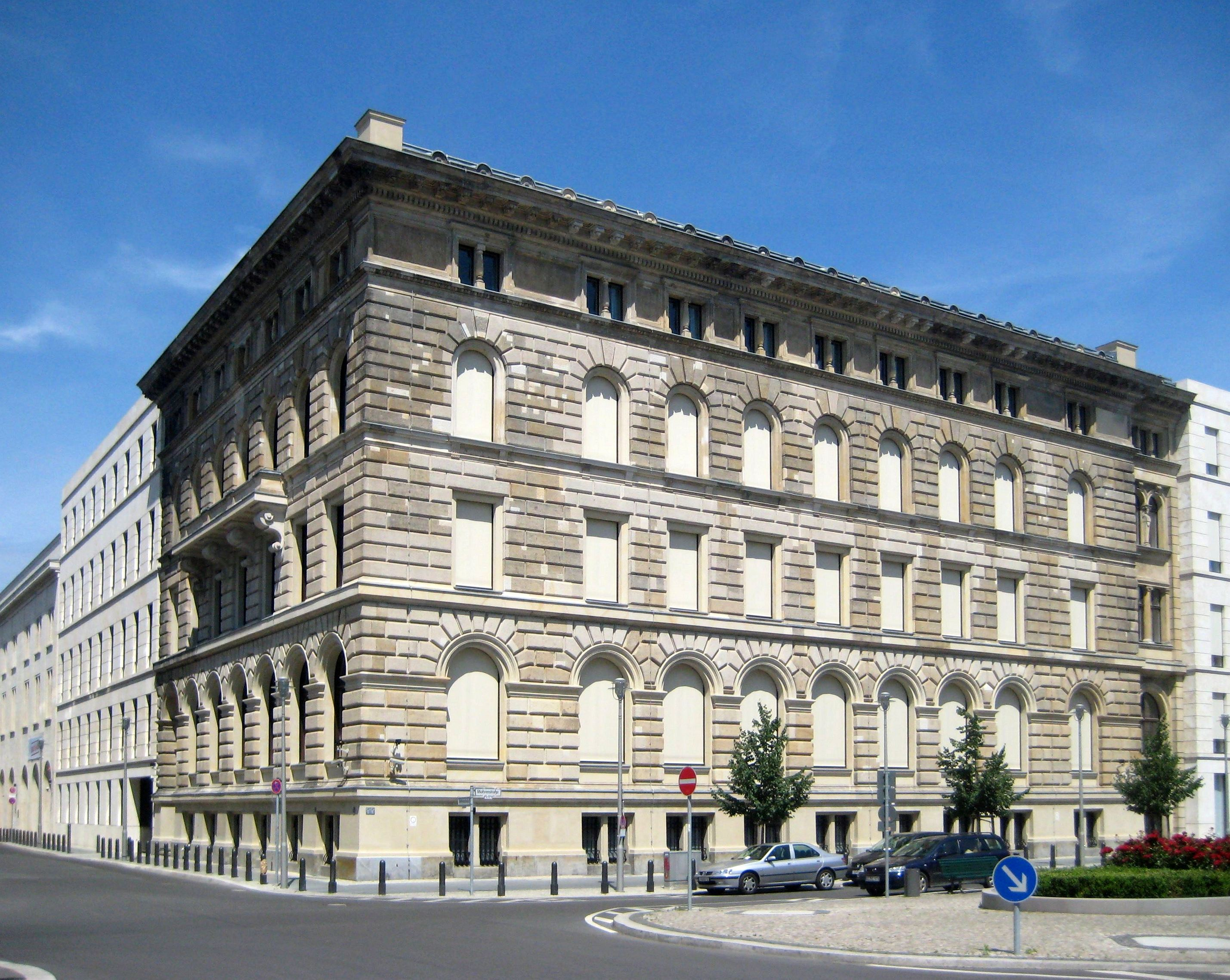
Ritterschaftsdirektion, 2009

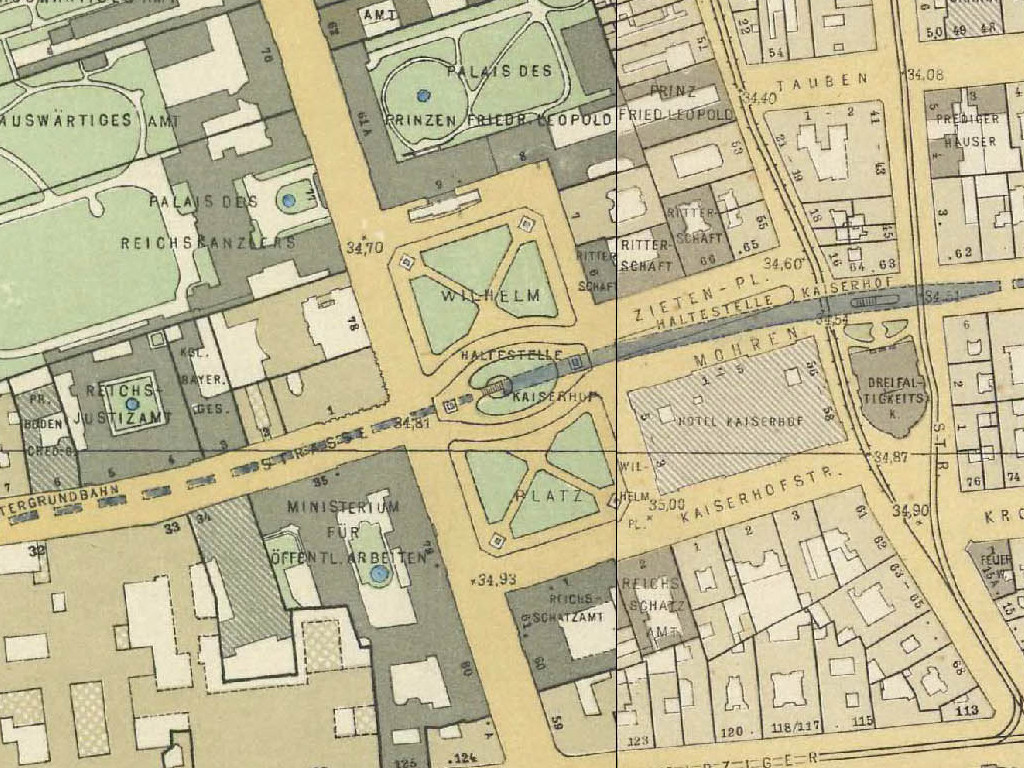
Map, 1910

== Third Reich ==
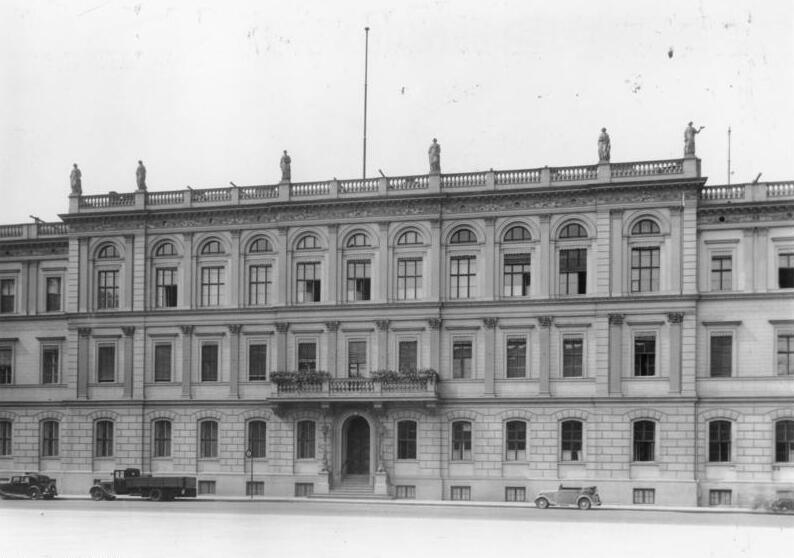
Reich Ministry of Transport in the southwest corner of Wilhelmplatz, August 1937

During the Nazi era, the Ordenspalais became the seat of the Ministry of Public Enlightenment and Propaganda and Adolf Hitler commissioned Albert Speer to construct the new Reich Chancellery across the square. Buildings around the square were all heavily damaged by bombings in World War II and most were destroyed. On 18 August 1950 Wilhelmplatz was renamed by East Berlin authorities as Thälmannplatz, for Ernst Thälmann. In the 1980s, apartment complexes were built over the square.
