= Anton-Wilhelm-Amo-Straße =

Street in Berlin, Germany

- Anton-Wilhelm-Amo-Strasse
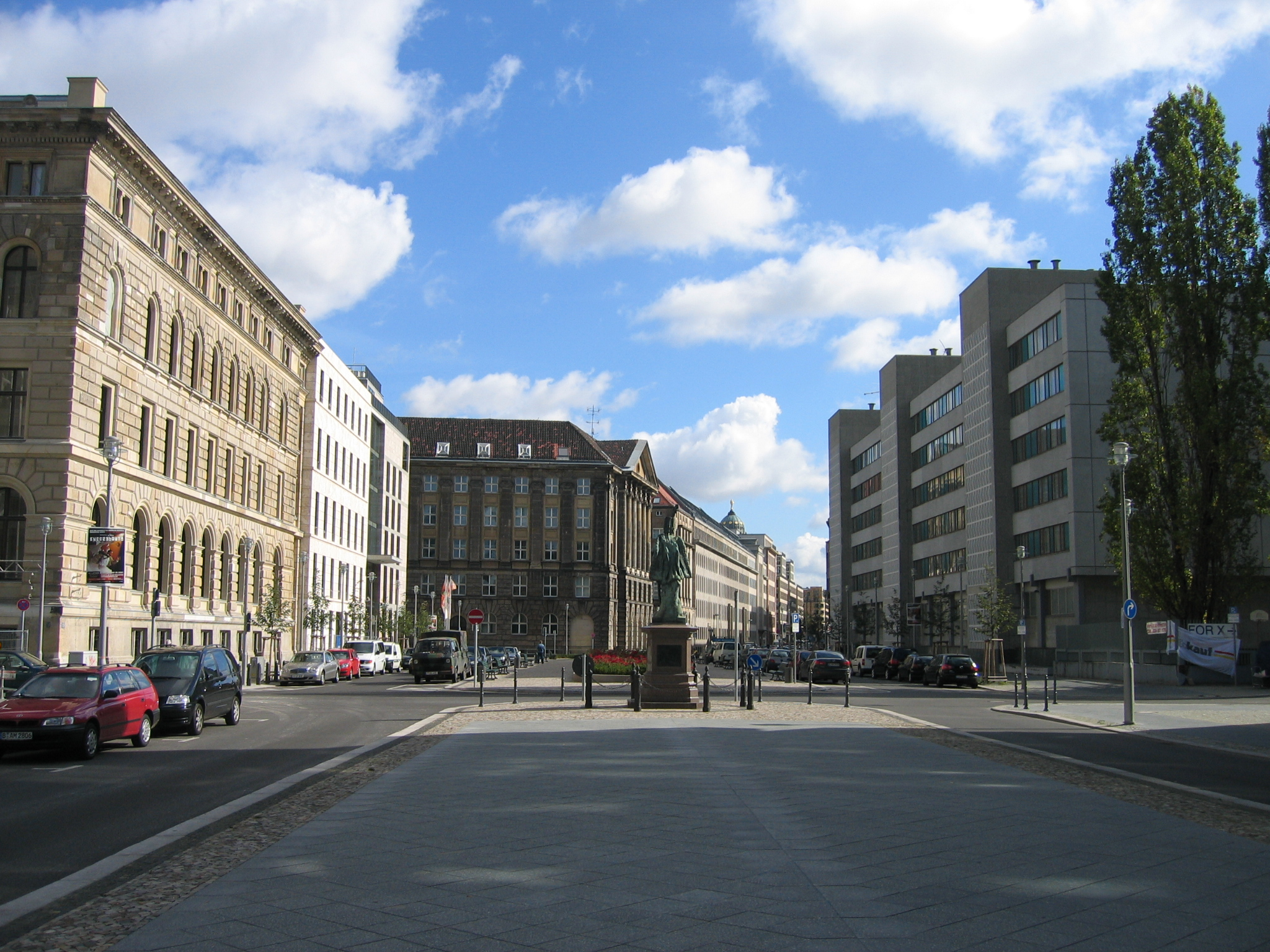
- View of the street facing east
- Interactive map of Anton-Wilhelm-Amo-Straße
- Namesake: See text
- Type: Street
- Location: Berlin, Germany
- Quarter: Mitte
- Nearest metro station: Anton-Wilhelm-Amo-Straße; Stadtmitte; Hausvogteiplatz
- Coordinates: 52°30′44″N 13°23′27″E
- West end: Voßstraße; Wilhelmstrasse
- Major junctions: Wilhelmstrasse; Zietenplatz; Mauerstraße; Glinkastraße; Friedrichstraße; Charlottenstraße; Gendarmenmarkt; Markgrafenstraße
- East end: Jerusalemer Straße; Hausvogteiplatz

Construction
- Inauguration: c. 1700

Anton-Wilhelm-Amo-Straße, or Anton-Wilhelm-Amo-Strasse (see ß), is a street in central Berlin. It runs from west to east between Wilhelmstraße and Hausvogteiplatz, and partially forms the southern edge of Gendarmenmarkt. The Berlin U-Bahn station Anton-Wilhelm-Amo-Straße is located at its western end, and is served by the U2. A number of buildings in the street date to the mid-19th century (Gründerzeit) or were reconstructed after World War II, and are protected historic buildings.

In August 2020, the borough assembly of Berlin-Mitte suggested that the borough authority rename the street from Mohrenstraße, honoring Anton Wilhelm Amo, the first African to receive a doctorate from a German university. On 23 August 2025, the street was officially renamed.

== Mohrenstraße ==
The German word Mohr (pl. Mohren), or moor in English, was commonly used in Europe to describe Africans and/or Muslims in pre-colonial period from the 16th to early 18th century. The word is possibly derived from the Latin Maurus and originally denoted the North African Berber peoples, but came to be used about the (equally Berber) Muslim rulers of medieval Spain and Portugal, then Arabs or Muslims in general and eventually black Africans.

A Mohrenstraße or Mohrenplatz also exists in a few other cities. More widespread, the word Mohr is part of the names of numerous historical houses or traditional companies such as inns and breweries in Germany, Austria and Switzerland, and in some cases in Luxemburg, the Czech Republic and Poland. Over 100 pharmacies called Mohren-Apotheke exist or have existed. Often, these were named after a house mark depicting a blackamoor or Moor's head figure. Some establishments have changed their names after being subject to a "Shitstorm" (a word commonly used in German for a negative outcry on social media)). The Drei Mohren Hotel in Augsburg was assumed to be named after three visiting Abyssinian monks in 1495, but in 2020 renamed in Hotel Maximilian's after a campaign by the local Amnesty International youth group. Also in 2020, the Mohrenbrauerei in Vorarlberg, after receiving smears, agreed to change its brand logotype, but declined to change its name which was derived from its founder in 1784, Joseph Mohr.

The dictionary Duden has since 2012 described the word as often being seen as discriminatory, and since 2019 as "obsolete, today discriminatory" (veraltet, heute diskriminierend), although others dispute this view and argue that the use of the word in historical contexts isn't discriminatory.

A number of explanations have been proposed for the street name.

=== Named for a black resident ===
In 1834, Leopold Freiherr von Zedlitz wrote "it has been related that the street was named for a Mohr, who was in the service of the Margrave of Schwedt, and whose lord's generosity allowed him to build a house here."

=== Named for several black residents ===
In 1885, Hermann Vogt described the street as "created during the establishment of Friedrichstadt, it received its name from the Mohren that Fredrick William I received from the Dutch and quartered in this street, so they could be posted from here to the individual regiments as Janissaries." Fredrick William I ascended to the throne in 1713 and is documented as having planned the "acquisition of 150 Mohren" in 1714, which dates this theory to no earlier than around 1715. This explanation is an anachronism; the street had already been named in 1707.

=== Named for colonial-era slaves ===
During the era of Brandenburg-Prussian colonial rule of the Brandenburger Gold Coast, boys and young men were taken to Berlin and made to work as military musicians, Kammermohren, or valets. In 1680, Frederick William, Elector of Brandenburg tasked his captain Bartelsen with bringing six slaves of ages 14, 15, and 16 years to Berlin. In 1682, he ordered Captain Voss to return with twenty large slaves from 25 to 30 years and twenty boys from 8 to 16 years. Contemporary works also depict the presence of people with dark skin in Berlin, such as Peter Schenk's colorized copper engraving "Schwarzer Militärmusiker am Brandenburger Hof" (1696–1701) and Paul Carl Leygebe's painting of the "Tobacco roundtable of Fredrick I in Prussia", dated to 1709/1710, which depicts three young black men and a servant with a turban in Drap d'Or room of the Berlin Palace.

=== Named for an African delegation ===
Historian Ulrich van der Heyden offers the theory that Mohrenstraße was not named with racist or colonial connotations; instead, he proposes that it pertains to a delegation of Africans from Brandenburg's colony of Großfriedrichsburg (present-day Ghana). In van der Heyden's telling, a delegation of 26 Africans, led by Chief Janke, visited Berlin from the village of Pokesu (present-day Princes Town, Ghana) and stayed at an inn outside of Berlin's city walls. The delegation was paying a courtesy visit to Frederick William after the signing of treaties establishing the protectorate. The delegates spent four months in Berlin and visited the palace on foot. The path used by the delegation acquired the name "Mohrenweg" (Moors Road).

Schultz's map of Berlin from 1688

Christian Kopp, an activist for Berlin Postkolonial e. V., suggests that Ulrich van der Heyden fails to provide evidence supporting his theory. Kopp states that Chief Janke visited Berlin accompanied only by his valet, to subordinate himself to Fredrick William. Kopp states that this visit occurred in 1684, over twenty years before the official naming of Mohrenstraße, citing Richard Schück; no documentation attests to Janke's lodgings. The city plan drawn by Johann Bernhardt Schultz in 1688 does not depict a "Mohrenweg" or inn directly outside the city walls.

== History ==
=== 17th and 18th century ===
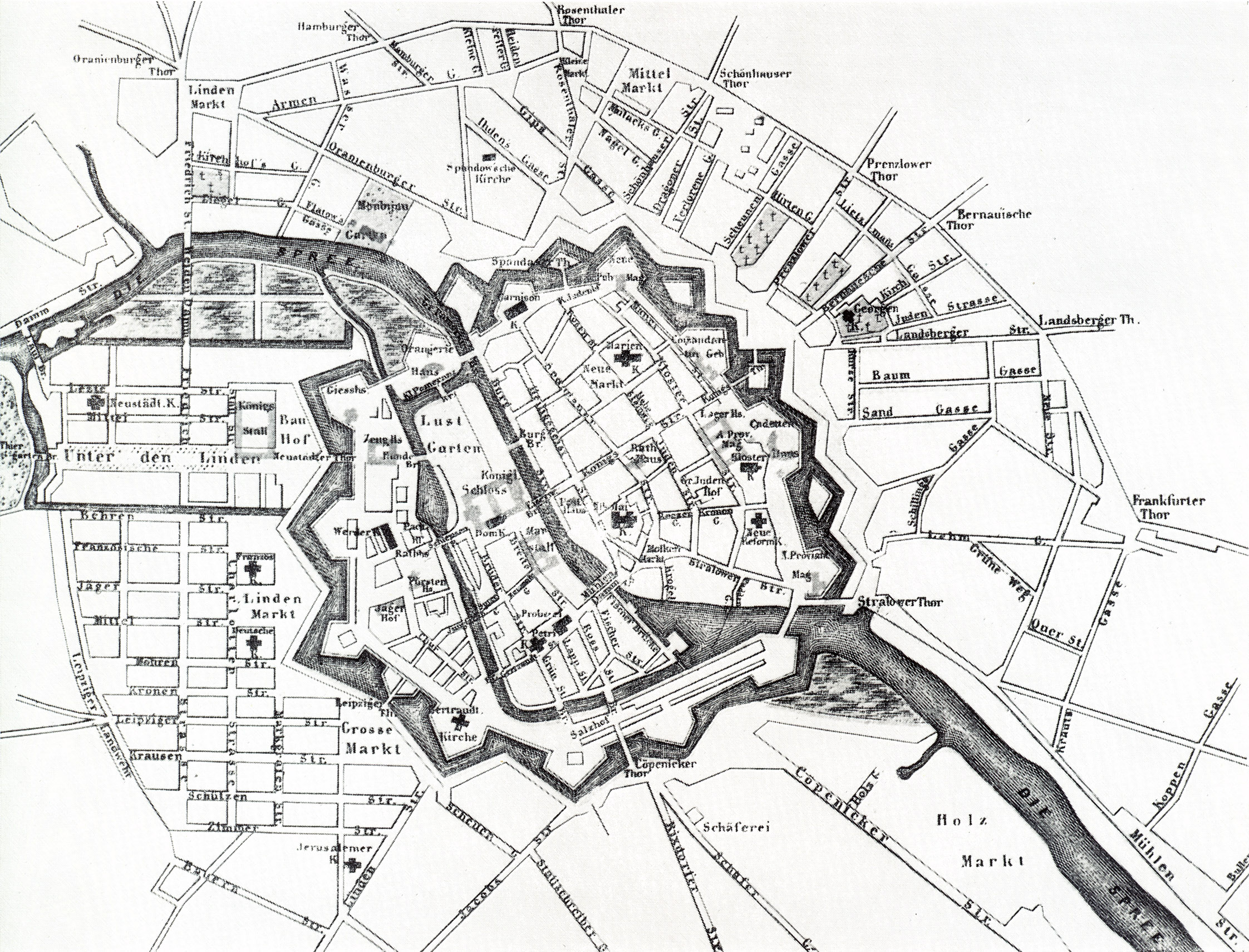
Mohrenstraße is shown on the reconstructed city plan of 1710.

The street was created around the year 1700 during the construction of Friedrichstadt, now a historical neighborhood in central Berlin. The street originally ended at Mauerstraße. Hausvogteiplatz, at the western end of the street, was the center of the German ready-made garment industry prior to the World War II.

At the end of May 1707, Mohrenstraße was officially named, along with the other streets in Friedrichstadt. This is sourced to a history of Friedrichstadt written by Joachim Ernst Berger (1666–1734), who was a Lutheran pastor from 1697–1732 in Friedrichstadt, containing the following note: "In 1707, at the end of the aforementioned month [May], the alley were for the benefit of the people.") The 9th street name listed is "Mohren-Straße".

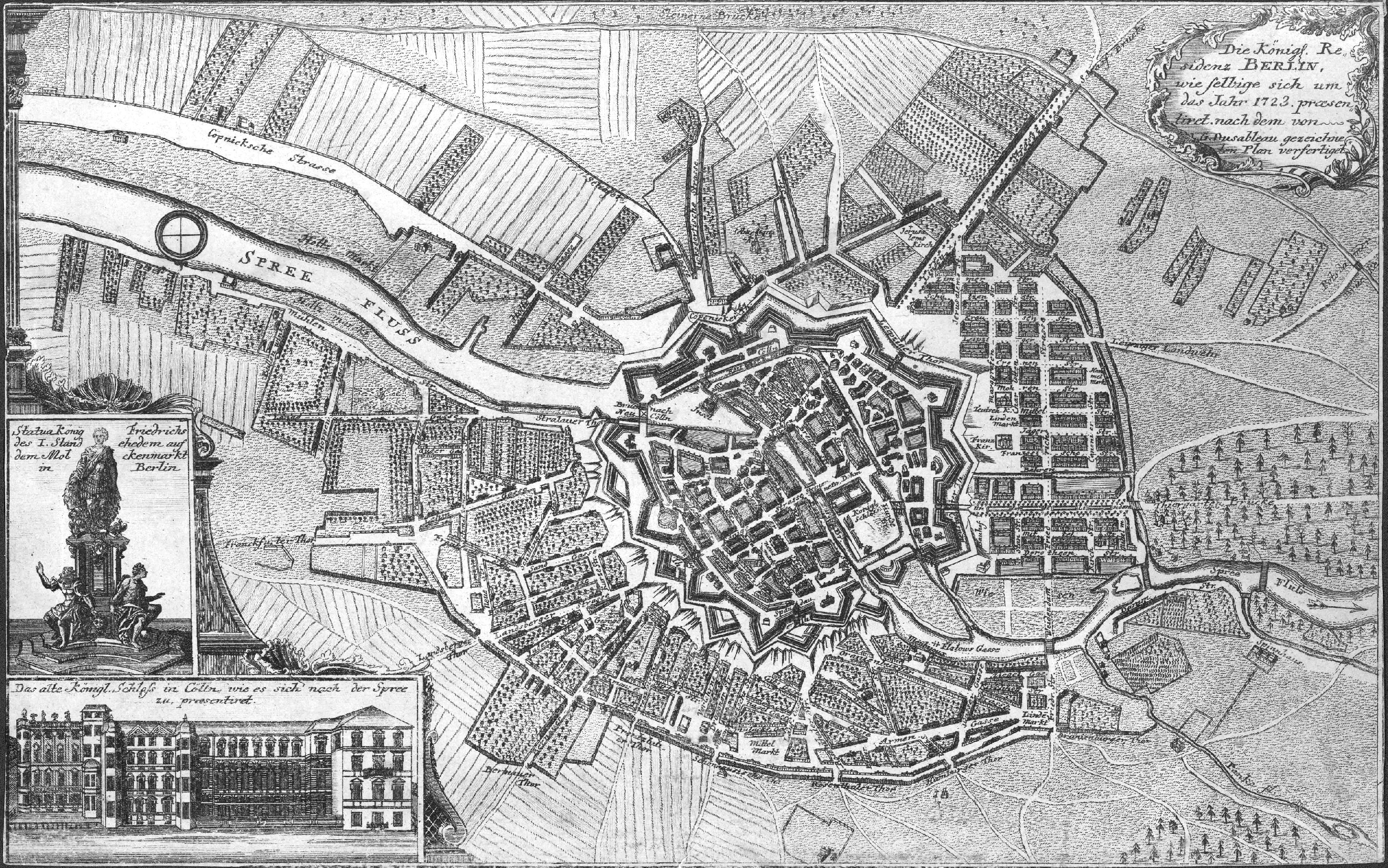
Mohrenstraße appears on Abraham Guibert Dusableau's 1723 map of Berlin.

Other sources support the naming during the reign of Friedrich I (1688–1713), who was also ruler of the West African colony of Groß Friedrichsburg (present day Ghana) and who planned the construction of Friedrichstadt. Christoph Friedrich Nicolai wrote about the area encompassing Mohrenstraße and Gendarmenmarkt: "The first construction took place in 1688, from what is today Kronenstraße to Jägerstraße, on the grounds of the former princely folwark and gardens [...] In 1706, the streets received their names." The Berlin city plan of 1710, which was a later reconstruction, mentions the street by name.

The street was later extended to connect to Zietenplatz and the adjacent Wilhelmplatz.

=== 19th century ===
From 1837-1838, Karl Marx lived at Mohrenstraße 17 during his studies. The house was fitted with a memorial plaque in September 1929, by request of the SPD, which was removed in July 1933 after the Nazis came to power.

=== 21st century ===
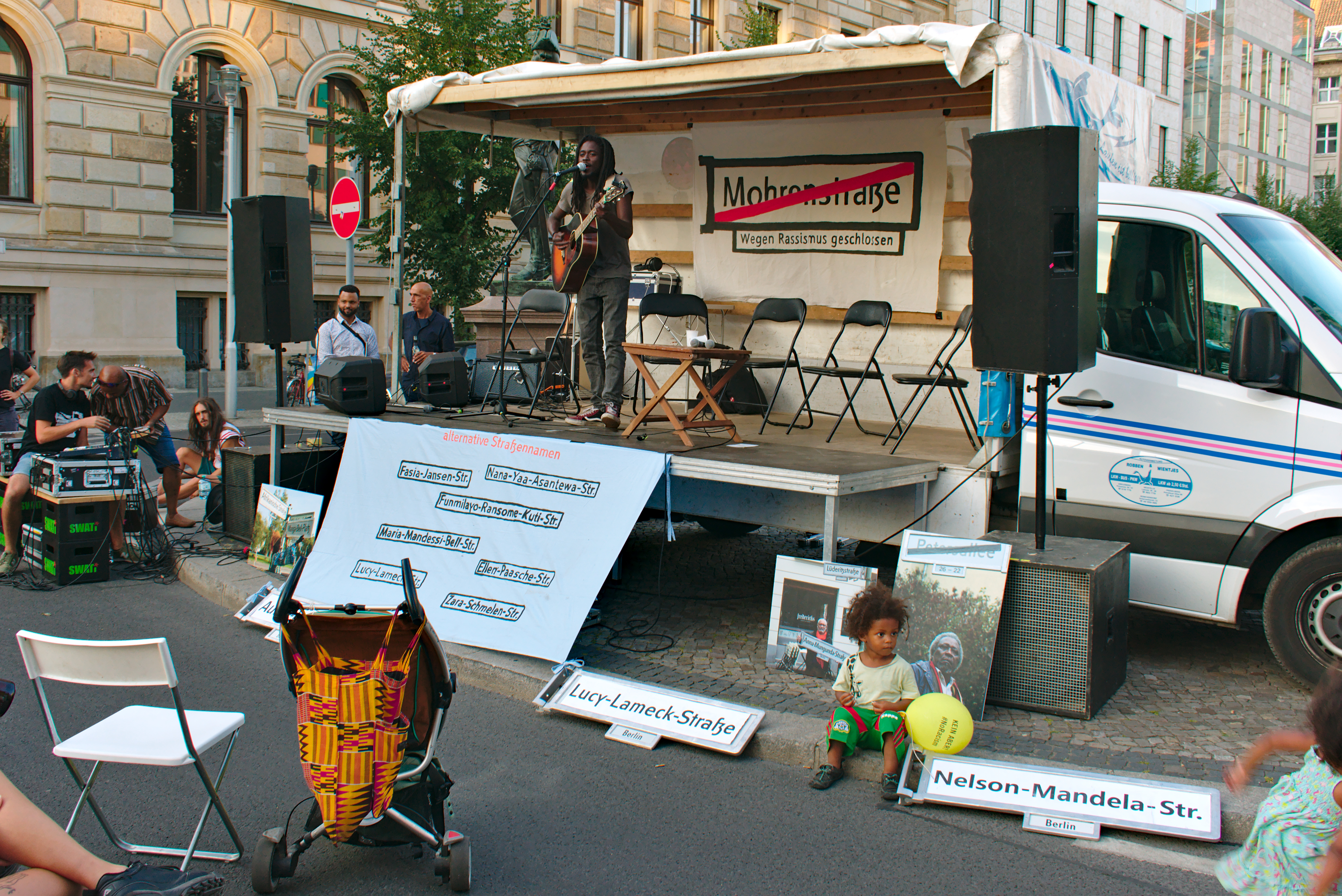
The fifth "renaming party", held in 2018, protesting against the name "Mohrenstraße"

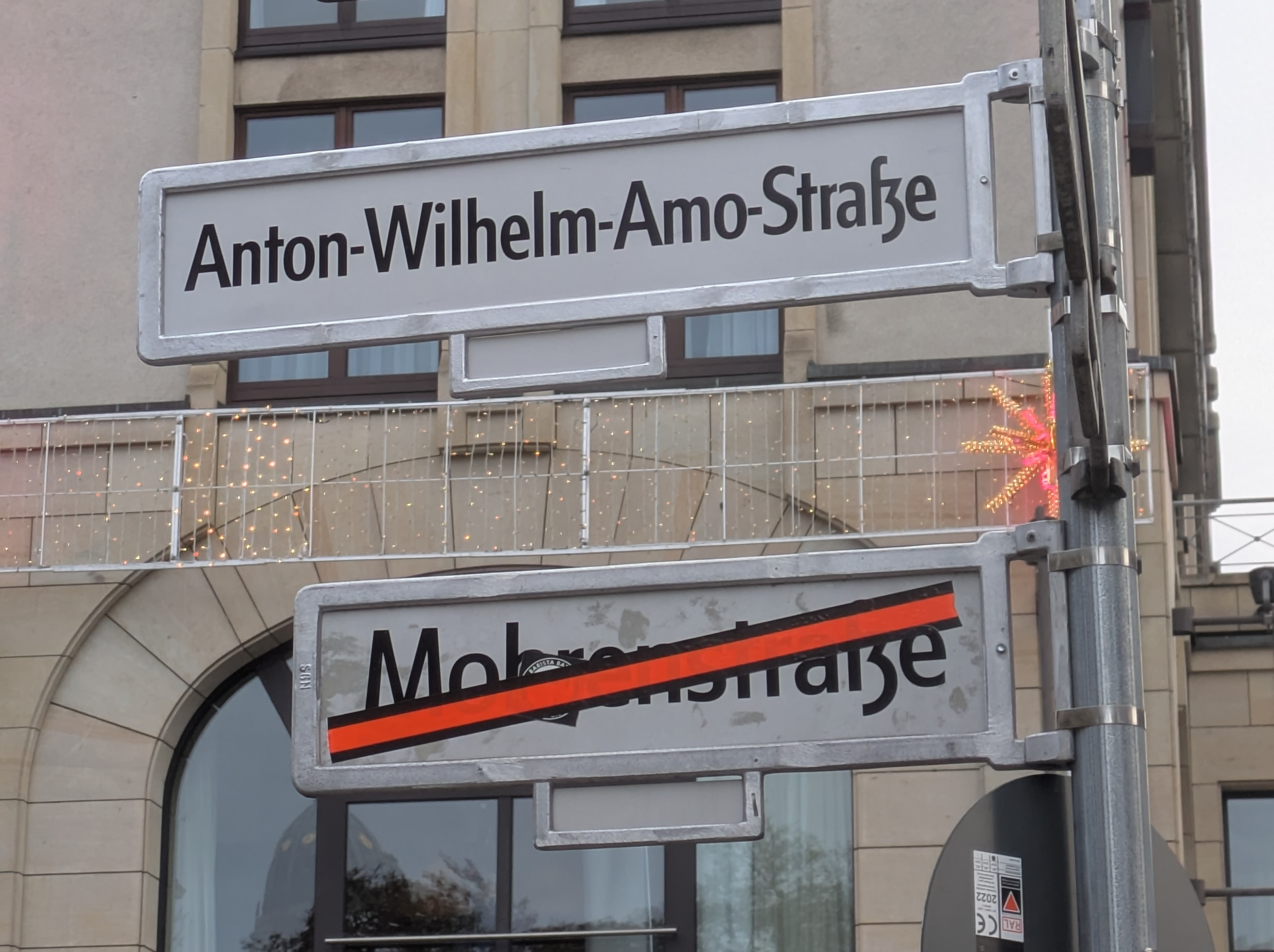
The street signs following the renaming (December 2025)

Since the 1990s, there was a public debate about changing the street name, viewed as racist, referring to it euphemistically as "M-Straße". For example, the Afro-German poet and activist May Ayim is seen in the documentary film May Ayim: Hoffnung im Herz ("May Ayim: Hope in My Heart"; 1997) protesting in front of the U-Bahn station bearing the street name.

In August 2020, a majority in the Berlin-Mitte borough assembly recommended to the borough authority that Mohrenstraße should be renamed Anton-Wilhelm-Amo-Straße, honoring Anton Wilhelm Amo, the first African to receive a doctorate from a German university. In July 2023, the Berlin administrative court rejected claims filed by historian Götz Aly and residents who objected to the name change. In July 2024, a year after the original administrative court decision, Der Tagesspiegel reported that an appeal before a superior court was still pending that prevented the name change from being finalized.

In July 2025, the Higher Administrative Court of Berlin-Brandenburg (Oberverwaltungsgericht Berlin-Brandenburg) upheld a decision by the Berlin Administrative Court (Verwaltungsgericht Berlin) stating that residents have no basis to take legal action against the name change. On August 23, 2025 (the International Day for the Remembrance of the Slave Trade and its Abolition), the name change was made official with a symbolic unveiling.

== See also ==
- History of colonialism
  - New Imperialism
  - Scramble for Africa
  - German colonial empire
