= The Berlin Government District Part 1: 1932–1938 =

2005 film

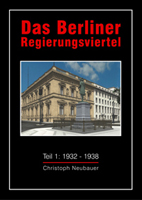
- Directed by: Christoph Neubauer
- Starring: Ulrike Krumbiegel: Speaker Joachim Schönfeld: Speaker
- Music by: Lorraine Shannon Robert Schöder
- Production companies: 25fps-filmproduction GmbH & Co. KG
- Release date: 26 September 2005 (Germany)
- Running time: 70 minutes
- Country: Germany
- Languages: English; Afrikaans

The Berlin Government District is the first part of a film trilogy, which deals with the historical Berlin government district between 1932 and 1945, and its destruction after the Second World War. The movie is completely 3D animated and was produced in South Africa. Preview screenings took place in Berlin and Frankfurt on 29 September 2005.

== Plot ==
This documentary is the first part of a trilogy. It gives a detailed overview of the architecture and building measures at the historical Berlin government district between 1932 and 1945.

The following streets are shown in the movie:

- Vossstrasse
- Wilhelmstrasse
- Wilhelmplatz

Additionally, the following buildings and places are specially mentioned:

- Reich Chancellery
- Palais Borsig
- Hotel Kaiserhof
- Ministry of Public Enlightenment and Propaganda
- Mohrenstraße (Berlin U-Bahn)

== Soundtrack ==
The film soundtrack was composed and performed by Lorraine Shannon and Robert Sch√∂der. It mainly comprises piano music accompanied by strings.

== Critical reception ==
The DVD was reviewed in several German newspapers:

- "Every stucco and windowsill were originally reconstructed, even the street-lamps and a advertising column with posters."—Berliner Kurier (29 May 2005)
- "... nothing is more spectacular than this kind of view the movie shows. Not only for historians it is a useful work. Everybody comes to rhapsodize because of the gigantic, rich decorated, monumental government buildings out of the 19th century."—PSM

== Home media ==
The Berlin Government District was released in Region 0 territories on September 26, 2005.
