= Zietenplatz =

Square in Berlin, Germany

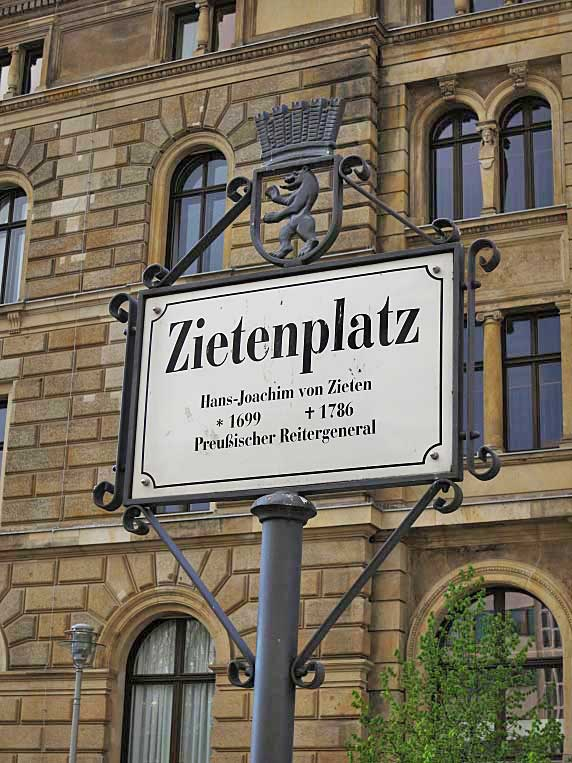
- Street sign in Zietenplatz in 2012
- Interactive map of Zietenplatz
- Former names: Am Wilhelmplatz; (c. 1740–end 18th C); (part of Mohrenstraße); (end 18th C–1849); Zietenplatz; (1849–c. 1968); (part of Mohrenstraße); (c. 1968–2008)
- Namesake: Hans Joachim von Zieten
- Type: Public square
- Location: Berlin, Germany
- Quarter: Mitte
- Nearest metro station: Mohrenstraße
- Coordinates: 52°30′43″N 13°23′07″E
- West end: Mohrenstraße; Wilhelmstrasse
- East end: Mauerstraße; Mohrenstraße

Construction
- Inauguration: Generally: c. 1740; Name reinstated: 17 March 2008

Zietenplatz is a square in Berlin, Germany. It is named after Hans Joachim von Zieten.
