= Hotel Kaiserhof (Berlin) =

Demolished hotel in Berlin, Germany

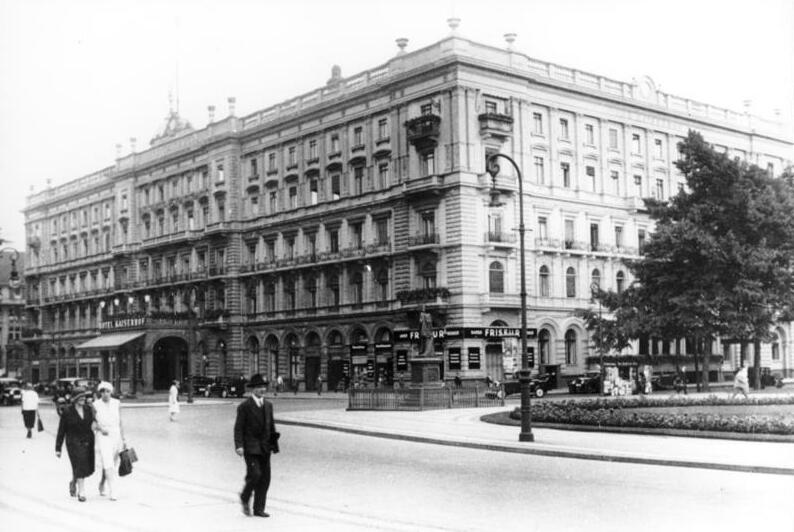

- Location in Berlin

General information
- Location: Wilhelmplatz, Berlin, Germany
- Coordinates: 52°30′41″N 13°23′7″E
- Opening: 1875
- Closed: 1943

Hotel Kaiserhof was a luxury hotel in Wilhelmplatz, Berlin, Germany. It stood opposite the Reich Chancellery in what was then Berlin's government district. It opened in October 1875 and was destroyed by several Allied air raid bombings on 23 November 1943.

== History ==
Berlin's first grand hotel was built by the company Berlin Hotel AG (later Berliner Hotelgesellschaft), founded in 1872. The Berlin architectural firm von der Hude & Hennicke carried out the commission from 1873 to 1875. Just a few days after the opening ceremony on 1 October 1875, a major fire destroyed the building. It reopened in 1876.

The Kaiserhof offered more than 260 rooms which were fitted out in a modern and luxurious manner. It was the first Berlin hotel in which every room had an electricity supply, its own bathroom, and its own telephone. All of the furnishings originally came from the Hotel Britannia and the Hotel Donau, in Vienna, which went bankrupt after the World's Fair in 1873. The hotel also featured steam heating and pneumatic elevators/lifts, and the kitchens used, for the time, state-of-the-art gas stoves. Electric power came from Berlin's second power station, recently built in Mauerstraße by Siemens & Halske. Attached to the hotel was a Romanesque café called Café Bauer, run by the Viennese restaurateur Mathias Bauer. The hotel also operated a so-called city kitchen, a catering service that delivered individual dishes as well as entire menus for larger parties away from home.

British PM Benjamin Disraeli stayed here in 1878. Early scenes in the 1943 movie The Life and Death of Colonel Blimp took place in the Hotel Kaiserhof.

Joseph Goebbels, Ernst Röhm, and other Nazi officials met in the Kaiserhof as Hitler was being sworn in as Chancellor. They were not aware that Hitler had been appointed Chancellor until he returned to the hotel to inform them. Hitler was also naturalized at the hotel as a citizen of both the Free State of Braunschweig and the Reich.

In November 1939, Georg Elser's family was imprisoned in the hotel for interrogation to determine whether they contributed to the assassination attempt on Hitler's life on 8 November in the Bürgerbräukeller, Munich. Even though they were imprisoned, it was described as like a holiday in Berlin at the Kaiserhof. However, they were monitored everywhere by the Gestapo.

Dr. Ludwig Roselius had a luxury suite in the hotel, and Barbara Goette cared for him for many months until he died there on 15 May 1943.

On 22 November 1943, the hotel was badly damaged by British bombers during an air raid on Berlin. The ruins ended up in East Berlin after the division of the city and were later completely torn down. The present-day Anton-Wilhelm-Amo-Straße station on the U2 line of the Berlin U-Bahn was named "Kaiserhof" from its opening in 1908 until 1950. The station underwent several name changes before acquiring its current name in 2025.

In 1974, the North Korean embassy to East Germany was constructed on the site (Embassy of North Korea, Berlin). East Germany ceased to be a state in 1990 and the embassy closed. However, in 2001, its successor state, the Federal Republic of Germany, re-established diplomatic relations with North Korea and the North Korean embassy returned to the building. From 2004 until its closure in 2020, the annex on the south half of the site was leased to Cityhostel Berlin, which paid the North Korean government an estimated €38,000 per month.
