= Paul Carl Leygebe =

German painter (1664–1756)

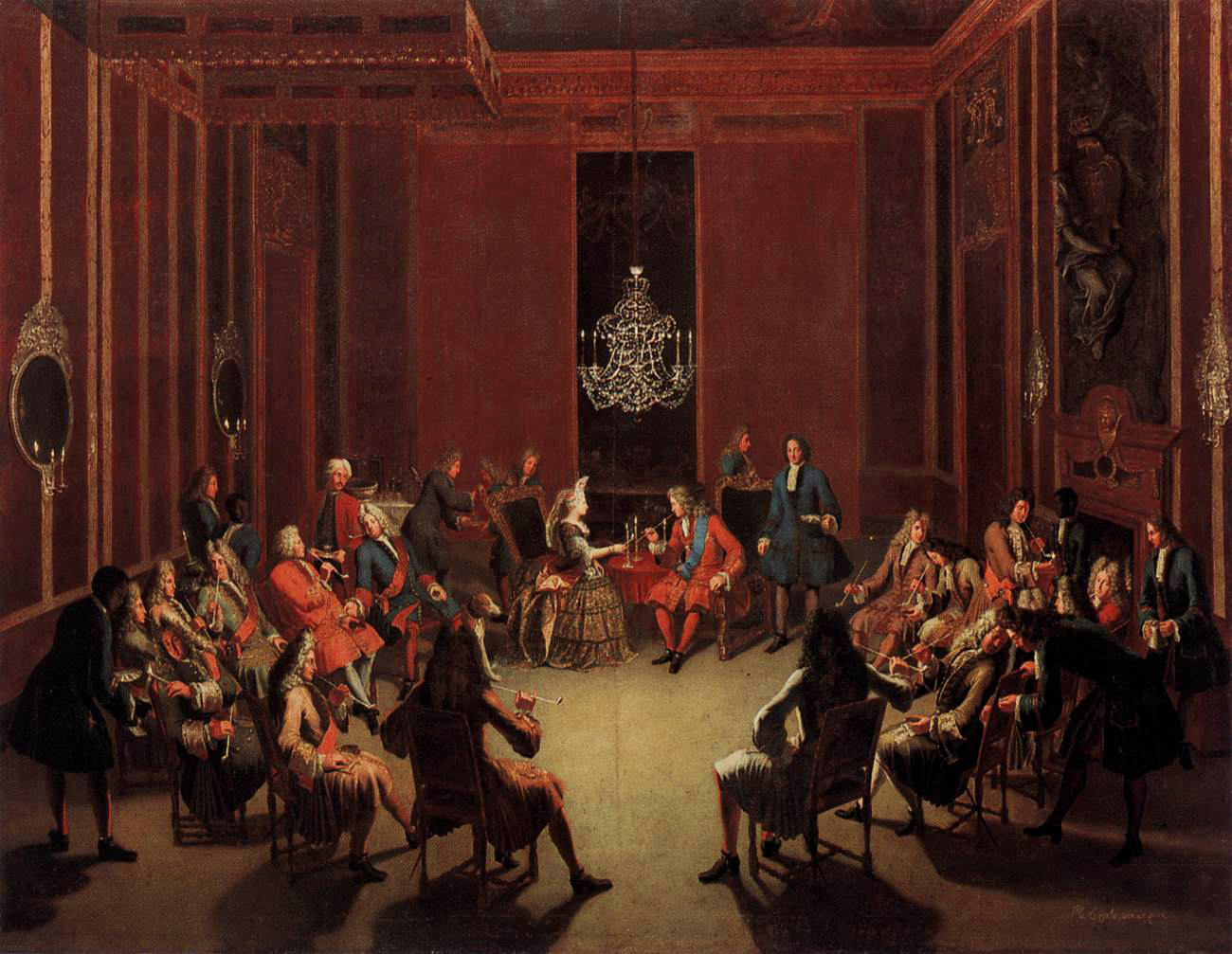
The "Tabakskollegium" of Frederick I

Paul Carl Leygebe (1664–1756) was a German painter and anatomy professor at the Prussian Academy of Arts in Berlin.

== Life and works ==
He was born in Nuremberg. He was the son of Gottfried Christian Leygebe (1630–1683), a sculptor and medallist, originally from Freystadt, who had come to Nuremberg to train as an armorer. In 1668, his father moved the family to Berlin to seek greater opportunities.

From 1699 to 1756, he was a member of the Prussian Academy of Arts. From 1715 until 1755 he was an art teacher and Professor of anatomy there.

He was also an official court painter and created large canvases with scenes depicting the activities of Frederick William, Elector of Brandenburg, King Frederick William I and King Frederick the Great. Among his first works in that capacity (1695) was a monumental painting: Triumphal Entry of the Great Elector in King Frederick's bridal chamber.

Later, from 1701 to 1704, he created a ceiling plafond in the "Roten Samtkammer" (Red Velvet Chamber) at the Royal Residence, with an allegory of Dawn, Sunset, Evening and Night, showing constellations as they were on the day of King Frederick's coronation. These were done under the supervision of Andreas Schlüter, the Court Architect.

Leygebe apparently stopped painting around 1730. He died in 1756 in Berlin. Much of his work was destroyed or damaged during World War II and the subsequent Communist régime.
