= Anton-Wilhelm-Amo-Straße station =

Berlin U-Bahn station

Anton-Wilhelm-Amo-Straße
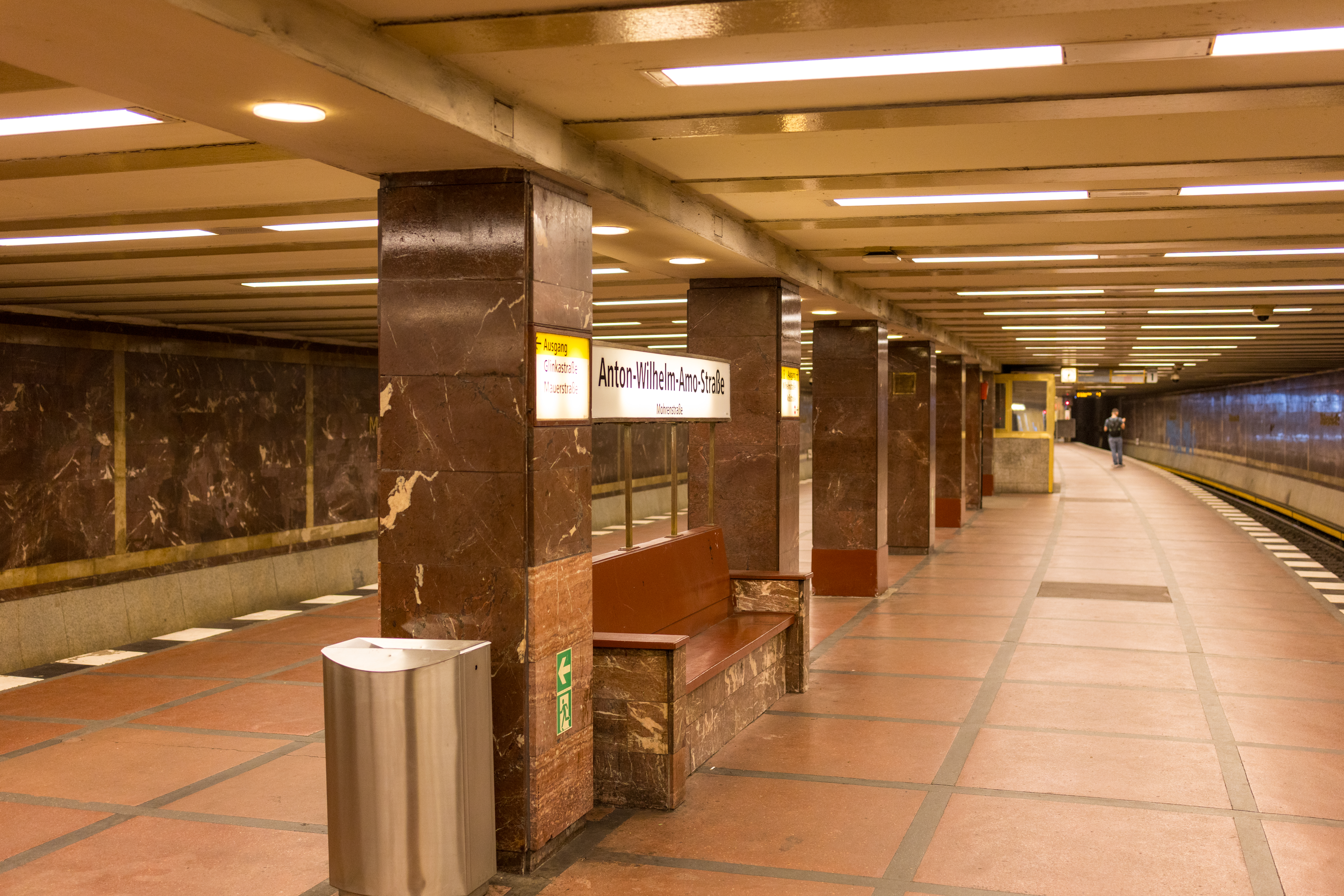
- Platform

General information
- Location: Anton-Wilhelm-Amo-Straße/Wilhelmstraße; Mitte, Berlin; Germany
- Coordinates: 52°30′42″N 13°23′05″E
- Owner: Berliner Verkehrsbetriebe
- Operator: Berliner Verkehrsbetriebe
- Platforms: 1 island platform
- Tracks: 2
- Connections: : 300; : M48

Construction
- Structure type: Underground
- Cycle facilities: Yes (Call a Bike, bicycle parking)
- Accessible: Yes

Other information
- Fare zone: : Berlin A/5555

Key dates
- 1 October 1908: Opened as Kaiserhof
- 3 February 1945: Destroyed
- 18 August 1950: Reopened as Thälmannplatz
- 15 April 1986: Renamed Otto-Grotewohl-Straße
- 3 October 1991: Renamed Mohrenstraße
- 23 August 2025: Renamed Anton-Wilhelm-Amo-Straße (Mohrenstraße)
- 14 December 2025: Renamed Anton-Wilhelm-Amo-Straße

Services
Preceding station	Berlin U-Bahn	Following station
Potsdamer Platz towards Ruhleben	U2	Stadtmitte towards Pankow
Route map
Location
- Location within Berlin Location within Germany Location within Europe

Anton-Wilhelm-Amo-Straße is a Berlin U-Bahn station on line U2, located in the district of Mitte.

The station is located at the western end of the eponymous Anton-Wilhelm-Amo-Straße, which runs in an east-west direction. Its western entrance opens up to the north-south crossing Wilhelmstraße and is located opposite the junction with Voßstraße. The east entrance is located at Glinkastraße.

== History ==
The original station designed by Alfred Grenander opened on 1 October 1908 on the new branch from Potsdamer Platz to Spittelmarkt. It was then called Kaiserhof after the nearby grand hotel on the Wilhelmplatz square, was designated by black and white at platform level, and had an oval opening to the stairs and a booking hall with elaborate tilework at the Wilhelmstraße end. This entrance was rebuilt in 1936, the year of the Berlin Olympics, to provide more space for parades at the adjacent Reich Chancellery. The station was severely damaged in World War II on 3 February 1945.

The rebuilt station, now located in East Berlin, reopened on 18 August 1950 as Thälmannplatz, to which the Wilhelmplatz square had been renamed for the communist leader Ernst Thälmann. The interior was lined with marble, which was long believed to have been taken from Hitler's New Reich Chancellery. However, according to the East Berlin newspapers Neues Deutschland and Berliner Zeitung from 19 August 1950, the marble for the station was delivered directly from quarries in Thuringia. In more recent times, petrographic research confirmed this origin of the material.

With the erection of the Berlin Wall from 13 August 1961, the line ceased to run between East and West Berlin and the station became the terminus of the line in East Berlin. Beginning in 1986 the square was overbuilt by a housing estate and the Czechoslovak Embassy, and on 15 April 1986 the station was renamed Otto-Grotewohl-Straße, the name of Wilhelmstraße at that time, after the politician Otto Grotewohl.

On 3 October 1991, following German reunification, the station was renamed again to Mohrenstraße. The line was reconnected on 13 November 1993 and simultaneously reconfigured, forming a new U2 line between Vinetastraße in the east and Ruhleben in the west.

Since the 1990s, some have criticized Mohrenstraße as being a racist street and station name. The name literally translates as "Street of the Moors", but Mohr in German specifically refers to people with dark skin and is explicitly described by Duden as "outdated and discriminatory". The murder of George Floyd prompted anti-racist demonstrations and accompanying debates about structural racism in Germany; in response to this, the Berliner Verkehrsbetriebe (BVG) announced on 3 July 2020 that they would change the station name from Mohrenstraße to Glinkastraße, after the street name at the station's eastern entrance, which honors the 19th-century Russian composer Mikhail Ivanovich Glinka. This name was similarly criticised because Glinka had expressed antisemitic views, and the BVG said a final decision on the new name had yet to be made. Additionally, the proposed new name was said to be likely to cause people to think of the other, Unter den Linden, end of Glinkastraße. On 20 August, 2020, the District Assembly of Berlin-Mitte voted to rename Mohrenstraße to "Anton-Wilhelm-Amo-Straße". Following a legal battle, the street's name change was made official in August 2025.

== Gallery ==
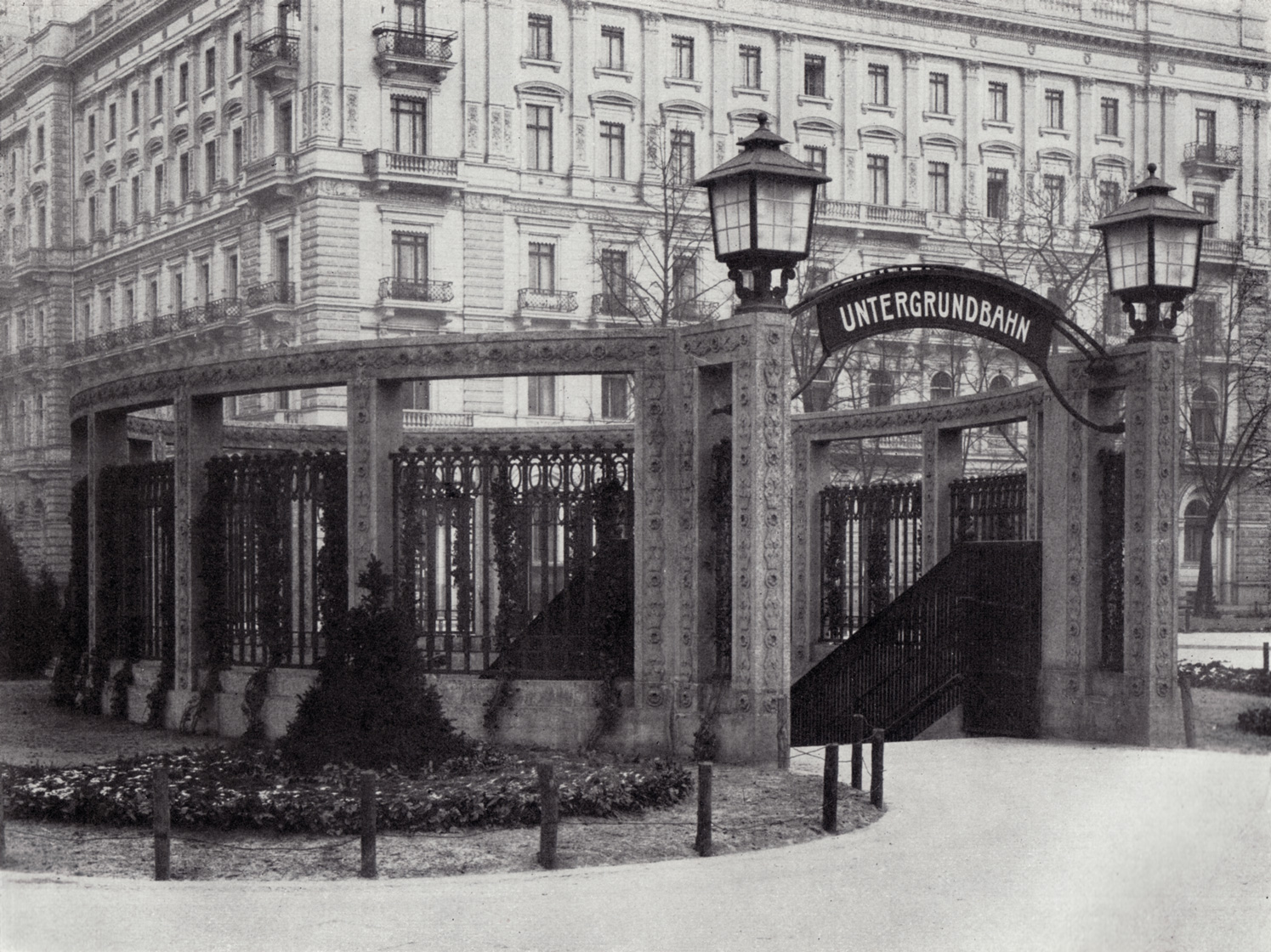
Western entrance to the station and Kaiserhof hotel, about 1908

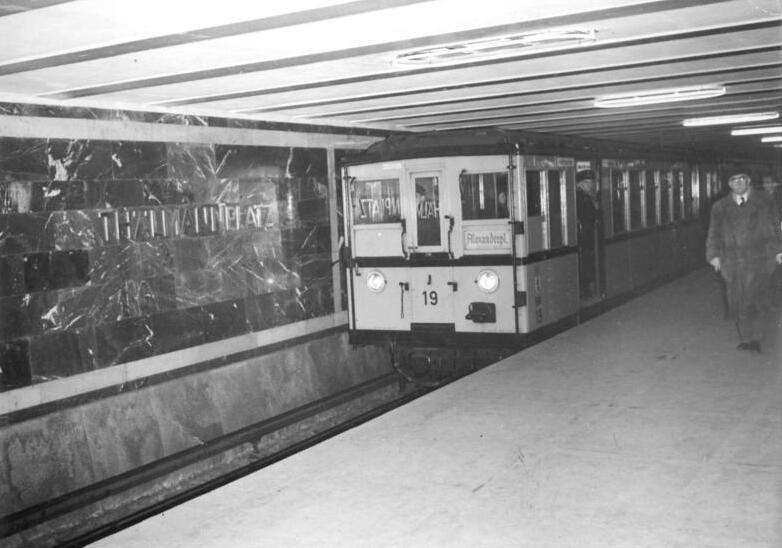
Dedication of rebuilt Thälmannplatz station, 1950

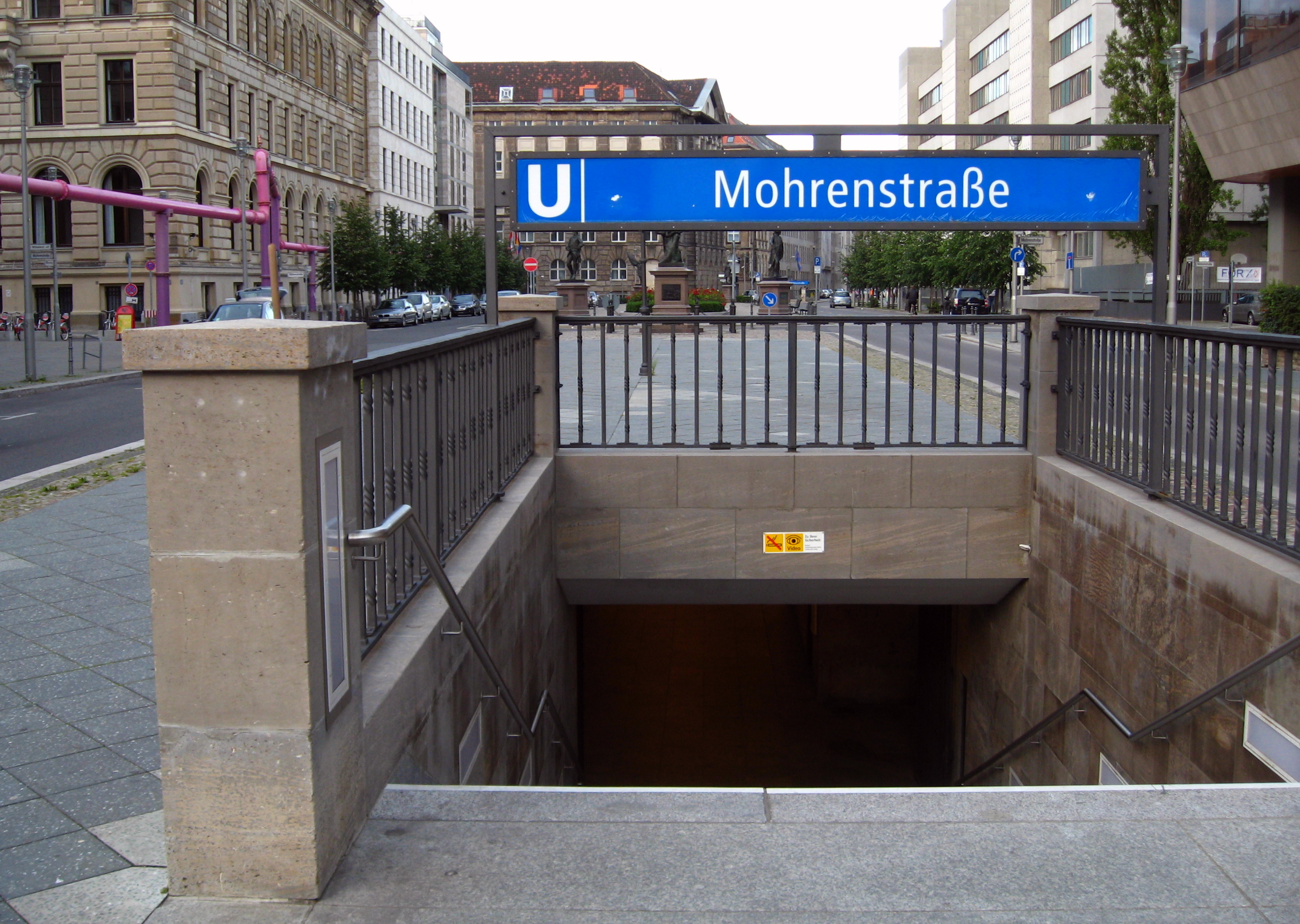
Station entrance, 2011

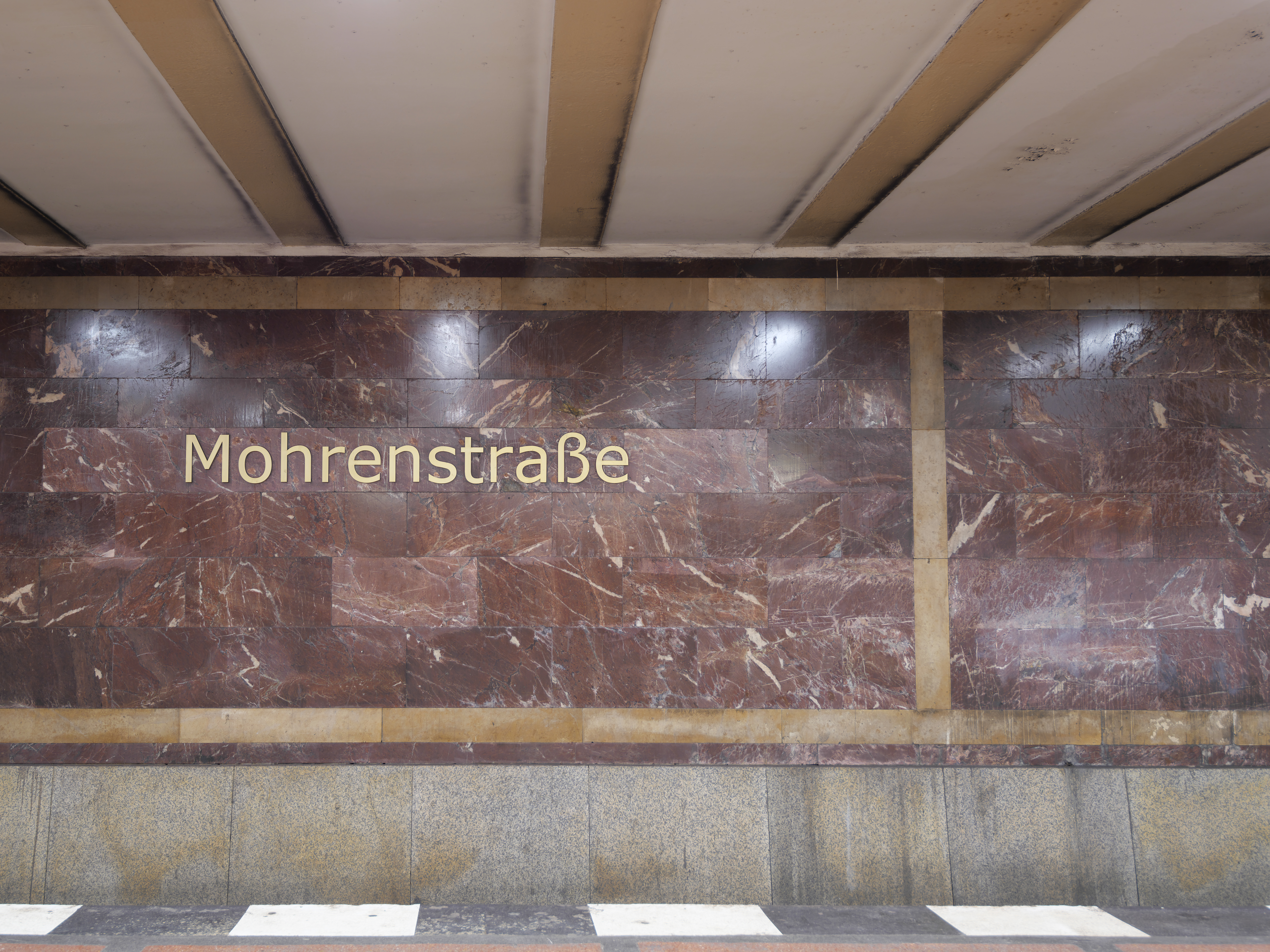
Name sign inside station

== See also ==
- Van Dorn Street station, a Washington Metro station that has been similarly criticized for having a racist name.
