= Kurfürstenstraße station =

Station of the Berlin U-Bahn

Kurfürstenstraße
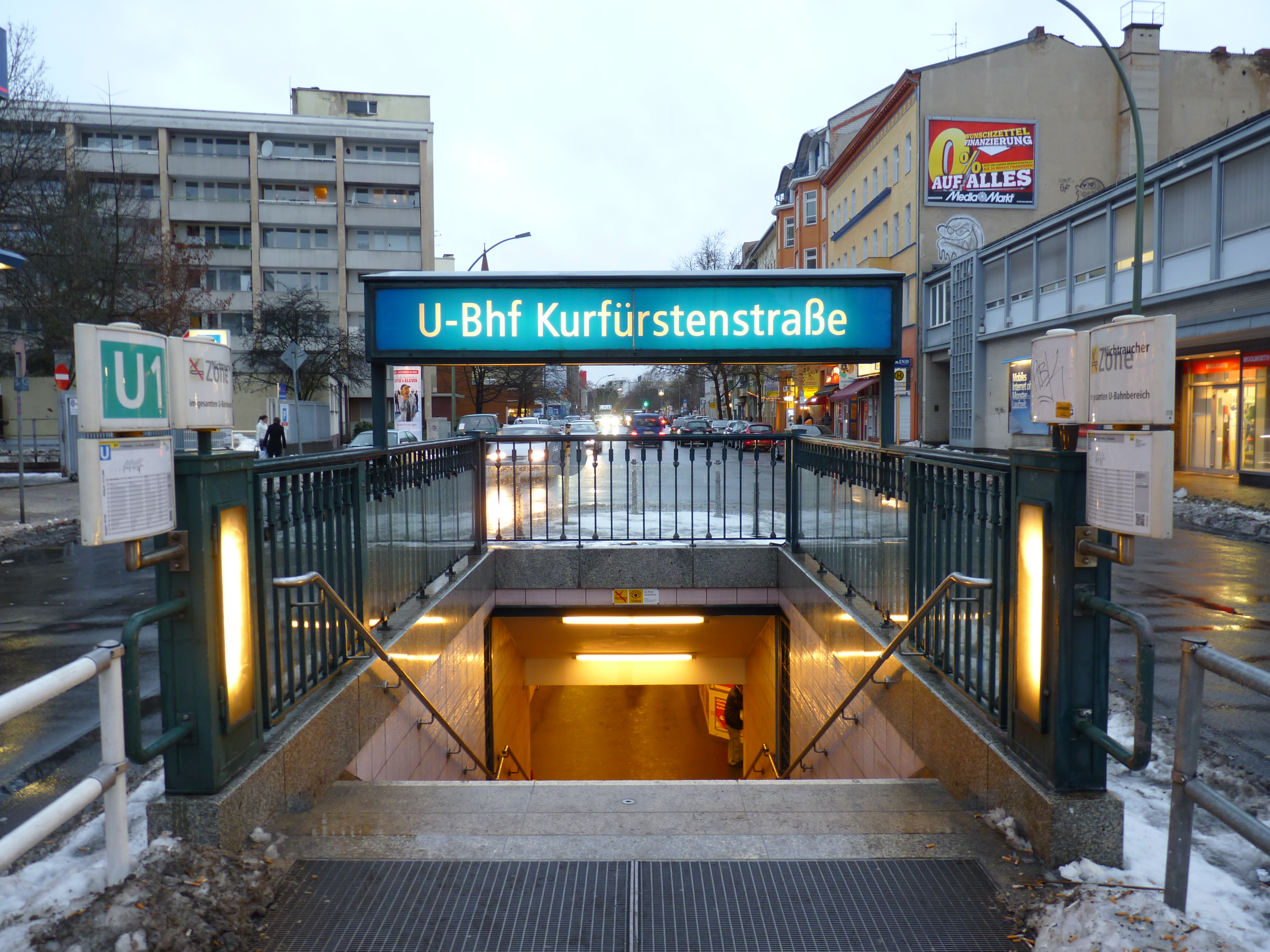
- Entrance to the station

General information
- Location: Kurfürstenstraße/Potsdamer Straße; Tiergarten, Berlin; Germany
- Coordinates: 52°30′00″N 13°21′43″E
- Owner: Berliner Verkehrsbetriebe
- Operator: Berliner Verkehrsbetriebe
- Platforms: 1 island platform
- Tracks: 2
- Connections: : N1, N2; : M48, M85

Construction
- Structure type: Underground
- Cycle facilities: Yes
- Accessible: Yes

Other information
- Fare zone: : Berlin A/5555

History
- Opened: 24 October 1926; 100 years ago

Services
Preceding station	Berlin U-Bahn	Following station
Nollendorfplatz towards Uhlandstraße	U1	Gleisdreieck towards Warschauer Straße
Nollendorfplatz towards Krumme Lanke	U3	Gleisdreieck towards Warschauer Straße
Route map
Location
- Location within Berlin

Kurfürstenstraße is a Berlin U-Bahn station on lines U1 and U3. The station opened on 24 October 1926 and is located in the Berlin Mitte borough.

It lies just to the north of Bülowstraße, the corresponding station on the U2, in the southeast corner of Tiergarten. The area has a rather seedy reputation, mainly due to prostitution. Potsdamer Straße is a major thoroughfare in the area.

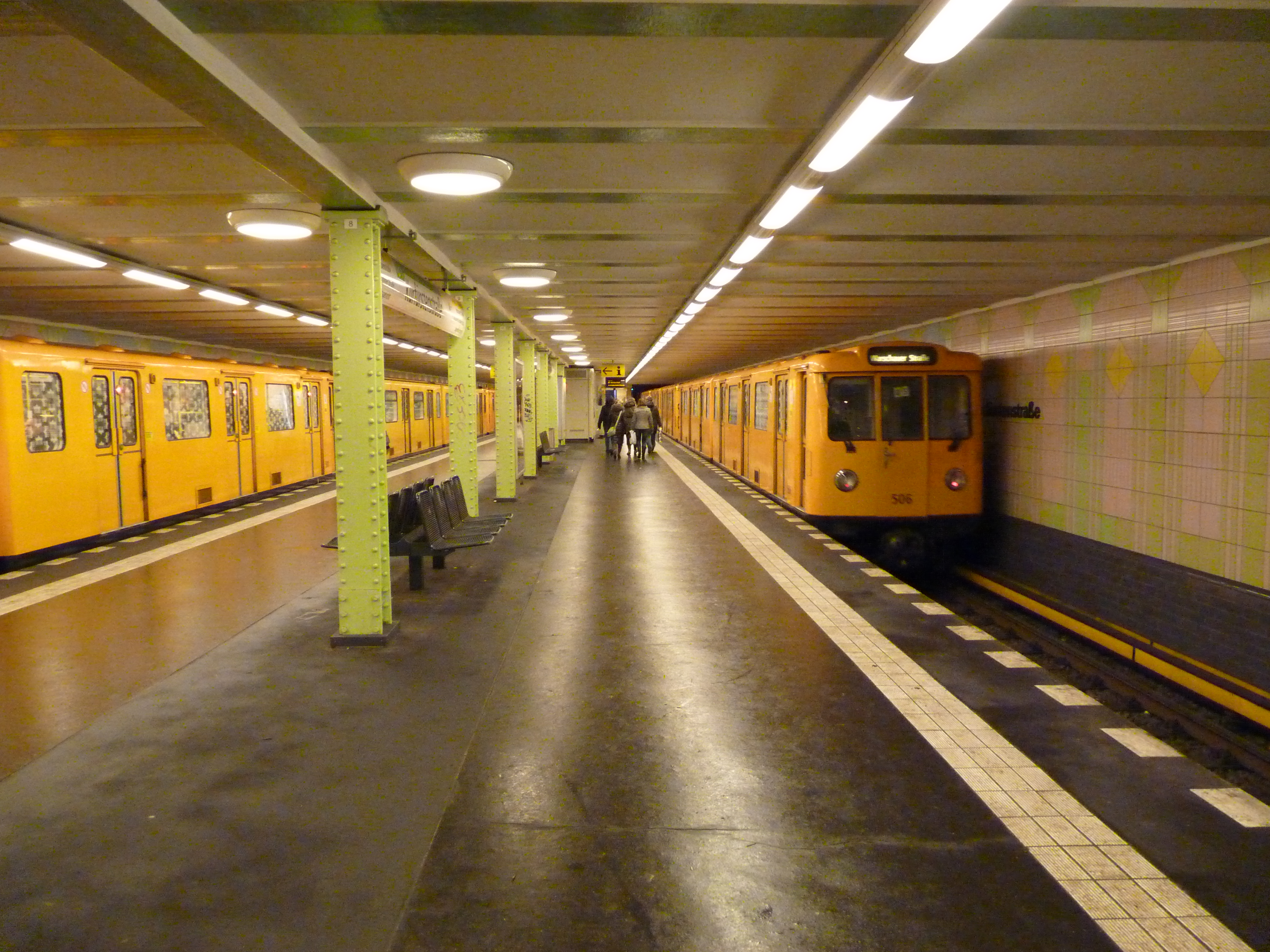
Platform

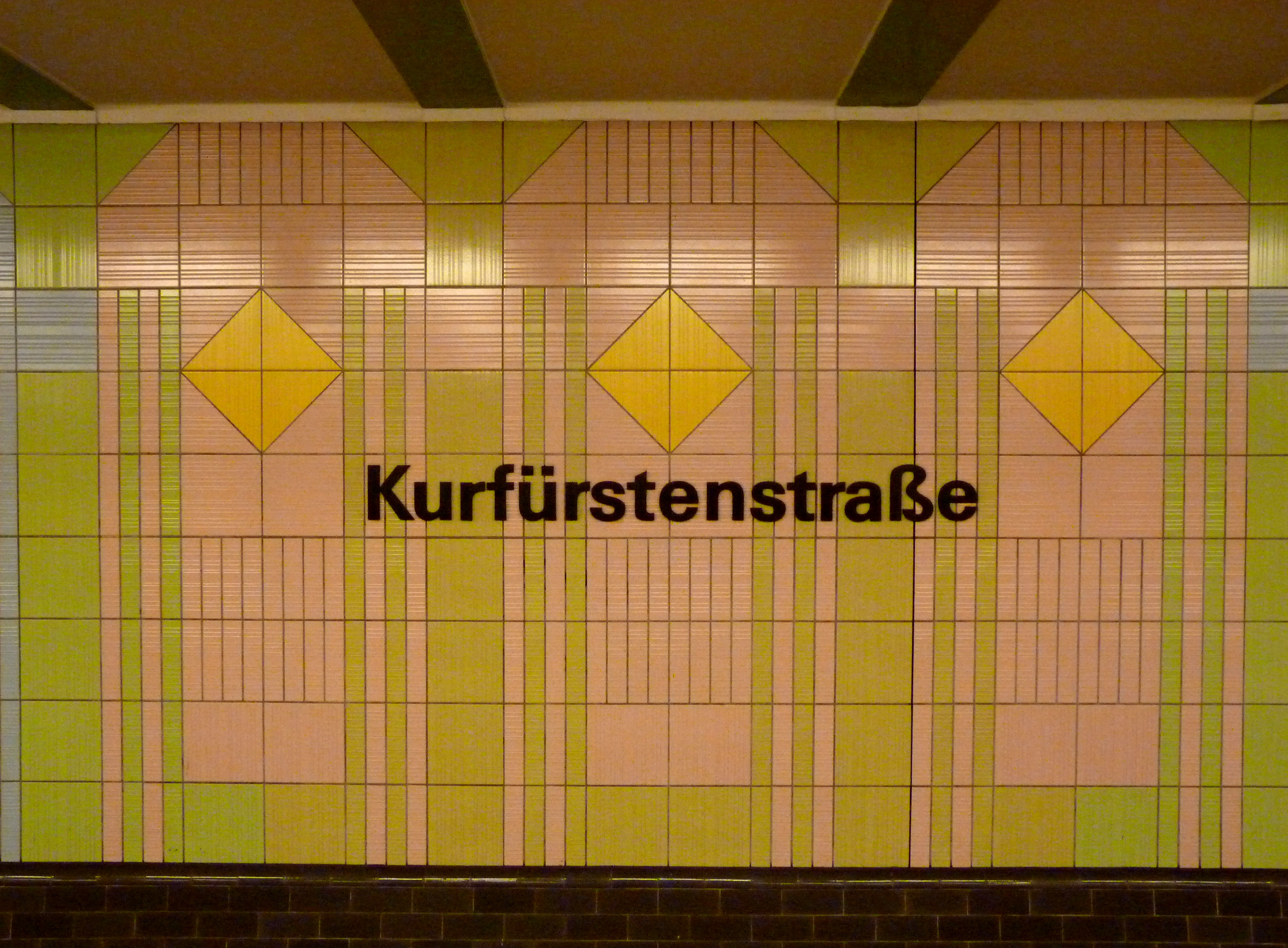
Tile decoration as of 2010
