= Berlin Potsdamer Platz station =

Railway station in Berlin, Germany

Potsdamer Platz
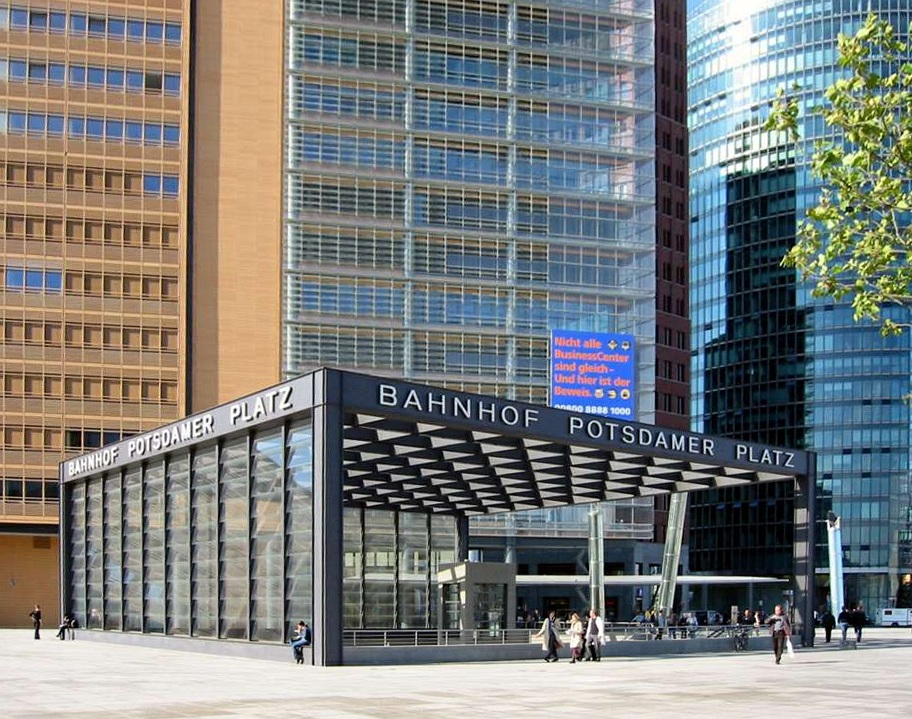

General information
- Location: Potsdamer Platz; 10785 Berlin; Berlin, Berlin; Germany
- Coordinates: 52°30′34″N 13°22′33″E
- Lines: Nord-Süd-Tunnel, North–South mainline
- Platforms: 2 island platforms (North-South mainline); 2 island platforms (S-Bahn); 1 island platform (U-Bahn)
- Tracks: 4 (North-South mainline); 4 (S-Bahn); 2 (U-Bahn)
- Connections: : 200, 300, N2; : M41, M48, M85

Construction
- Structure type: Underground
- Cycle facilities: Yes (Call a Bike, bicycle parking)
- Accessible: Yes

Other information
- Station code: 5016
- DS100 code: BPOF long distance BPOP S-Bahn
- Category: 2
- Fare zone: : Berlin A/5555
- Website: www.bahnhof.de

Services
Preceding station	DB Regio Nordost	Following station
Berlin Hbf Terminus	Flughafen-Express	Berlin Südkreuz towards BER Airport
Berlin Hbf towards Stralsund Hbf or Schwedt	RE 3	Berlin Südkreuz towards Jüterbog or Lutherstadt Wittenberg Hbf
Berlin Hbf towards Rathenow or Stendal Hbf	RE 4	Berlin Südkreuz towards Jüterbog or Falkenberg (Elster)
Berlin Hbf towards Rostock Hbf or Stralsund Hbf	RE 5	Berlin Südkreuz Terminus
Berlin Hbf Terminus	RE 20	Berlin Südkreuz towards Lübbenau (Spreewald) or Cottbus Hbf
Berlin Hbf towards Nauen	RB 10	Berlin Südkreuz towards Rangsdorf
Preceding station	Ostdeutsche Eisenbahn	Following station
Berlin Hbf towards Wismar	RE 8	Berlin Südkreuz towards Elsterwerda
Preceding station	Berlin S-Bahn	Following station
Brandenburger Tor towards Oranienburg	S1	Anhalter Bahnhof towards Wannsee
Brandenburger Tor towards Bernau	S2	Anhalter Bahnhof towards Blankenfelde
Brandenburger Tor towards Hennigsdorf	S25	Anhalter Bahnhof towards Teltow Stadt
Brandenburger Tor towards Blankenburg	S26	Anhalter Bahnhof towards Teltow Stadt
Preceding station	Berlin U-Bahn	Following station
Mendelssohn-Bartholdy-Park towards Ruhleben	U2	Anton-Wilhelm-Amo-Straße towards Pankow
Route map
U2 station
S-Bahn station
Location

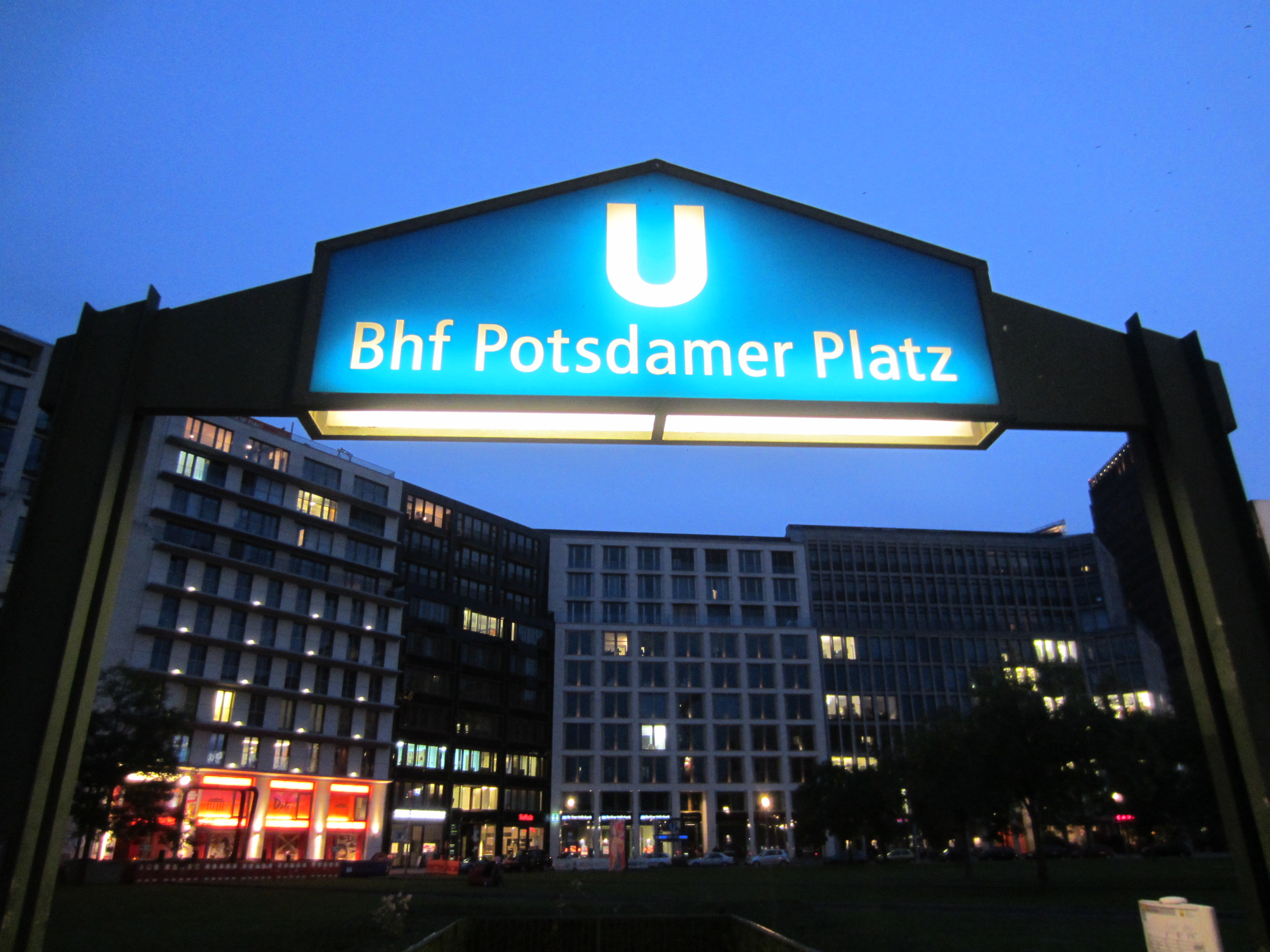
U-Bahn entrance

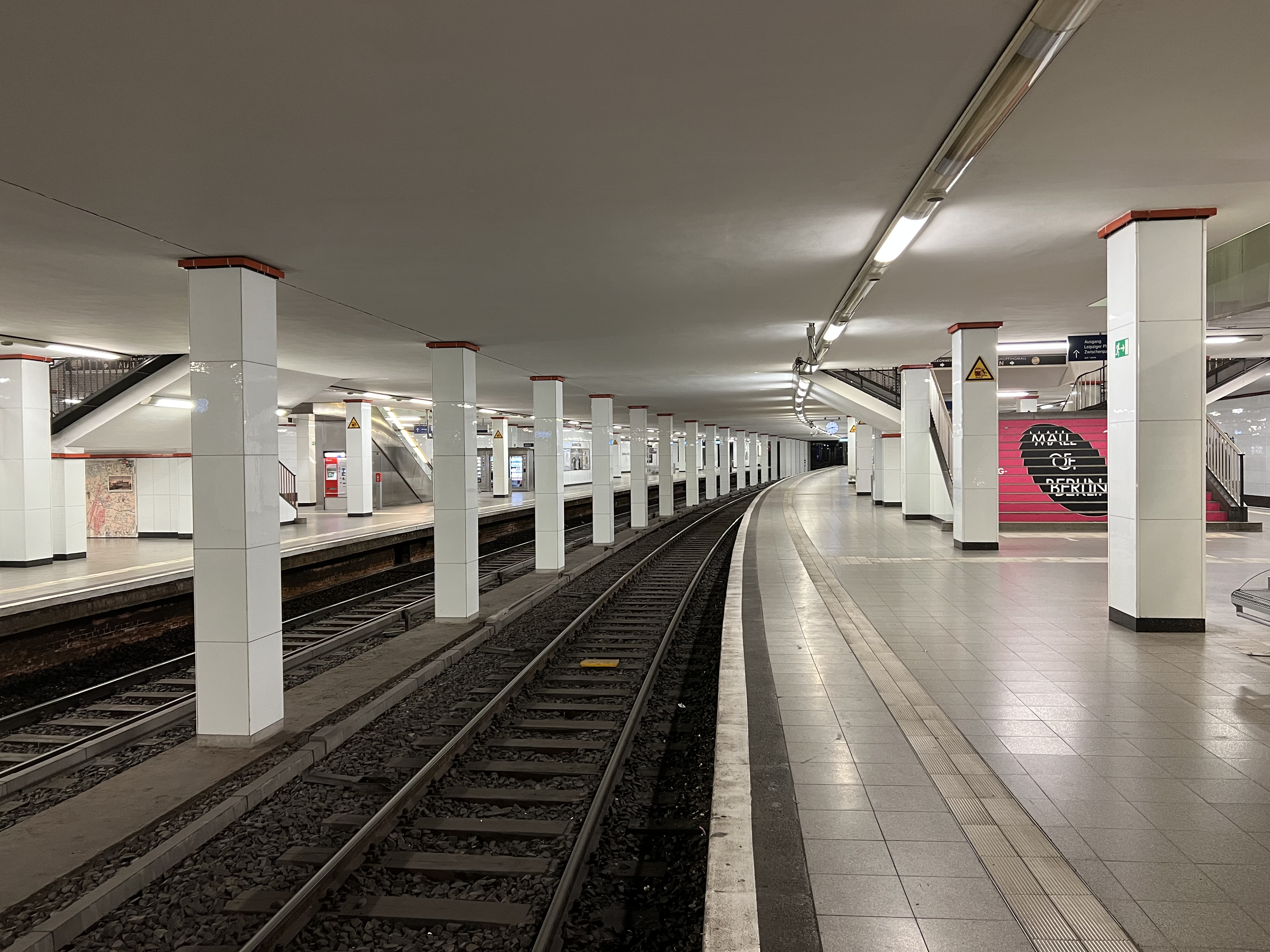
S-Bahn Platform

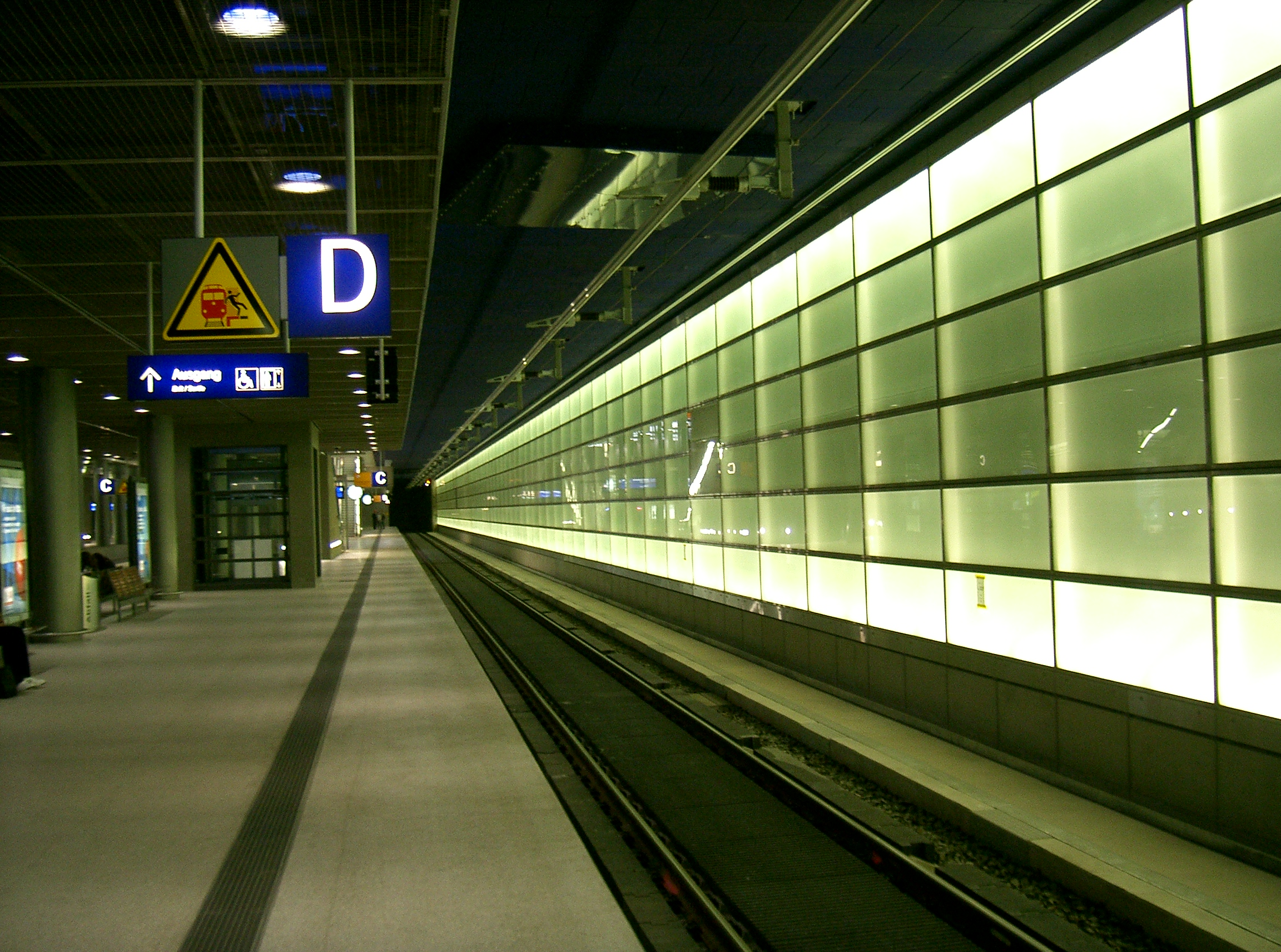
Regional-Express or Deutsche Bahn platform

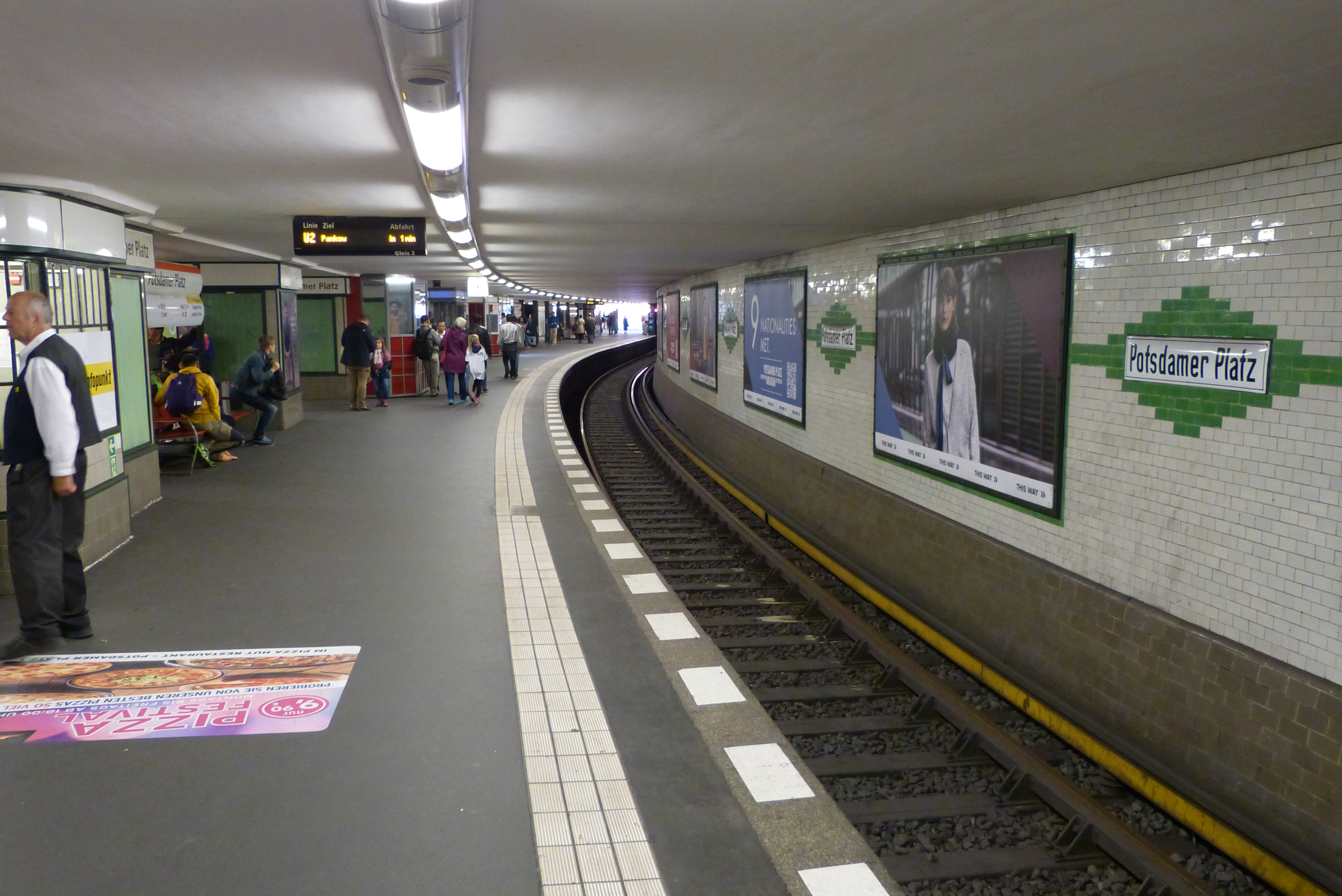
U-Bahn platform

Berlin Potsdamer Platz is a railway station in Berlin. It is completely underground and situated under Potsdamer Platz in central Berlin. Regional and S-Bahn services call at the station, and it is also served by U-Bahn line U2.

== History ==
=== S-Bahn ===
The first station at Potsdamer Platz was the Potsdamer Bahnhof terminus, which was closed on 27 September 1945 due to war damage.

In 1939 the S-Bahn, or Stadtbahn (City Railway), arrived. The idea for a North-South Link rapid transit rail line from Unter den Linden to Yorckstraße, via Potsdamer Platz and Anhalter Bahnhof, had first been mooted in 1914, but it was not planned in detail until 1928, and then approval had to wait until 1933. Begun in 1934, it was plagued with disasters. Determination to have it finished in time for the Berlin Olympic Games in 1936 meant vital safety measures were ignored: on 20 August 1935, a tunnel collapse just south of the Brandenburg Gate buried 23 workmen of whom only four survived; then on 28 December 1936, a fire near the Potsdamer Platz station destroyed vital equipment. Needless to say, the line was not ready for the Berlin Olympics; in fact it was another three years before it first saw public use. In spite of all the setbacks, it was opened from Unter den Linden to Potsdamer Platz on 15 April 1939, extended to Anhalter Bahnhof on 9 October, and then to Yorckstraße, to complete the link, on 6 November. The Potsdamer Platz S-Bahn station also contained an underground shopping arcade, the largest in Europe.

Four platforms were provided at the station, and all were used although just two were planned to suffice: the other two were originally intended to be utilised by another new line, which was to branch off eastwards and run under the city to Görlitzer Bahnhof. A connection from Anhalter Bahnhof was also to be made. Although construction of some tunnel sections went ahead (and these still exist, though are inaccessible to the public), the line was never opened.

During the war, many sections of the U-Bahn and S-Bahn were closed due to enemy action, and the sections through Potsdamer Platz were no exception.

The North-South Link, less than six years old, became the setting for one of the most contentious episodes of the final Battle for Berlin, in late April and early May 1945. On 2 May, the tunnel was flooded as a consequence of the decision of the remaining Nazi leaders to blow up the section of the North-South Tunnel beneath the nearby Landwehrkanal as a desperate measure to slow the Soviet advance. Because of this incident, the North-South Link was unable to be used until 1947 (see below).

Shortly after the war's end, the Ringbahnhof got a reprieve of sorts, temporarily reopening on 6 August 1945 as the terminus of the Wannseebahn trains, while the Nord-Süd-Tunnel received massive repairs (millions of gallons of water had to be pumped out). The Ringbahnhof closed for good on 27 July 1946 after some fragmentary train workings had resumed along the North-South Link on 2 June. Full services recommenced on 16 November 1947, although repairs were not complete until May 1948.

The North-South Link saw a more bizarre - though not unique - state of affairs. This line, plus two U-Bahn lines elsewhere in the city, suffered from a quirk of geography in that they briefly passed through East German territory en route from one part of West Berlin to another. This gave rise to the infamous "Geisterbahnhöfe" (ghost stations), Potsdamer Platz being the most notorious, which were sealed off from the outside world and trains ran straight through without stopping. They would generally slow down, however, affording passengers the strange sight of dusty, dimly lit platforms patrolled by armed guards, there to prevent any East Berliners from trying to escape to the West by train. At the points where the lines passed directly beneath the actual border, concrete "collars" were constructed within the tunnels with just the minimum clearance for trains, to prevent people from clinging to the sides or roof of the coaches.

The station was the last to be reopened, with major refurbishment work included to the entire North South line and the station, with re-coating/repainting of the station and huge removal of wartime flood damage, on 3 March 1992. Major refurbishment began to be carried out in January 1991.

=== U-Bahn ===
The U-Bahn, or Untergrundbahn (underground railway), was a major revolution in Berlin's public transport, and the forerunner of similar systems now seen in several German cities. The underground sections alternated with sections elevated above ground on viaducts – hence the alternative name Hochbahn (literally "high railway"). The first line (now part of line U1) ran from Stralauer Tor to Potsdamer Platz. Begun on 10 September 1896 and opened on 18 February 1902, the actual Potsdamer Platz station was rather poorly sited. Though it was reached via an entrance right outside the main-line terminus, people then had to walk about 200 metres (660 ft) along an underground passage beneath the appropriately named Bahnstraße (Railway Street). It was built by Swedish architect Grenander in 1902, and it was supposed to be named Potsdamer Bahnhof, or Potsdamer Ringbahnhof, but after 5 years the station was relocated 180m to the southwest at Leipziger Platz.

Later that year, the system was developed into a through line running from Warschauer Brücke to Knie, which actually placed Potsdamer Platz on a branch accessed via a triangle of lines (Gleisdreieck) between the Möckernbrücke and Bülowstraße stations near the current Gleisdreieck station. The first Potsdamer Platz U-Bahn station saw use for just over five and a half years, until its inconvenient site, and the desire to reach other parts of the city, enabled it to be superseded by a better sited new station on an extension of the line to Spittelmarkt. The new station opened first, on 29 September 1907, and the rest of the extension to Spittelmarkt on 1 October 1908 (evidence of the original station's site can still be seen in the tunnel, from passing trains). As the new station lay mostly beneath the adjoining Leipziger Platz, this is what the station was initially called, being renamed Potsdamer Platz on 29 January 1923.

The station was one of a number designed by the Swedish architect Alfred Frederik Elias Grenander (1863–1931). From a technical point of view, its construction was something of a challenge, as aboveground the Hotel Furstenhof was being rebuilt at the same time. The U-Bahn line extension and new station ran right through the hotel's basement, cutting it in half. Contrary to several sources, the hotel did not however enjoy a separate entrance directly from the station. The enormous Wertheim Department Store in nearby Leipziger Straße did enjoy such an entrance, as in later years did the Hotel Excelsior from the Anhalter Bahnhof.

Until 1923 the station was known as Leipziger Platz. From then the name was Potsdamer Platz.

The station was closed from 13 August 1961 to 13 November 1993 when Berlin was separated by Berlin Wall. A border fortification was placed near Potsdamer Platz station. This border fortification was removed in December 1990. It was imagined that trains on either side would simply run as far as the last stop before the border and then reverse back. This was partly the case with the U-Bahn line through Potsdamer Platz, as in October 1991, the Mohrenstraße (now renamed Anton-Wilhelm-Amo-Straße station) station operationally became a terminus for trains on the eastern side. On the western side however, the entire section all the way back to Wittenbergplatz was closed completely and at least partially dismantled. Indeed, two of the abandoned stations on this section, Bülowstraße and Nollendorfplatz, were converted into markets. The antiques market at the latter was housed in sixteen old wooden coaches lined up beside the platforms, while another coach even carried passengers back and forth to Bülowstraße where a Turkish bazaar was sited.

This station was intended to be an interchange with the future driverless line U3 and U10, and a shell was built for a side platform station above the S-Bahn platforms in 2006 during major renovation works.

=== M-Bahn ===
In the latter years of the Wall's existence, part of the abandoned U-Bahn section, the stretch between Gleisdreieck and Potsdamer Platz, was used by the M-Bahn (Magnetic Levitation Railway). Instead of diving underground as before, once it crossed over the Landwehrkanal, it remained above ground on a lengthy elevated structure supported on steel columns which curved across the Potsdamer Bahnhof's former site to end at a terminus of its own at Kemper Platz, very near the Philharmonie (Philharmonic Hall, home of the Berlin Philharmonic Orchestra).

As early as the late 1970s the West Berlin government had discussed introducing such a system to the city, particularly a section linking Tegel Airport with the centre. The go-ahead was finally given for the building of a test track at Potsdamer Platz on 2 December 1980, with a ground-breaking ceremony taking place on 16 June 1983. Construction started in earnest in December 1983 and the first test runs occurred in June 1984. This required a direct link for those people staying in the western part of Potsdamer Platz as there was no rail connection to Gleisdreieck. Five years of intensive testing followed, not without incident. On 18 April 1987 an arson attack at Gleisdreieck destroyed two cars, while a more spectacular mishap occurred on 19 December 1988 when a train with badly adjusted brakes ran through the end wall of the Kemperplatz terminus, much to the amusement of the local press. However, with some spare cars pressed into service, the line, just 1.6 km (0.99 mi) in length, was opened to the public on 28 August 1989, although it did not really run from anywhere to anywhere. Nevertheless, it was regarded as an interesting curiosity and was quite heavily used on that basis, although it was to be short-lived. The station in the western part of Potsdamer Platz was called Kemperplatz.

Less than three months later the Wall came down, which afforded the opportunity to restore the U-Bahn and S-Bahn, thus rendering the M-Bahn redundant. It was closed on 18 July 1991; stripping out of the electrical system began on 31 July, followed by dismantling of the track and the elevated steel deck between September 1991 and January 1992 to make way for the U2 to be reinstated. Today there is nothing left to show that it ever existed. Similarly it was decided not to proceed with any M-Bahn plans elsewhere in the city. The possibility of going ahead with the line to Tegel Airport resurfaced periodically, but since the airport itself closed in 2020, these plans have been consigned to history.

=== Regional Trains ===
A regional rail station on the north–south line built as part of the Berlin Hauptbahnhof Project, was opened in 2006. This station is on the four-track north–south connection of long-distance and regional traffic between the stations Hauptbahnhof and Südkreuz.

The station is 260 meters long, 50 meters wide and (at track level) 20 meters below street level, has two island platforms on the four tracks. Regional Express trains on lines RE 3, RE 4 and RE 5 currently stop at Potsdamer Platz regional station.

Traffic forecasts before the opening assumed 80,000 passengers per day, including 50,000 exiting or entering and around 30,000 people transferring to the underground and S-Bahn.

Construction work was to begin in 1995. Completion of the shell was planned for spring 1997, and the interior work was to follow between 1997 and 1999. The opening of the station was planned for 2002. By mid-2002 it was planned to open the station at the end of 2005, half a year before the planned opening of Berlin Hauptbahnhof. The station was finally opened on May 28, 2006.

Since upgrades on the Berlin Dresden railway, the airport express (FEX) runs via Potsdamer Platz.

The planned rebuild of the trunk line will reconnect Potsdamer Platz with Potsdam.

== Train services ==
In the 2026 timetable, the following lines stop at the station:

Line	Route		Frequency
FEX	Airport Express; Berlin Hbf – Berlin Potsdamer Platz – Berlin Südkreuz – BER Airport		Every 15 mins
RE 3	Lutherstadt Wittenberg – Jüterbog – Ludwigsfelde – Berlin Potsdamer Platz – Eberswalde – Angermünde –	Schwedt (Oder)	Hourly
RE 3	Lutherstadt Wittenberg – Jüterbog – Ludwigsfelde – Berlin Potsdamer Platz – Eberswalde – Angermünde –	Prenzlau – Greifswald – Stralsund	Hourly
RE 4	(Falkenberg (Elster) –) Jüterbog – Ludwigsfelde – Berlin Potsdamer Platz – Berlin-Spandau – Dallgow-Döberitz – Wustermark – Rathenow (– Stendal)		Hourly
RE 5	Berlin Südkreuz – Berlin Potsdamer Platz – Berlin Gesundbrunnen – Oranienburg – Neustrelitz –	Güstrow – Rostock	Hourly
RE 5	Berlin Südkreuz – Berlin Potsdamer Platz – Berlin Gesundbrunnen – Oranienburg – Neustrelitz –	Neubrandenburg – Stralsund	Hourly
RE 8	Wismar – Schwerin – Ludwigslust – Berlin-Spandau – Berlin Hauptbahnhof – Berlin Potsdamer Platz – Berlin Südkreuz – Wünsdorf-Waldstadt – Luckau-Uckro – Doberlug-Kirchhain – Elsterwerda		Hourly
RE 20	Berlin Hbf – Potsdamer Platz – Südkreuz – BER Airport – Königs Wusterhausen – Lübbenau (Spreewald) (– Vetschau – Cottbus)		Hourly
RB 10	Rangsdorf – Blankenfelde – Berlin Südkreuz – Berlin Potsdamer Platz – Berlin Hauptbahnhof – Berlin Jungfernheide – Berlin-Spandau – Falkensee – Nauen		Hourly
As of 14 December 2025

- Berlin S-Bahn services Oranienburg - Wittenau - Gesundbrunnen - Friedrichstraße - Potsdamer Platz - Schöneberg - Steglitz - Wannsee
- Berlin S-Bahn services Bernau - Karow - Pankow - Gesundbrunnen - Friedrichstraße - Potsdamer Platz - Sudkreuz - Blankenfelde
- Berlin S-Bahn services Hennigsdorf - Tegel - Gesundbrunnen - Friedrichstraße - Potsdamer Platz - Sudkreuz - Lichterfelde - Teltow
- Berlin S-Bahn services Blankenburg - Pankow - Gesundbrunnen - Friedrichstraße - Potsdamer Platz - Sudkreuz - Lichterfelde - Teltow
