= Gleisdreieck station =

Berlin U-Bahn station

Gleisdreieck
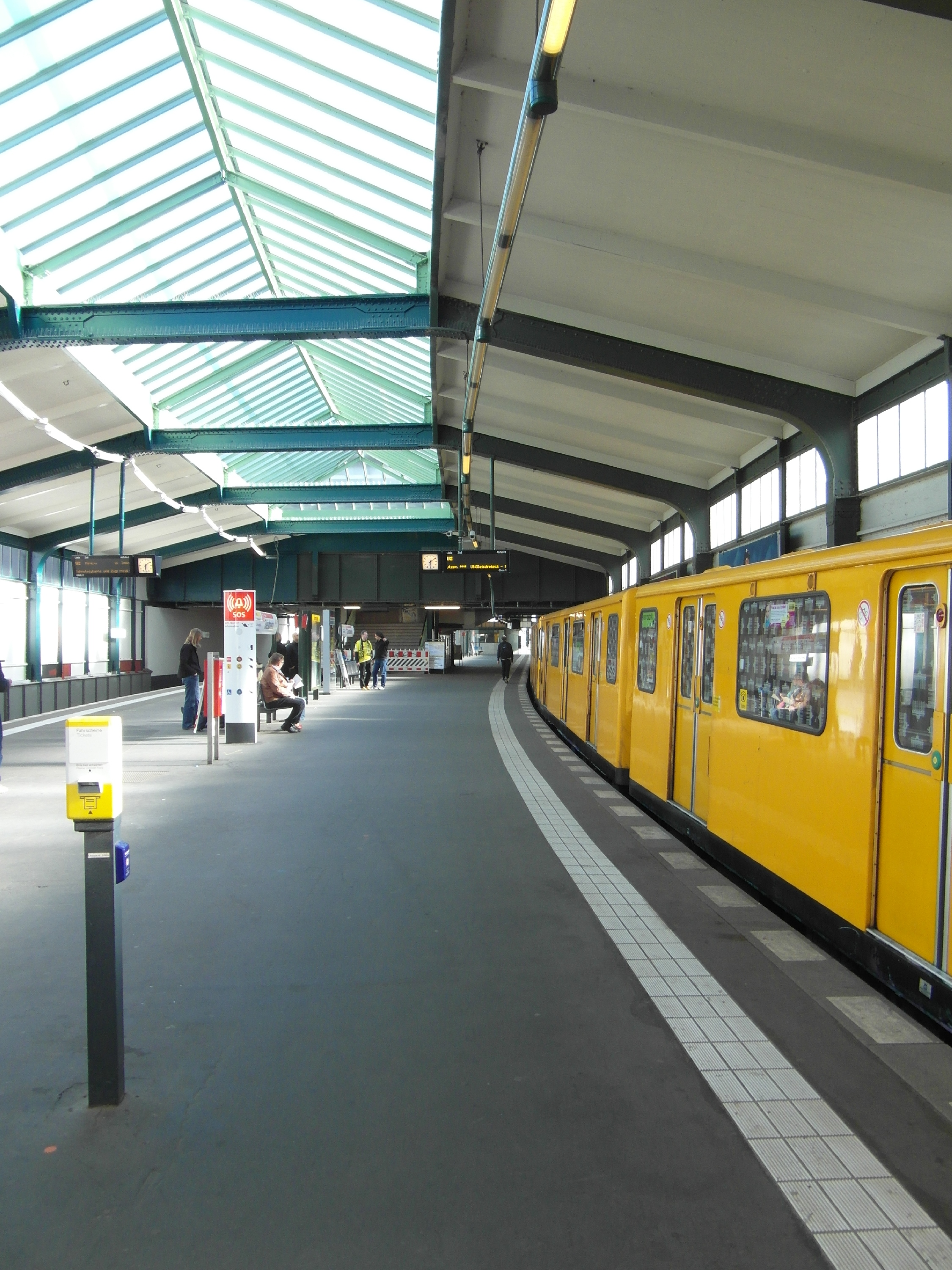

General information
- Location: Luckenwalder Straße; Kreuzberg, Berlin; Germany
- Coordinates: 52°29′54″N 13°22′31″E
- Owner: Berliner Verkehrsbetriebe
- Operator: Berliner Verkehrsbetriebe
- Platforms: 2 island platforms
- Tracks: 4

Construction
- Structure type: Elevated
- Parking: Yes
- Cycle facilities: Yes
- Accessible: Yes

Other information
- Fare zone: : Berlin A/5555

History
- Opened: 1912/1913

Services
Preceding station	Berlin U-Bahn	Following station
Kurfürstenstraße towards Uhlandstraße	U1	Möckernbrücke towards Warschauer Straße
Bülowstraße towards Ruhleben	U2	Mendelssohn-Bartholdy-Park towards Pankow
Kurfürstenstraße towards Krumme Lanke	U3	Möckernbrücke towards Warschauer Straße
Track layout
Location
- Location within Berlin

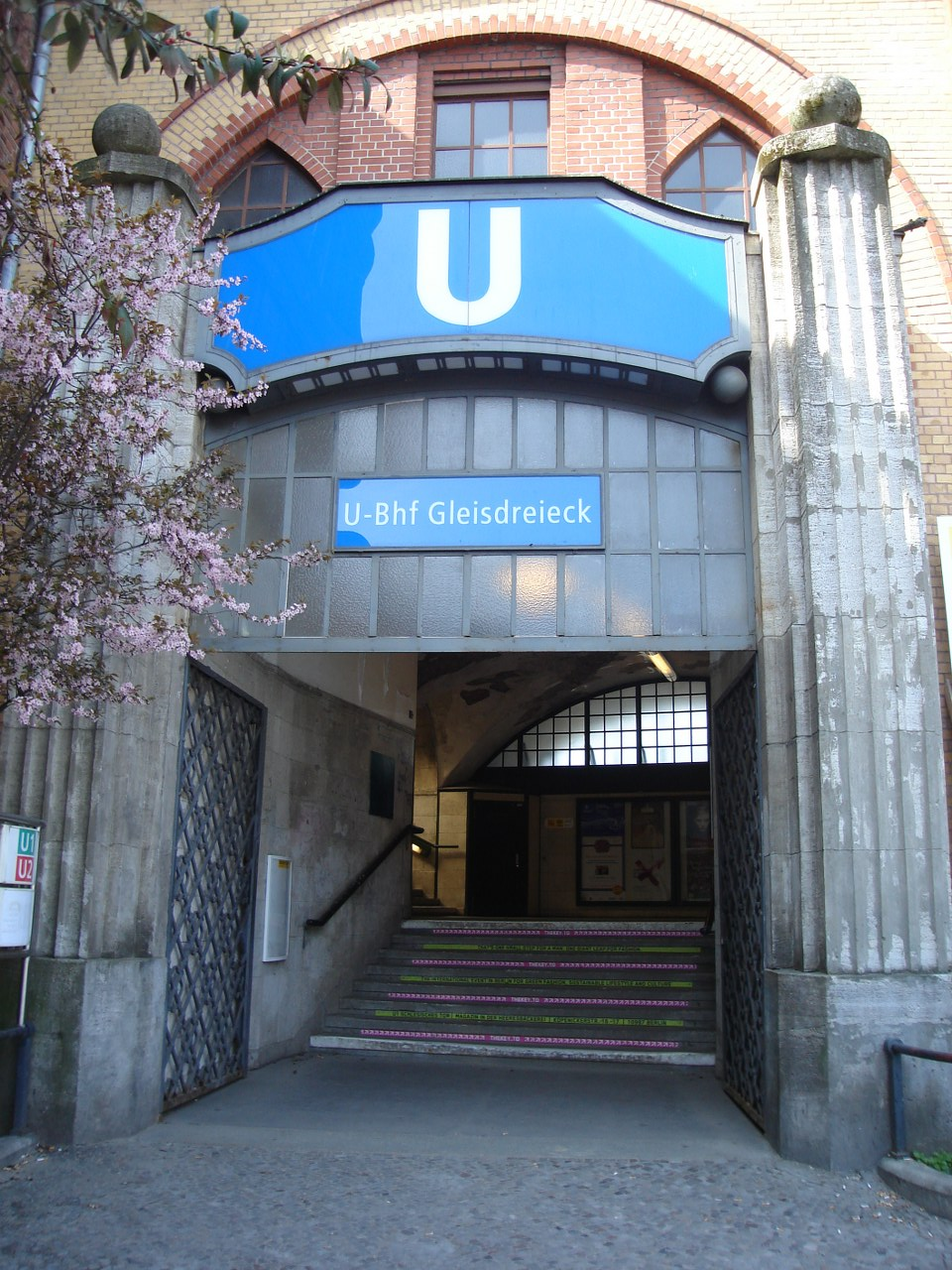
Entrance

Gleisdreieck is an elevated Berlin U-Bahn station located on a viaduct in the Kreuzberg district, and served by lines U1, U2, and U3. The U1/U3 platform is at a higher level than, and perpendicular to, that of the U2.

== Overview ==
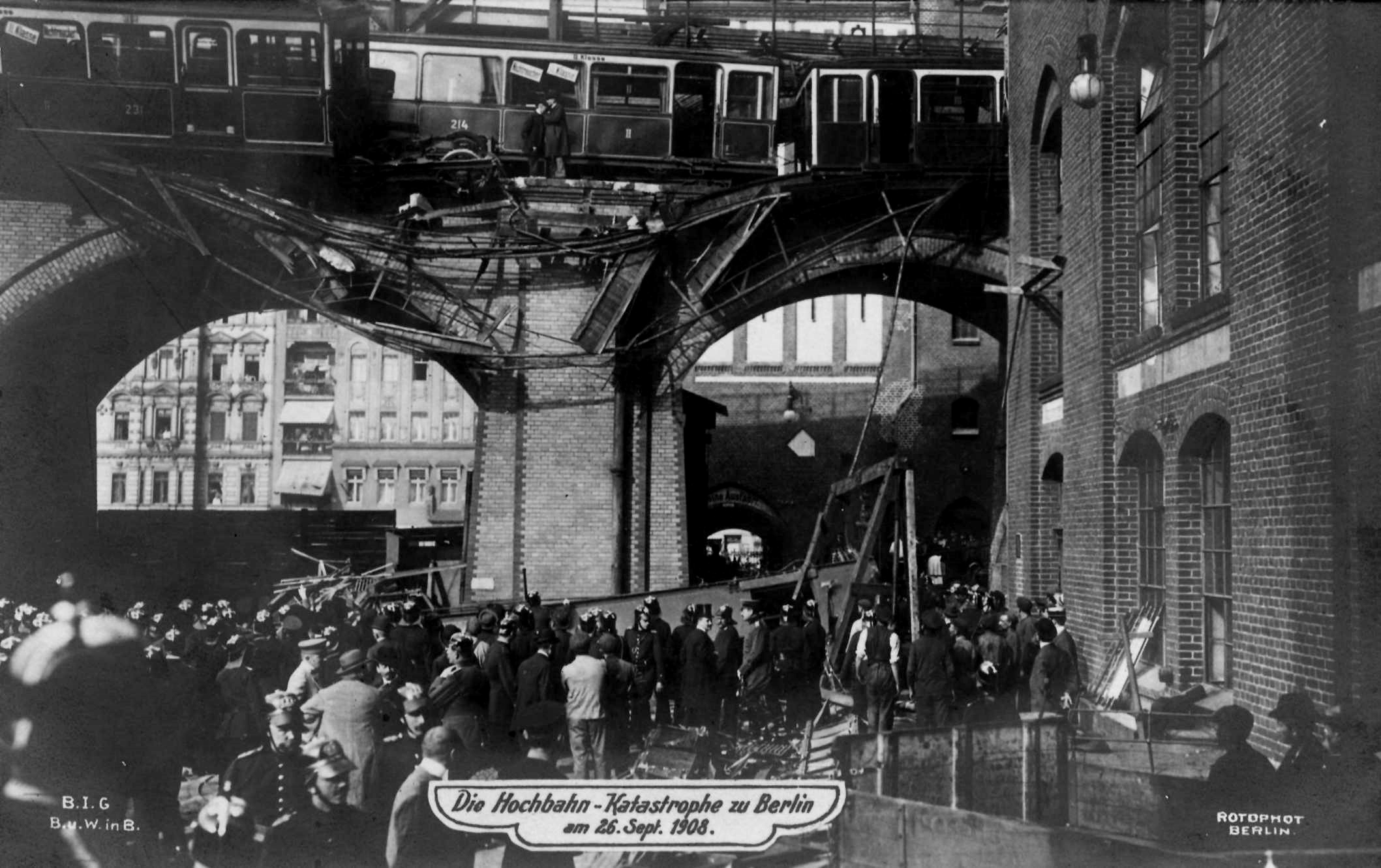
Gleisdreieck accident, 1908

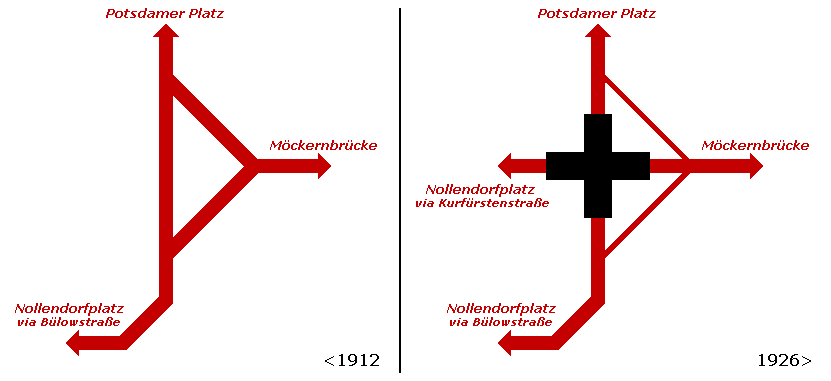
Gleisdreieck before and after the reconstruction

The station's name literally means "track triangle," or wye in English, and marks the spot of an earlier major train hub that opened in 1902, where the three branches of the first Stammstrecke U-Bahn line from Zoologischer Garten, Potsdamer Platz and Warschauer Brücke met. A major accident at the triangle happened on 26 September 1908, when two trains collided. One car derailed and fell from the viaduct, killing 18 people and injuring 21. Upon another dangerous incident, the single-level triangle from 1912 was rebuilt and replaced by the current two-level station. Since then there is no direct rail connection between the two lines at Gleisdreieck, but only an intersection.

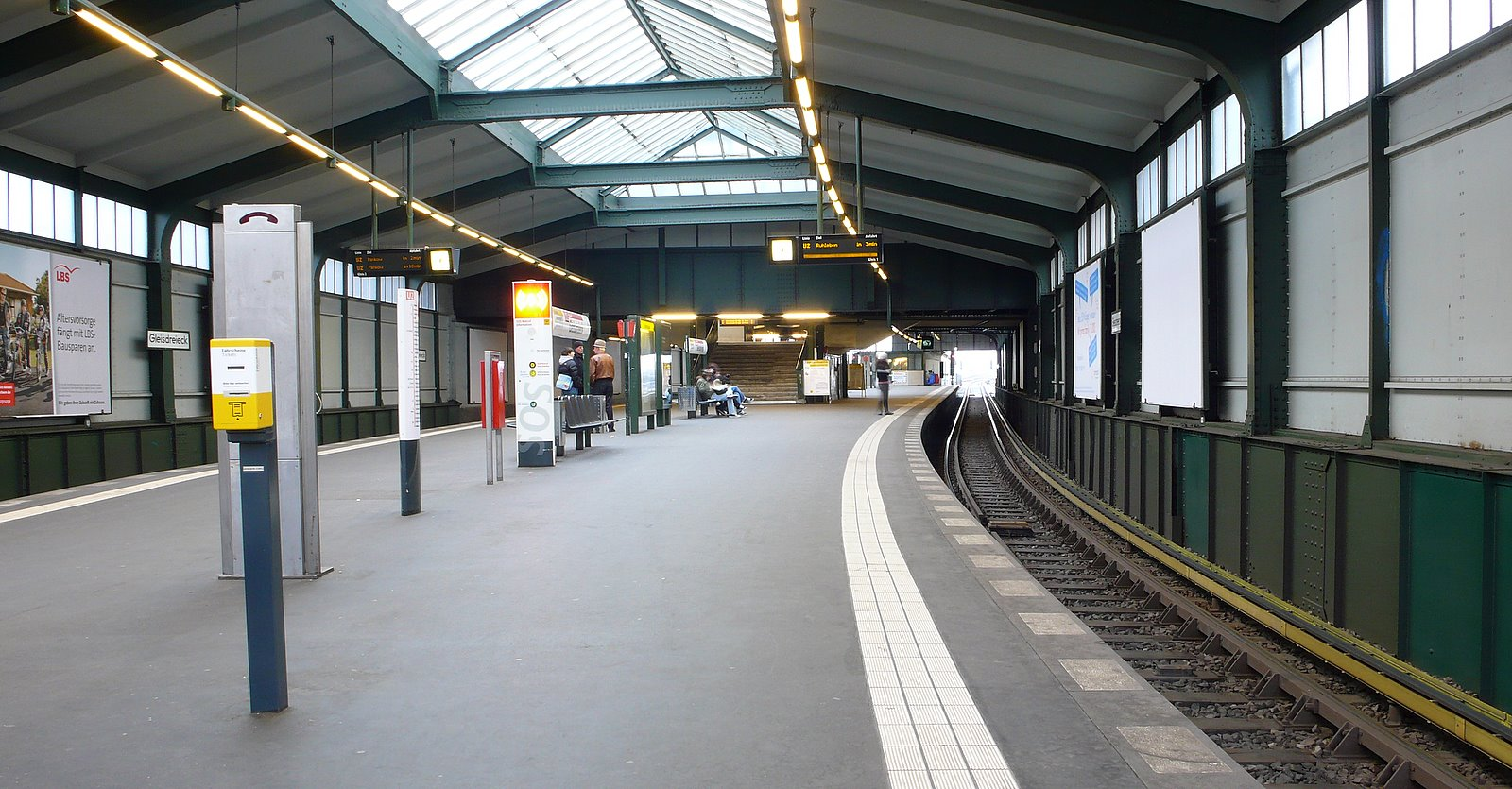
Lower U2 platform

In 1939 the North-South Tunnel was opened in the vicinity, though there is no interchange with the S-Bahn system.

On 28–29 January 1944, the viaduct suffered heavy bombing, and on 14 February 1945, there were additional serious bombing impacts causing heavy air pressure damage to the station's steel construction. It took a direct hit on 3 February 1945, destroying a train. On 11–12 March 1945, the signal box was destroyed, and on 18 March 1945, the upper platform was destroyed. A viaduct was totally destroyed in the Battle of Berlin.

After the building of the Berlin Wall beginning 13 August 1961, the lower platform became the eastern terminus of the U2, until service was finally discontinued on 1 January 1972. Between 1984 and 1991 it served as the southern terminus of the short-lived M-Bahn maglev running to Kemperplatz near the Philharmonie. The U2 train service on the lower platform was restarted on 13 November 1993. It is the westernmost station in Kreuzberg for both lines.

The German Museum of Technology (Deutsches Technikmuseum) is adjacent to the station. The name Gleisdreieck also refers to a large area in the south, the former freight yards of the Anhalter and Potsdamer Bahnhof, which have been redeveloped as an urban park, known as the Park am Gleisdreieck.

=== The new Gleisdreieck ===
One of the most dangerous places of the entire U-Bahn network was found at the triangular rail junction at Gleisdreieck, which connected the main line between Warschauer Brücke and Zoologischer Garten with the branch line to Potsdamer Platz. This branch was protected only by signals, so that driver inattention could easily lead to a disaster, as happened on 26 September 1908. An U-Bahn train ran into the side of another train, forcing two carriages off the track. One carriage fell over the viaduct and 21 passengers died. As a result, it was decided to change the configuration at Gleisdreieck.

Construction began in May 1912 to replace the triangular junction with two lines built as a grade-separated cross with a new Gleisdreieck interchange station at the intersection. These lines now form part of U1 and U2. The new work was carried out largely with full services operating, although services were briefly interrupted on each line. On 3 November 1912, the new Gleisdreieck station was opened but construction was not completed until August 1913. The connecting track from the Pankow direction to the Warschauer Straße direction continued to be open until the completion of work for use by construction supply trains.

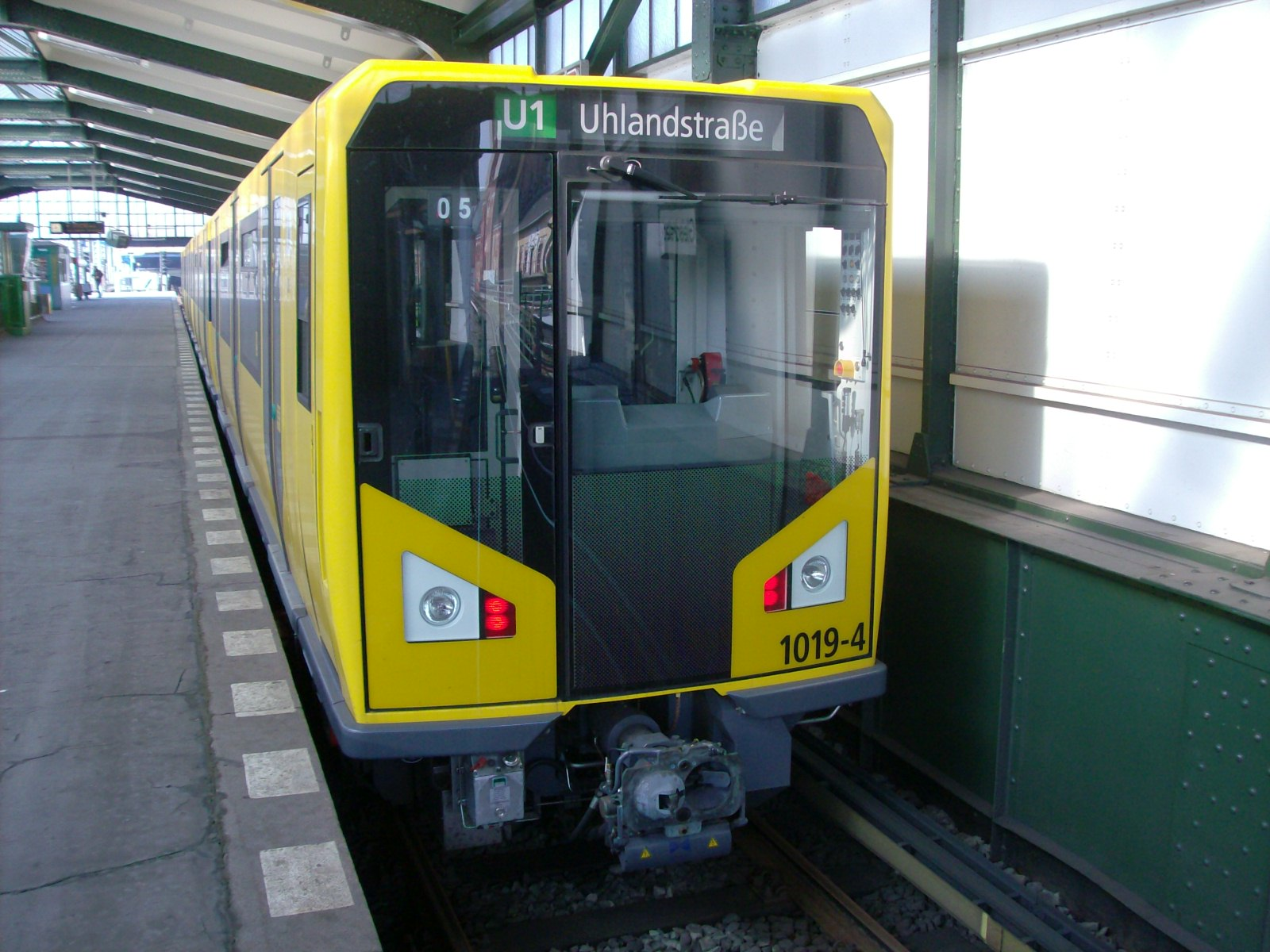
Upper U1/U3 platform, modern HK train departing to Uhlandstraße
