= M-Bahn =

Berlin magnetic levitation train

Berlin M-Bahn

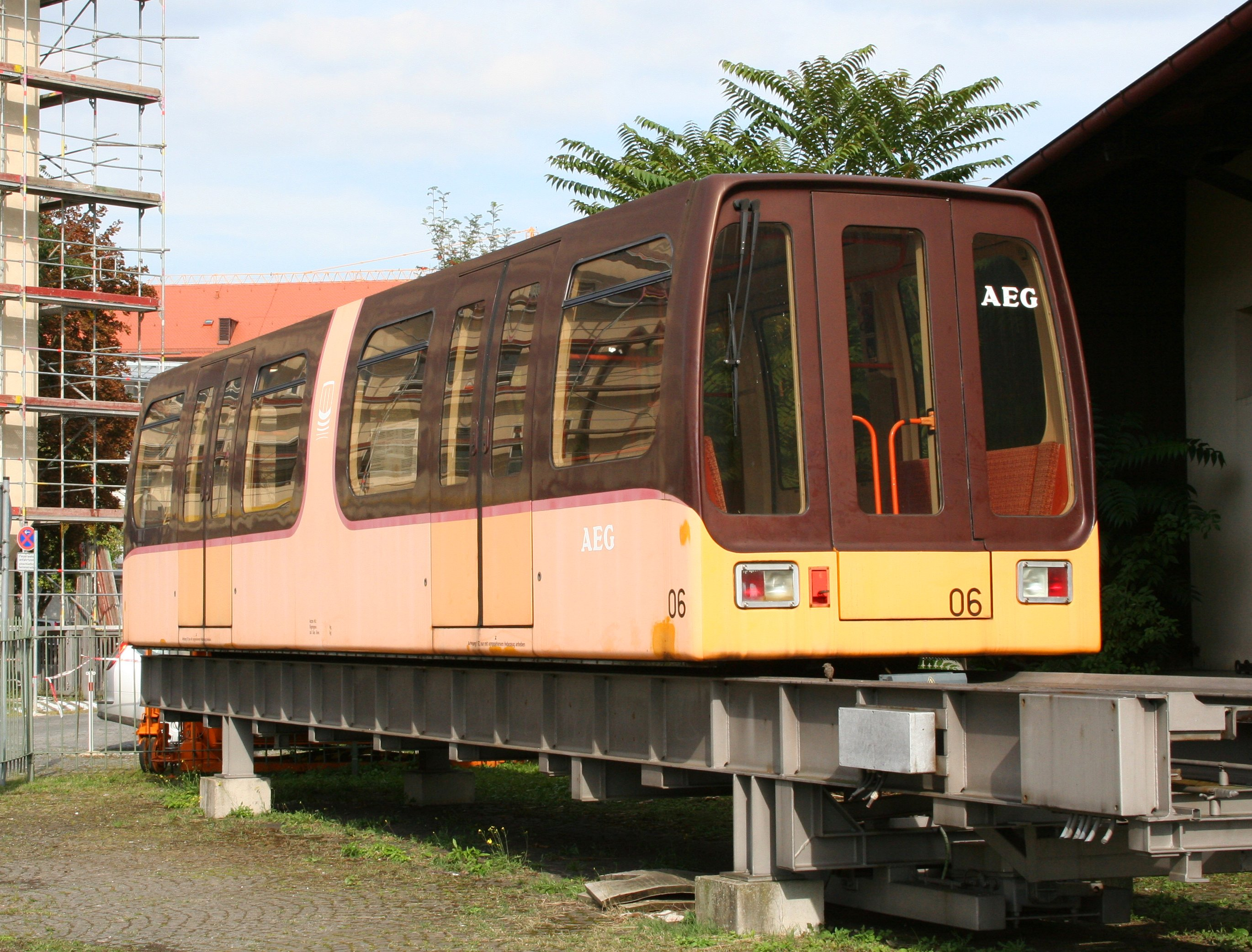
- M-Bahn train 06 at the Nuremberg Transport Museum

Overview
- Status: dismantled
- Owner: Magnetbahn GmbH
- Locale: Berlin, West Germany
- Termini: Gleisdreieck; Kemperplatz
- Stations: 3

Service
- Type: Maglev
- System: AEG Rail Systems
- Rolling stock: 1× M70/2; 6× M80/2; 1× maintenance vehicle

History
- Opened: August 28, 1989; 37 years ago (testing); July 18, 1991; 35 years ago (service)
- Closed: July 31, 1991; 35 years ago (closed); September 17, 1991; 35 years ago (dismantled)

Technical
- Line length: 1.6 km (1.0 mi)
- Number of tracks: Single/Double track
- Character: Elevated metro
- Operating speed: 80 km/h (50 mph)

The M-Bahn or Magnetbahn was an elevated Maglev train line operating in Berlin, Germany, experimentally from 1984 and in passenger operation from 1989 to 1991. The line was 1.6 kilometres (1 mi) in length, and featured three stations, two of which were newly constructed. Presumed to be the future of rail transit in Berlin, the line was built to fill a gap in the West Berlin public transport network created by the construction of the Berlin Wall. It was rendered redundant by the reunification of Berlin and was closed to enable reconstruction of the U2 line.

The M-Bahn was the second Maglev line to open to public traffic, after the Birmingham Maglev but before the Shanghai maglev train. Construction and running were undertaken by Magnetbahn GmbH.

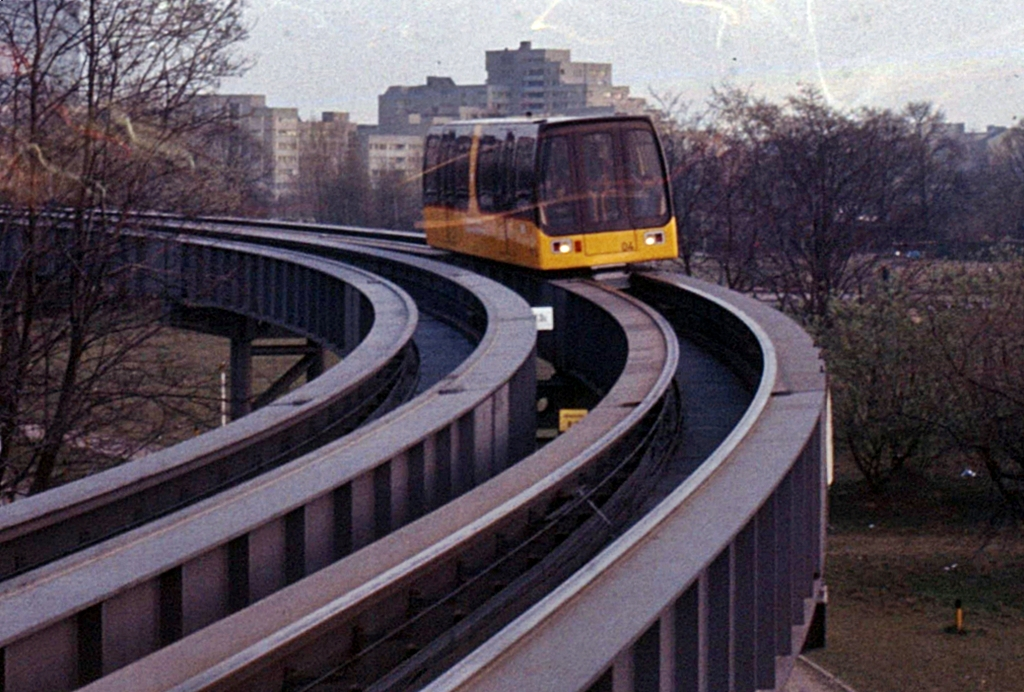
1990 04 Berlin M Bahn 1

== History ==
The first section of the Berlin U-Bahn to be built included an elevated section between Gleisdreieck and Potsdamer Platz stations. After the partition of Berlin, Gleisdreieck station was in West Berlin whilst Potsdamer Platz station was directly under the border to East Berlin. After the building of the Berlin Wall in 1961, the trains from both sides terminated at the last station before Potsdamer Platz (from the East: Anton-Wilhelm-Amo-Straße). Around 1972 also the two stations before Potsdamer Platz, on the western side, closed, because the area served by these stations was also served by another U-Bahn line.

The area of West Berlin adjacent to Potsdamer Platz then required a connection to the U-Bahn, and this need was eventually met by the construction of the M-Bahn, which used the abandoned U-Bahn platforms at Gleisdreieck and the U-Bahn tracks northwards towards the border. It then diverged slightly to the west to terminate close to Potsdamer Platz but still in West Berlin.

Work on the line started in 1983, and the first test runs, without passengers, took place in June 1984 on the southern section of the line. Initial testing used a car previously used on Magnetbahn GmbH's test track near Brunswick, and the first two cars specifically built for Berlin were delivered in late 1986. The original intention was for public service to start in May 1987, but a fire at Gleisdreieck Station in April of that year destroyed one of the two cars and badly damaged the other.

Eventually four more cars, of the same design as the original two, were built. Several planned opening dates were not met, and in December 1988, a test train failed to stop at Kemperplatz and one of the cars crashed to the ground and was destroyed. A public service eventually started in August 1989, although service was intermittent and not guaranteed, and fares were not charged. Official regular passenger service, as part of Berlin's integrated public transport system, started in July 1991.

By this time the Berlin Wall had fallen, something that could not have been predicted when construction started. It became desirable to re-establish the U-Bahn line that had previously been severed, requiring the removal of the M-Bahn from its right of way. The principal need for the M-Bahn had also been removed, as the area served by it was again easily accessible from the Potsdamer Platz station. Dismantling of the M-Bahn started only two months after its official opening, and was completed during February 1992. The U-Bahn connection between Gleisdreieck and Potsdamer Platz Stations was reinstated, becoming part of line U2.

== Route ==
M-Bahn line

The line ran approximately north-south from a station at Kemperplatz on the edge of the Tiergarten park, with three stations in total, the most southernly being on the lower level of the present-day Gleisdreieck U-Bahn interchange.

- Kemperplatz 52°30′40″N 13°22′18″E (now the location of the Sony Center at Potsdamer Platz, close to the present Berlin Potsdamer Platz railway station)
- Bernburger Str. 52°30′20″N 13°22′33″E (close to the present site of Mendelssohn-Bartholdy-Park U-Bahn station)
- Gleisdreieck 52°29′59″N 13°22′27″E (now reclaimed for its original U-Bahn use)

The new section from Kemperplatz and through Bernburger Str. was double track with two parallel guideways, narrowing to single track between Bernburger and Gleisdreieck as it transferred onto the existing U-Bahn viaducts. The M-Bahn guideway used the western side of the viaducts approaching and into the single platform at Gleisdreieck, with standard gauge railway track remaining on the eastern side.

Both Kemperplatz and Bernburger Str. stations have since been demolished, along with structure carrying the M-Bahn between them.

== Rolling stock ==
The M-Bahn operated a total of eight cars, although not all were used in public service.

Car	Type	Builder	In service	Notes
01	M80/2	Waggon Union	March 1987	Destroyed in fire April 1987
02	M80/2	Waggon Union	March 1987	Damaged in fire April 1987 and subsequently withdrawn
03	M80/2	Waggon Union	May 1987	Destroyed in accident December 1988
04	M80/2	Waggon Union	May 1987	Withdrawn September 1991
05		MBB	April 1984	Diesel propelled works car, no magnetic drive, removed 1986
06	M80/2	Waggon Union	August 1989	Withdrawn September 1991, preserved at the Nuremberg Transport Museum
07	M80/2	Waggon Union	August 1989	Withdrawn September 1991
704	M70/2	MBB	June 1984	Built in 1978 for the Brunswick test track, used for initial testing in Berlin until October 1986

== Technology ==
For propulsion, the M-Bahn used a long stator linear motor. However, unlike the Transrapid and other magnetic levitation trains, only 85% of the M-Bahn vehicle weight was supported by magnetic levitation, with the balance being supported by traditional wheels.

During operation, the Berlin M-Bahn line ran as an automated driverless operation, although the system had been designed to be driven by a human driver if required.

A cross-over existed just south of Kemperplatz, to allow use of double-track running. The M-Bahn train was supported across the points by a length of traditional rail below the guideway to support it across the gap.

== In media ==
The disused elevated track features at some length as a backdrop in Wim Wenders's 1987 film Wings of Desire.
