= Mendelssohn-Bartholdy-Park station =

Station of the Berlin U-Bahn

Mendelssohn-Bartholdy-Park
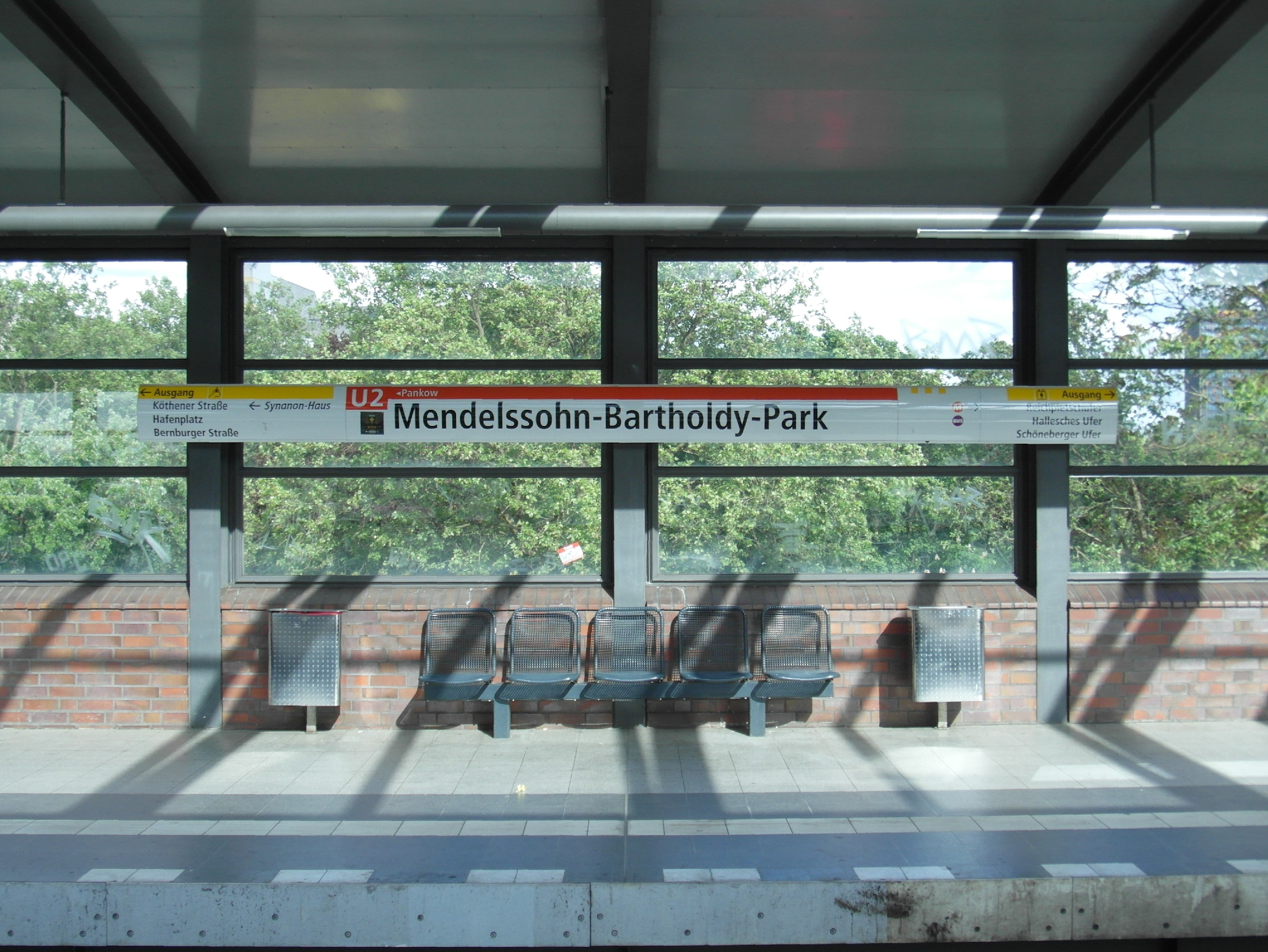

General information
- Location: Mendelssohn-Bartholdy-Park; Tiergarten, Berlin; Germany
- Coordinates: 52°30′14″N 13°22′30″E
- Owner: Berliner Verkehrsbetriebe
- Operator: Berliner Verkehrsbetriebe
- Platforms: 2 side platforms
- Tracks: 2
- Connections: : N1; : M29

Construction
- Structure type: Elevated
- Cycle facilities: Yes
- Accessible: Yes

Other information
- Fare zone: : Berlin A/5555

History
- Opened: 2 October 1998; 28 years ago

Services
Preceding station	Berlin U-Bahn	Following station
Gleisdreieck towards Ruhleben	U2	Potsdamer Platz towards Pankow
Route map
Location
- Location within Berlin

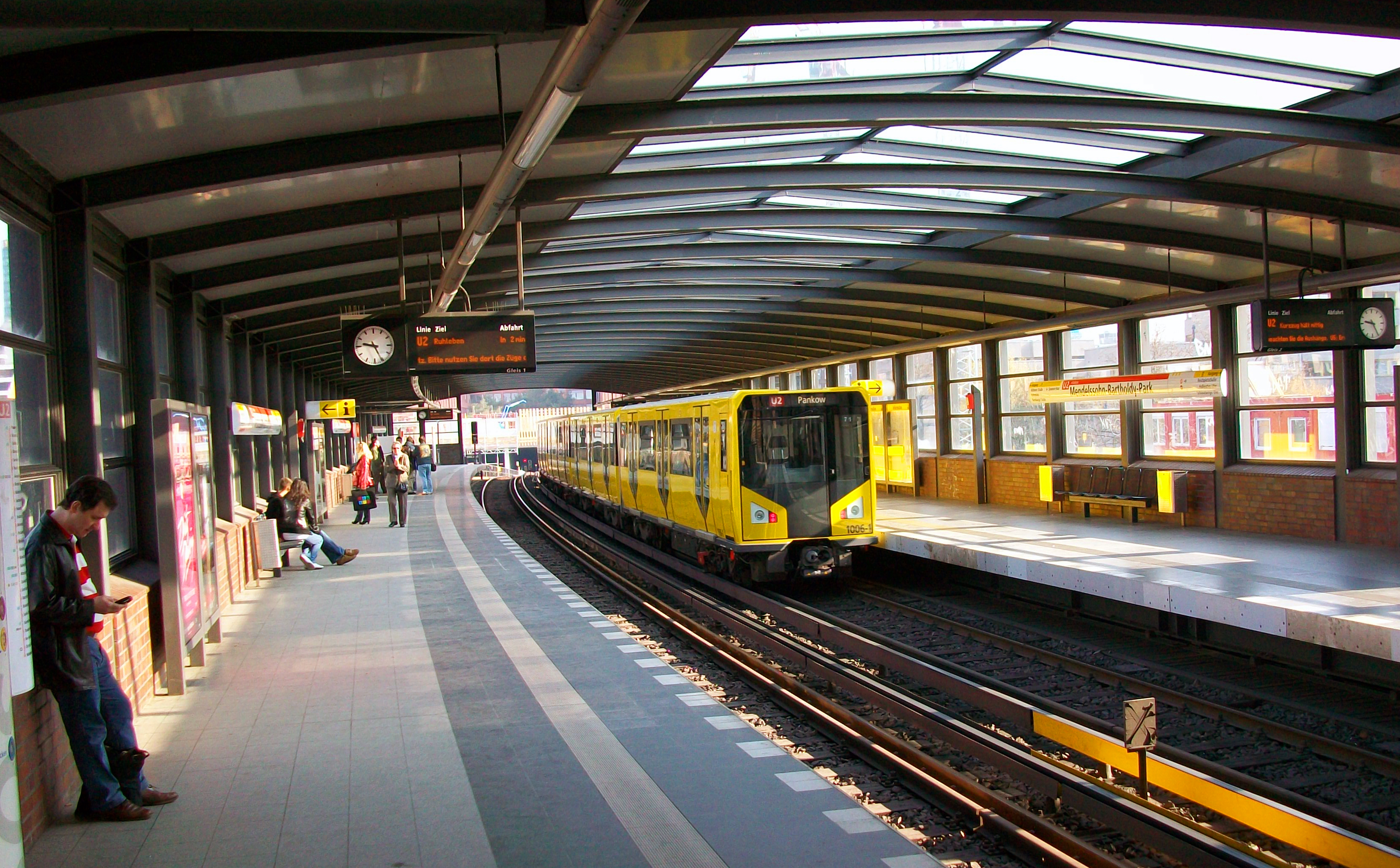
A train to Pankow departs from the station

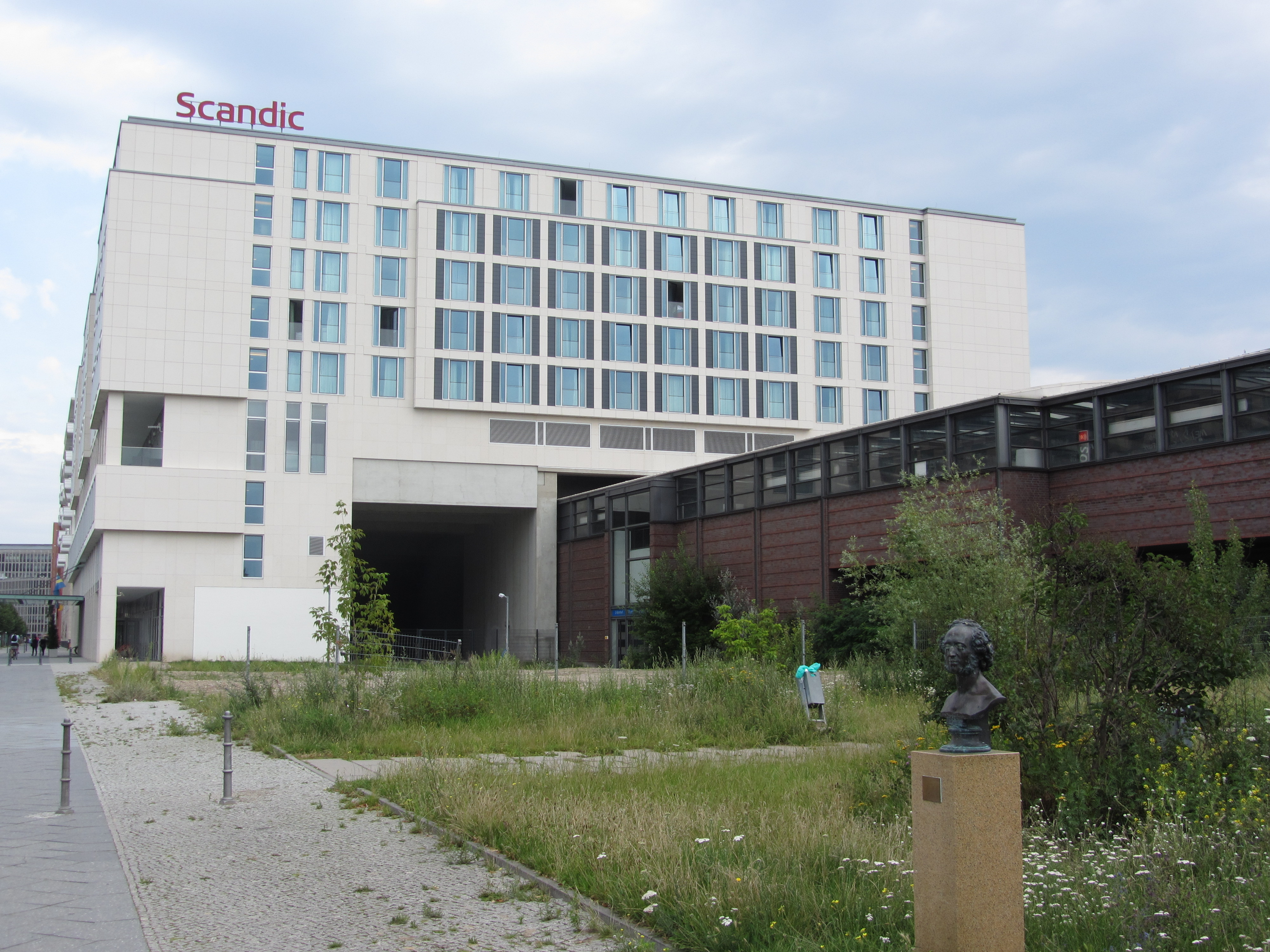
The station seen from the west side, or the corner of Reichpietschufer / Gabriele-Tergit-Promenade, with the opening for the possible extension of the S21 S-Bahn line. In the foreground the bust of the eponymous composer

Mendelssohn-Bartholdy-Park is a Berlin U-Bahn station on line U2, located in the Tiergarten district at the border with Kreuzberg. Opened in 1998, the station is named after a small park east of the building, itself named in honor of the composer Felix Mendelssohn Bartholdy, commonly known as Felix Mendelssohn.

Though it is one of the newest stations on the U-Bahn, it is located on the first Stammstrecke line of 1902, where its northern branch crosses the Landwehr Canal on a viaduct and passes north through part of the Scandic Hotel before heading underground towards Potsdamer Platz. With the building of the Berlin Wall on 13 August 1961, train service was interrupted, and for a brief time in 1991 the tracks served for the experimental M-Bahn maglev line, stopping at Bernburger Straße station slightly to the north.

Following reunification, the M-Bahn was removed to allow the U2 to be reinstated. The line was reopened on 13 November 1993, but the station was not opened until 2 October 1998.

The station has disabled access, with lifts at the southern entrance.
