= U10 (Berlin U-Bahn) =

Unrealised Berlin U-Bahn line

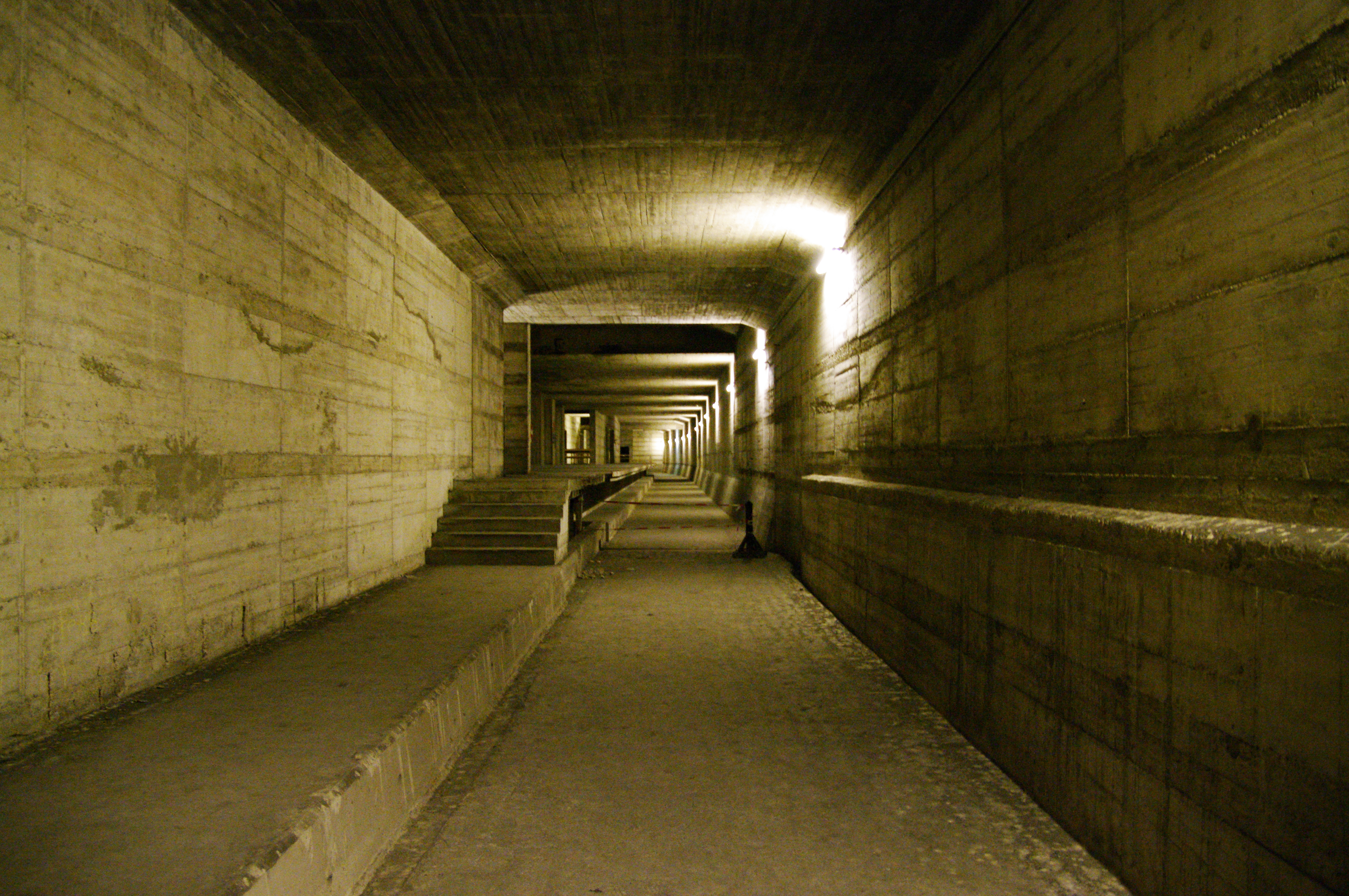
- Unfinished platform for the proposed U10, at Innsbrucker Platz

Overview
- Status: Unbuilt
- Locale: Berlin
- Termini: Weißensee; Drakestraße
- Stations: 29

Service
- Type: Rapid transit
- System: Berlin U-Bahn
- Operator(s): Berliner Verkehrsbetriebe
- Depot(s): Weißensee

Technical
- Track gauge: 1,435 mm (4 ft 8 1/2 in) standard gauge
- Loading gauge: Großprofil

The unbuilt U10 line, of the Berlin U-Bahn, was part of a planned "200-km-plan" extension of the Berlin U-Bahn from 1953–55, which was scrapped in 1977. It would have been a large-profile (Großprofil) metro line running from Falkenberg, in the northeastern part of the city, to Alexanderplatz, and down to Steglitz before terminating at Drakestraße in Lichterfelde. The designated letter name of the line was "F" until 1 July 1972, when it was changed to "Line 10". Because a number of tunnels and stations were constructed to accommodate the proposed line with elements visible at transfer stations and elsewhere, the line is popularly known as the "Phantomlinie" (Phantom line).

== Overview ==
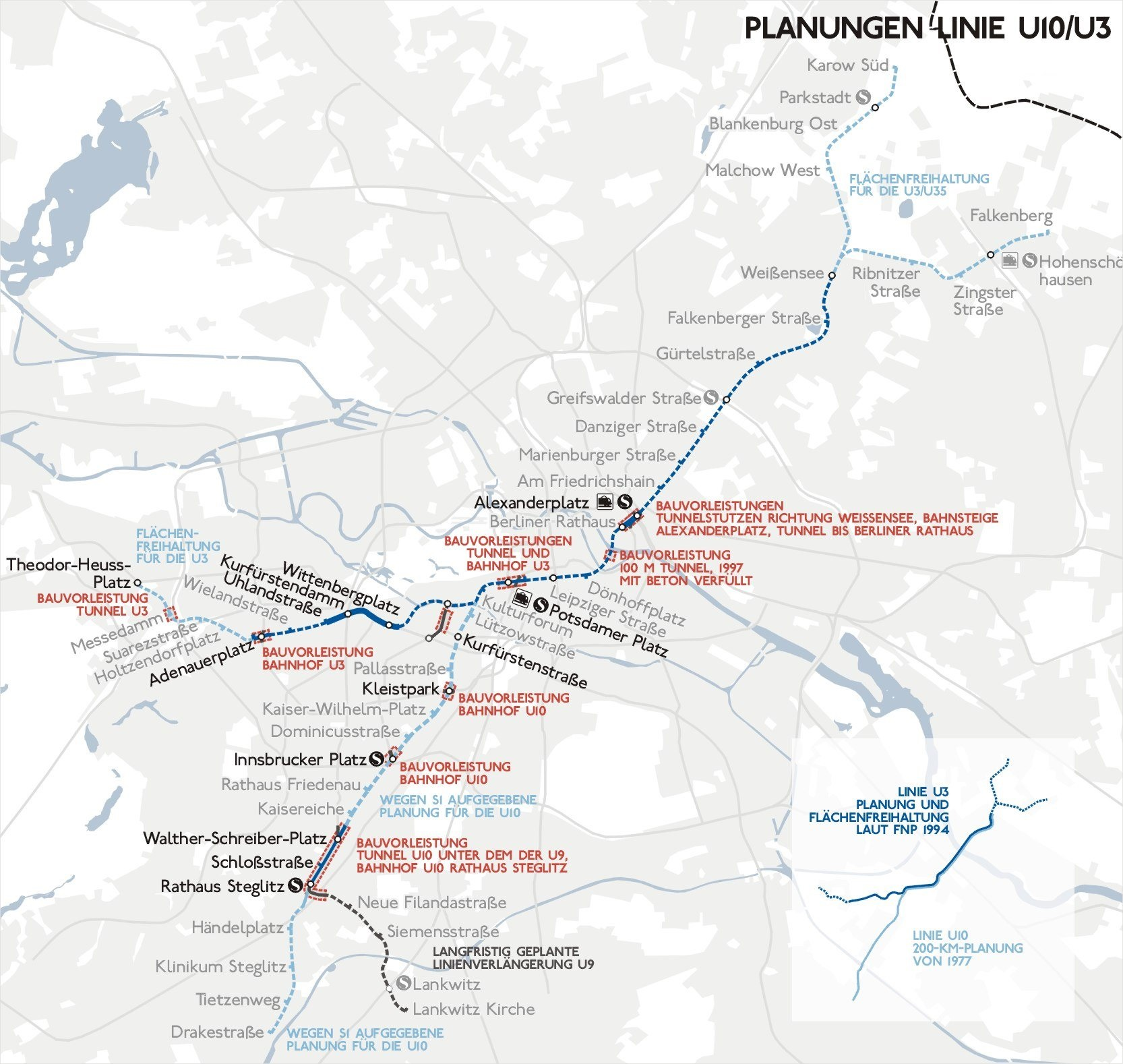
Combined map of the proposed U10 according to the 1953–1955 (scrapped in 1977) "200-km-plan", its revised 1993–94 legally-safeguarded alignment and the early-1990s U3/U35 plan. Basemap from 2005.

Prior to die Wende, the U10 line was in some other proposals intended to run from Drakestraße to the Kulturforum and then via the Brandenburg Gate/Reichstag to Lehrter Stadtbahnhof (now Berlin Hauptbahnhof), and from there continue along Lehrter Straße to the vicinity of the Schering AG headquarters in Wedding.

Around 1993–96, after reunification, the original 1950s plans for the U10 were discarded in favour of a provisional line U3/U35 (not to be confused with the current U3). The north-eastern branch of the U3 line between Weißensee and Potsdamer Platz follow the path of the proposed U10 line, but U3 then crosses the Madgeburger Platz to Wittenbergplatz and follows the path of the existing U1 line to Uhlandstraße, necessitating the need for conversion from Kleinprofil to Großprofil. Plans for the southwestern section of U10 were abandoned for this routing because it ran parallel to the S-Bahn line S1 and was perceived as being redundant, although the economic impact of said redundancy has never been studied.

Planning for U10 was officially removed from the Berlin transport master plan in 2003 (Measures 2015), and it is no longer considered part of said public transport network master plan through at least 2030. The aforementioned revised U10 alignment (shown in the attached map as a dark turquoise dashed line from Weißensee to Adenauerplatz) nevertheless remains legally safeguarded as part of Berlin's Land-use plan since 1994, which means that construction along the proposed route must accommodate the eventuality of such a line. For example, the Rotes Rathaus station on the U5 line extension (which opened in December 2020) includes a lower tunnel and shell station (Rohbau) for the proposed U10.

In 2023, Manja Schreiner, a CDU politician serving as Berlin's Transport Minister, proposed a new U10 alignment running from Alexanderplatz to Buch via Weissensee, partly also to relieve the overcrowded M4 tram line.

== Stations ==
Station	Short Form	Notes	Interchange
Falkenberg			
Hohenschönhausen			
Zingster Straße			
Ribnitzer Straße			
Weißensee			
Falkenberger Straße			
Gürtelstraße			
Greifswalder Straße			(Ringbahn)
Danziger Straße			
Marienburger Straße			
Am Friedrichshain			
Alexanderplatz	Al		(Stadtbahn)
Rotes Rathaus (unten)	RHU		U5
Dönhoffplatz			
Leipziger Straße			(Stadtmitte)
Potsdamer Platz	PP	Rohbau	(Nord-Süd-Tunnel)
Kulturforum			
Lützowstraße			
Kurfürstenstraße (unten)			U1
Pallasstraße			
Kleistpark	Ktu	Rohbau	U7
Kaiser-Wilhelm-Platz			
Dominicusstraße			
Innsbrucker Platz	Ipu	Rohbau	(Ringbahn)
Rathaus Friedenau			
Kaisereiche			
Walther-Schreiber-Platz (Line F)	Wsf		U9
Schloßstraße	Slo/Slu		U9
Rathaus Steglitz	Rzu		(Wannseebahn)
Händelplatz			
Klinikum Steglitz			
Tietzenweg			
Drakestraße			

== Existing portions ==
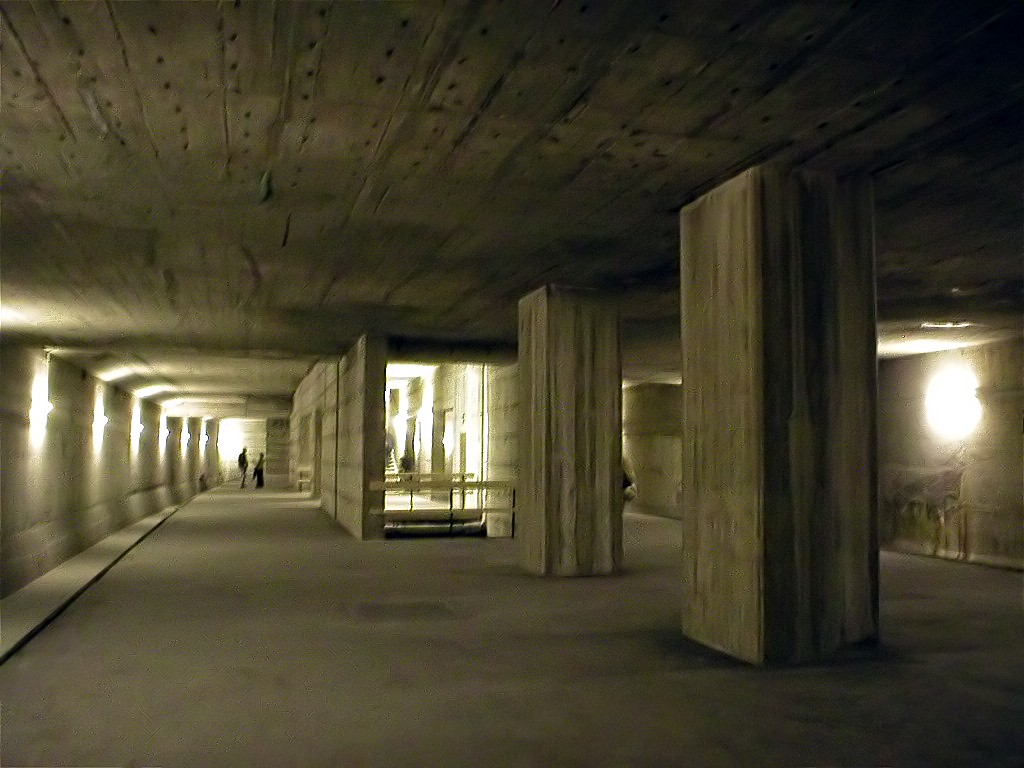
Incomplete U-Bahn station at Innsbrucker Platz

- At Alexanderplatz station on the U5, two outer platforms were constructed to allow same-platform transfers. Today, these tracks are used for parking trains and for special service such as the Tunnel Tour. When the station was redesigned in the 1960s, the two-tunnel chamber toward Weissensee added a shielded chambers in accommodate two single-track tunnel boring machines.
- The station at Berlin-Rathaus on the U5 extension, opened in 2020 includes a lower level designed to accommodate a transfer to line U10.
- During the renovation of Mühlendamm Bridge in 1936, a 95-metre tunnel section was constructed below the Spree river bed. After the reunification of Berlin, the plans for using this tunnel were abandoned because of the development of Fischerinsel, and the tunnel was filled up in 1997.
- The 2006 renovation of the station at Potsdamer Platz includes a platform for line U10, and the station includes overpasses and underpasses to provide connections. The station includes a 392 m-long (1,286 ft) tunnel for the U3/U10 line which is occasionally used for events.
- The 1967–69 construction of the U7 station at Kleistpark includes a 90-m long section for a lower U10 platform and staircase connections to this platform.
- During the construction of the semi-ring of the Bundesautobahn 100 in 1971–79, a platform for a U10 stop was erected under the freeway to allow connection to the U4 and S-bahn at Innsbrucker Platz.
- During construction of the extension of the U9 line from Walther-Schreiber-Platz to Steglitz in 1968–74, a building to house switching equipment was constructed, and the space beneath Schoßstrasse included a two-storey tunnel. The U9 line was never completed as envisioned, so the U9 line uses 1536 metres of tunnel built for the unfinished U10 as a reversing facility and to also store trains overnight.
