= Park am Gleisdreieck =

Urban public park in Berlin, Germany

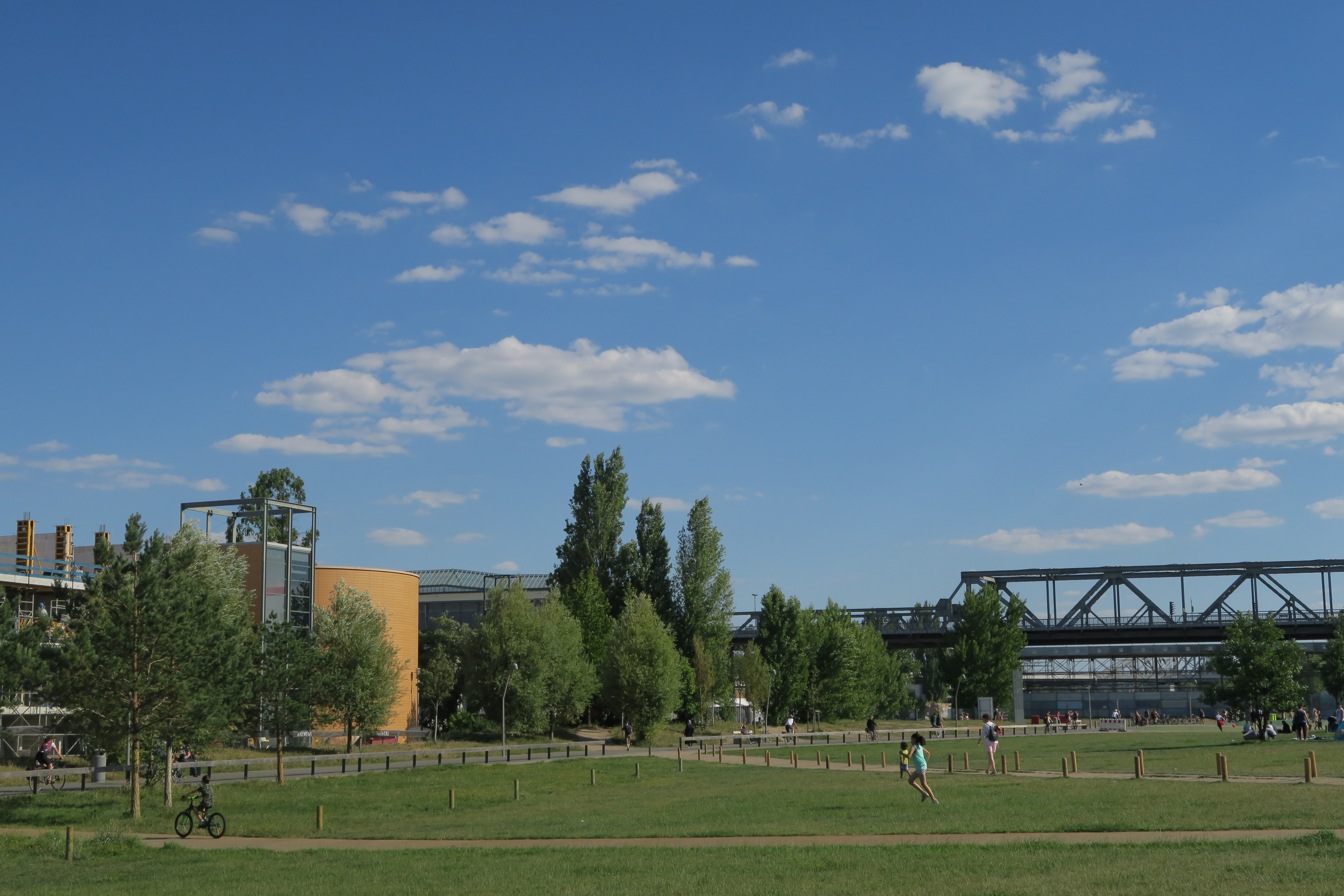
- Lawns and railway viaducts in the park

- Location within Berlin
- Type: Urban public park
- Location: Kreuzberg and Schöneberg, Berlin, Germany
- Coordinates: 52°29′44.9″N 13°22′32.8″E
- Area: ~31.5 ha
- Created: 2011–2014 (sections opened in stages)

The Park am Gleisdreieck is an inner city public park on former railway land between Kreuzberg and Schöneberg in Berlin, Germany. Developed in stages between 2011 and 2014, it comprises the Ostpark (East Park), the Westpark, and the southern Dora-Duncker Park (formerly "Flaschenhalspark"). The design by Atelier LOIDL integrates lawns and recreational facilities with preserved railway relics and ruderal habitats. The combined area is about 31.5 hectares.

== Location and layout ==
The park stretches from the Landwehr Canal near Potsdamer Platz south to the Yorckbrücken / Monumentenbrücke corridor. A north–south mainline railway divides the site into Ostpark (east) and Westpark (west); Dora-Duncker Park continues the park towards Schöneberger Südgelände Nature Park. Ostpark and Dora-Duncker Park carry long axial paths used by cyclists and walkers, while Westpark opens to adjoining residential streets and includes lawns and multiuse courts.

== History ==
=== Railway lands and early proposals ===
The park occupies parts of the former Anhalter and Potsdamer freight yards and the historic "railway triangle" (Gleisdreieck). After freight operations declined in the post-war decades, the area became an overgrown wasteland with disused tracks and infrastructure. In the late 1990s the State of Berlin and rail property owners agreed to develop a public park as compensation for nearby redevelopment around Potsdamer and Leipziger Platz.

=== Competition and construction ===
A two-stage landscape competition (2005–2006) selected the final concept. Works for Ostpark (approx. 17 ha) began in 2008–2009, with opening in September 2011; Westpark (approx. 9–10 ha) was inaugurated on 31 May 2013; and the southern strip, renamed Dora-Duncker Park (approx. 5.5 ha; formerly Flaschenhalspark), opened on 21 March 2014.

== Design and landscape ==
The design retains rails, signal posts and sleepers as historic markers within a contemporary framework of meadows, terraces and long benches. Ruderal zones were integrated to support urban biodiversity.

== Sports and amenities ==
- Beach volleyball (Beach61): A large sand-sports complex with numerous courts and supporting facilities operates at Westpark; the "Beach61" brand traces its origins to 2005 and moved to the present site around 2010.
- Skate elements and plazas: Ostpark includes paved skate features and a pool-style bowl near the former postal signal box; design documentation and reviews note integrated sport tracks and skateable areas.
- Playgrounds and courts: Facilities include children’s play areas, boules lanes and multiuse courts, distributed among meadows and path networks.
- Paths and cycling: Long paths connect to city cycling routes. Citizens' preferences were taken into account for planning

== Gallery ==
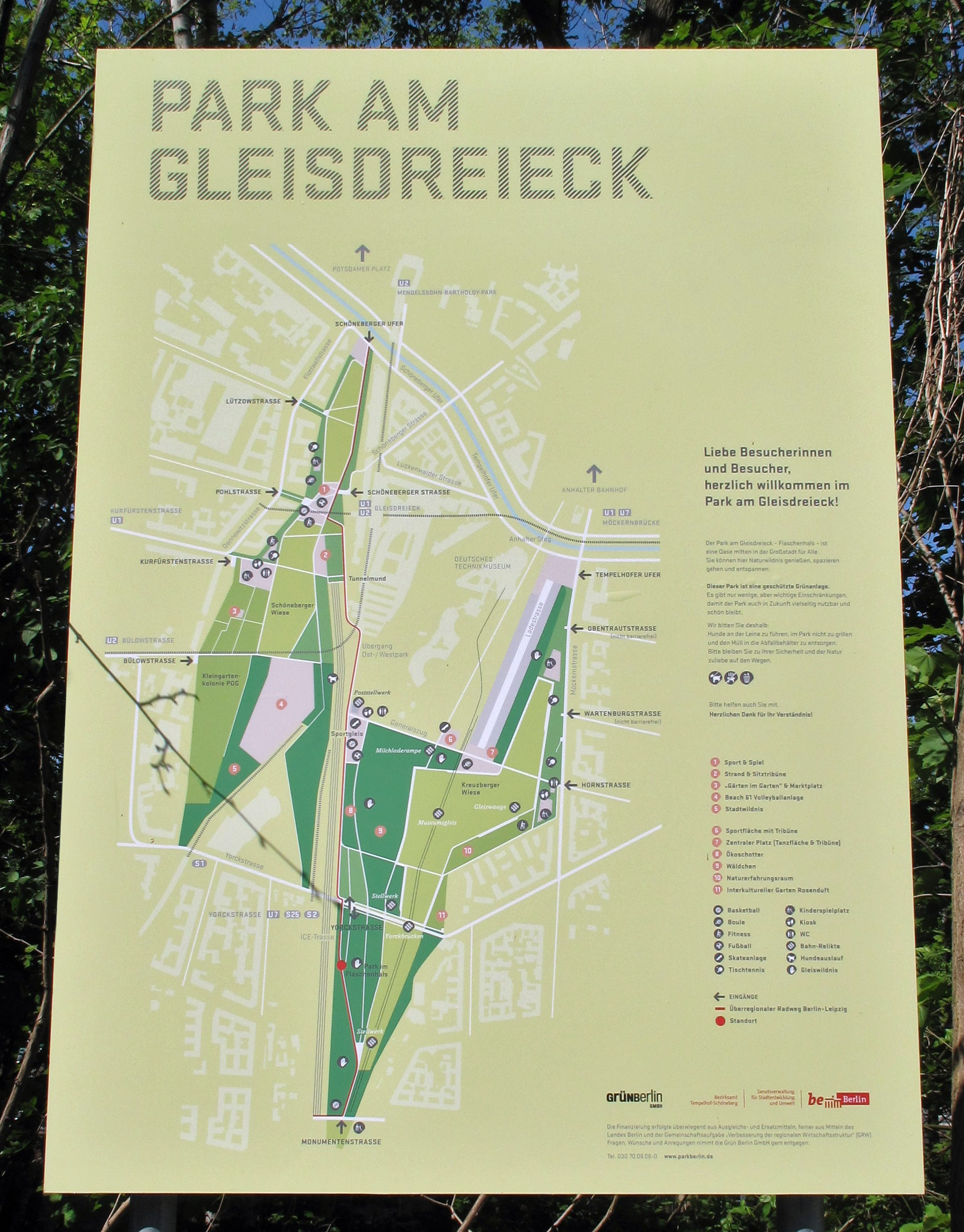
Map of the three park parts.

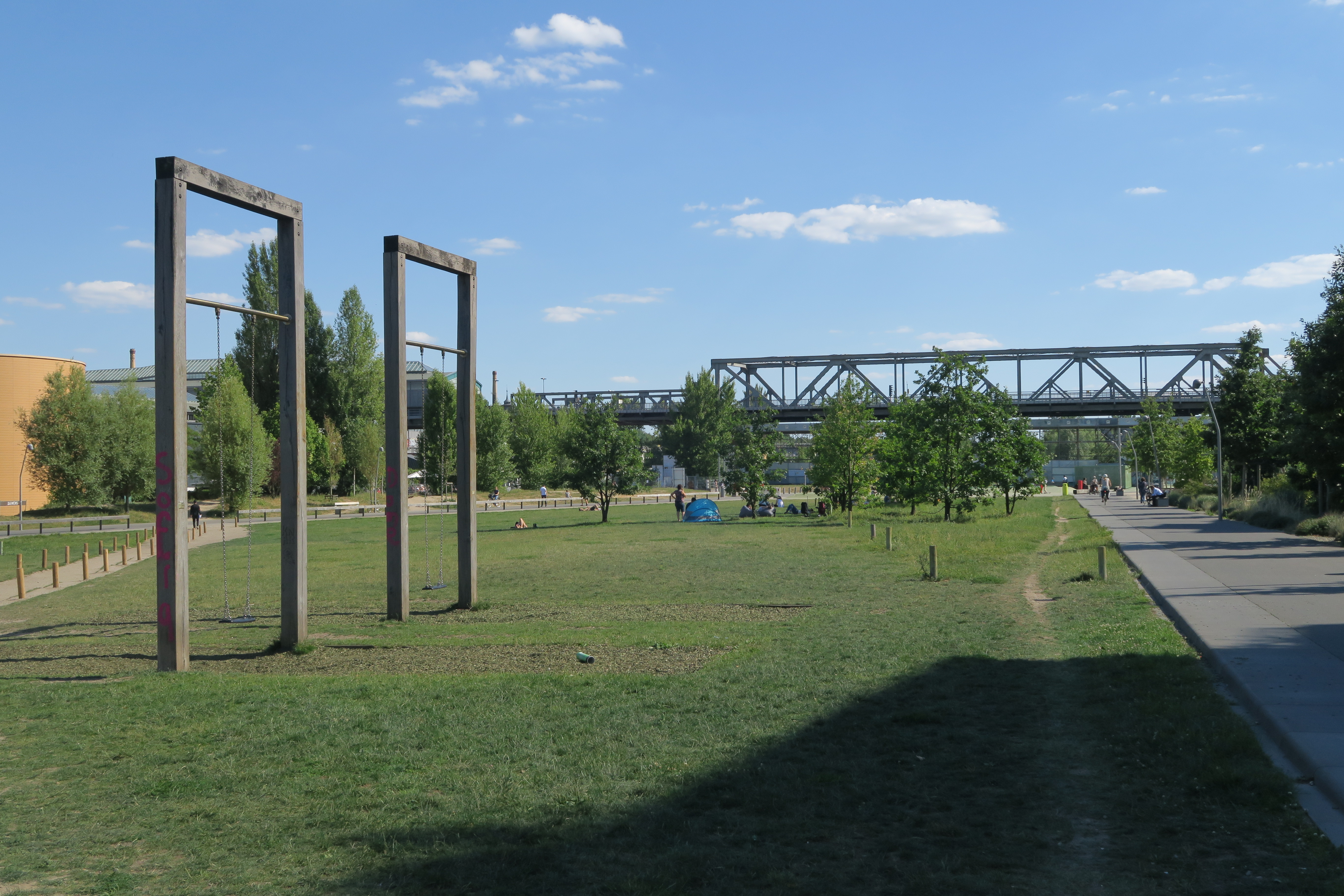
Pathways and open meadow.

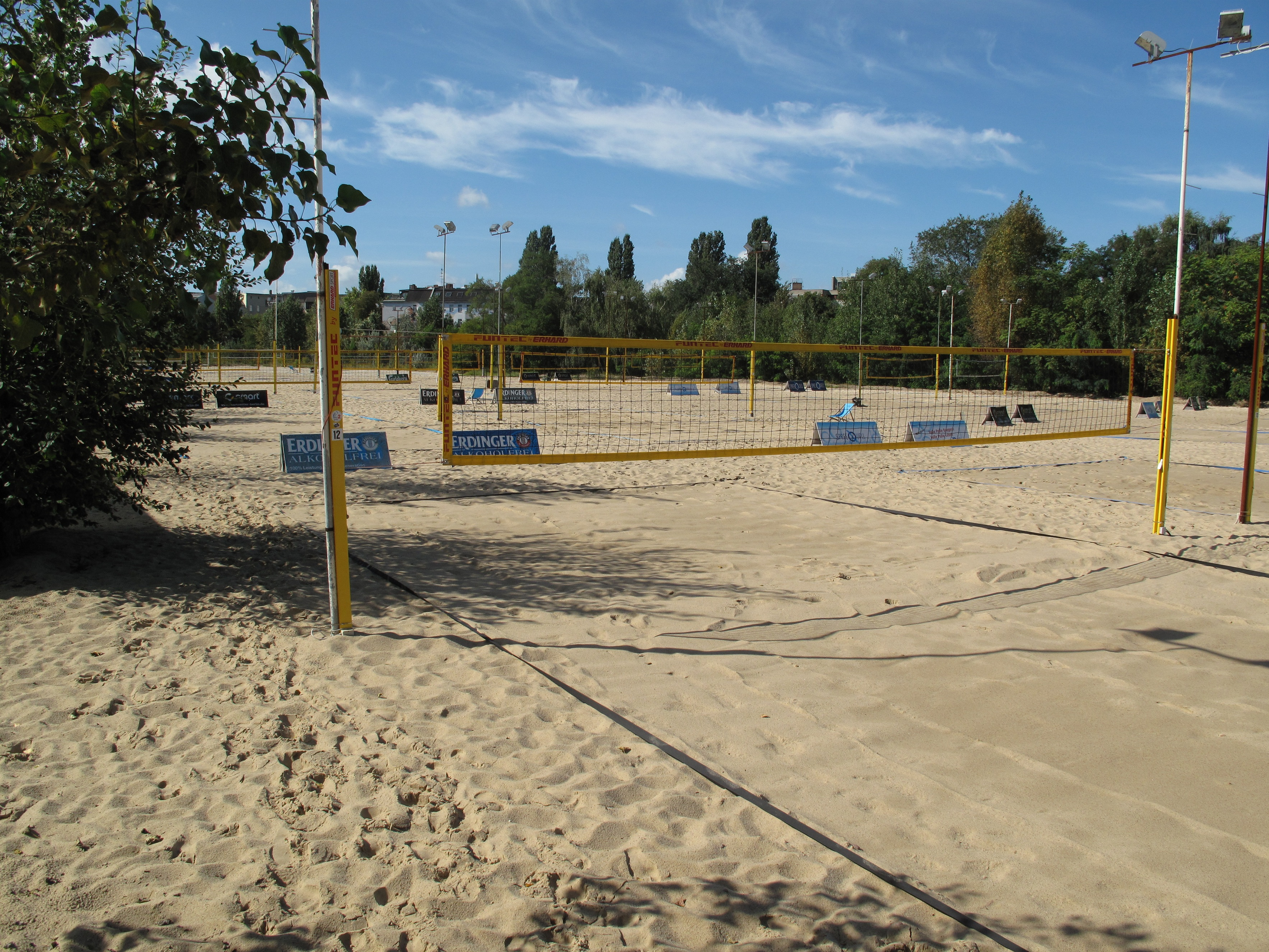
Beach-volleyball complex.

== See also ==
- Urban park
- Potsdamer Platz
