= Bülowstraße station =

Berlin U-Bahn station

Bülowstraße
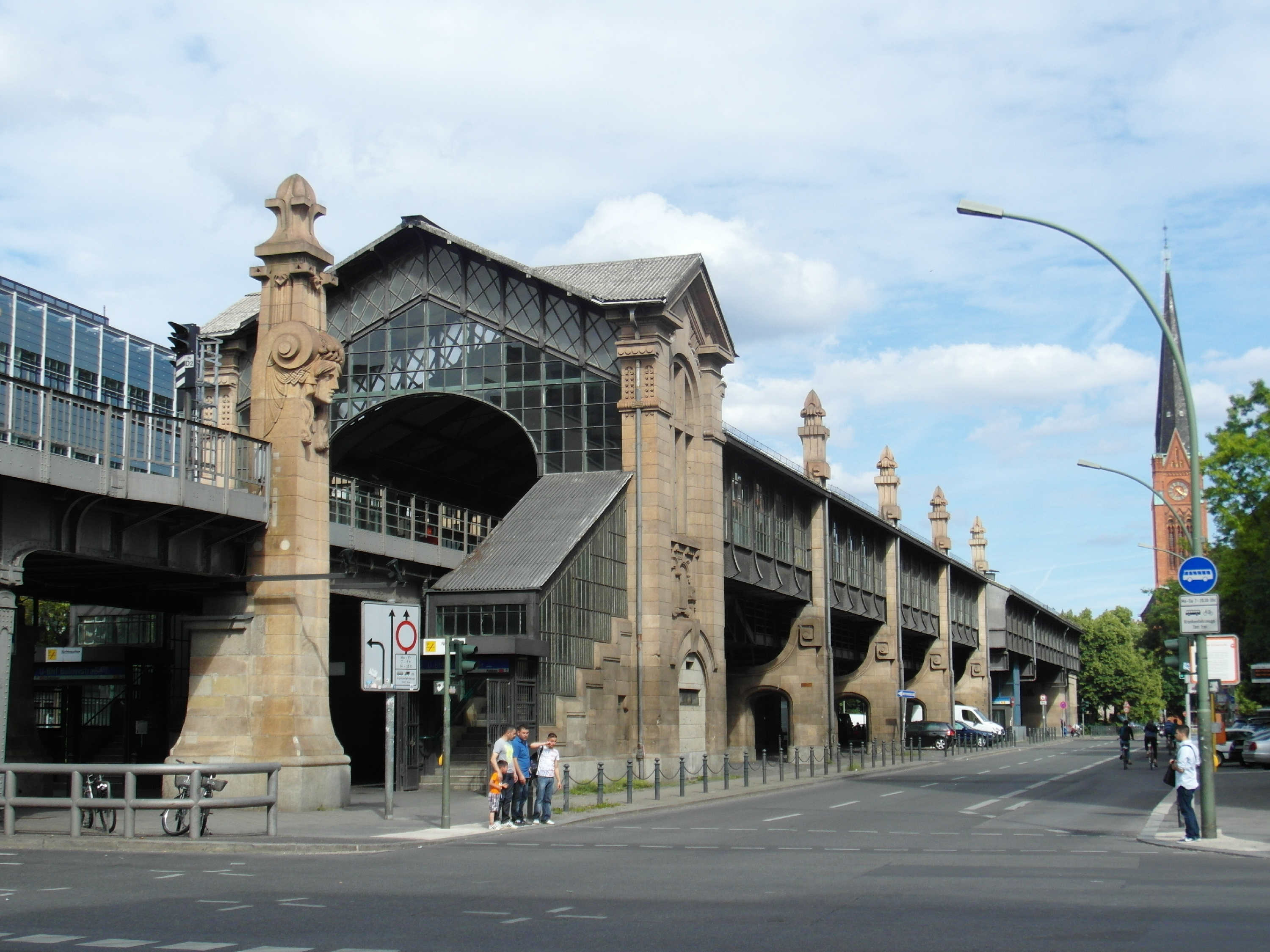
- Station building seen from the outside from street level

General information
- Location: Bülowstraße/Potsdamer Straße; Schöneberg, Berlin; Germany
- Coordinates: 52°29′52″N 13°21′44″E
- Owner: Berliner Verkehrsbetriebe
- Operator: Berliner Verkehrsbetriebe
- Platforms: 2 side platforms
- Tracks: 2
- Connections: : 106, 187, N1, N2; : M19, M48, M85

Construction
- Structure type: Elevated
- Cycle facilities: Yes
- Accessible: Yes

Other information
- Fare zone: : Berlin A/5555

History
- Opened: 11 March 1902; 124 years ago

Services
Preceding station	Berlin U-Bahn	Following station
Nollendorfplatz towards Ruhleben	U2	Gleisdreieck towards Pankow
Route map
Location
- Location within Berlin Location within Germany Location within Europe

Bülowstraße is a Berlin U-Bahn station on line U2, located in the Schöneberg district. It opened in 1902 on the western branch of the Stammstrecke, Berlin's first U-Bahn line. Like the eponymous street, the station is named after the Prussian general Friedrich Wilhelm Freiherr von Bülow.

The station features in the 2011 film Unknown, starring Liam Neeson.

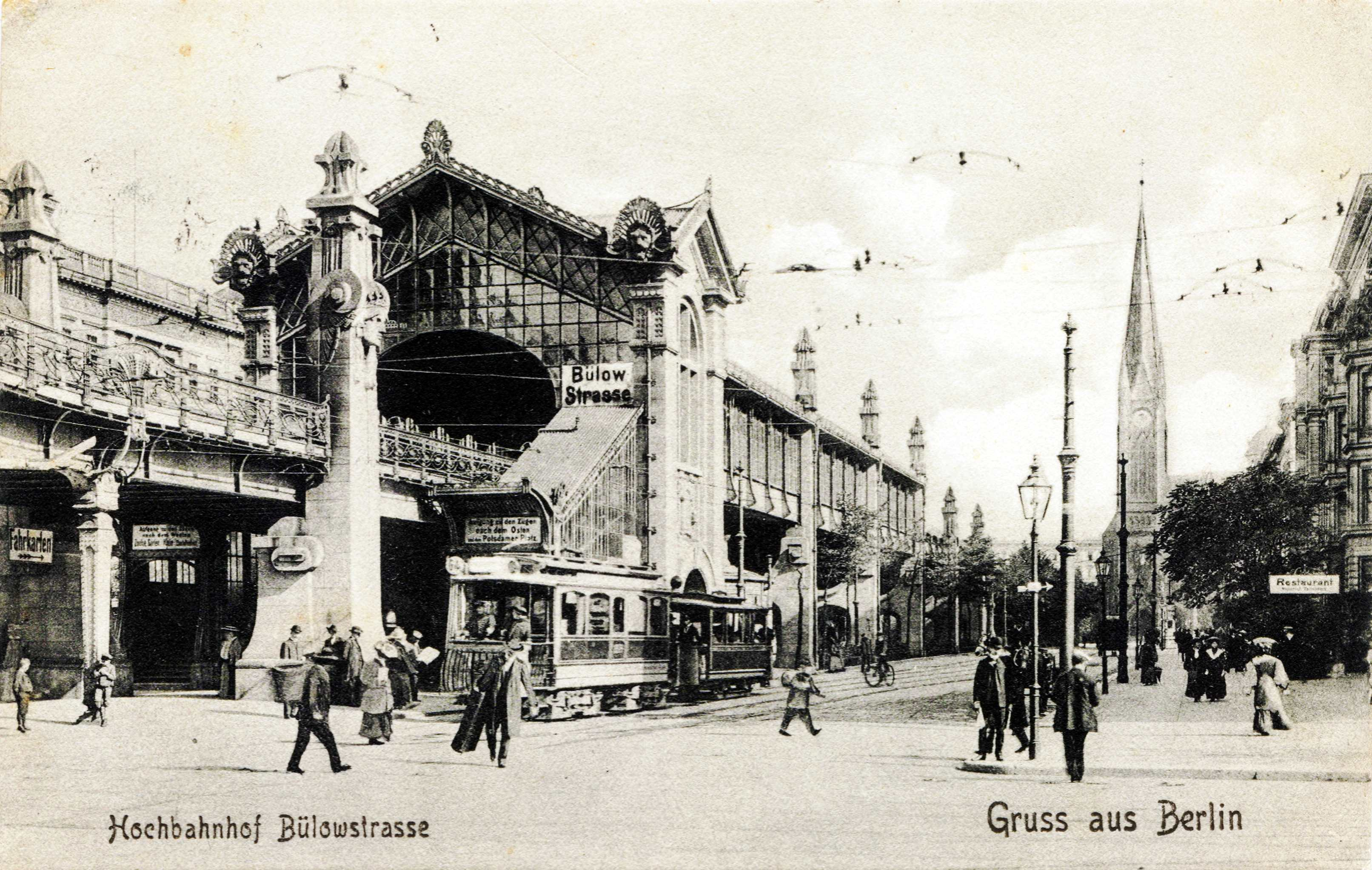
Bülowstraße station around 1902

== History ==
Architect Bruno Möhring planned it in an Art Nouveau style, and his son Rudolf enlarged the hall in 1929.

Heavily damaged by air raids and the Battle of Berlin on 22/23 November 1943 and 19 July 1944, the station was rebuilt after World War II, but went out of service in 1972 due to the interruption of the U2 line by the construction of the Berlin Wall. The building then hosted a bazaar in discarded U-Bahn cars, until in 1993 the eastern and western parts of the U2 were reconnected.
