= Hellersdorf =

- Quarter of Berlin
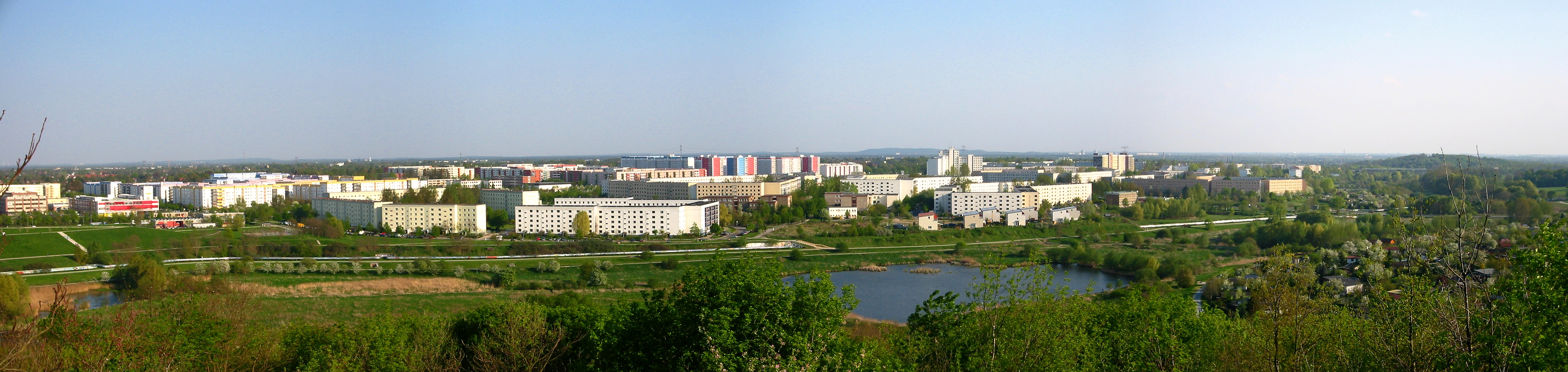
- Hellersdorf from Kienberg

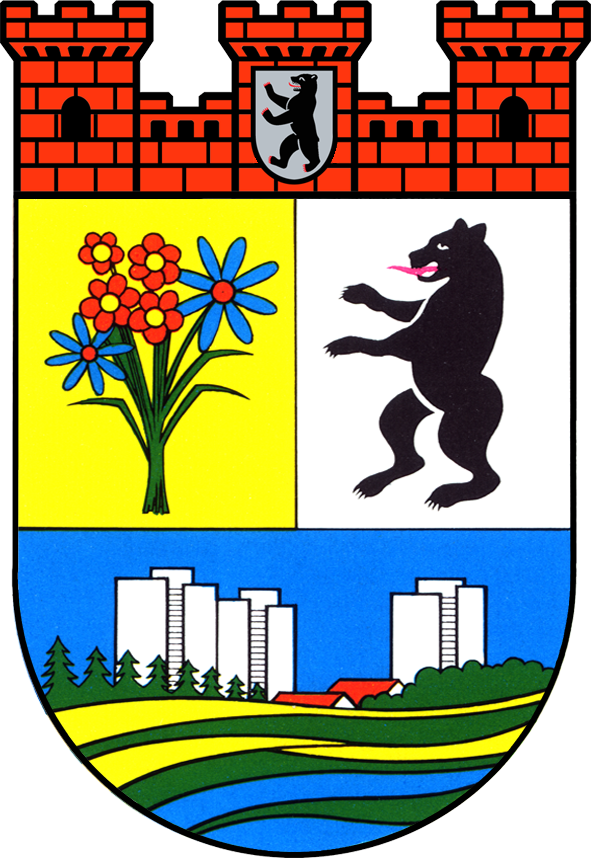
- Coat of arms

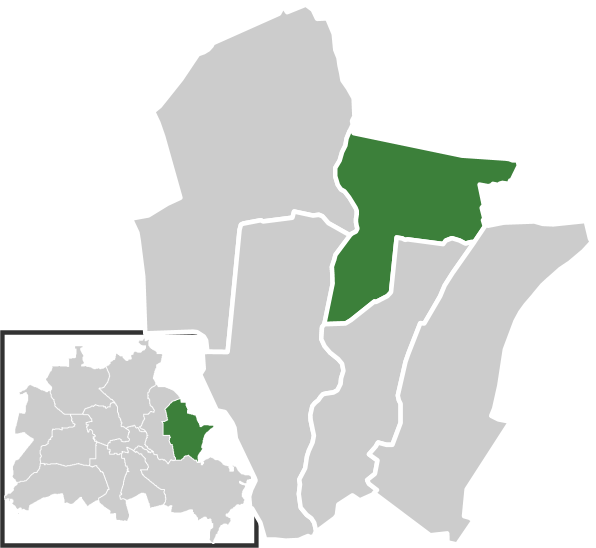
- Location of Hellersdorf in Marzahn-Hellersdorf and Berlin
- Interactive map of Hellersdorf
- Location within Germany Location within Berlin
- Coordinates: 52°32′21″N 13°35′32″E
- Country: Germany
- State: Berlin
- City: Berlin
- Borough: Marzahn-Hellersdorf
- Founded: 1375
- Subdivisions: 3 zones

Area
  - Total: 8.1 km^{2} (3.1 sq mi)
- Elevation: 52 m (171 ft)

Population (2024-12-31)
  - Total: 93,512
  - Density: 12,000/km^{2} (30,000/sq mi)
- Time zone: UTC+01:00 (CET)
  - Summer (DST): UTC+02:00 (CEST)
- Postal codes: 12619, 12627, 12629, 12683
- Vehicle registration: B

Hellersdorf (German pronunciation: [ˈhɛlɐsˌdɔʁf]) is a locality in the borough of Marzahn-Hellersdorf in Berlin. Between 1986 and Berlin's 2001 administrative reform, it was a borough in its own right, consisting of the current area of Hellersdorf as well as Kaulsdorf and Mahlsdorf.

== History ==
Before German reunification in 1989 it was part of East Berlin. Situated at the eastern part of Berlin, the area is mainly a large housing estate from the 1980s, made up of Plattenbau (concrete slab) buildings.

The historic village of Helwichstorpp was first mentioned in a 1375 land registry of Emperor Charles IV, then also Margrave of Brandenburg. The city of Berlin acquired the former Hellersdorf manor in 1886; it was finally incorporated by the 1920 Greater Berlin Act as a part of the Lichtenberg borough. During German reunification on 3 October 1990, a small part of Hönow (primarily around the last two stations of U5) was annexed by this borough.

== Geography ==
=== Subdivision ===
Hellersdorf is divided into 3 zones (Ortslagen):

- Hellersdorf-Nord
- Hellersdorf-Ost
- Hellersdorf-Süd

== Transport ==
Hellersdorf is served by the U5 line of the Berlin U-Bahn at the stations Kaulsdorf-Nord, Neue Grottkauer Straße, Cottbusser Platz, Hellersdorf, Louis-Lewin-Straße and Hönow.
