= Berlin Wuhletal station =

Railway station in Berlin, Germany

Coordinates: 52°30′45″N 13°34′30″E

Wuhletal
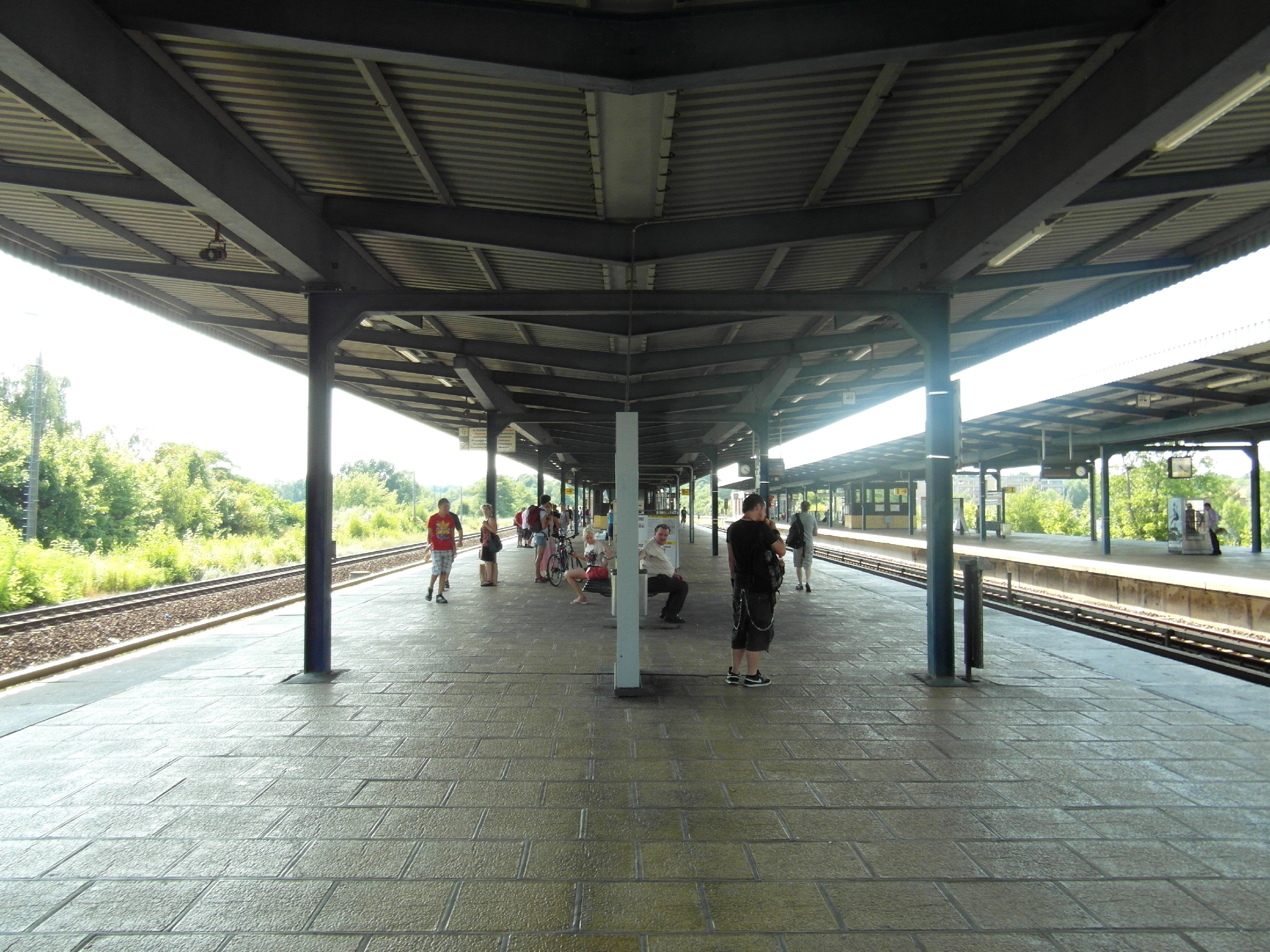
- The S-Bahn and U-Bahn platforms in 2013.

General information
- Location: Altentreptower Straße; Berlin, Marzahn-Hellersdorf; Germany
- Line: Prussian Eastern Railway
- Platforms: 2 island platforms
- Tracks: 4
- Connections: 191 291 N5 N69 N90 N91 N95

Construction
- Structure type: Above ground

Other information
- Station code: ?
- DS100 code: ?
- IBNR: 8089049
- Category: ?
- Fare zone: VBB: Berlin B/5656

Services
Preceding station	Berlin S-Bahn	Following station
Biesdorf towards Westkreuz	S5	Kaulsdorf towards Strausberg Nord
Preceding station	Berlin U-Bahn	Following station
Elsterwerdaer Platz towards Berlin Hbf	U5	Kaulsdorf-Nord towards Hönow
Location

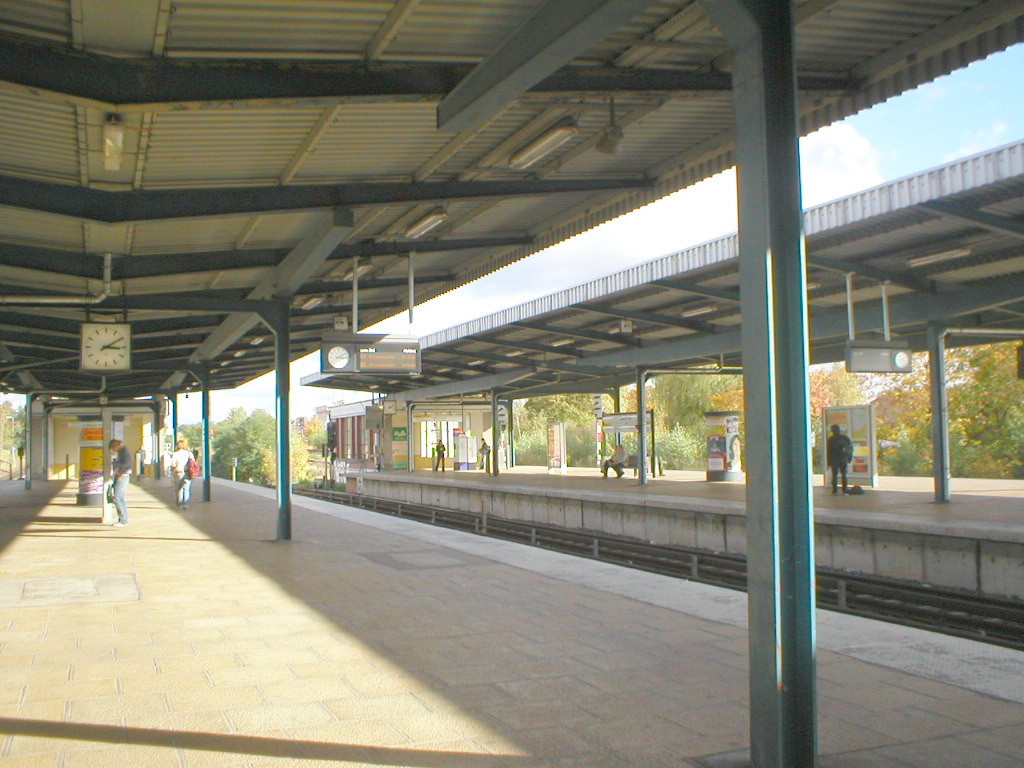
The U-Bahn platforms at Wuhletal

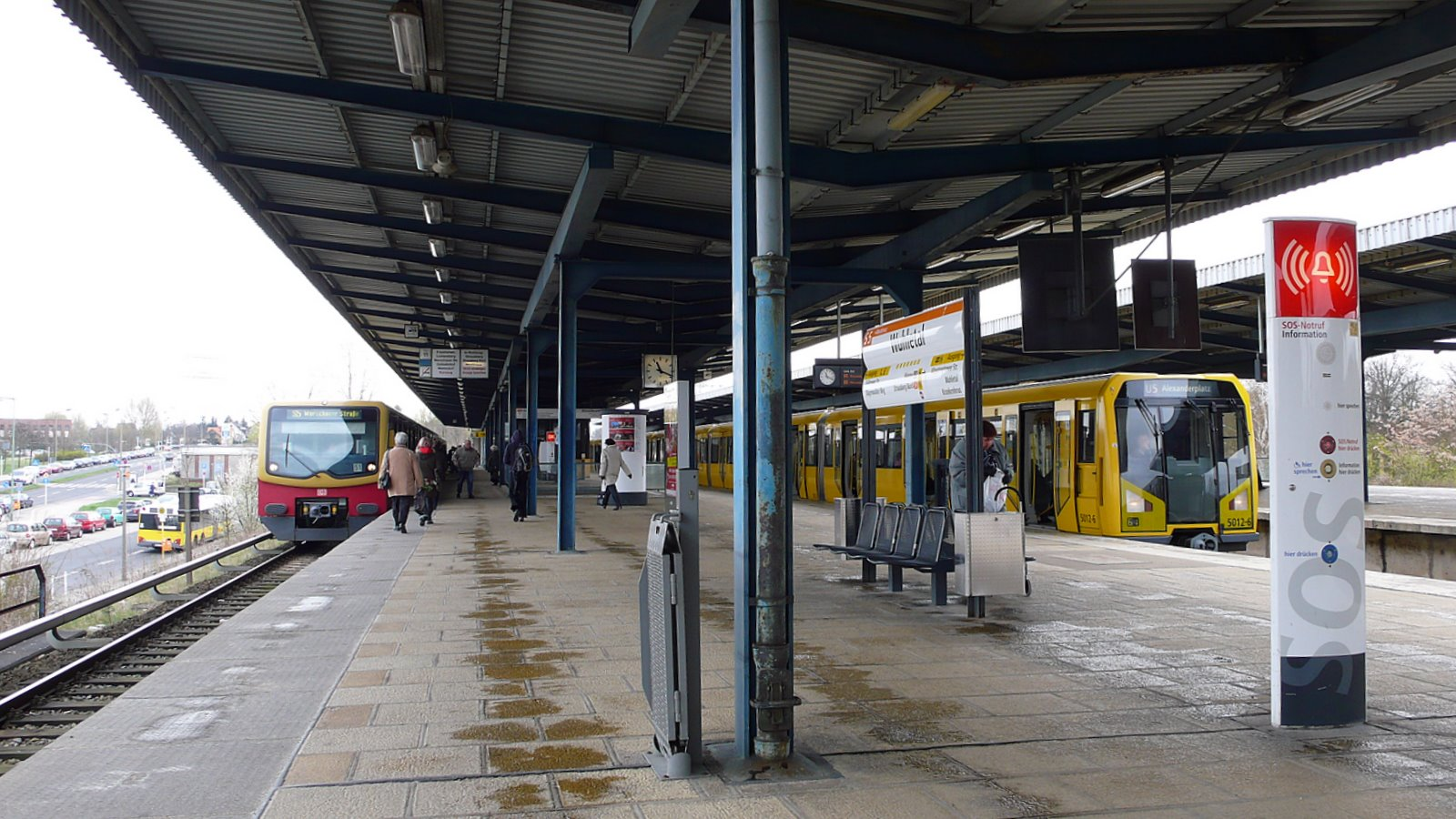
Platform with S- and U-Bahn trains

Wuhletal is a railway station in the Kaulsdorf district of the Marzahn-Hellersdorf borough of Berlin. It is served by the S-Bahn line S5 and the U-Bahn line U5.

The station consists of two island platforms paired by direction, with the S-Bahn serving the outer faces of each platform and the U-Bahn the inner faces of the same platforms. This makes interchange between the two modes very easy and is a unique situation in Berlin. At 160 metres (520 ft) in length, the platforms are the longest in the Berlin U-Bahn network.

== Etymology ==
The Wuhletal ("Wuhle Valley") is a green corridor in the northeastern Berlin district of Marzahn-Hellersdorf on the river Wuhle, from which it also has its name. The park was established after the decommissioning of the Falkenberg sewage treatment plant from 2002, which had previously used the Wuhle as receiving water. The closure of the sewage treatment plant was considered critical by environmentalists because of the expected fall in the groundwater level in the landscape park area.

The Wuhletalwächter is a six-sided, 15.5 meter high concrete climbing tower with about 500 m^{2} climbing area and a boulder wall around the climbing tower (about 400 m^{2}), located at the northern end of the Wuhletal. The AlpinClub Berlin, a section of the German Alpine Club, exercises its house right here.

At the merger of Marzahn and Hellersdorf, "Wuhletal" was at times discussed as the district name. This name is used by the district associations of parties and sub-organizations that supported this proposal (CDU and FDP) for the district.

== History ==
The plan for the station began in the 1980s where the station was built as Kaulsdorf-West, under the eastern extension of the former line E to develop the large housing estate Hellersdorf and together with the other stations of the route to Hönow on 1 July 1989 opened. The station is located on the embankment of the existing S-Bahn on the route of the Prussian Eastern Railway, which crosses here used for the subway VnK Railway. The railway embankment is underpassed by the Wuhle and two pedestrian tunnels.
