= Kaulsdorf =

The following places in Germany are called Kaulsdorf:

- Kaulsdorf (Berlin), a quarter in the borough Marzahn-Hellersdorf of Berlin
  - Kaulsdorf station, a railway station
- Kaulsdorf (Saale), a municipality in the district Saalfeld-Rudolstadt, in Thuringia
