= Strausberger Platz station =

Station of the Berlin U-Bahn

Coordinates: 52°31′05″N 13°25′51″E

Strausberger Platz
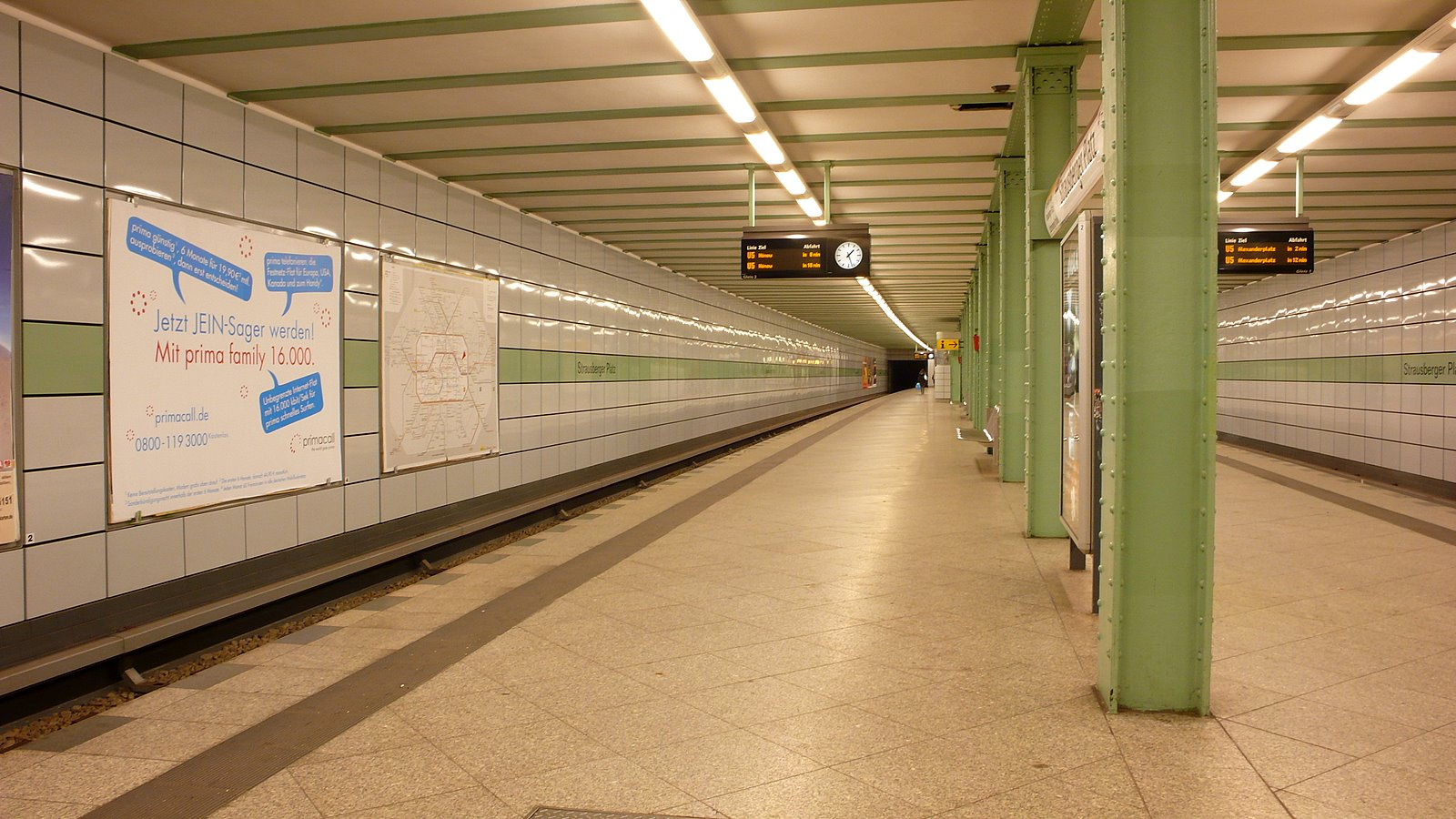

General information
- Location: Strausberger Platz/Karl-Marx-Allee; Friedrichshain-Kreuzberg
- Owner: Berliner Verkehrsbetriebe
- Operator: Berliner Verkehrsbetriebe
- Platforms: 1 island platform
- Tracks: 2
- Train operators: Berliner Verkehrsbetriebe
- Connections: 142 N5

Construction
- Structure type: Underground

Other information
- Fare zone: VBB: Berlin A/5555

History
- Opened: 21 December 1930; 95 years ago

Services
Preceding station	Berlin U-Bahn	Following station
Schillingstraße towards Berlin Hbf	U5	Weberwiese towards Hönow
Location

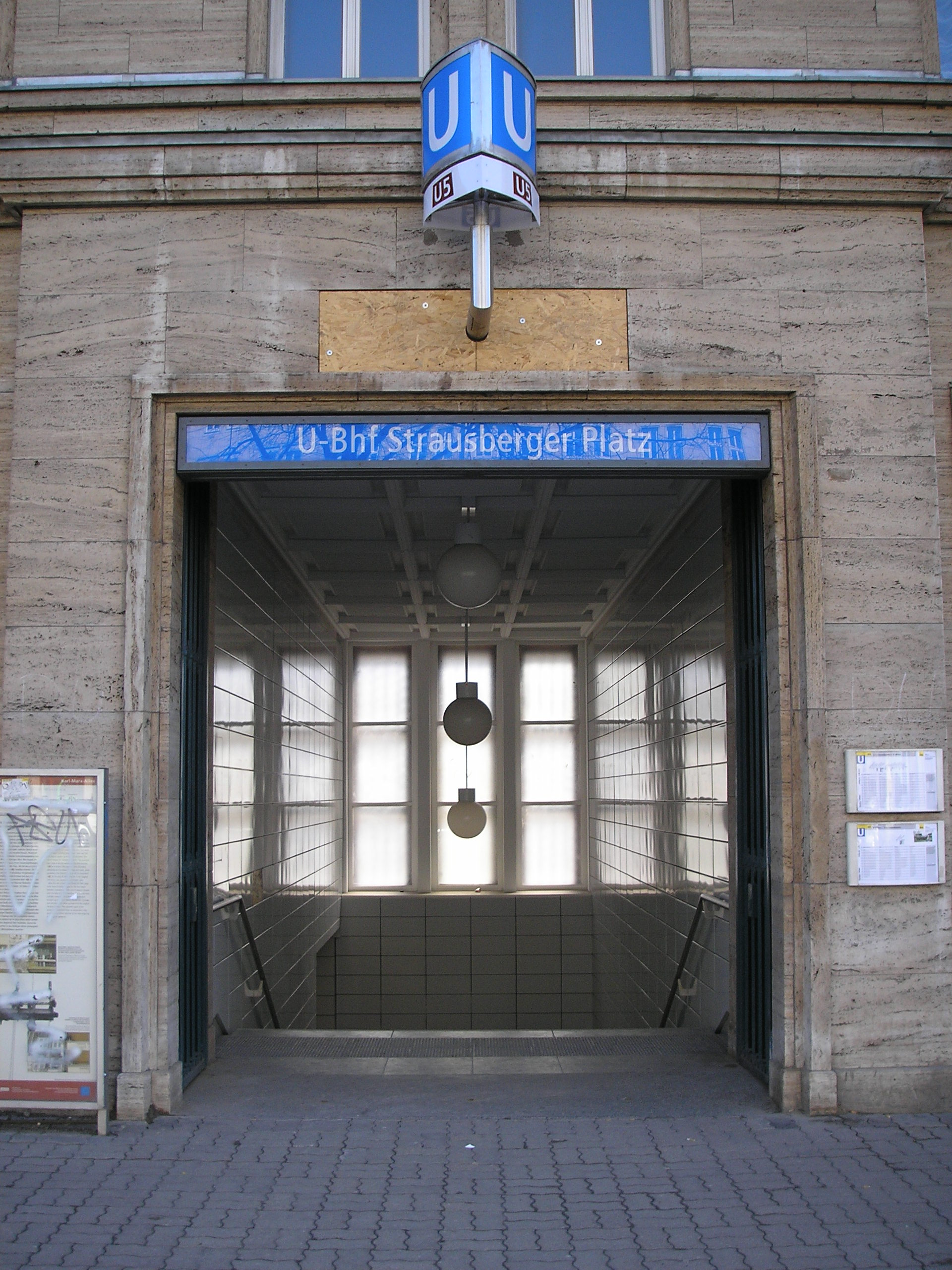
One of several entrances to Strausberger Platz U-Bahn station recessed into buildings on Karl-Marx-Allee

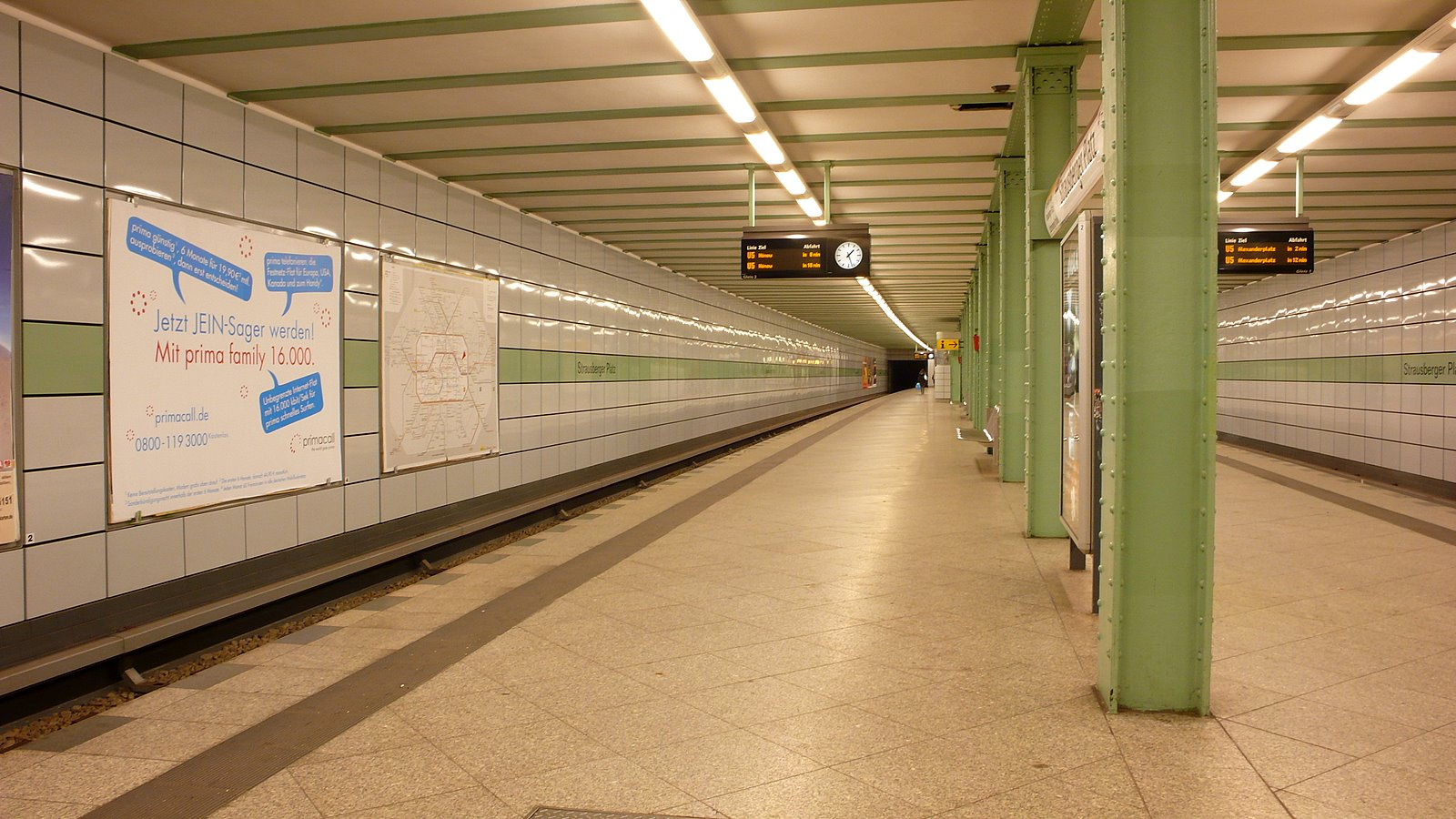
Platform in 2007

Strausberger Platz is a Berlin U-Bahn station located on the U5 line.

== History ==
The station was designed by Alfred Grenander and opened in 1930. On 7 May 1944, the western concourse was directly hit. It was closed in 1945 after the station was destroyed during the Battle of Berlin. In 1952, the station was rebuilt.

The entrances were moved and a new one was built. In 2003, the station was renovated and green panels were attached to the walls.
