= VnK Railway =

Railway line in Germany

Connection to Kaulsdorf
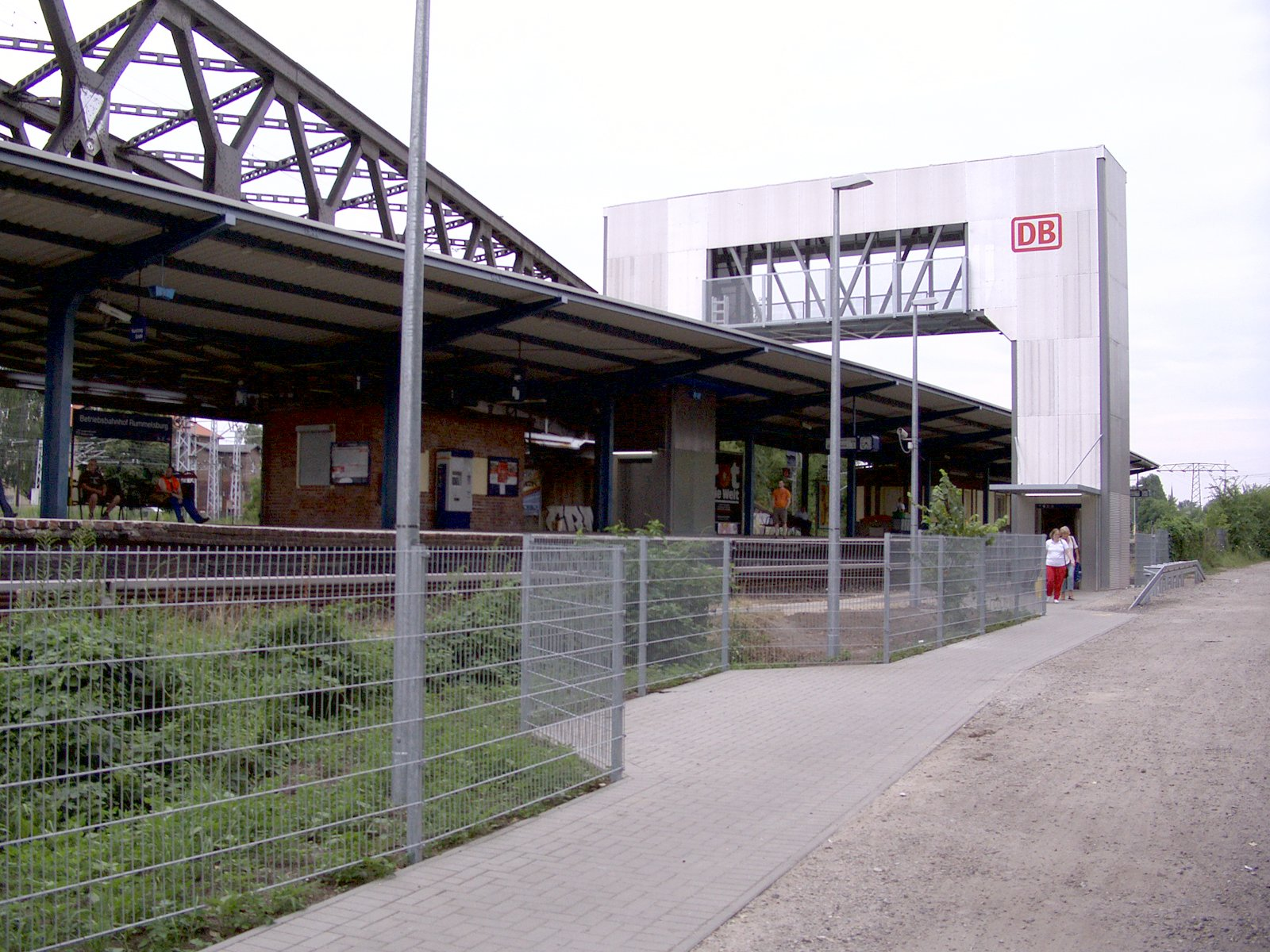
- The VnK line on the bridge (above left) in Rummelsburg

Overview
- Native name: VnK-Strecke
- Line number: 6070
- Locale: Berlin, Germany

Technical
- Line length: 7.8 km (4.8 mi)
- Track gauge: 1,435 mm (4 ft 8 1/2 in) standard gauge
- Electrification: 15 kV/16.7 Hz AC overhead catenary

The VnK line is a railway line in Berlin that formerly connected the Berlin Stadtbahn in Rummelsburg with the Prussian Eastern Railway in Kaulsdorf. The acronym may stand for Verbindung nach Kaulsdorf (connection to Kaulsdorf); Verbindung nach Küstrin (connection to Küstrin) or von und nach (from and to) Kaulsdorf or Küstrin are common interpretations. The western part of the line is still in operation. This single-track electrified line links the Stadtbahn with the Berlin outer ring (German: Berliner Außenring, BAR).

== History ==
Following the closure of the old Berlin Ostbahnhof in 1882 a connection from the Eastern Railway to the Stadtbahn was needed. A grade separated junction at today's Ostkreuz, where the two lines separated was not possible because there was insufficient space. Therefore, a flying junction was built two and a half km further east on the Lower Silesian-Märkische Railway near Rummelsburg marshalling yard. An eight kilometre line was built that by-passed Lichtenberg station. It was opened for passenger services on 29 January 1901, primarily for long-distance services.

After the Second World War, the new border with Poland ended long-distance traffic. Passenger trains to the east began in Strausberg or in Lichtenberg and no longer used the VnK line.

The opening of the first section of the Outer freight ring (GAR) on 31 December 1940 included a 1.2 kilometre connecting curve to the VnK, the so-called Grabensprung curve. It achieved importance after the war when the northbound track leading to the GAR was dismantled in 1947-1948 for reparations. In 1948, a short-term trial of a passenger service operated with railcars from Berlin-Grünau station over the GAR, the Grabensprung curve and the eastern part of the VnK line to Kaulsdorf. A temporary halt was established at the junction of the Grabensprung curve and the VnK line. The service was stopped after a few months.

In the autumn of 1966, the section between the two branches to and from the Outer ring was shut down. The eastern section of the line was converted in 1969 into a connecting line from the Outer ring from the south to Kaulsdorf. During the redesign of the Outer ring starting in the early 1970s a connection was built to the Eastern Railway at Biesdorf cross. As a result, the eastern section of the VnK line was no longer necessary. On 1 April 1978 the last train ran over the Grabensprung curve and the VnK line to Kaulsdorf.

From 1985 to 1988, the U-Bahn line now called U 5 was partly built on the path of the former VnK line to Hönow.

The western section of the line from Rummelsburg to the Outer ring, however, remained in operation and served traffic from Berlin Ostbahnhof to the outer ring running north. After the re-opening of the Berlin Stadtbahn in 1998, Regional-Express and long-distance services of the Stadtbahn ran over this route especially towards Stralsund. After the opening of the new North–South line through Berlin in May 2006, the importance of the VnK line was reduced. In 2009, it was only used by a pair of City Night Line services on the Munich–Berlin-Lichtenberg route and a pair of trains between Potsdam and Szczecin for stock transfer.
