= Louis-Lewin-Straße station =

Station of the Berlin U-Bahn

Coordinates: 52°32′20″N 13°37′06″E

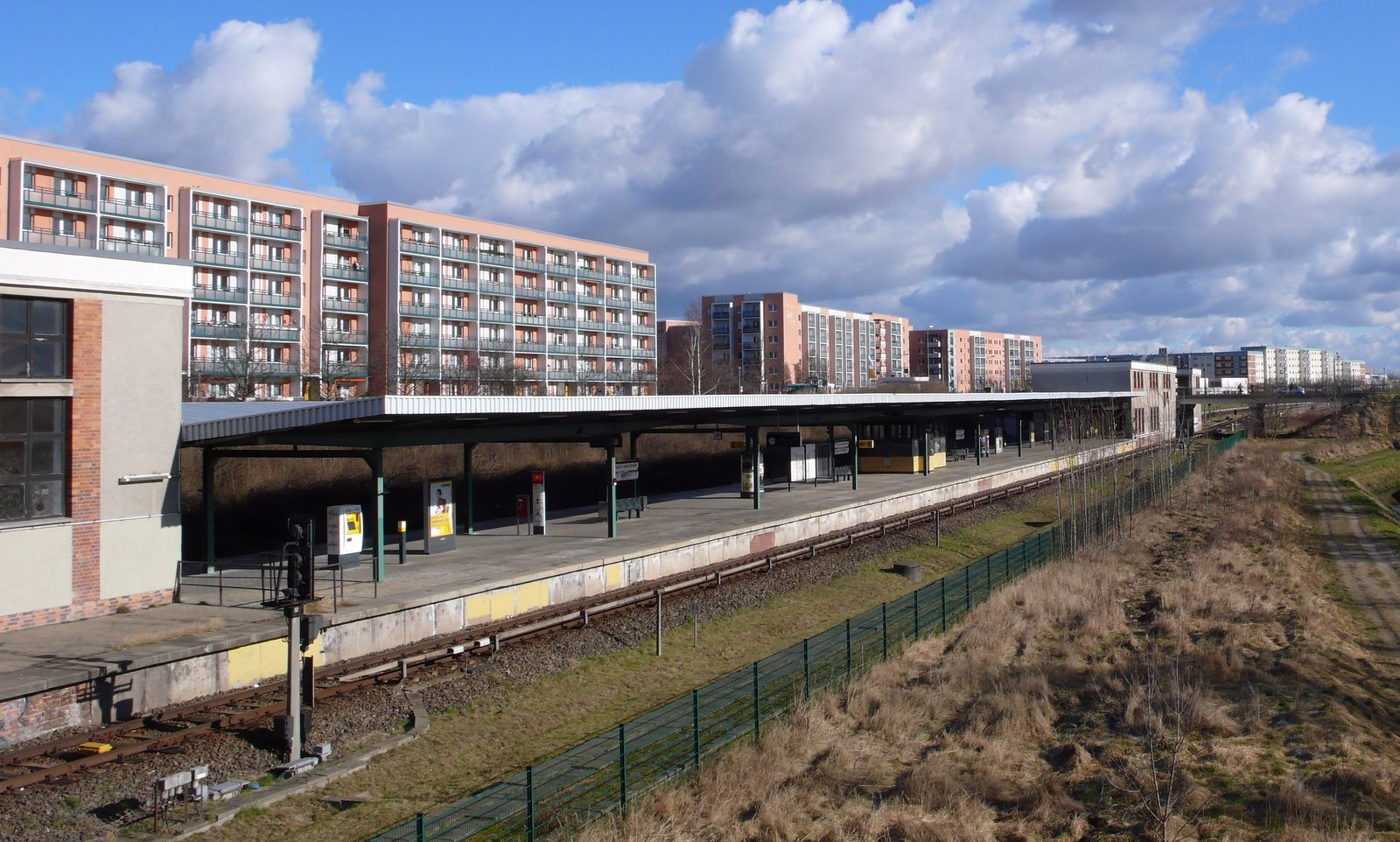

General information
- Line: U5
- Platforms: 1 island platform
- Tracks: 2

Construction
- Structure type: Surface Level

History
- Opened: 1 July 1989

Services
Preceding station	Berlin U-Bahn	Following station
Hellersdorf towards Berlin Hbf	U5	Hönow Terminus

Louis-Lewin-Straße is a surface-level Berlin U-Bahn station in the German capital city of Berlin. It is part of the Berlin U-Bahn; the station is located on the U5 line.

The station opened in July 1989, just a few months before the fall of the Berlin Wall. The station was formerly located in Hönow, and the surrounding area was annexed by Berlin during German reunification on 3 October 1990.

The eastern extension of (what is now) line U5 was one of the last major construction projects of the former German Democratic Republic.

It was originally called Hönow-West in planning stages. In 1989 up to 1991, the name of the station was Paul-Verner-Strasse; however, as P. Verner was an SED politician the name was changed after the reunification of Germany to the toxicologist and professor at the Humboldt University Lewin (1850–1929).
