= Berlin-Biesdorf station =

German railway station

Coordinates: 52.5131°N 13.5554°E

Biesdorf
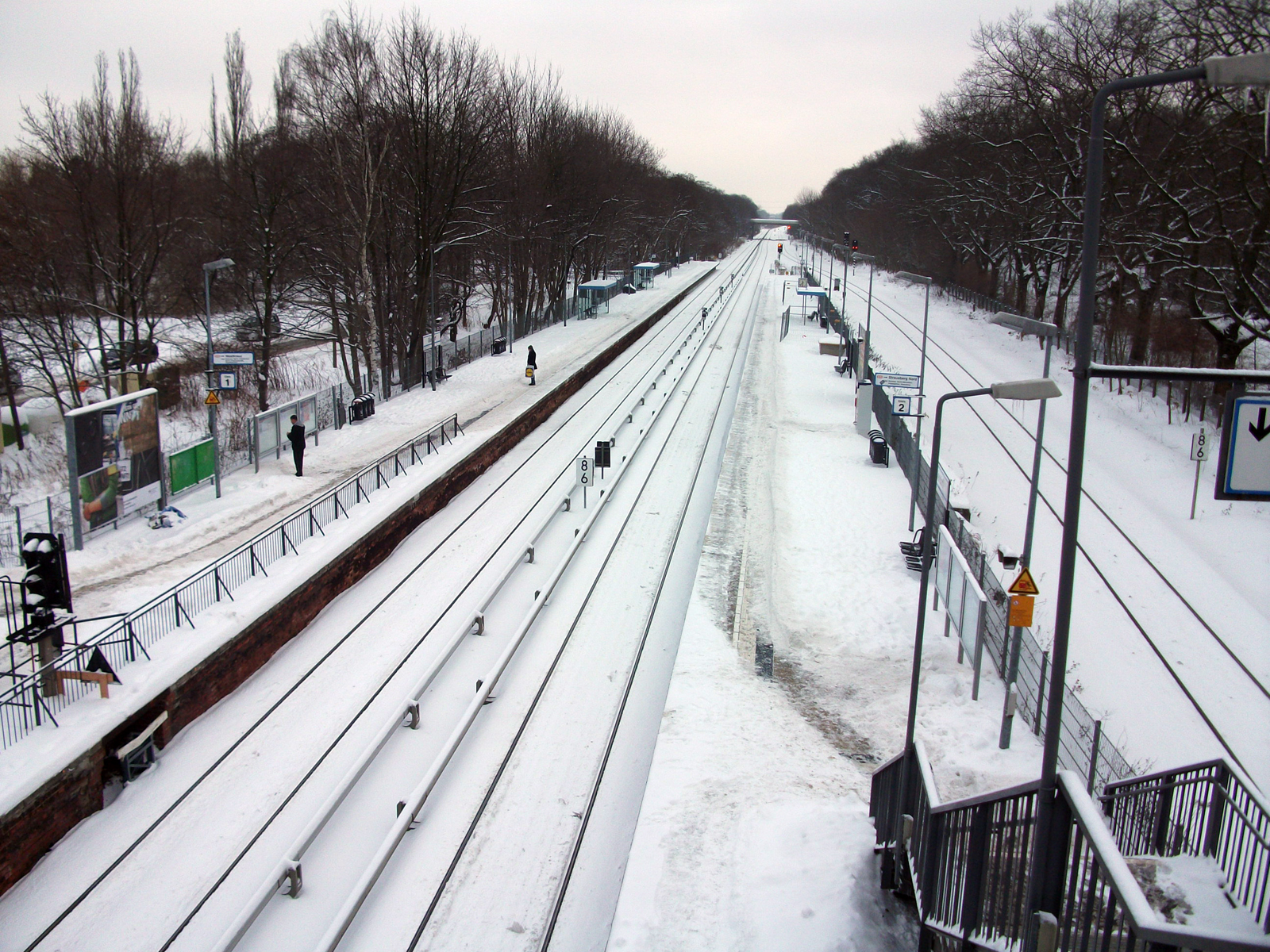
- 2010

General information
- Location: Oberfeldstraße 197; 12683 Berlin
- Owner: DB Netz
- Operator: DB Station&Service
- Line: Prussian Eastern Railway
- Platforms: 2 side platforms
- Tracks: 2
- Train operators: S-Bahn Berlin
- Connections: 192

Other information
- Station code: 631
- DS100 code: BBDF
- IBNR: 8089055
- Category: 4
- Fare zone: VBB: Berlin B/5656
- Website: www.bahnhof.de

Services
Preceding station	Berlin S-Bahn	Following station
Friedrichsfelde Ost towards Westkreuz	S5	Wuhletal towards Strausberg Nord
Location

Biesdorf is a railway station in the Marzahn-Hellersdorf district of Berlin. It is served by the S-Bahn line S5.
