= Hellersdorf station =

Station of the Berlin U-Bahn

Coordinates: 52°32′12″N 13°36′23″E

Hellersdorf
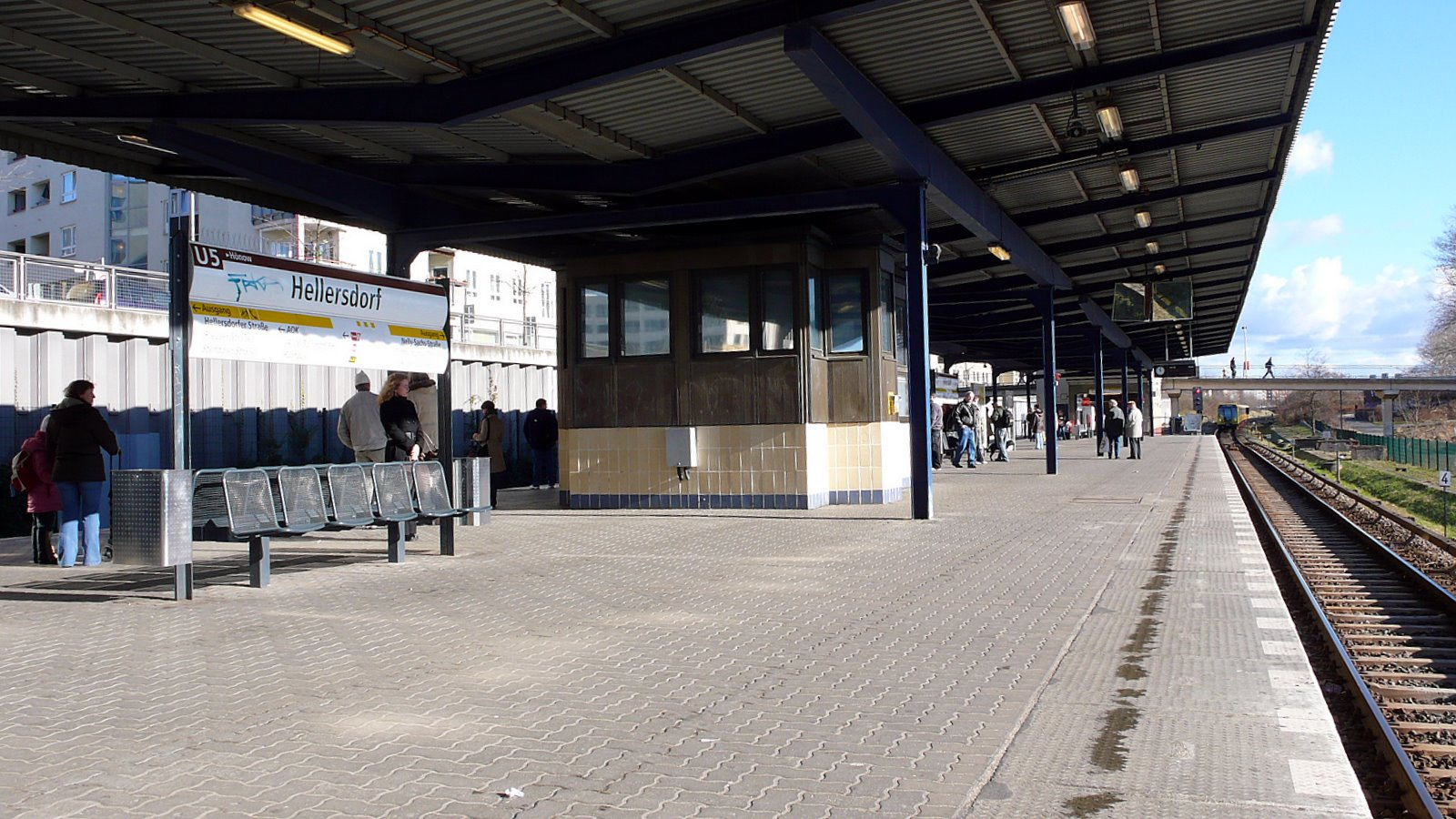
- Platform view of Hellersdorf

General information
- Location: Riesaer Straße/Hellersdorfer Straße; Berlin, Hellersdorf; Germany
- Owner: Berliner Verkehrsbetriebe
- Operator: Berliner Verkehrsbetriebe
- Platforms: 1 island platform
- Tracks: 2
- Train operators: Berliner Verkehrsbetriebe
- Connections: X54 195

Construction
- Structure type: Above ground

Other information
- Fare zone: VBB: Berlin B/5656

History
- Opened: 1 July 1989; 37 years ago

Services
Preceding station	Berlin U-Bahn	Following station
Cottbusser Platz towards Berlin Hbf	U5	Louis-Lewin-Straße towards Hönow
Location

Hellersdorf is a Berlin U-Bahn station located on the U5 line.

The station opened in July 1989, just a few months before the fall of the Berlin Wall. The eastern extension of (what is now) line U5 was one of the last major construction projects of the former German Democratic Republic.

The station was to be called "Kastanienallee" but was changed to the current name before opening.
