= Cottbusser Platz station =

Station of the Berlin U-Bahn

Coordinates: 52°32′02″N 13°35′47″E

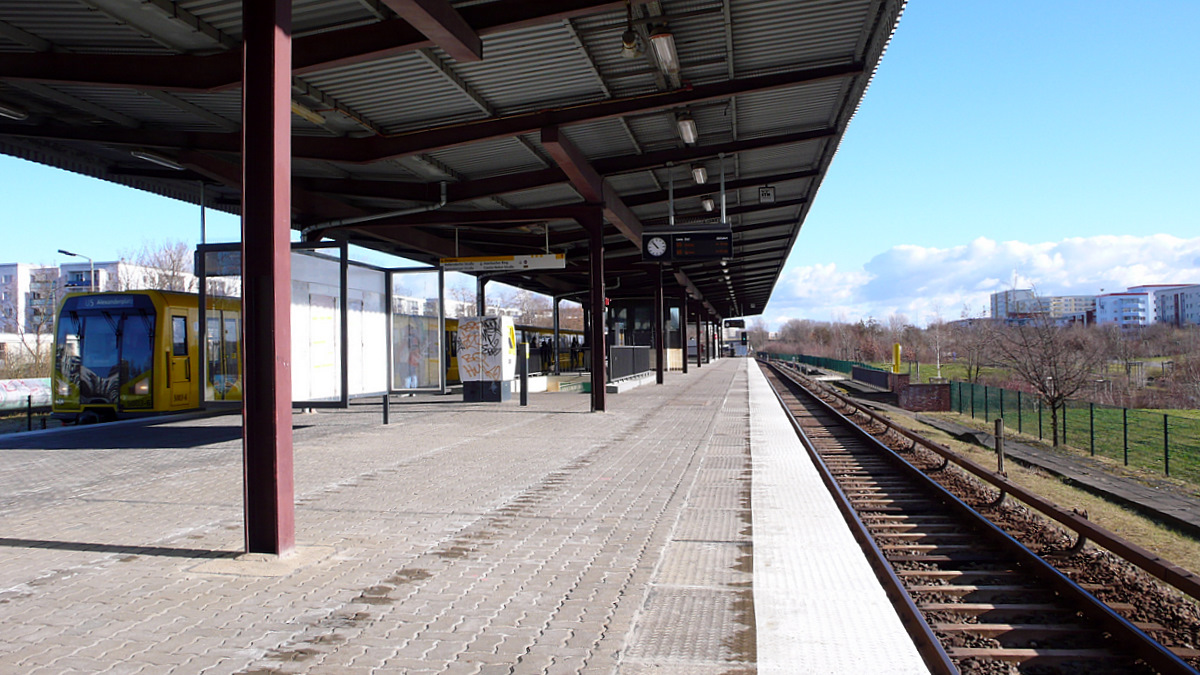

General information
- Line: U5
- Platforms: 1 island platform
- Tracks: 2

Construction
- Structure type: Above ground

History
- Opened: 1 July 1989

Services
Preceding station	Berlin U-Bahn	Following station
Kienberg (Gärten der Welt) towards Berlin Hbf	U5	Hellersdorf towards Hönow

Cottbusser Platz is a Berlin U-Bahn station located in the borough Marzahn-Hellersdorf on the U5 line.

The underground station is located south of the Hellersdorfer Straße, which runs parallel to U5 line, at the level of the same place. In contrast to the other stations of the route, the station is not in the incision, but slightly excessive. A pedestrian tunnel gives access to Hellersdorfer Straße north as well as to Carola-Neher-Straße and the Auerbacher Ring south of the station.

== History ==
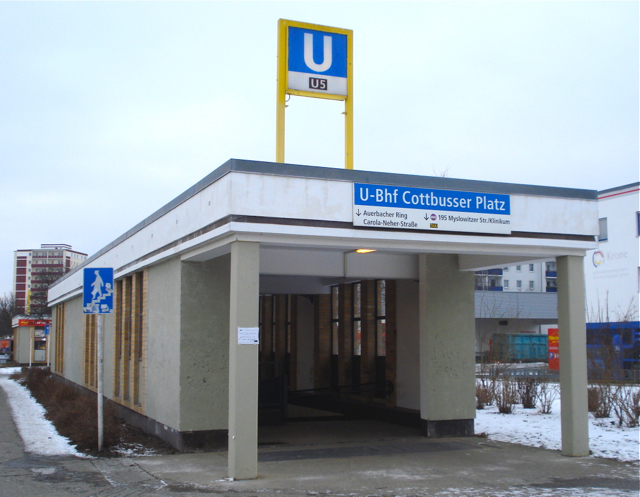
Station building the stations headhouse in 2012

The station opened in July 1989, just a few months before the fall of the Berlin Wall.

The eastern extension of (what is now) line U5 was one of the last major construction projects of the former German Democratic Republic.
