= Schillingstraße station =

Station of the Berlin U-Bahn

Coordinates: 52°31′14″N 13°25′16″E

Schillingstraße
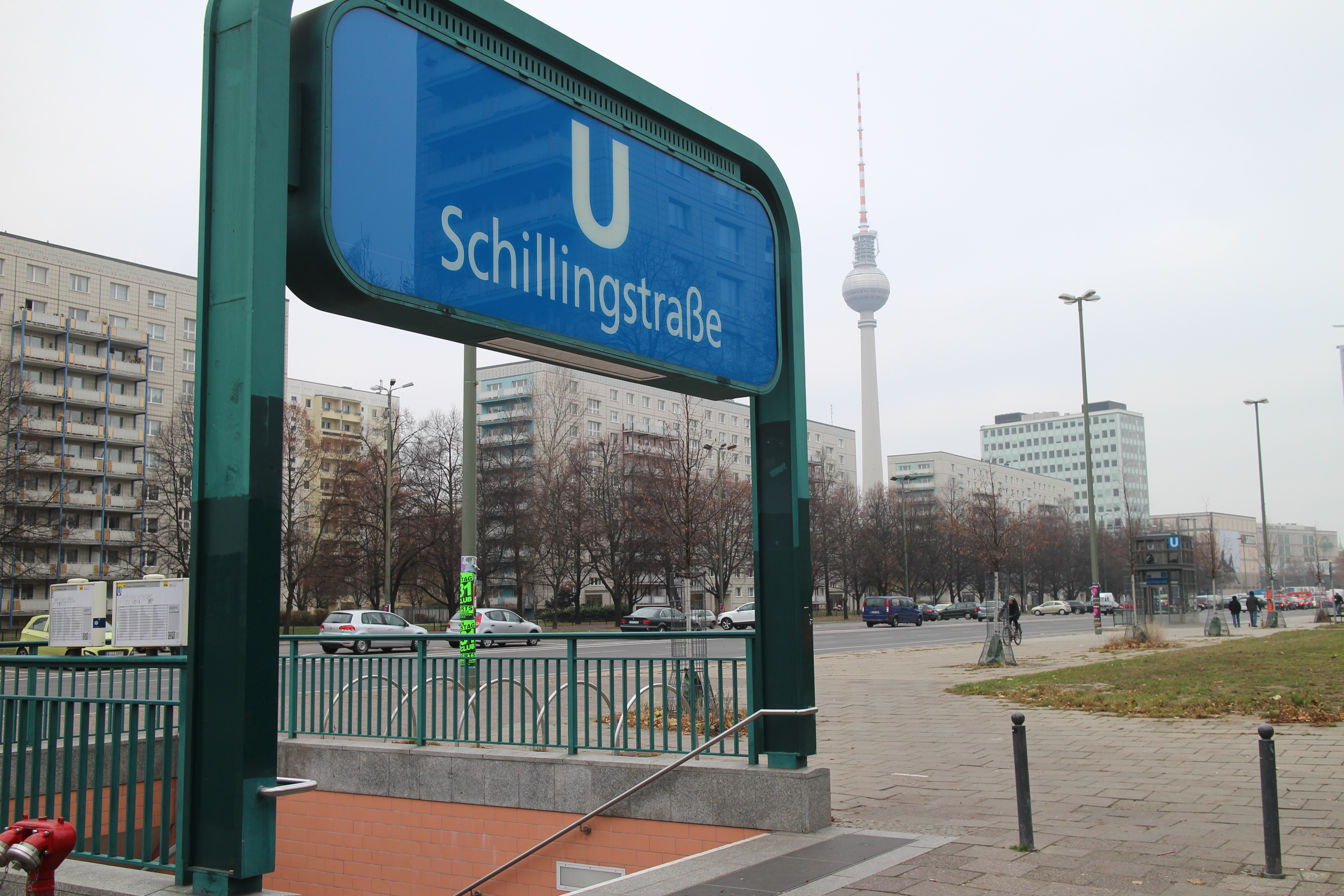

General information
- Location: Karl-Marx-Allee; Mitte
- Owner: Berliner Verkehrsbetriebe
- Operator: Berliner Verkehrsbetriebe
- Platforms: 1 island platform
- Tracks: 2
- Train operators: Berliner Verkehrsbetriebe

Construction
- Structure type: Underground

Other information
- Fare zone: VBB: Berlin A/5555

History
- Opened: 21 December 1930; 95 years ago

Services
Preceding station	Berlin U-Bahn	Following station
Alexanderplatz towards Berlin Hbf	U5	Strausberger Platz towards Hönow
Location

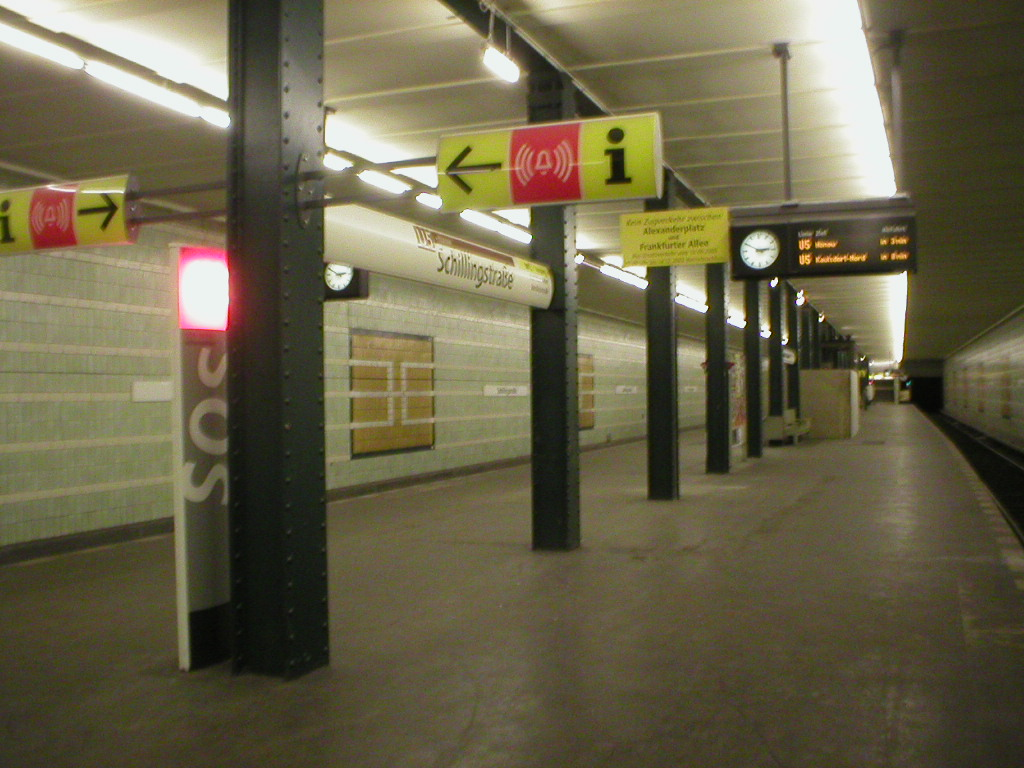
U-Bahn station Schillingstraße before its 2003 renovation

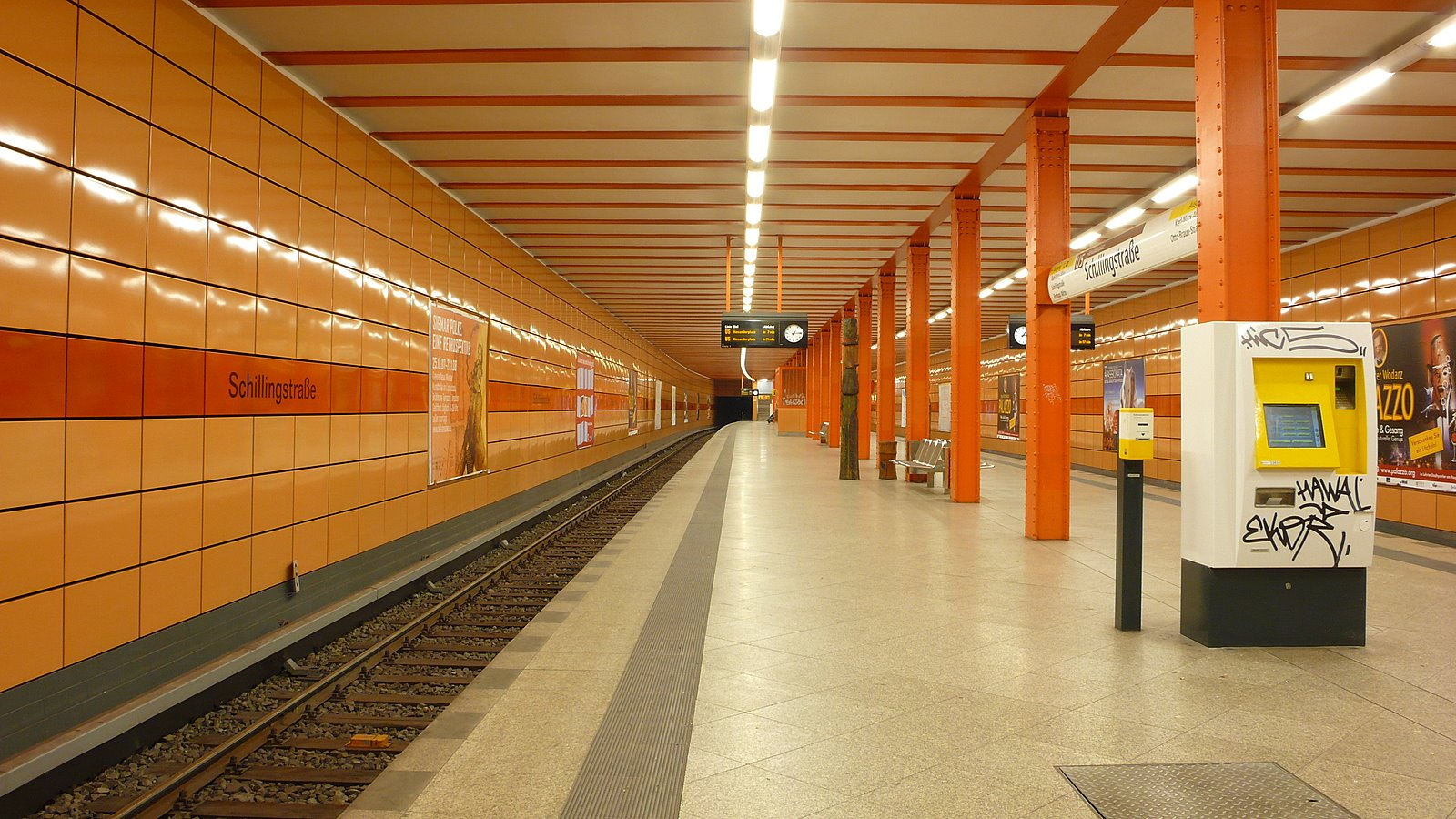
Platform after renovation

Schillingstraße is a Berlin U-Bahn station located on the U5.

== History ==
It was built in 1930 by Alfred Grenander. There was a total damage on 7 May 1944, and it was repaired by 1946. The western entrance was closed in 1959, and only eastern entrance exists. In 2003 the station was renovated again and orange/red panels were attached on the walls.
