= U5 (Berlin U-Bahn) =

Rapid transit line

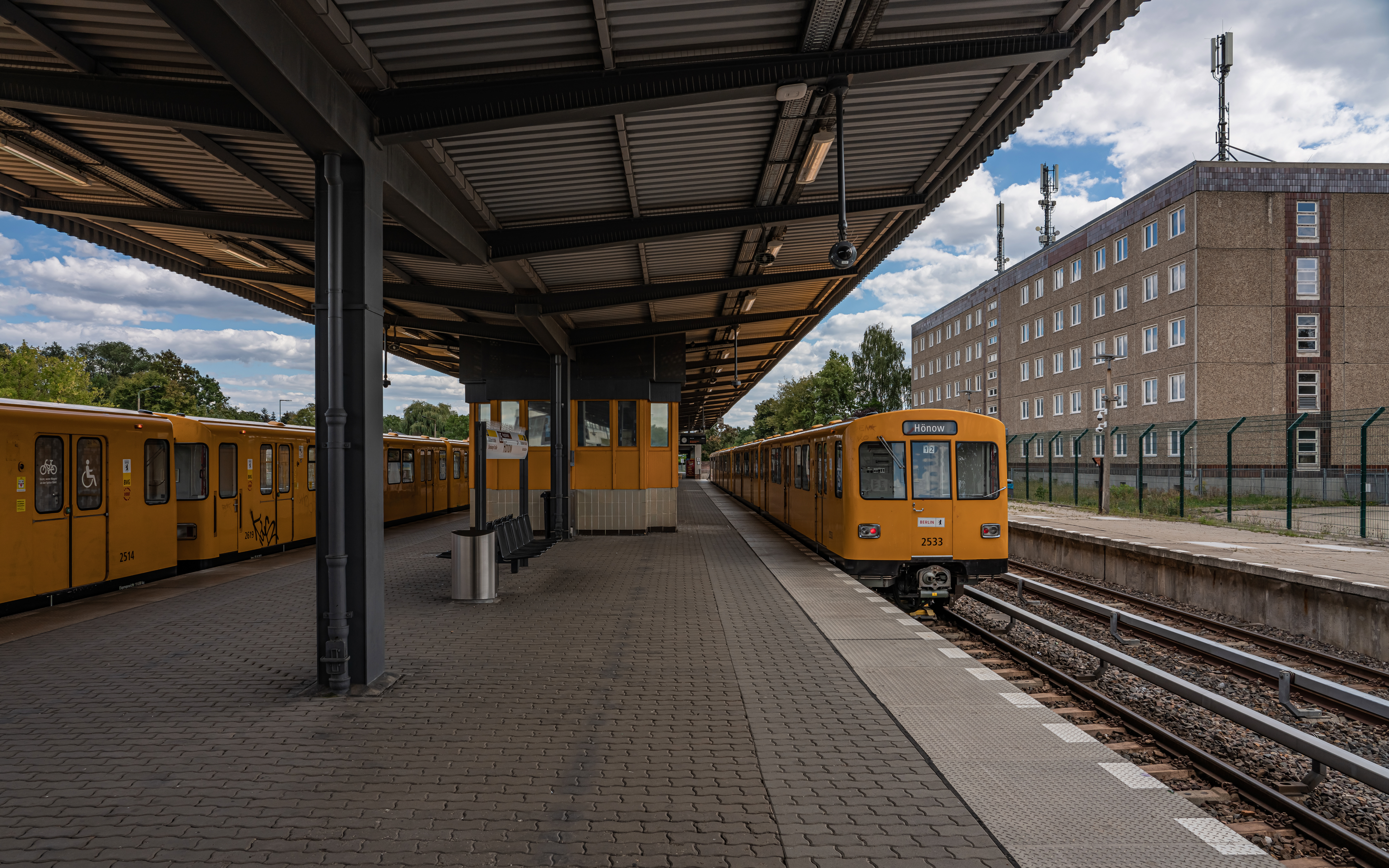
- Two trains at Hönow, the eastern terminus of the U5

Overview
- Locale: Berlin
- Termini: Hönow; Hauptbahnhof
- Stations: 26

Service
- Type: Rapid transit
- System: Berlin U-Bahn
- Operator: Berliner Verkehrsbetriebe
- Depots: Friedrichsfelde; Hönow
- Rolling stock: F74/76/79; H; IK

History
- Opened: 21 December 1930; 95 years ago (Note: From Friedrichsfelde to Alexanderplatz)
- Last extension: 4 December 2020 (Note: From Alexanderplatz to Hauptbahnhof, incorporating the former U55 shuttle from Brandenburger Tor to Hauptbahnhof)

Technical
- Line length: 22.1 km (13.7 mi)
- Track gauge: 1,435 mm (4 ft 8 1/2 in) standard gauge
- Loading gauge: Großprofil
- Electrification: 750 V DC third rail (bottom running)
Route map
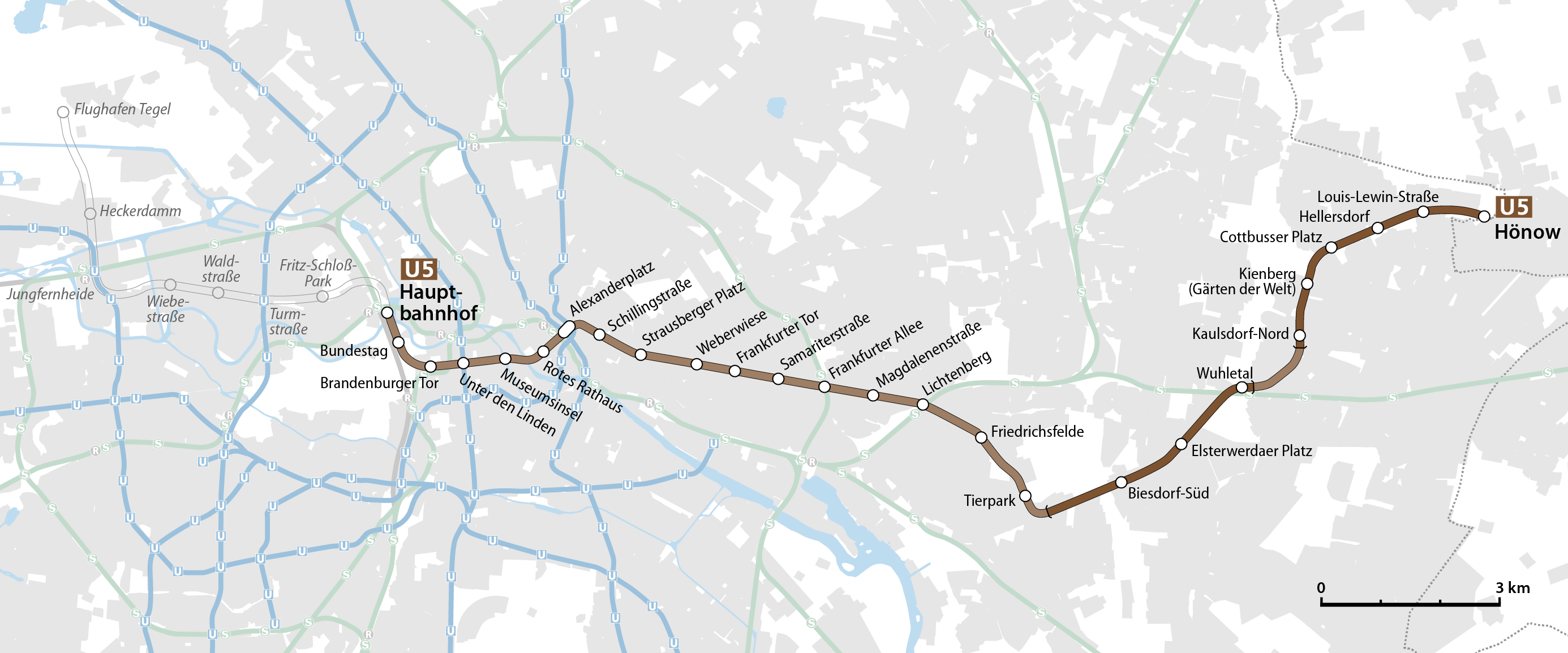

U5 is a line on the Berlin U-Bahn. It runs from Hauptbahnhof in Mitte eastwards through Alexanderplatz, Friedrichshain, Lichtenberg and Friedrichsfelde, surfaces in Biesdorf-Süd to pass Kaulsdorf and Hellersdorf above ground and finally reaches city limits at Hönow.

== Route ==
Line U5 connects Moabit with the large housing estate of Hellersdorf and the Brandenburg town of Hönow, but ends just outside the eastern city limits of Berlin. It begins at Berlin Hauptbahnhof (central station) and heads southeast under the Spree river, the Spreebogenpark and the Platz der Republik to Brandenburg Gate. From there it follows Unter den Linden, crossing line 6 at Friedrichstraße. After Museumsinsel station, the line runs under Rathausstraße, passing under the Humboldt Forum. After leaving Alexanderplatz, it takes a sharp right turn under Karl-Marx-Allee. It follows that street (which becomes Frankfurter Allee after Frankfurter Tor station) for several stations in a straight line in an easterly direction and crosses the Berliner Ringbahn at Frankfurter Allee station. From Berlin-Lichtenberg station, where it passes under the S-Bahn and the Berlin–Küstrin-Kietz railway, the line swings to the southeast. It runs under Einbecker Straße and then past the Friedrichsfelde workshop to Tierpark station. In a sharp left turn, the U5 bypasses Tierpark Berlin (a zoo) and reaches its southernmost point at this point. It turns to the northeast and reaches the surface for the first time.

Now above ground, the U5 runs through Biesdorf-Süd. It crosses Köpenicker Straße at Elsterwerdaer Platz station and a little later the street of Alt-Biesdorf, which forms part of both federal highways B 1 and B 5. It crosses the S-Bahn line and the Berlin–Küstrin-Kietz railway again at Wuhletal station. The line then runs underground along Gülzower Straße for a short distance. After a sweeping left turn, the U-Bahn resurfaces before Kaulsdorf-Nord station and runs north and later north-east. The line runs next to Hellersdorfer Straße as far as Hellersdorf, continuing to Louis-Lewin-Straße station and then running next to Böhlener Straße. Right on the city limits, but still within territory of Berlin, the U5 line ends at Hönow station, the easternmost point of the Berlin U-Bahn network at Mahlsdorfer Straße on the edge of Hönow.

== History ==
=== Early history ===
In 1908, before the opening of the section of U-Bahn line A from Spittelmarkt to Alexanderplatz (now part of line U2) in 1913, the Hochbahngesellschaft (Elevated Railway Company) planned to build a line that would run under Frankfurter Allee from Alexanderplatz to Frankfurter Allee station. Alexanderplatz station was to have two adjacent platforms and the line was to be built as an elevated railway from Koppenstraße, which was outside the city. The city of Berlin was receptive to these plans, but demanded that the line be built entirely underground.

In 1910, the Elevated Railway Company changed its plans: U-Bahn line E would now pass under Alexanderstraße so that it could connect with the already approved section between Spittelmarkt and Schönhauser Allee. This would have made it possible for line E services to run via Alexanderplatz into Klosterstrasse. The trains coming from Spittelmarkt and from Schönhauser Allee would have been able to run through to Frankfurter Allee and also in the opposite direction. This idea was never implemented.

The Elevated Railway Company controlled several private transport companies and so, at the end of the 1920s, the Nord-Süd-Bahn (North-South Railway) took over the final planning and implementation of U-Bahn line E as an independent line in Berlin's large profile network with the possibility of extending it towards Leipziger Straße/Französische Straße and with a connection to another line along Greifswalder Straße to Weißensee. The lines would merge at Alexanderplatz and separate again at Berlin City Hall (Rotes Rathaus). The Elevated Railway Company originally planned to run line E along a section of Landsberger Allee that no longer exists from Alexanderplatz to Büschingplatz (where Mollstraße now connects to Platz der Vereinte Nationen), where a station would be built. It would then turn into Weberstraße, which then ran to the southeast, and turn into Große Frankfurter Straße (now: Karl-Marx-Allee) at Strausberger Platz. In 1925, the city of Berlin received a suggestion from the private sector to insert a 180-metre (590 ft)-long curve between Alexanderplatz and the current Schillingstraße station, so that it would run through Große Frankfurter Straße and not through Büschingplatz as planned. There was also another change in planning that provided for line E not to end at Frankfurter Allee station, but to continue to Friedrichsfelde, because there was an area available there for a workshop.

==== Construction and commissioning ====
The construction work was carried out using the cut-and-cover method between 1927 and 1930. The line from Alexanderplatz to Friedrichsfelde was opened on 21 December 1930. Apart from Friedrichsfelde, all stations are located at such a depth that their exits on the sidewalks could be connected via distribution floors. The tunnel itself was built deep enough to allow ducts for the pipes of the Berlin water company, the cables of the Berlin electricity company and the telephone cables of the post office to be built above it at the same width.

=== Tierpark extension ===
A continuation of the Alexanderplatz–Friedrichsfelde section via Karlshorst towards Schöneweide was planned when it was completed in 1930. After the Second World War, plans emerged to extend the line to Tierpark Berlin, a new zoo established in 1955 at Friedrichsfelde Palace. In 1956, plans were developed to continue the line from Friedrichsfelde on two elevated tracks to a terminal station west of Straße am Tierpark at the entrance to Friedrichsfelde Palace. Two tracks of the carriage sidings of the Friedrichsfelde workshop were to be extended for this purpose. However, this project was not carried out because it would have made it difficult to extend the line further. In addition, traffic to the zoo was not seen as sufficient to justify the construction of the extension. When apartments were later built in the area of the zoo, the plan was taken up again, especially since the closure of the tram line on the street of Alt Friedrichsfelde as a result of the construction of the road bridge over Lichtenberg station had created a gap in the network.

==== Construction and commissioning ====
No official decision to proceed was taken or permit issued for the work for the extension to Tierpark station. Due to a lack of utilisation of the pile-driving capacity of the civil engineering VEB, construction began illegally at the Tierpark station, because the directors of the civil engineering company and the Berliner Verkehrsbetriebe (Berlin transport company; BVB) had carried out the first pile driving on 19 September 1969. The city councillor responsible for transport had no idea about this project. Much later, under public pressure, formal decisions were made and the required financial allocations were made for the continuation of construction of the one-station extension. It was decided to start construction at the end of the line in the area of the Tierpark station so that there was no need to fear that construction would be later stopped altogether. Official railway construction lasted from 1970 to 1973.

On the morning of 4 October 1972, a major fire broke out in the turnback siding on the north side of Alexanderplatz U-Bahn station on Line A (towards Rosa-Luxemburg-Platz station). To enable the tunnel shell, which had been damaged in the fire, to be restored quickly, a large number of precast concrete parts intended to be installed in the line extension in Friedrichsfelde were transferred from there. This led to the last minor construction delay. The extension from Friedrichsfelde underground station to Tierpark underground station was inaugurated on 25 June 1973.

=== Hönow extension ===
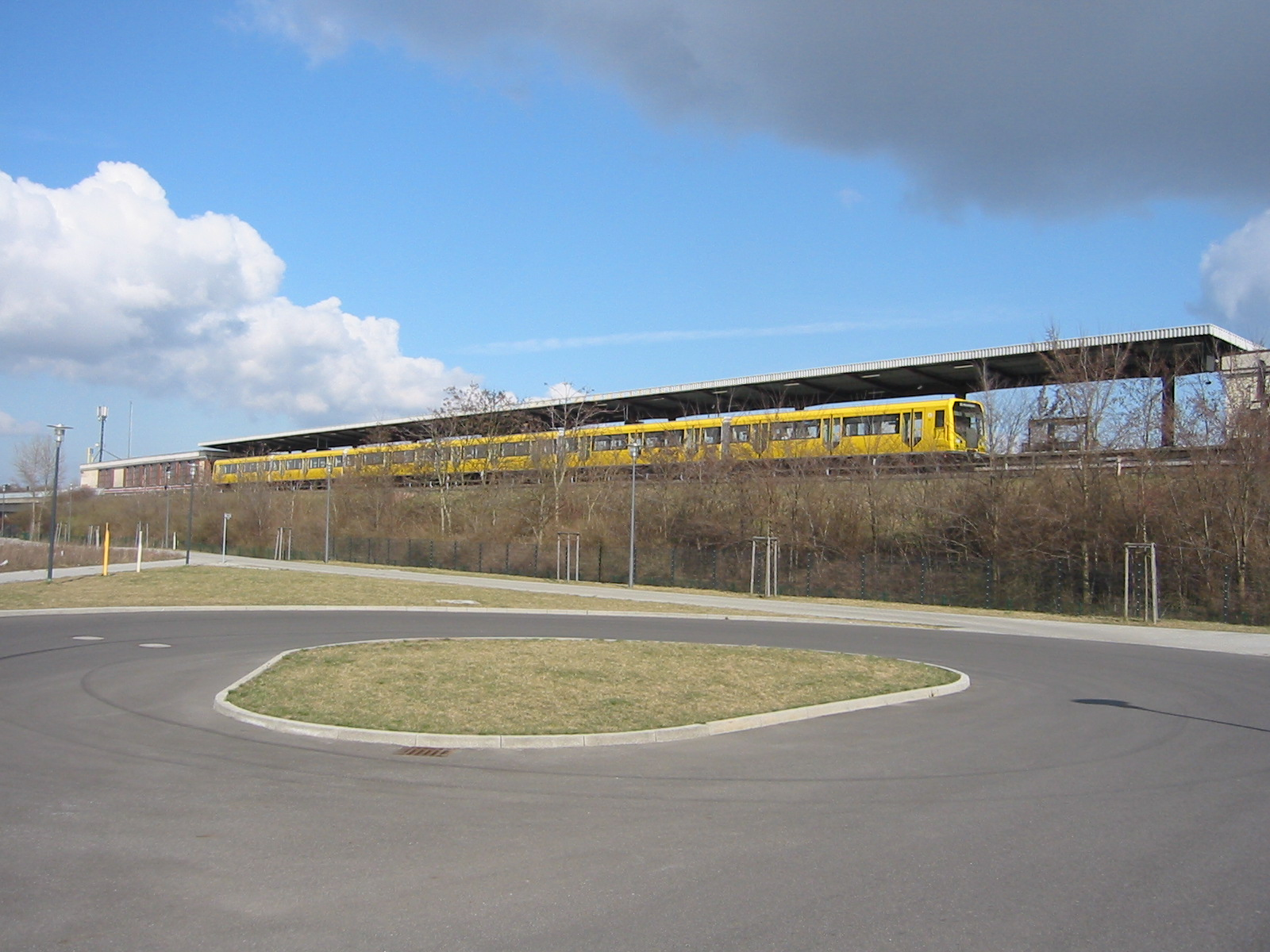
U5 train at Elsterwerdaer Platz

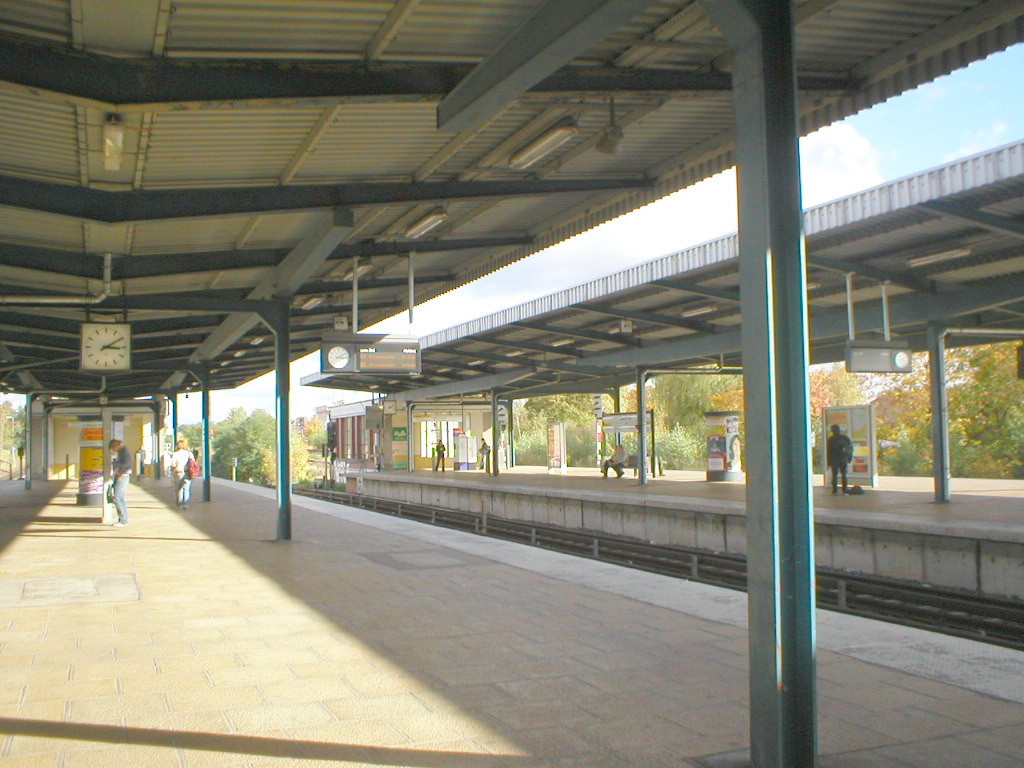
Wuhletal, the connection between the S-Bahn and the U-Bahn

The construction of the new housing estate in Marzahn began in 1977, followed by the new housing estate in Hellersdorf in the mid-1980s. At the beginning of the 1980s, the working groups of the Ministry of Transport of the GDR and the city council of Berlin investigated the construction of a rapid transit connection in the Kaulsdorf and Hellersdorf area. They examined and discussed S-Bahn, U-Bahn and tram options. In 1983/1984, it was decided to extend U-Bahn line E from Tierpark to Hönow. The option examined had the necessary reserve capacity, was economically justifiable and could be implemented in the planned period of time. Difficulties associated with the route had to be considered in the decision-making process. The original route planning for an extension of the U-Bahn line south to Schöneweide had to be abandoned. In addition, the connection from Tierpark station to the old line of the connecting or suburban railway to Kaulsdorf (VnK) complicated engineering and structural issues. The new underground line had to be connected to the VnK line directly behind the platform of Tierpark station in a sharp curve that was barely permissible and part of the turnback siding had to be demolished. It was also expected that expensive work to widen the railway embankment of the VnK route would be necessary and noise protection measures would have to be installed in Biesdorf Süd. On 27 February 1985, the Berlin City Council published a document that assumed that the section between Tierpark and Elsterwerdaer Platz would open on 30 June 1988 and the section between Elsterwerdaer Platz and Hönow would open on 30 June 1989.

==== Construction ====
Construction officially started on 1 March 1985. It was not built sequentially, but at several places simultaneously. First, earthwork and civil engineering work was carried out on the route and at the planned stations. So that the line could be connected to the Tierpark station, a 500-metre (1,600 ft) long tunnel was built on the complicated curved route on the VnK line. The VnK route to Kaulsdorf/Fernbahn route could not be used as it stood. It had to be partially removed, rebuilt and compacted. Old bridges located near Elsterwerdaer Platz, above Köpenicker Straße and above what is now the B 1 / B 5 highway had to be demolished and replaced with new ones to allow the widening of both roads. A 1.1-kilometre (0.68 mi)-long tunnel was built along Gülzower Straße between today's Wuhletal station and Kaulsdorf-Nord station. Extensive work was required on the Hellersdorf cutting from there to Cottbusser Platz station on Cottbusser Straße. Measures were taken to lower the groundwater and to provide deep drainage. The parallel running French drain from a septic drain field had to be replaced by pipes. The water from the Hellersdorf cutting was pumped into the enclosed ditch. The rest of the line from Cottbusser Platz station to Hönow station is approximately at street level with some ups and downs.

Track laying began in mid-February 1987, when the earthworks and the creation of the ballast formation had been completed on various sections of the line. A total of 30 kilometres (19 mi) of assembled track was built for the 10.1-kilometre (6.3 mi) route. More than 12 kilometres (7.5 mi) were required just for the multiple relocations of S-Bahn and long-distance train tracks near today's Wuhletal station. The S-Bahn traffic was maintained during the construction work, but short-term interruptions and timetable changes occurred.

As far as possible, construction machines from the stock of Deutsche Reichsbahn were used for the track construction. For this purpose and for the supply of material, an alternative construction connection point was established on the Berlin-Rummelsburg–Biesdorfer Kreuz Südwest line. In order to enable the use of long-distance rolling stock, which require a larger loading gauge, the cover plates of the platform edges of the affected platforms were only installed after track work had been completed.

Biesdorf-Süd station was provided with three platform tracks and an adjoining single-track turnback, because the previous one in Tierpark station could only be used as a siding due to the changed route. Another two-track line was built at the north end of Albert-Norden-Straße (now: Kaulsdorf-Nord). In addition, a spacious storage facility was established between the stations of Paul-Verner-Straße (now: Louis-Lewin-Straße) and Hönow. During the construction of Wuhletal station, the transfer group at Wuhletal signal box built a permanently usable track connection to the long-distance railway network for the first time.

==== Commissioning ====
Before commissioning, test runs were carried out on the 3-kilometre (1.9 mi) stretch between Tierpark and Elsterwerdaer Platz stations. After its successful completion, the section between Tierpark station and Elsterwerdaer Platz station was opened on 30 June 1988. The opening ceremony took place at Elsterwerdaer Platz station with brass band music and speeches by leading party and state officials. Exactly one year later, on 30 June 1989, the rest of the extension to Hönow station was opened. This time the opening ceremony took place at Tierpark station with the politician Günter Schabowski, several government ministers, the first secretary of the central council of the FDJ Eberhard Aurich, the mayor Erhard Krack and other officials.

=== U55 and final extension ===
There had long been plans to extend the U5 westward since the 1970s. The short U55 line opened in August 2009, and ran from Berlin Hauptbahnhof via the Bundestag U-Bahn station to Brandenburger Tor station. The designation of the line as U55 indicates that it was ultimately intended to become part of the U5 line.

Construction of the link between the two segments began in April 2010 and it opened on 4 December 2020. The link is 2.2 kilometres (1.4 mi) long, and connects Brandenburger Tor to Alexanderplatz. Along its route it serves new U-bahn stations at Berliner Rathaus, Museumsinsel and Unter den Linden, with the last providing an interchange with line U6.

=== Signalling ===
After reunification, the U5 was upgraded to the new signalling system under Systemtechnik für den automatischen Regelbetrieb (STAR - System technology for automatic control operation). The trial stretch extended from Friedrichsfelde to Biesdorf-Süd, using H-Zug trains, which were introduced from 1996 to April 2000. The Class H, used on the U5 could be converted to fully automatic train operation, and there still exists a 1995 Bombardier trial train, which is capable of operating automatically.

In contrast to trials with LZB 501, which used conductor loops, on line U9, and SelTrac on lines U2 and U4, STAR employed radio technology (Funkzugbeeinflussung).

In 2002 Berlin Senate decided that the U5 should not be extended further for the time being. Accordingly, the BVG announced that it would no longer pursue the project, since automatic operations would only be between U5 Alexanderplatz and Hönow and therefore not worthwhile.

At that time, the BVG was the technology leader in automatic operation in Germany. Driverless operation was used previously on the U4, however a driver continued to be present to supervise the ride. In 2008 and 2010 the underground lines U2 and U3 of the Nuremberg U-Bahn became the first automated subway lines in Germany.

=== Refurbishment ===
At reunification, the line was renumbered as U5 to match the naming system in use in West Berlin. Between January 2003 and December 2004, reconstruction was conducted between Alexanderplatz and Friedrichsfelde in order to repair damage dating back to World War II. Not all the stations were preserved as monumental value. 1330 meters of railway track and tracks were relocated. For this purpose, the train traffic on the route was interrupted for three months. The aim was to improve the quality of stay at the stations. The lighting has been renewed and made brighter, the technology has been brought up to date, the plaster has been extensively renovated and the walls have been clad in a vandalism-proof surface with enamelled sheet steel. The BVG took over Grenander's principle of identifying colors, but chose new color patterns. Numerous metro stations have been equipped with lifts and are now wheelchair accessible. An example of a completely new design, including the rebuilding of the northern end of the station, is the Schillingstraße station.

In time for the International Garden Exhibition 2017, and neighboring "gardens of the world", the station Neu Grottkauer Straße was redeveloped in the spring of 2017 to provide a lift, new roof and new lighting, and renamed Kienberg (Gardens of the World). The renaming occurred at the timetable change in December 2016. The cost of all measures has been estimated at around €6.6 million.

The latest stations, built between 1973 and 1989 from Tierpark to Hönow should be placed under monument protection, with the exception of this is the already significantly changed subway station Kienberg (Garten der Welt).

A refurbishment of the other aboveground stations built in GDR times is not planned before the middle of the 2020s. Equipping all stations with elevators to make them fully accessible is not planned until the lift program is completed on the rest of the metro network. The existing ramp systems with a slope of around 10% are only considered barrier-free.

=== Former U5 ===
There used to be a U5 running from Deutsche Oper to Richard-Wagner-Platz, from 1 March 1966 to 1 May 1970. Before 1966, it was numbered A^{I} and B^{I} and the branch line as A^{III}. In 1970, the stretch was closed and in 1974, the station was demolished.

== Plans ==
In the long term, there are plans to extend the line from Berlin Hauptbahnhof, via Turmstraße and Jungfernheide to Flughafen Tegel. This plan was postponed due to the route being too long, the closure of Tegel Airport, and Berlin's poor fiscal situation. An addition to the plan is an extension towards Rathaus Reinickendorf via Cité Pasteur Nord, Scharnweberstraße, and Eichborndamm.

The stations that were involved in the extension include:

- Alt-Moabit
- Turmstraße
- Huttenstraße
- Goslarer Platz
- Jungfernheide
- Hakenfelde
- Urban Tech Republic
- Cité Pasteur Nord
- Scharnweberstraße
- Eichborndamm
- Rathaus Reinckendorf

As of September 2016, the longer extension has been replaced by the tram extension from Hauptbahnhof, via Turmstraße, Mierendorffplatz, Jungfernheide, and towards Tegel Airport, which is planned to be redeveloped into a new Urban Tech Republic development after the airport is closed, thus allowing the U5 to be shortened to run to just Berlin Hauptbahnhof. The possibility of extending the tram line to Cité Pasteur Nord, Scharnweberstraße and Eichborndamm to Rathaus Reinickendorf remains in the vision stage. The tram extension was planned to be completed just before 2028.

Plans were revived in March 2023 under the "Express Metropolis Berlin", the route remains the same as before the U5 extension was cancelled in September 2016. North of Jungfernheide is parallel to U0, a proposed line under the “Express Metropolis” Plan.

At Jungfernheide, two island platforms were constructed for the planned interchange station between the U7 and U5. The finished section is used for firefighting exercises in conjunction with airport security and the BVG. Trains that are used in these exercises include 2712/2713 ('9 Zoolog. Garten') and 2714/2715 (Jakob-Kaiser-Platz), which were covered with legal spray painting. During the 1980 opening, Jungfernheide was in a deadlock because of the Berlin Wall conflict that prevented the U5 from extending towards the west.

== Frequency ==
U5's frequency is about 5 minutes during peak periods. Alternate trains will terminate at Kaulsdorf-Nord during off-peak periods, thus the lower demand section is 10 minutes. Since 2003, U5 has offered 15-minute weekend night service; the replacement bus service N5 was offered on weeknights.
