= Kaulsdorf (Berlin) =

- Quarter of Berlin
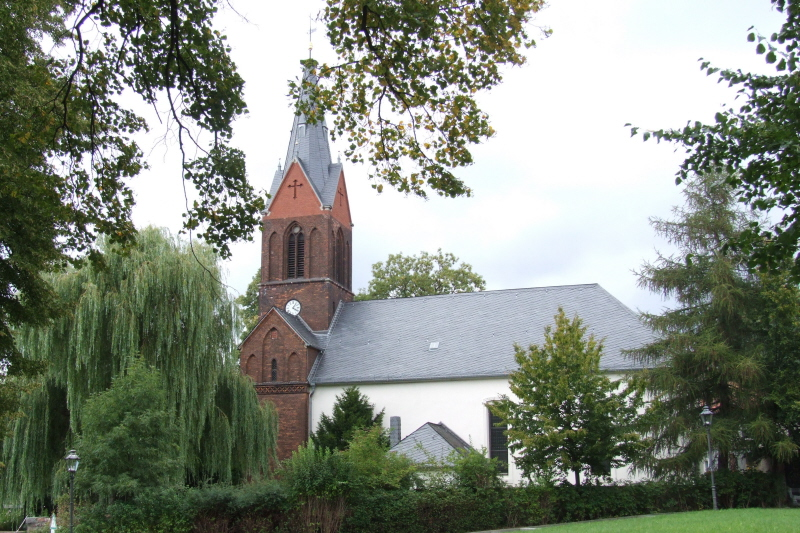
- Village church

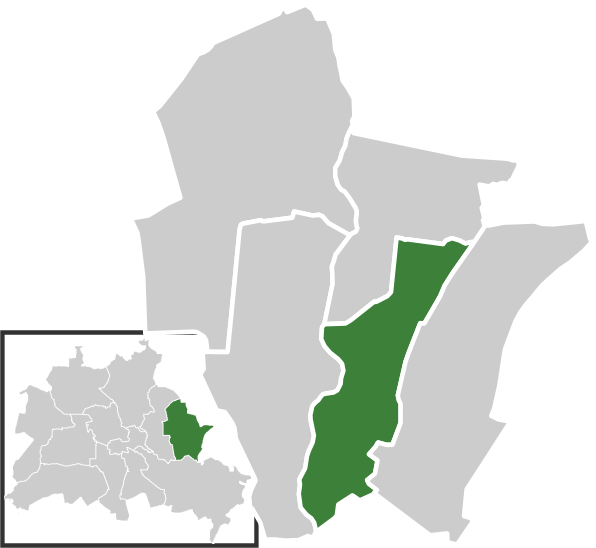
- Location of Kaulsdorf in Marzahn-Hellersdorf and Berlin
- Interactive map of Kaulsdorf
- Location within Germany Location within Berlin
- Coordinates: 52°30′29″N 13°34′51″E
- Country: Germany
- State: Berlin
- City: Berlin
- Borough: Marzahn-Hellersdorf
- Founded: 1347
- Subdivisions: 3 zones

Area
  - Total: 8.81 km^{2} (3.40 sq mi)
- Elevation: 52 m (171 ft)

Population (2024-12-31)
  - Total: 19,683
  - Density: 2,230/km^{2} (5,790/sq mi)
- Time zone: UTC+01:00 (CET)
  - Summer (DST): UTC+02:00 (CEST)
- Postal codes: 12621, 12619
- Vehicle registration: B

Kaulsdorf (German pronunciation: [ˈkaʊ̯lsˌdɔʁf]) is a locality within the borough Marzahn-Hellersdorf of Berlin. Kaulsdorf was incorporated into Greater Berlin by the Prussian Greater Berlin Act in 1920. From then on it belonged to the former borough of Lichtenberg until 1979, when it became part of the then borough of Marzahn. In 1986 Marzahn's eastern areas, including Kaulsdorf, were separated to form the new Borough of Hellerdorf, which was merged in 2001 to form the current borough. Kaulsdorf has, as of 2020, a population of 19,408 and encompasses an area of 8.8 km^{2}.

== History ==
The village was first mentioned as Caulstorp in a 1347 deed of gift by margrave Louis I of Brandenburg to the Kaland monastic brotherhood in Bernau. During the Thirty Years' War it was completely devastated by armed conflicts and epidemics.

== Geography ==
=== Subdivision ===
Kaulsdorf is divided into 3 zones (Ortslagen):

- Alt Kaulsdorf
- Kaulsdorf-Nord
- Kaulsdord-Süd

== Buildings ==
The village church (aka Jesus Church) dates back to the 14th century, its Romanesque apse may be preserved from a predecessing building. The steeple was attached in 1875 and today houses a small museum.

For the Modern Catholic church St. Martin built in 1929–1930, Charles Crodel from 1942 to 1946 created 26 windows and nine round windows as well as a mosaic wall and an enamel work for the altar.

== Transportation ==
Kaulsdorf is served by the S-Bahn train line S5 at the station Wuhletal and Kaulsdorf as well as by the U-Bahn line U5 at the stations Wuhletal and Kaulsdorf-Nord.
