= Kaulsdorf station =

Railway station in Berlin, Germany

Coordinates: 52.5121°N 13.5904°E

Berlin Kaulsdorf
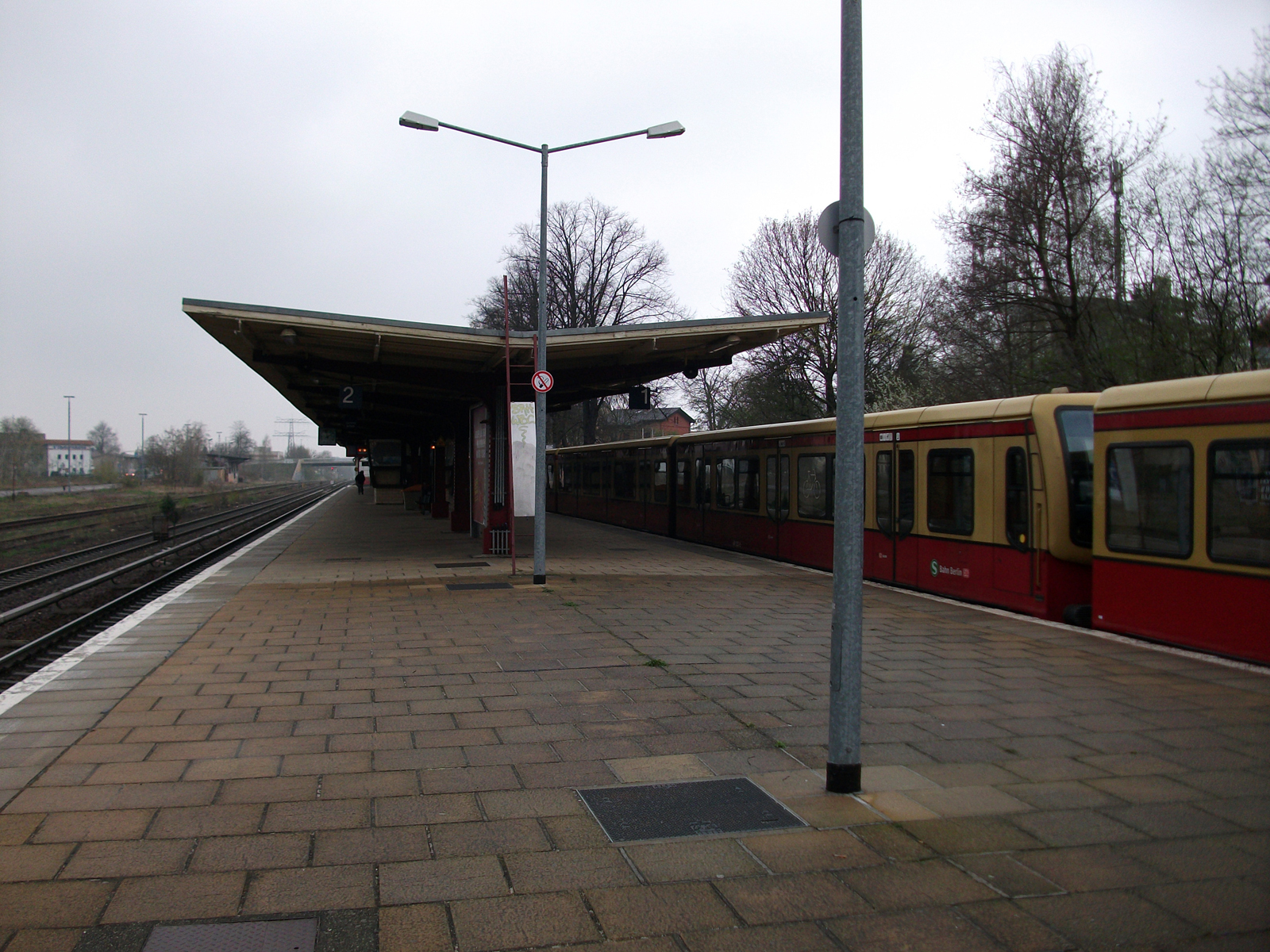

General information
- Location: Heinrich-Grüber-Straße 1; 12621 Berlin
- Owner: DB Netz
- Operator: DB Station&Service
- Line: Prussian Eastern Railway
- Platforms: 1 island platform
- Tracks: 2
- Train operators: S-Bahn Berlin
- Connections: 197 269 399 N95

Other information
- Station code: 547
- DS100 code: BKAD
- IBNR: 8089068
- Category: 4
- Fare zone: VBB: Berlin B/5656
- Website: www.bahnhof.de

Services
Preceding station	Berlin S-Bahn	Following station
Wuhletal towards Westkreuz	S5	Mahlsdorf towards Strausberg Nord
Location

Kaulsdorf is a railway station in the Marzahn-Hellersdorf district of Berlin. It is served by the S-Bahn line S5.
