= Hönow =

Ortsteil in Hoppegarten, Brandenburg, Germany

- Ortsteil of Hoppegarten
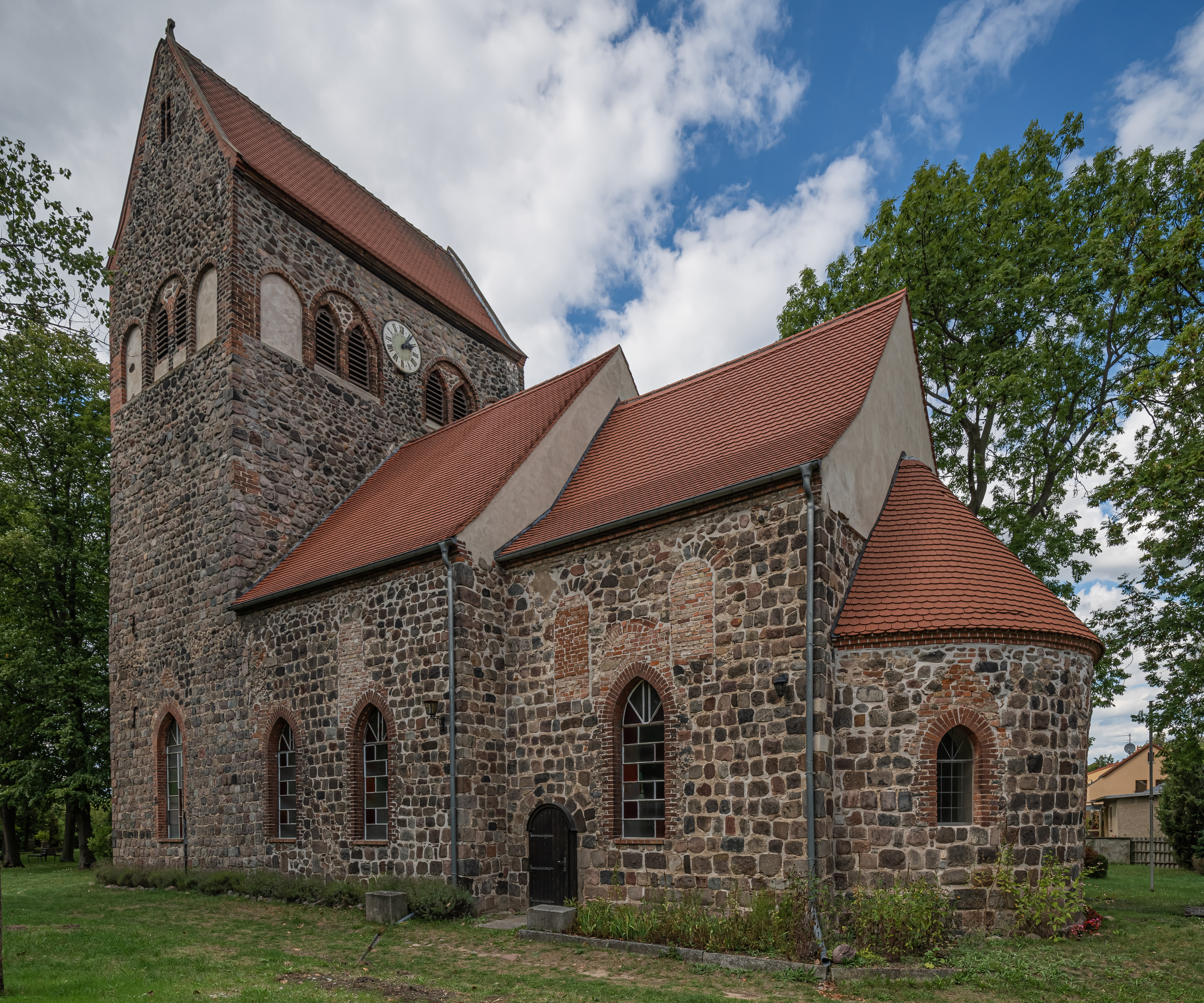
- Hönow Church

- Coat of arms
- Interactive map of Hönow
- Location within Germany Location within Brandenburg
- Coordinates: 52°32′54″N 13°38′16″E
- Country: Germany
- State: Brandenburg
- District: Märkisch-Oderland
- Municipality: Hoppegarten

Government
  - Mayor: Peter Schulze

Area
  - Total: 13.39 km^{2} (5.17 sq mi)
- Elevation: 61 m (200 ft)

Population (2015)
  - Total: 9,800
  - Density: 730/km^{2} (1,900/sq mi)
- Demonym: Hönower
- Time zone: UTC+01:00 (CET)
  - Summer (DST): UTC+02:00 (CEST)
- Postal codes: 15366
- Dialling codes: 03342
- Vehicle registration: MOL
- Website: Webpage for Hönow

Hönow (German pronunciation: [ˈhøːnoː]) is a village in Brandenburg, Germany, near the border of Berlin. An autonomous municipality until October 2003, it belongs to the municipality of Hoppegarten, in the district of Märkisch-Oderland, and its population is of 9,800 inhabitants.

== Geography ==
Situated in the western side Märkisch-Oderland, Hönow borders the city of Berlin (district of Marzahn-Hellersdorf). Its territory is detached from the rest of municipal area by a strip belonging to Berlin. Since October 2003 it merged in the municipality of Hoppegarten and a small section of it was ceded to Berlin in 1990.

Hönow is divided into 4 zones: Hönow-Dorf, Hönow-Nord, Hönow-Siedlungserweiterung and Hönow-West. Hönow-Dorf represents the middle of the village.

=== Landscape ===
Hönow's landscape is characterized mainly by the agriculturally used areas. Hönow also has its own forest, which is officially called Herrendike, but is usually referred to only as Hönower forest.

In the southeast separates the Zochegraben, or even Zoche, Hönow of Neuenhagen. It flows in a wide valley, but has a very narrow river.

To the north is the Narrow Lake, which is fed by a small stream that is mostly dry during the summer. From it leads an also dry in the summer in the Retsee, which is the largest of the Hönower Seeen with about 8 ha. This was originally fed by a small ditch that goes through the Herrendike and comes from the Steinhöfelsee additionally fed. From the Retsee another stream leads into the house lake, which lies immediately west of the village center. This is about 7.5 acres in size. Previously, both lakes were referred to as 1st, 2nd and 3rd sea, because the Retsee can be formally divided into two different lakes. (see Google Maps) From the Haussee the stream leads into the Hönower Weiherkette (German pronunciation: [ˈhøːnoːɐ ˈvaɪɐˌkɛtə]) where it becomes the Hellersdorfer Graben.

=== Hönow-Dorf ===
The district around the village green and Dorfstraße (in GDR times the "Road of Friendship") has preserved its village character in part. Hönow's oldest building is located here, built in the Middle Ages late Romanesque village church. The former Counts' Castle with a small castle park was located directly below the village church. After the Second World War, the destroyed castle was not rebuilt.

=== Hönow-Nord ===
The two one and a half kilometers away settlements north of the village belong to Hönow. In the parcel of land closest to the village, the Wöhrdetal, merchant and tea merchant Friedrich Glücks settled in the 19th century. His lucky tea brought him enough money to build on his approximately 20,000 m^{2} of land in 1900, a hunting lodge - the Glücksburg. The building had an imposing dome, a terrace and a wide outside staircase. Probably Friedrich Glücks was also one of the first settlers in this off the village parcel, which was sparsely populated around 1932.

After the Second World War, the family Glücks was initially expropriated in the course of land reform and a family fish got the property. The name Glücksburg was erased from maps and other documents, but remained popularly preserved. The settlements north of the village appeared under the name Hönow-Nord in the maps. The Fischs had to vacate the Glücksburg area from 1960, when the state security wanted to build a holiday and training center here.

In addition to the over the decades strongly rebuilt main building, which was hardly recognizable as a hunting lodge in the 1970s, there are still several small buildings on the property, which were used commercially after 1989. Behind the buildings is a wild forest and seascape.

500 meters north of the former Glücksburg is in the direction of Mehrow another settlement called Am Schleipfuhl, named after a pond on the Mehrower Straße.

=== Hönow-Siedlungserweiterung ===
The Hönower settlement expansion has its origins in the development of fallow land in the mid-1990s. Gradually, terraced, semi-detached and detached houses, as well as multi-storey modern residential complexes. Within the settlement extension, a green belt has been created, which is crossed by small pools, long walks and some playgrounds. This is a kind of extension to the nature reserve Hönower Weiherkette, which was incorporated during the settlement expansion of Berlin in the 1980s in the district Hellersdorf. In addition, three day care centers and two additional supermarket complexes were built. Smaller businesses on the lower floors of the residential complex and a recycling center complement the infrastructure in addition to an existing local transport connection to the local underground station Hönow. Since the spring of 2018, a new school building for the Grimm Brothers Primary School has been built on Schulstraße east of the green corridor. In addition, a new community center for Hönow is being built on Brandenburgische Straße.

== History ==
Formerly Hönow was settled by the Slavs. In the 13th century Johann I and Otto III built a settlement at this place, which was mentioned first in the landbook of Charles IV, Holy Roman Emperor. The village was destroyed in the Hussite Wars and in the Thirty Years' War, at the beginning of the 17th century. The castle of Hönow was damaged in the Second World War and does not exist anymore. The only old building which has survived in Hönow is the old Romanesque church.

== Transportation ==
Hönow is a Berlin U-Bahn station and the eastern terminus of the U5 line. Located at the borders of the Berliner ward of Hellersdorf, the station borders Hönow, a village of the Hoppegarten municipality in the state of Brandenburg. This station was later incorporated into Berlin during the reunification.

== Photogallery ==
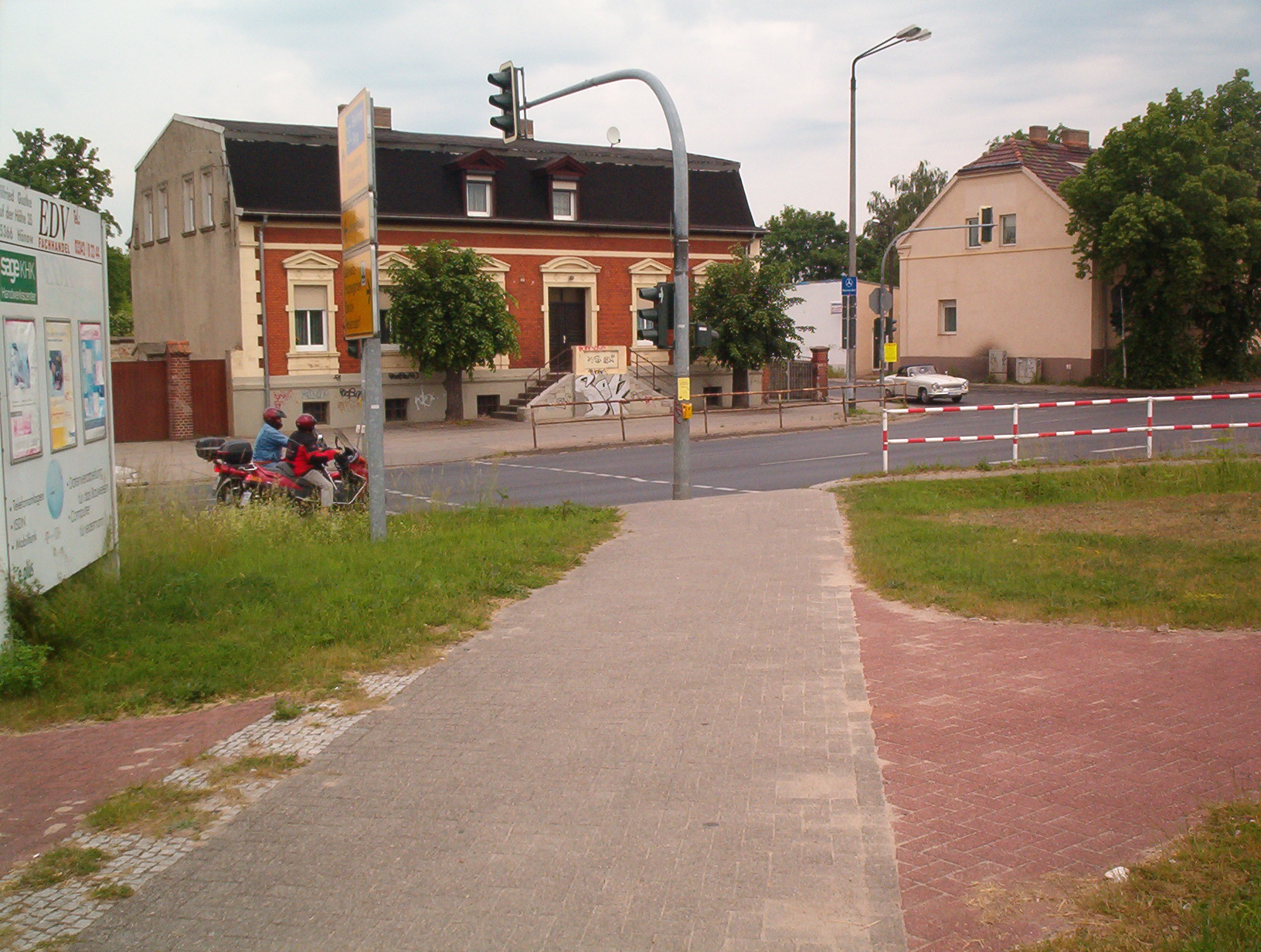
Landsberger Allee at Hönow-Dorf

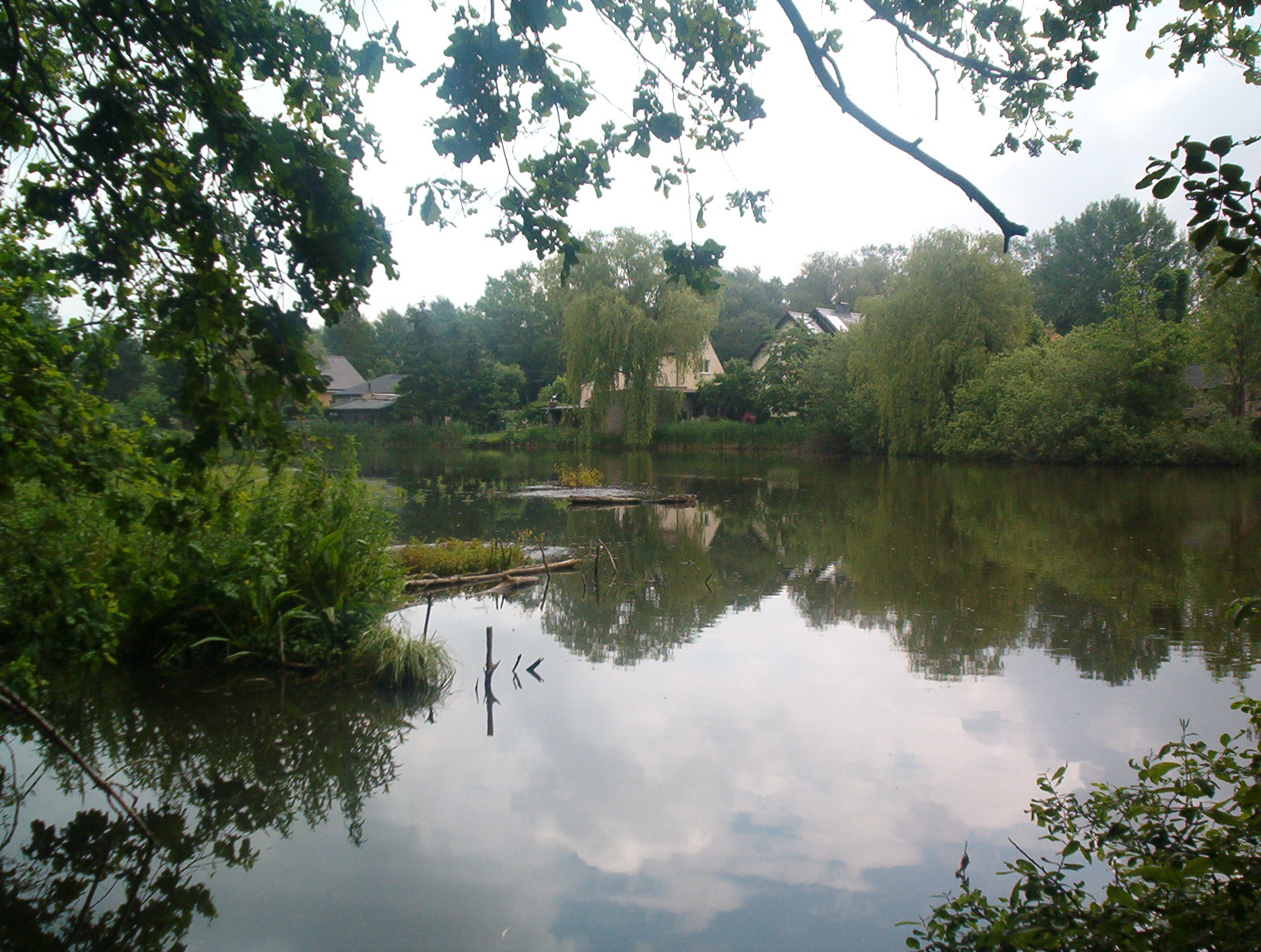
Retsee lake at Hönow-Nord

== See also ==
- Hönow U-Bahn station
