= Kaulsdorf-Nord station =

Station of the Berlin U-Bahn

Coordinates: 52°31′16″N 13°35′20″E

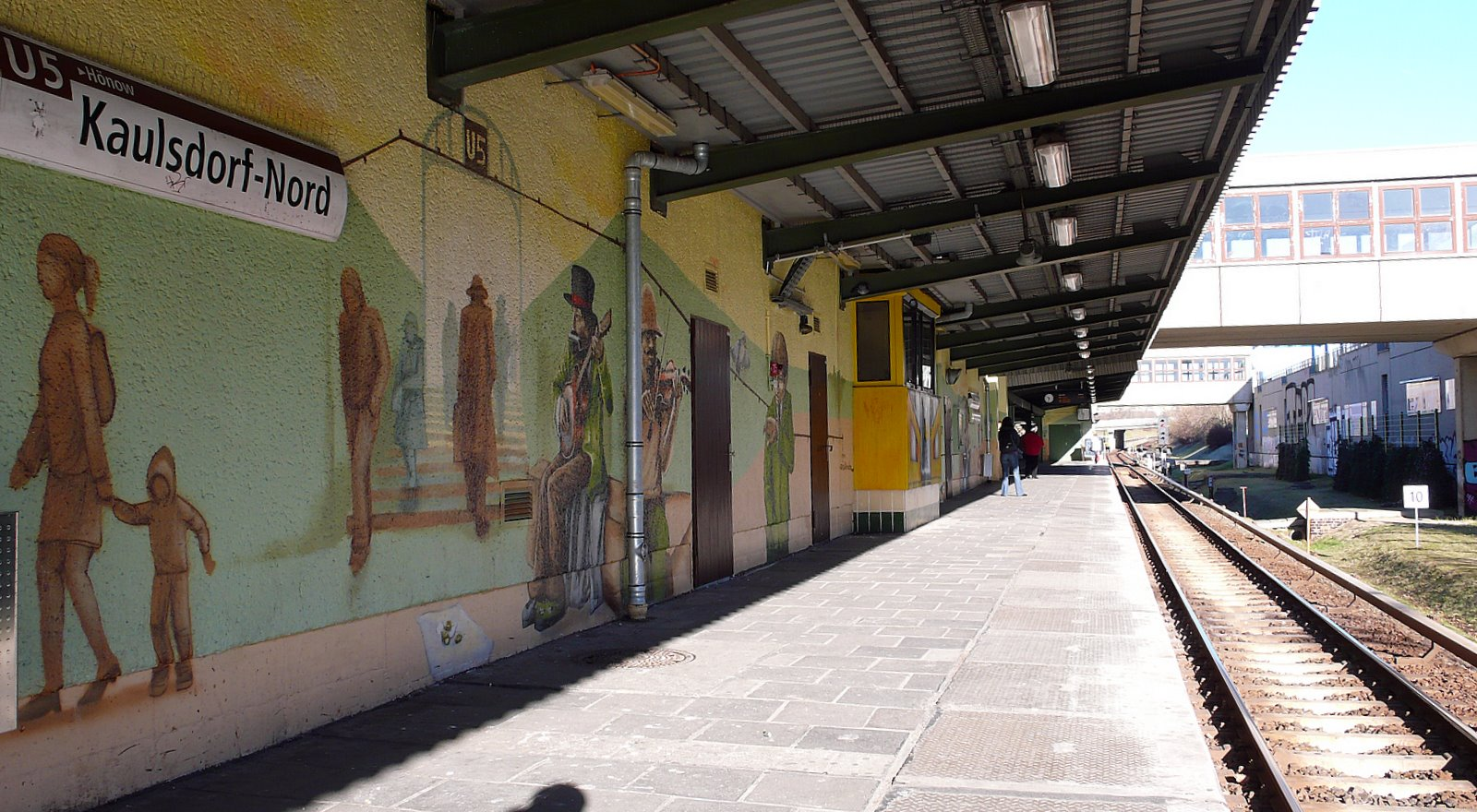

General information
- Line: U5
- Platforms: 2 side platforms
- Tracks: 2

Construction
- Structure type: Surface Level

History
- Opened: 1 July 1989
- Former names: Albert-Norden-Straße (1989-1991)

Services
Preceding station	Berlin U-Bahn	Following station
Wuhletal towards Berlin Hbf	U5	Kienberg (Gärten der Welt) towards Hönow

Kaulsdorf-Nord is a surface level Berlin U-Bahn station located on the U5. Alternate trains from Hauptbanhof will end at this station.

== History ==
The station was originally named Hellersdorfer Straße in the planning stage. The station opened in July 1989, just a few months before the fall of the Berlin Wall. The eastern extension of the line E was one of the last major construction projects of the former German Democratic Republic.

In the beginning the name was Albert-Norden-Straße. On 2 October 1991, after the reunification the road was changed to Cecilienstraße while the station's name is renamed to Kaulsdorf Nord.
