= Marzahn-Hellersdorf =

- Borough of Berlin
- Flag Coat of arms

- Location of Marzahn-Hellersdorf in Berlin
- Interactive map of Marzahn-Hellersdorf
- Location within Germany Location within Berlin
- Coordinates: 52°32′N 13°35′E
- Country: Germany
- State: Berlin
- City: Berlin
- Subdivisions: 5 localities

Government
  - Mayor: Gordon Lemm (SPD)

Area
  - Total: 61.74 km^{2} (23.84 sq mi)

Population (2024-12-31)
  - Total: 282,847
  - Density: 4,581/km^{2} (11,870/sq mi)
- Time zone: UTC+01:00 (CET)
  - Summer (DST): UTC+02:00 (CEST)
- Vehicle registration: B
- Website: Official homepage

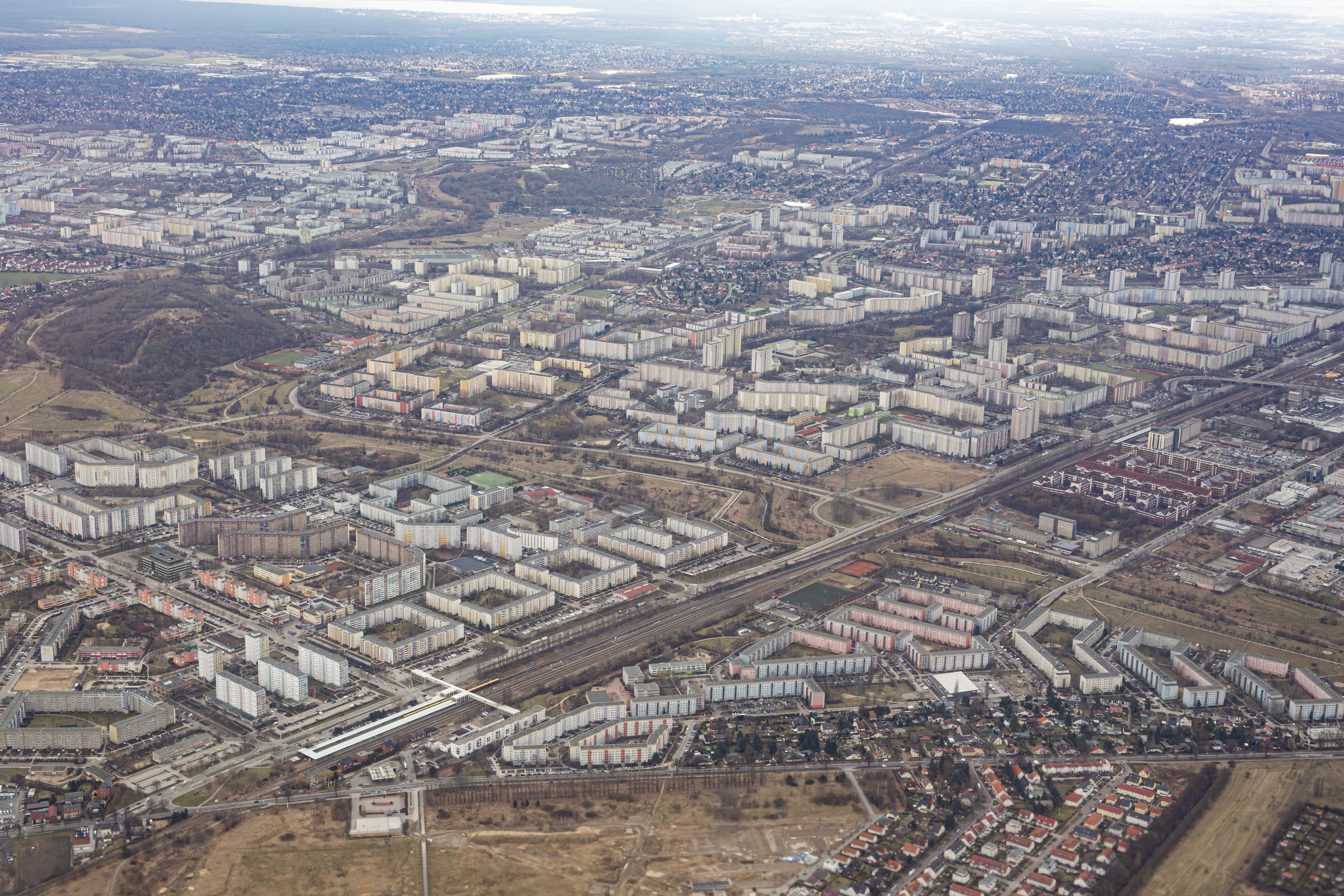
View of Marzahn

Marzahn-Hellersdorf (German: [maʁˈtsaːn ˈhɛlɐsdɔʁf]) is the tenth borough of Berlin, formed in 2001 by merging the former boroughs of Marzahn and Hellersdorf.

The borough was formerly part of East Berlin.

== Geography ==
It is situated in the northeast of Berlin. Marzahn-Hellersdorf borders to the Berlin boroughs of Lichtenberg in the west and Treptow-Köpenick in the south as well as to the Brandenburg municipalities of Ahrensfelde in the north and Hoppegarten and Neuenhagen in the east.

== Demographics ==
As of 2010, the borough had a total population 248,264, of whom about 30,000 (12%) were of non-German origin (migration background). Therefore, it is considered to be the least ethnically diverse borough of Berlin with the highest percentage of Ethnic Germans. Although the immigrant minority is relatively small, the borough has a higher concentration of Russia-born, Kazakhstan-born (e.g. Volga Germans) and Vietnamese people as compared to other parts of the city. Recently, there has been a significant influx of people with Middle Eastern and Muslim backgrounds.

Percentage of the population with migration background	
Germans without migration background	88 % (218.500)
Germans with migration background + Foreigners	12 % (30.000)
Middle Eastern/Muslim migration background (Turkey, Arab League, Iran etc.)	3,1% (7.800)
Russian background	2,7% (6.900)
Kazakh background	2,0% (5.200)
Vietnamese background	1,2% (3.100)
Others (EU-Europeans, other East Asians, Afro-Germans etc.)	6,1% (14.800)

== Subdivision ==
Subdivisions of Marzahn-Hellersdorf

The borough consists of five former villages which all became part of Greater Berlin in 1920:

- Biesdorf
- Hellersdorf
- Kaulsdorf
- Mahlsdorf
- Marzahn

== History ==
Each of the five districts the borough consists of originally came from one administrative district called "Landkreis Niederbarnim" and were incorporated into the city due to the establishment of Greater Berlin in 1920. Together with the two other boroughs Lichtenberg and Friedrichsfelde, they formed the borough Lichtenberg until 1979. At the end of the 1970s especially the district Marzahn grew as a result of the building of the developing area Marzahn. Consequently, Marzahn was formed out of the five districts the borough consists of today in 1979.

As a result of the building of two more developing areas (Hellersdorf and Kaulsdorf) the number of inhabitants increased so that the borough Hellersdorf was founded out of the three districts Hellersdorf, Kaulsdorf and Mahlsdorf on 1 June 1986. The borough remained independent until 2001.

In view of whole Berlin, Marzahn-Hellersdorf shows the biggest changes concerning demography. In 1991 the average age of the two boroughs reached a number of 30,5 years which increased to 39,6 years due to the migration of the younger people.

== Politics ==
=== District council ===
The governing body of Marzahn-Hellersdorf is the district council (Bezirksverordnetenversammlung). It has responsibility for passing laws and electing the city government, including the mayor. The most recent district council election was held on 26 September 2021, and the results were as follows:

Party	Lead candidate	Votes	%	+/-	Seats	+/-
Christian Democratic Union (CDU)	Nadja Zivkovic	28,430	20.8	▲3.5	12	▲1
Social Democratic Party (SPD)	Gordon Lemm	27,742	20.3	▲2.0	12	▲1
The Left (LINKE)	Juliane Witt	27,233	19.9	▼6.1	11	▼5
Alternative for Germany (AfD)	Jeannette Auricht	23,108	16.9	▼6.3	10	▼5
Alliance 90/The Greens (Grüne)	Chantal Münster	9,455	6.9	▲2.3	4	▲2
Free Democratic Party (FDP)	Anja Molnar	7,258	5.3	▼2.8	3	▲3
Tierschutzpartei	Ina Seidel-Grothe	6,858	5.0	New	3	New
Die PARTEI		3,146	2.3	New	0	New
dieBasis		2,365	1.7	New	0	New
The Humanists		747	0.5	New	0	New
National Democratic Party		557	0.4	▼1.2	0	±0
Valid votes		136,899	98.7			
Invalid votes		1,742	1.3			
Total		138,641	100.0		55	±0
Electorate/voter turnout		210,618	65.8	▲6.8		
Source: Elections Berlin

=== District government ===
The district mayor (Bezirksbürgermeister) is elected by the Bezirksverordnetenversammlung, and positions in the district government (Bezirksamt) are apportioned based on party strength. Gordon Lemm of the SPD was elected mayor on 4 November 2021. Since the 2021 municipal elections, the composition of the district government is as follows:

Councillor	Party	Portfolio
Gordon Lemm	SPD	District Mayor; Civil Service, Finance, Staff, Economic Development and Planning
Nadja Zivkovic	CDU	Deputy Mayor; Social Affairs
Juliane Witt	LINKE	Urban Development, Roads, Green Spaces and Environment
Nicole Bienge	SPD	Youth and Health
Torsten Kühne	CDU	Education, Sport, Culture and Logistics
Vacant	AfD	Public Order
Source: Berlin.de

== Twin towns – sister cities ==
Marzahn-Hellersdorf is twinned with:

- Budapest XV (Budapest), Hungary (1991)
- Halton, England, United Kingdom (1994)
- Hoàng Mai (Hanoi), Vietnam (2013)
- Kastrychnitski (Minsk), Belarus (1993)
- Lauingen, Germany (1999)
- Tychy, Poland (1992)

== See also ==
- Berlin-Marzahn-Hellersdorf (electoral district)
