= Hönow station =

Station of the Berlin U-Bahn

Hönow
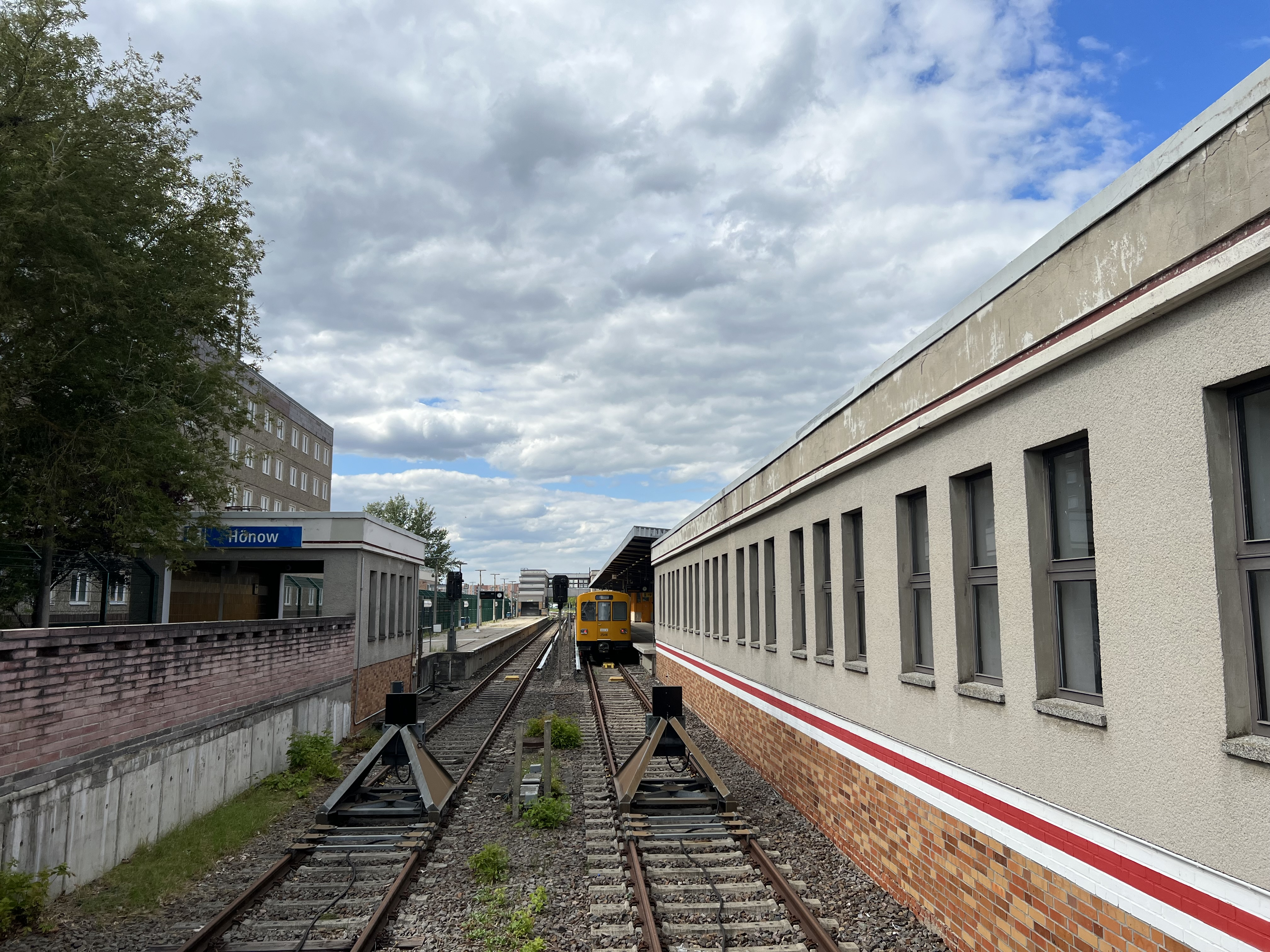

General information
- Other names: Berlin-Hönow
- Location: Böhlener Straße, Hellersdorf; Marzahn-Hellersdorf (Berlin) / Hönow; Germany
- Coordinates: 52°32′18″N 13°38′02″E
- System: Bf
- Operator: Berliner Verkehrsbetriebe
- Line: U5
- Platforms: 1 island platform 1 side platform
- Tracks: 3
- Connections: 395 941 943

Construction
- Structure type: At grade

Other information
- Fare zone: VBB: Berlin B/5656

History
- Opened: 1 July 1989; 37 years ago

Services
Preceding station	Berlin U-Bahn	Following station
Louis-Lewin-Strasse towards Berlin Hbf	U5	Terminus
Location
- Location within Berlin

Hönow is a Berlin U-Bahn station and the eastern terminus of the U5 line. Located at the borders of the Berliner ward of Hellersdorf, the station borders Hönow, a village of the Hoppegarten municipality in the state of Brandenburg.

== History ==
The station opened with the last extension of the U5 on 1 July 1989. The station was in Hönow, and the area around the station was incorporated into Berlin during German reunification on 3 October 1990.

== Gallery ==
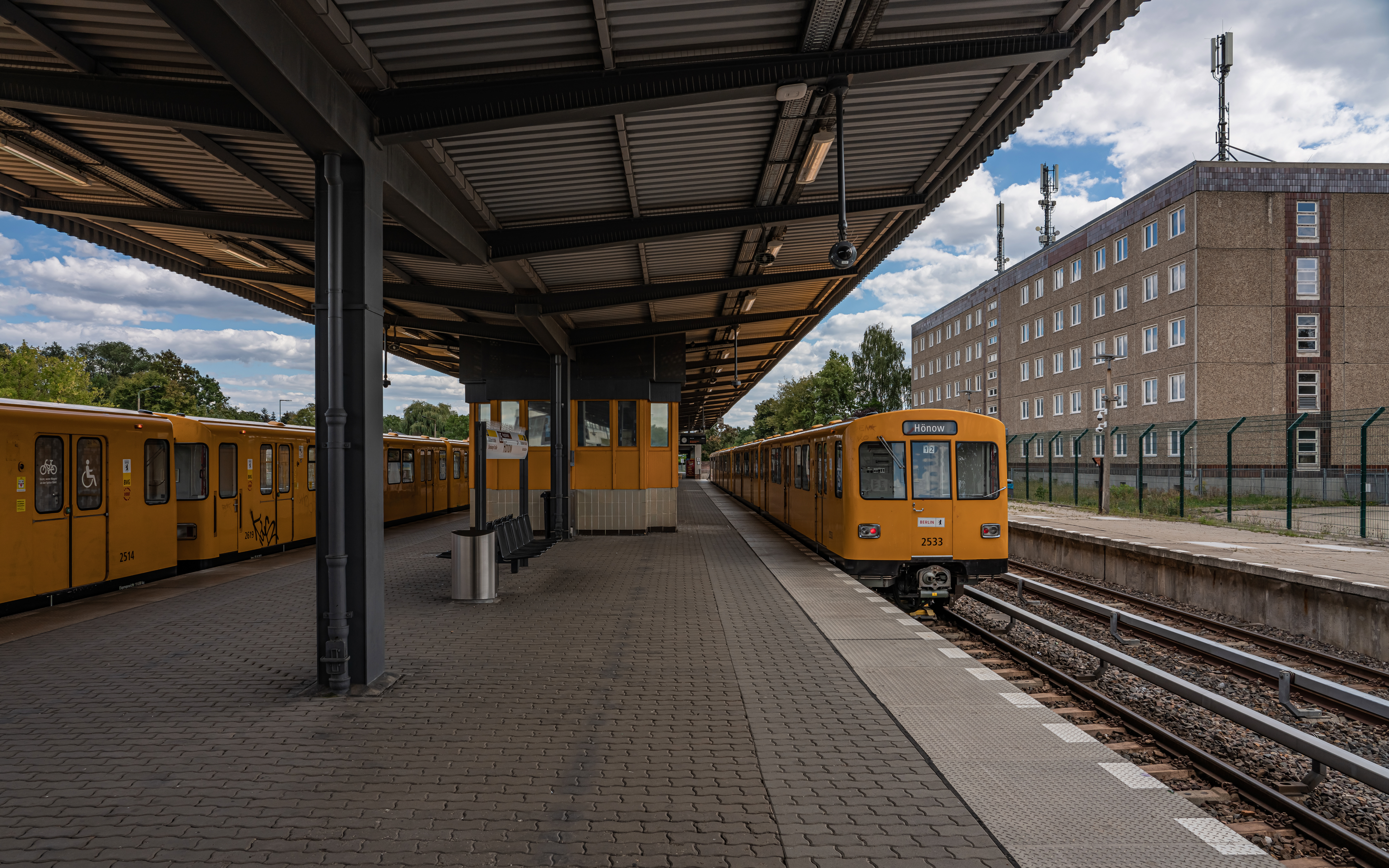
Platform view

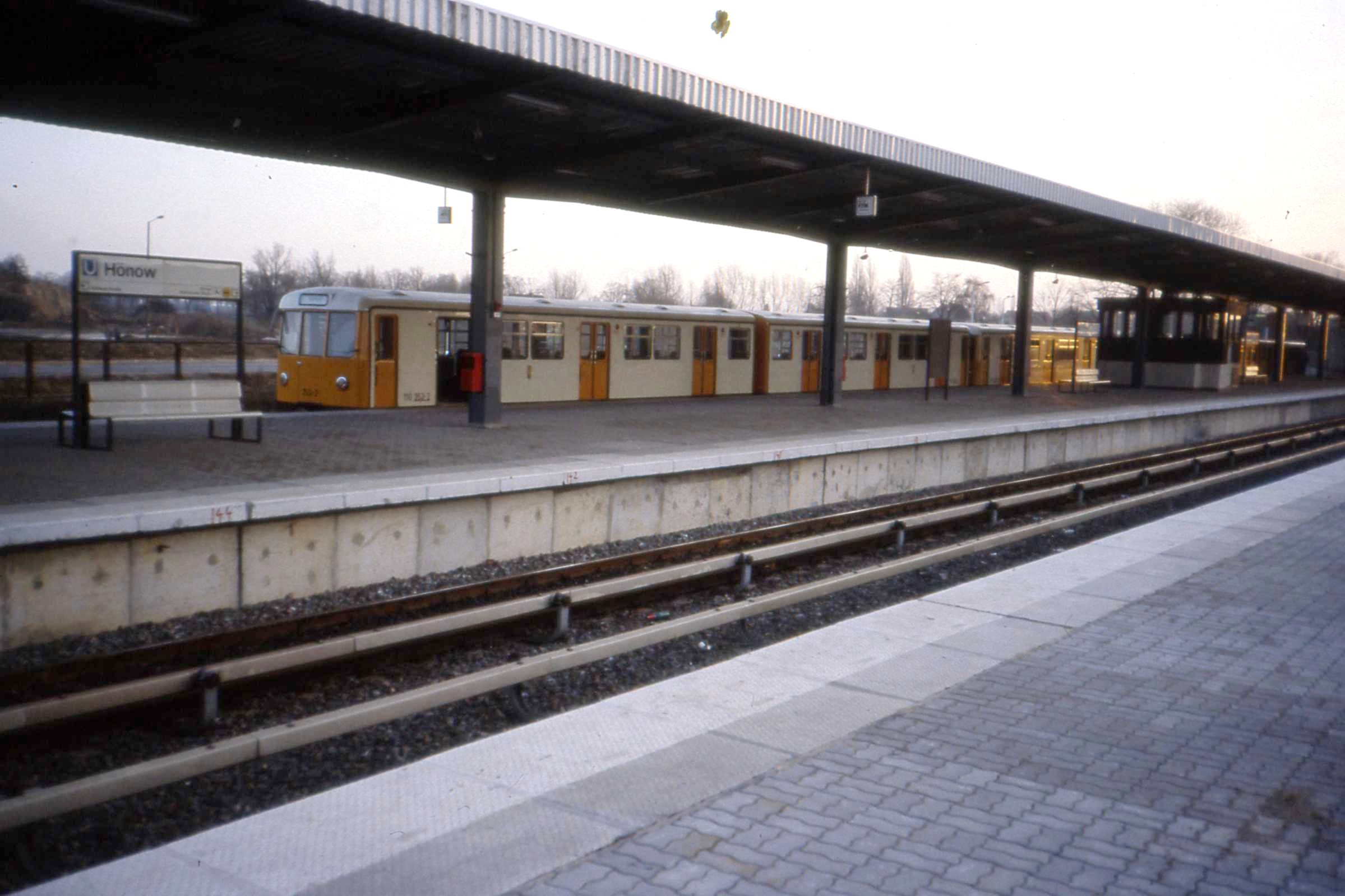
The station in January 1990
