= Geography of Berlin =

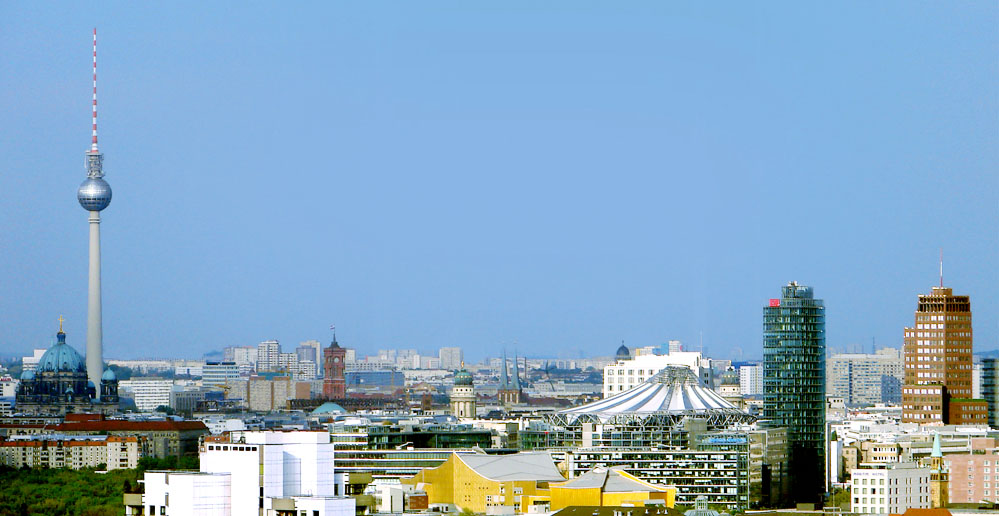
Berlin skyline with Berliner Fernsehturm (left) and skyscrapers of Potsdamer Platz (right)

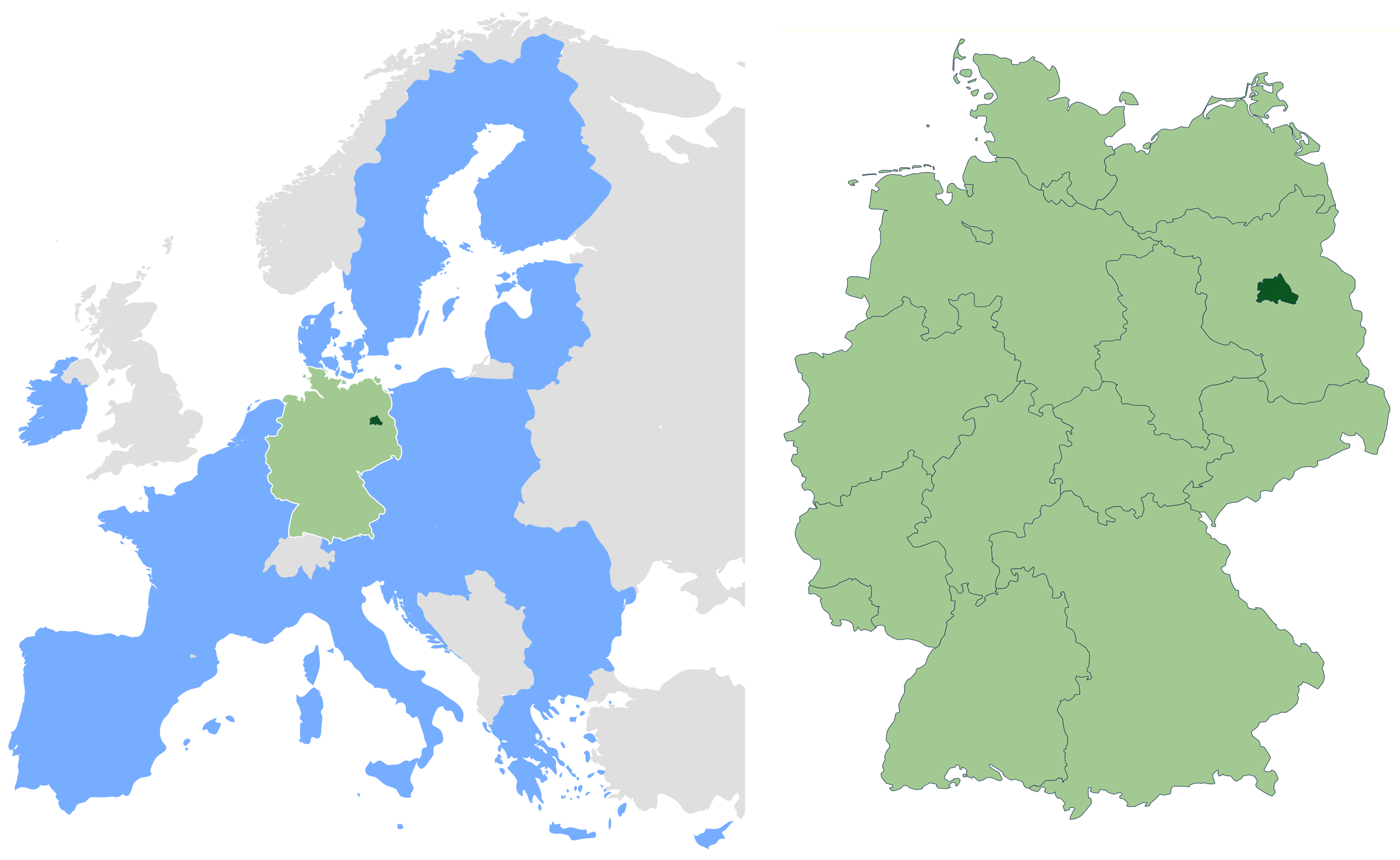
Location of Berlin in the European Union and Germany

Berlin is the capital city of Germany and one of the 16 states of Germany. With a population of 3.4 million people, Berlin is the most populous city proper, the sixth most populous urban area in the European Union, and the largest German city.

Located in northeastern Germany on the River Spree, it is the center of the Berlin-Brandenburg Metropolitan Region, which has about 6 million residents from over 180 nations. Its elevation is about 32 m above sea level.

Due to its location in the European Plain, Berlin is influenced by a temperate seasonal climate. Around one third of the city's area is composed of forests, parks, gardens, rivers and lakes. Berlin is surrounded by the state of Brandenburg.

== Topography ==
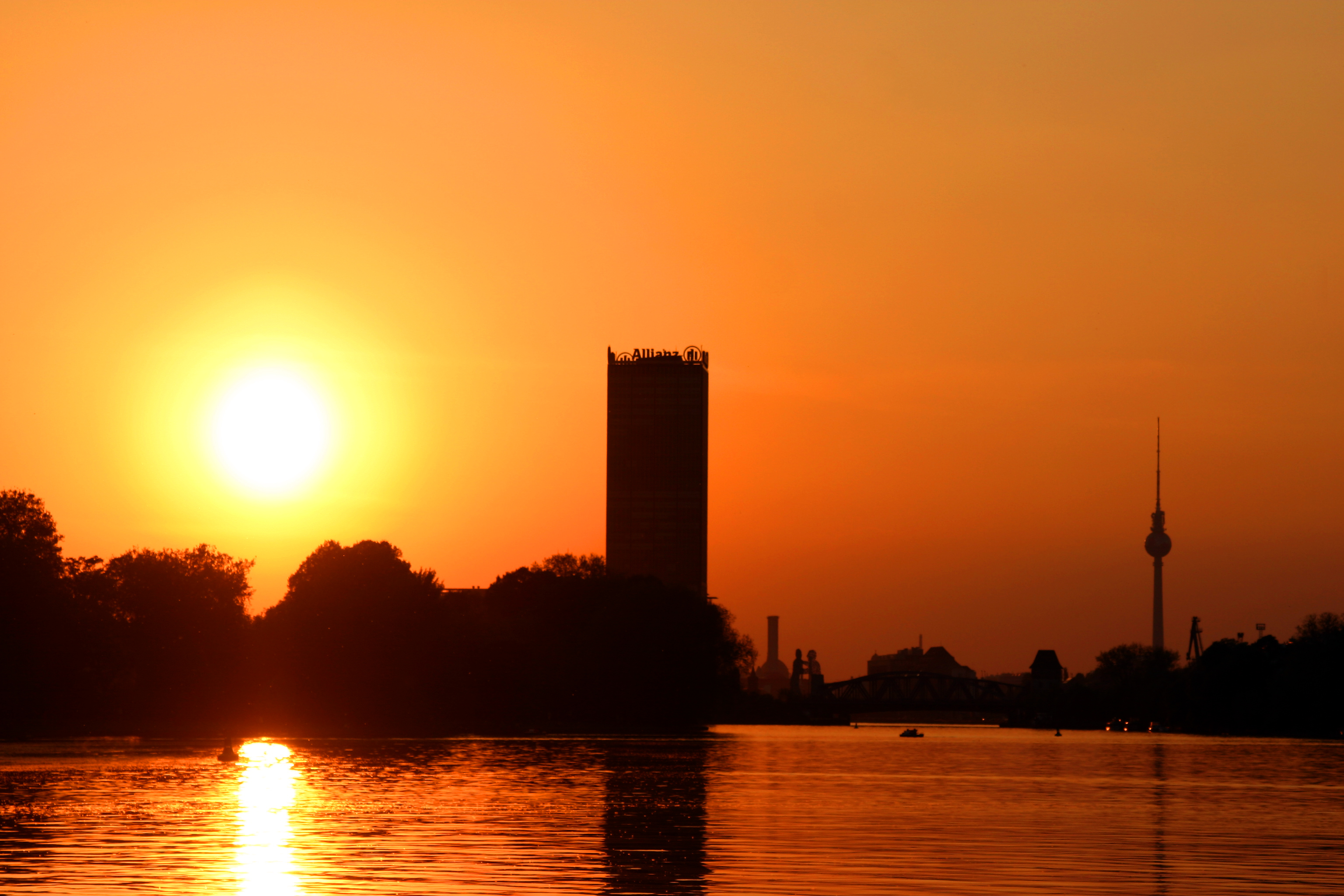
Treptowers and Berliner Fernsehturm at the river Spree

Berlin is located in northeastern Germany in an area of low-lying marshy woodlands with a mainly flat topography. It is part of the vast Northern European Plain that stretches from northern France to western Netherland

. The Berlin–Warsaw Urstromtal (ice age glacial valley), between the low Barnim Plateau to the north and the Teltow Plateau to the south, was formed by meltwater flowing from ice sheets at the end of the last Weichselian glaciation. The Spree follows this valley now. In Spandau, Berlin's westernmost borough, the Spree empties into the river Havel, which flows from north to south through western Berlin. The course of the Havel is more like a chain of lakes, the largest being the Tegeler See and Großer (Grosser) Wannsee. A series of lakes also feeds into the upper Spree, which flows through the Großer (Grosser) Müggelsee in eastern Berlin.

Substantial parts of present-day Berlin extend onto the low plateaus on both sides of the Spree Valley. Large parts of the boroughs, Reinickendorf and Pankow lie on the Barnim Plateau, while most of the boroughs—Charlottenburg-Wilmersdorf, Steglitz-Zehlendorf, Tempelhof-Schöneberg, and Neukölln—lie on the Teltow Plateau.

The borough of Spandau lies partly within the Berlin Glacial Valley and partly on the Nauen Plain, which stretches to the west of Berlin. The highest elevations in Berlin are the Teufelsberg and the Müggelberge in the city's outskirts, and the Kreuzberg is the highest elevation in the centre. While the latter measures 66 m (217 ft) above sea level, the former are both about 115 m (377 ft) above sea level. The Teufelsberg is actually an artificial hill composed of a pile of rubble from the ruins of World War II.

== Boroughs ==
The current 12 Berlin boroughs, as listed below.

Borough	Population 31 March 2010	Area in km²	Density per km²	Map
Charlottenburg-Wilmersdorf	319,628	64.72	4,878	The 12 Bezirke of Berlin
Friedrichshain-Kreuzberg	268,225	20.16	13,187	The 12 Bezirke of Berlin
Lichtenberg	259,881	52.29	4,952	The 12 Bezirke of Berlin
Marzahn-Hellersdorf	248,264	61.74	4,046	The 12 Bezirke of Berlin
Mitte	332,919	39.47	8,272	The 12 Bezirke of Berlin
Neukölln	310,283	44.93	6,804	The 12 Bezirke of Berlin
Pankow	366,441	103.01	3,476	The 12 Bezirke of Berlin
Reinickendorf	240,454	89.46	2,712	The 12 Bezirke of Berlin
Spandau	223,962	91.91	2,441	The 12 Bezirke of Berlin
Steglitz-Zehlendorf	293,989	102.50	2,818	The 12 Bezirke of Berlin
Tempelhof-Schöneberg	335,060	53.09	6,256	The 12 Bezirke of Berlin
Treptow-Köpenick	241,335	168.42	1,406	The 12 Bezirke of Berlin

== Climate ==
Berlin

Climate chart (precipitation, max. and min. temperature)
J	F	M	A	M	J	J	A	S	O	N	D
42 3 −2	33 4 −2	41 9 1	37 13 4	54 19 9	69 22 12	56 24 14	58 24 14	45 19 11	37 13 6	44 7 2	55 4 0
- █ Average max. and min. temperatures in °C
- █ Precipitation totals in mm
- Source: DWD, Data: 1971–2000
Imperial conversion
J	F	M	A	M	J	J	A	S	O	N	D
1.7 37 29	1.3 40 29	1.6 47 34	1.5 56 40	2.1 66 48	2.7 71 54	2.2 75 58	2.3 74 57	1.8 66 51	1.5 56 44	1.7 45 36	2.2 40 31
- █ Average max. and min. temperatures in °F
- █ Precipitation totals in inches

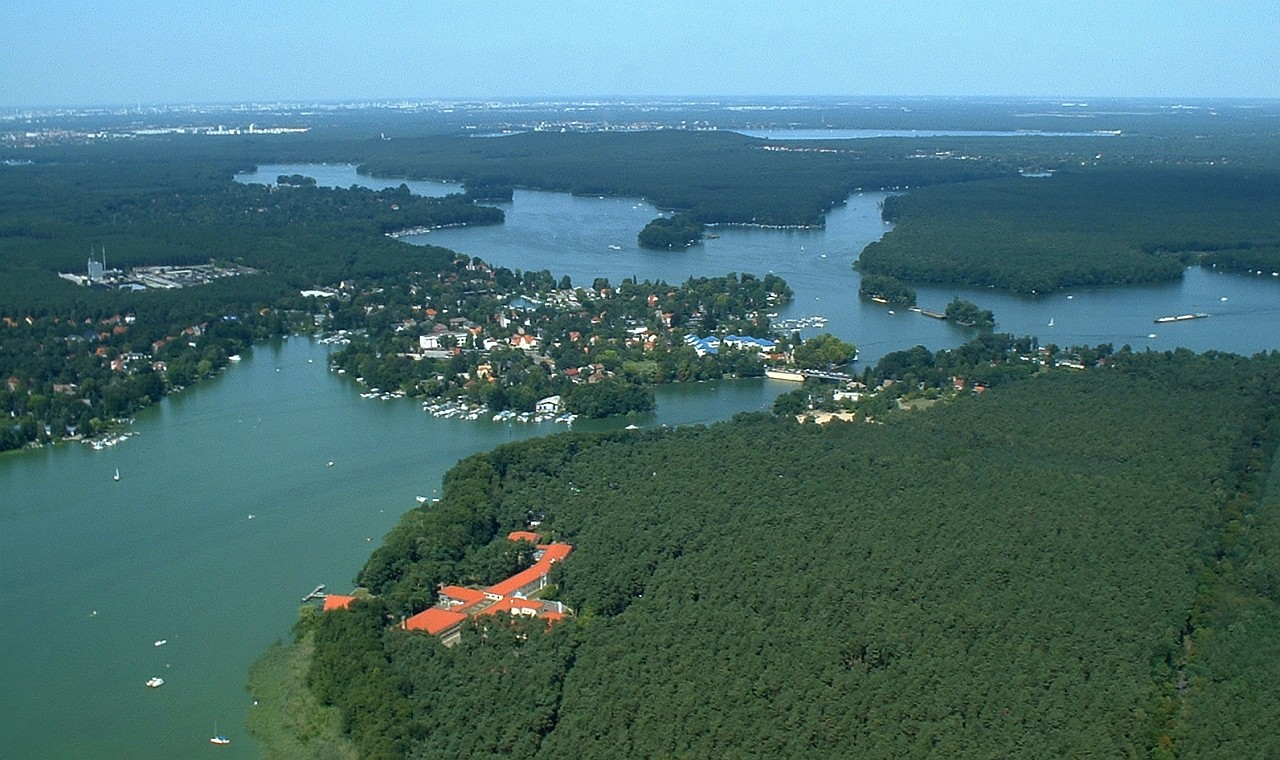
The outskirts of Berlin are covered with woodlands and numerous lakes.

Berlin's climate is "Oceanic", according to the Köppen climate classification system.

Summers are warm and sometimes humid, with average high temperatures of 22–25 °C (72–77 °F) and lows of 12–14 °C (54–57 °F). Winters are relatively cold, with average high temperatures of 3 °C (37 °F) and lows of −2 to 0 °C (28 to 32 °F). Spring and autumn are generally chilly to mild. Berlin's built-up area creates a microclimate, with heat stored by the city's buildings. Temperatures can be 4 °C (7 °F) higher in the city than in the surrounding areas.

Annual precipitation is 570 millimeters (22 in), with moderate rainfall throughout the year. Light snowfall mainly occurs from December through to March, but snow cover does not usually remain for long. The recent winter of 2009/2010 was an exception, as there was a permanent snow cover from late December until early March.

Climate data for Berlin (Tempelhof), elevation: 48 m, 1971–2000 normals
Month	Jan	Feb	Mar	Apr	May	Jun	Jul	Aug	Sep	Oct	Nov	Dec	Year
Mean daily maximum °C (°F)	3.3 (37.9)	5.0 (41.0)	9.0 (48.2)	15.0 (59.0)	19.6 (67.3)	22.3 (72.1)	25.0 (77.0)	24.5 (76.1)	19.3 (66.7)	13.9 (57.0)	7.7 (45.9)	3.7 (38.7)	14.0 (57.2)
Daily mean °C (°F)	0.6 (33.1)	1.4 (34.5)	4.8 (40.6)	8.9 (48.0)	14.3 (57.7)	17.1 (62.8)	19.2 (66.6)	18.9 (66.0)	14.5 (58.1)	9.7 (49.5)	4.7 (40.5)	2.0 (35.6)	9.7 (49.4)
Mean daily minimum °C (°F)	−1.9 (28.6)	−1.5 (29.3)	1.3 (34.3)	4.2 (39.6)	9.0 (48.2)	12.3 (54.1)	14.3 (57.7)	14.1 (57.4)	10.6 (51.1)	6.4 (43.5)	2.2 (36.0)	−0.4 (31.3)	5.9 (42.6)
Average rainfall mm (inches)	42.3 (1.67)	33.3 (1.31)	40.5 (1.59)	37.1 (1.46)	53.8 (2.12)	68.7 (2.70)	55.5 (2.19)	58.2 (2.29)	45.1 (1.78)	37.3 (1.47)	43.6 (1.72)	55.3 (2.18)	570.7 (22.48)
Average rainy days (≥ 1.0 mm)	10.0	8.0	9.1	7.8	8.9	7.0	7.0	7.0	7.8	7.6	9.6	11.4	101.2
Source: WMO

Climate data for Berlin (Dahlem), elevation: 58 m, extremes 1908-present
Month	Jan	Feb	Mar	Apr	May	Jun	Jul	Aug	Sep	Oct	Nov	Dec	Year
Record high °C (°F)	15.2 (59.4)	18.6 (65.5)	25.1 (77.2)	30.9 (87.6)	33.3 (91.9)	36.1 (97.0)	37.9 (100.2)	37.7 (99.9)	34.2 (93.6)	27.5 (81.5)	19.5 (67.1)	15.7 (60.3)	37.9 (100.2)
Record low °C (°F)	−21.0 (−5.8)	−26.0 (−14.8)	−16.5 (2.3)	−6.7 (19.9)	−2.9 (26.8)	0.8 (33.4)	5.4 (41.7)	4.7 (40.5)	−0.5 (31.1)	−9.6 (14.7)	−16.1 (3.0)	−20.2 (−4.4)	−26.0 (−14.8)
Source: Berliner Extremwerte

Climate data for Berlin (Dahlem), elevation: 58 m, 1961-1990 normals and extremes (Note: Because the location of the weather station is furthest from the more densely urbanized region of Berlin and further away from the main UHI, its values will be somewhat higher, especially in the center and immediate regions.)
Month	Jan	Feb	Mar	Apr	May	Jun	Jul	Aug	Sep	Oct	Nov	Dec	Year
Record high °C (°F)	14.0 (57.2)	18.6 (65.5)	25.1 (77.2)	30.9 (87.6)	32.0 (89.6)	33.7 (92.7)	35.2 (95.4)	35.4 (95.7)	30.5 (86.9)	27.5 (81.5)	19.5 (67.1)	15.7 (60.3)	35.4 (95.7)
Mean daily maximum °C (°F)	1.8 (35.2)	3.5 (38.3)	7.9 (46.2)	13.1 (55.6)	18.6 (65.5)	21.8 (71.2)	23.1 (73.6)	22.8 (73.0)	18.7 (65.7)	13.3 (55.9)	7.0 (44.6)	3.2 (37.8)	12.9 (55.2)
Daily mean °C (°F)	−0.4 (31.3)	0.6 (33.1)	4.0 (39.2)	8.4 (47.1)	13.5 (56.3)	16.7 (62.1)	17.9 (64.2)	17.2 (63.0)	13.5 (56.3)	9.3 (48.7)	4.6 (40.3)	1.2 (34.2)	8.9 (48.0)
Mean daily minimum °C (°F)	−2.9 (26.8)	−2.2 (28.0)	0.5 (32.9)	3.9 (39.0)	8.2 (46.8)	11.4 (52.5)	12.9 (55.2)	12.4 (54.3)	9.4 (48.9)	5.9 (42.6)	2.1 (35.8)	−1.1 (30.0)	5.0 (41.1)
Record low °C (°F)	−20.3 (−4.5)	−17.0 (1.4)	−14.0 (6.8)	−5.5 (22.1)	−2.0 (28.4)	0.8 (33.4)	5.5 (41.9)	4.7 (40.5)	0.6 (33.1)	−2.9 (26.8)	−16.1 (3.0)	−20.2 (−4.4)	−20.3 (−4.5)
Average precipitation mm (inches)	43.0 (1.69)	37.0 (1.46)	38.0 (1.50)	42.0 (1.65)	55.0 (2.17)	71.0 (2.80)	53.0 (2.09)	65.0 (2.56)	46.0 (1.81)	36.0 (1.42)	50.0 (1.97)	55.0 (2.17)	591 (23.29)
Average precipitation days (≥ 1.0 mm)	10.0	9.0	8.0	9.0	10.0	10.0	9.0	9.0	9.0	8.0	10.0	11.0	112
Mean monthly sunshine hours	45.4	72.3	122.0	157.7	221.6	220.9	217.9	210.2	156.3	110.9	52.4	37.4	1,625
Source: NOAA

== Cityscape ==
Berlin's history has left the city with a highly eclectic array of architecture and buildings. The city's appearance today is predominantly shaped by its key position in Germany's history during the 20th century. Each of the national governments based in Berlin—the 1871 German Empire, the Weimar Republic, Nazi Germany, East Germany, and now the reunified Germany—initiated ambitious (re-) construction programs, with each adding its own distinctive style to the city's architecture.

Berlin was devastated by bombing raids during World War II, and many of the buildings that had remained after the war were demolished in the 1950s and 1960s, in both West and East Berlin. Much of this demolition was initiated by municipal architecture programs to build new residential or business quarters and main roads.

The eastern parts of Berlin have many Plattenbauten, reminders of Eastern Bloc ambitions to create complete residential areas consisting of fixed ratios of shops, kindergartens, and schools to the number of residents.

Clusters of towers rise at various locations: Potsdamer Platz, the City West, and Alexanderplatz, the latter two delineating the former centers of East and West Berlin, with the first representing a new Berlin of the 21st century, risen from the wastes of no-man's land of the Berlin Wall. Berlin has three of the top 40 tallest buildings in Germany.

Over one-third of the city area consists of green space, woodlands and water. Berlin's second largest and most popular park, the Großer Tiergarten, is located right in the center of the city. It covers an area of 210 hectares and stretches from Bahnhof Zoo in the City West to the Brandenburg Gate in the east.

== Architecture ==
Governmental building

The Fernsehturm (TV tower) at Alexanderplatz in Mitte is among the tallest structures in the European Union at 368 meters (1,207 ft). Built in 1969, it is visible throughout most of the central districts of Berlin. The city can be viewed from its 204 m (669 ft)-high observation floor. Starting here, the Karl-Marx-Allee heads east, an avenue lined by monumental residential buildings, designed in the Socialist Classicism style of the Joseph Stalin era. Adjacent to this area is the Rotes Rathaus ("City Hall"), with its distinctive red-brick architecture. In front of the Rotes Rathaus is the Neptunbrunnen, a fountain featuring a mythological group of Tritons, personifications of the four main Prussian rivers, with Neptune situated on top of it.

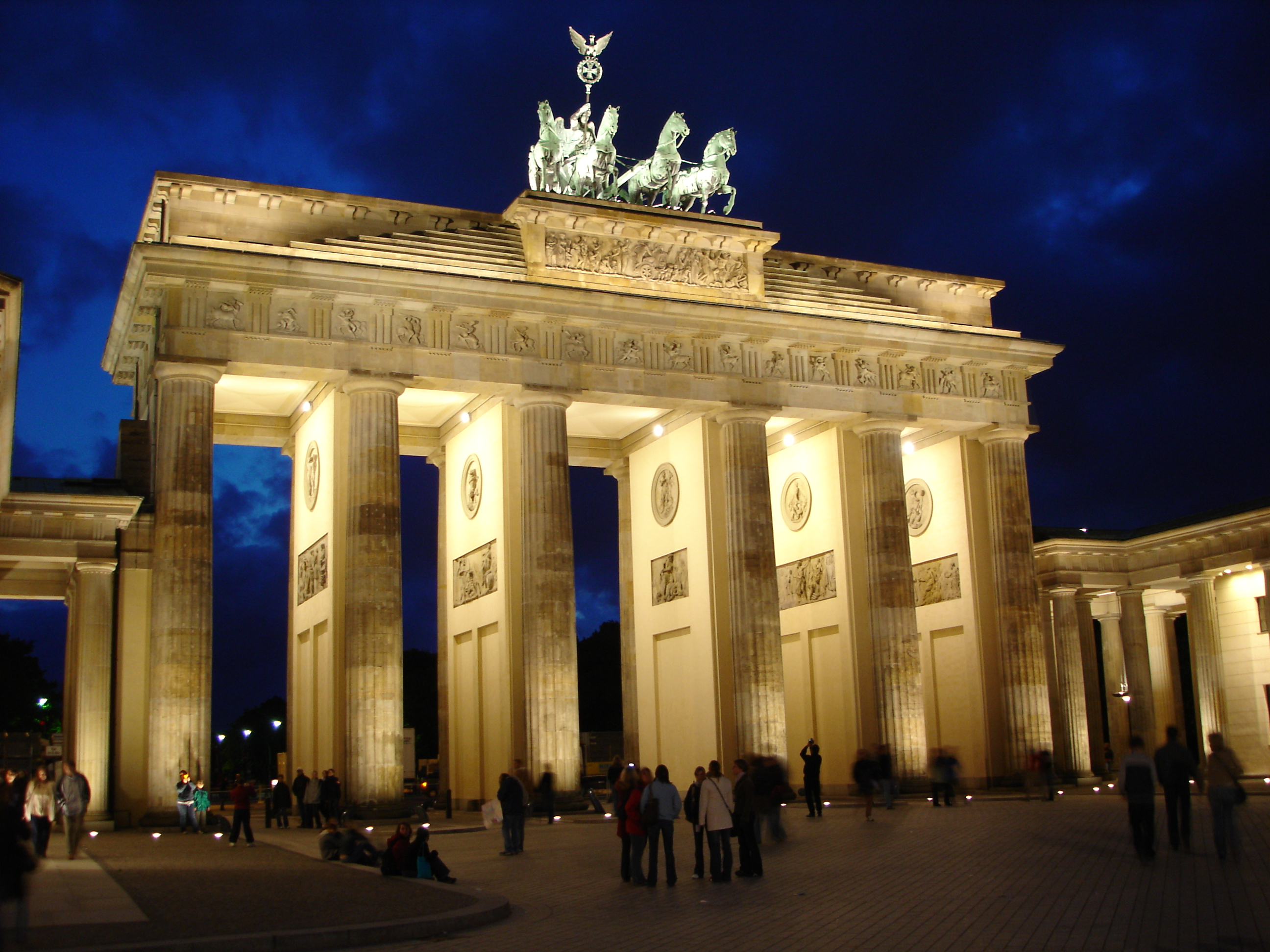
The Brandenburg Gate

The East Side Gallery is an open-air exhibition of art painted directly on the last existing portions of the Berlin Wall. It is the largest remaining evidence of the city's historical division and the inauguration of its restoration occurred in November 2009; the restoration project cost the Berlin city government more than €2 million.

Berlin's Brandenburg Gate is an iconic landmark of Germany and appears on Germany's euro coins (10 cent, 20 cent, and 50 cent). The Reichstag building is the traditional seat of the German Parliament, renovated in the 1950s after severe damage sustained during World War II. The building was again remodeled by British architect, Sir Norman Foster, in 1999, and features a glass dome over the session area, which allows free public access to the parliamentary proceedings and magnificent views of the city.

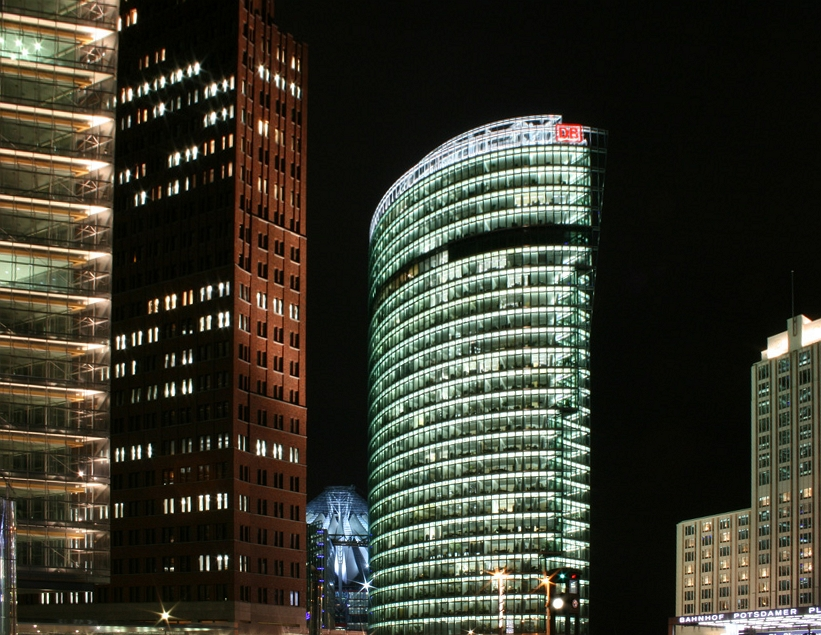
Potsdamer Platz at night

The Gendarmenmarkt, a neoclassical square in Berlin whose name dates back to the quarters of the famous Gens d'armes regiment located here in the 18th century, is bordered by two similarly designed cathedrals, the Französischer Dom with its observation platform and the Deutscher Dom. The Konzerthaus (Concert Hall), home of the Berlin Symphony Orchestra, stands between the two cathedrals.

The Museum Island, in the River Spree, houses five museums, built between 1830 and 1930, and is a UNESCO World Heritage site. Restoration and the construction of a main entrance to all museums, as well as the reconstruction of the Stadtschloss on the same island is costing over 2 billion Euros since reunification. Also located on the island, and adjacent to the Lustgarten and palace, is Berlin Cathedral, emperor William II's ambitious attempt to create a Protestant counterpart to St. Peter's Basilica in Rome. A large crypt in the church houses the remains of some members of the earlier Prussian royal family and the church is now owned by the Protestant umbrella organization, Union of Evangelical Churches (UEK). Like many other buildings, the Berlin Cathedral suffered extensive damage during World War II and was later restored. Berlin's best preserved medieval church, the Church of St. Mary's, is the first preaching venue—Memorial Church being the second—of the Bishop of the Evangelical Church of Berlin-Brandenburg-Silesian Upper Lusatia (EKBO), a Protestant regional church body. St. Hedwig's Cathedral is Berlin's most prominent Roman Catholic cathedral.

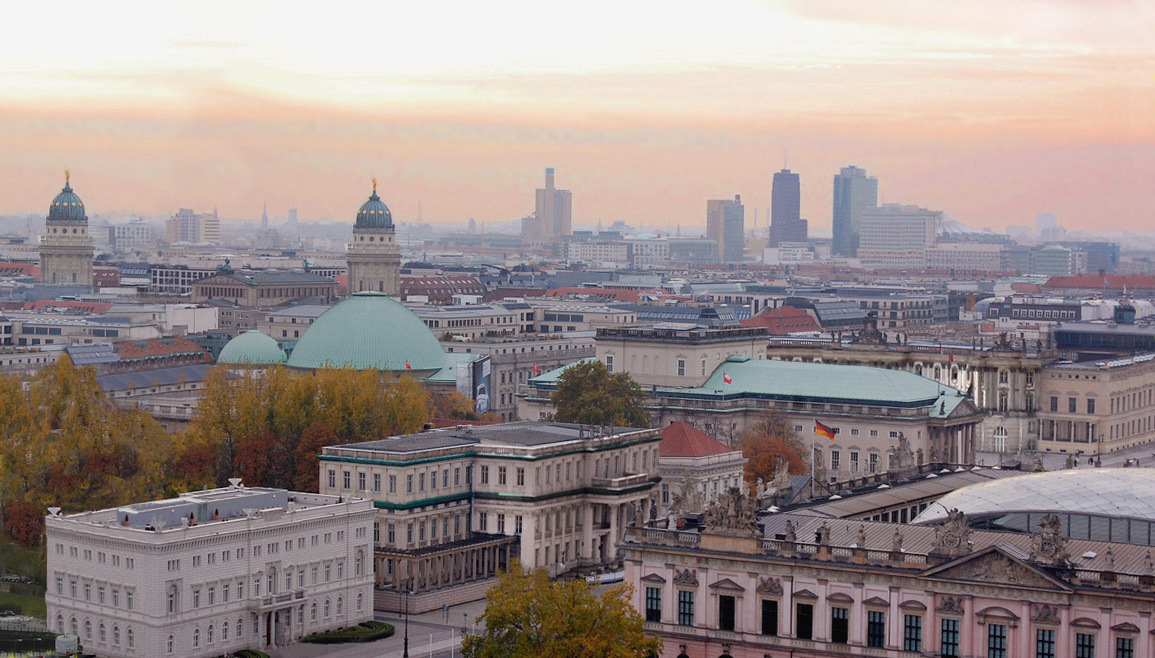
View over central Berlin. Unter den Linden in foreground and skyscrapers of Potsdamer Platz up to the right.

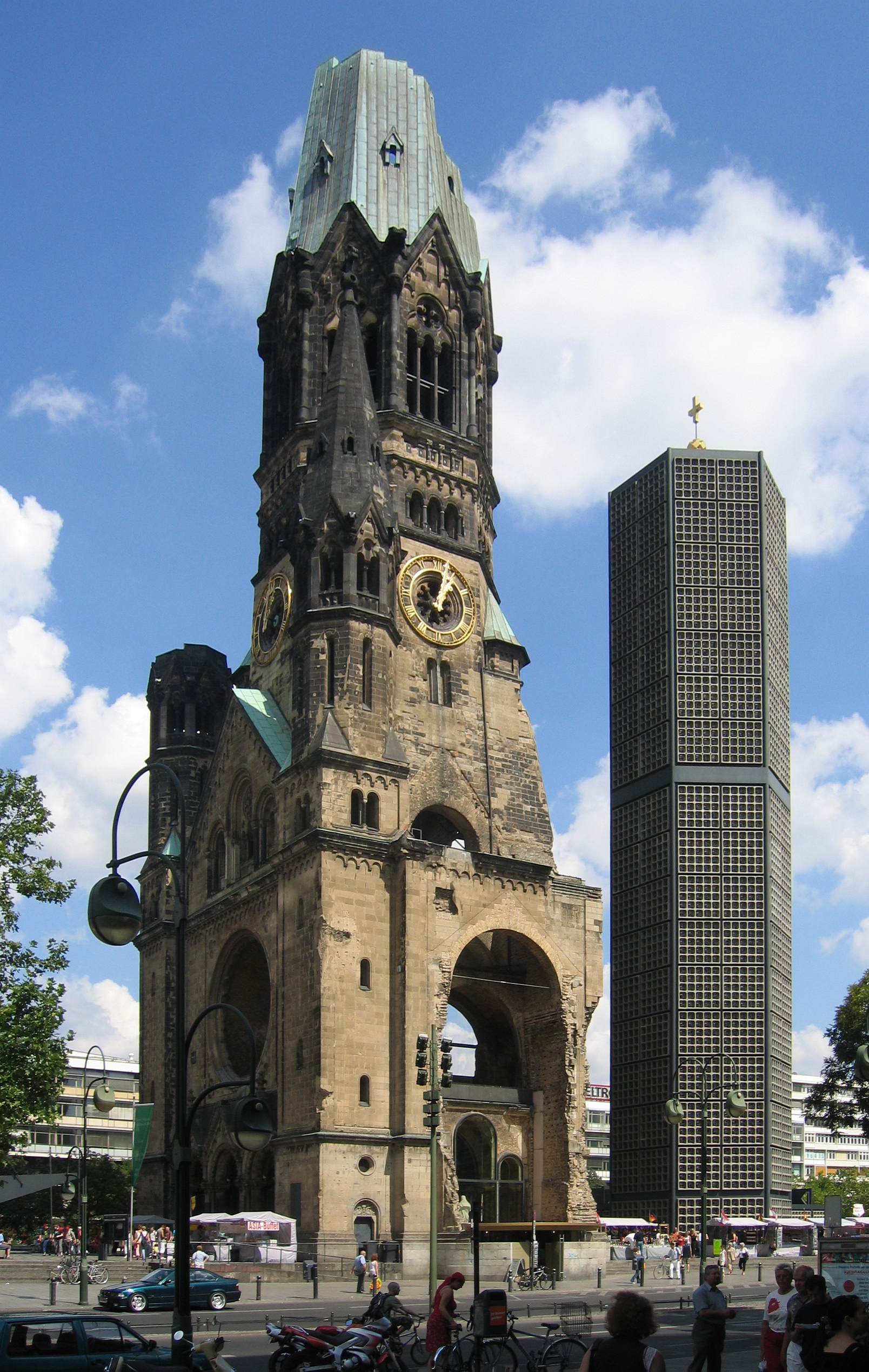
Kaiser Wilhelm Memorial Church is the 2nd preaching venue of the Bishop of the Regional Protestant Church (EKBO).

Unter den Linden is a tree-lined east–west avenue that extends from the Brandenburg Gate to the site of the former Berliner Stadtschloss, and was Berlin's premier promenade in the nineteenth century. Many classical buildings line the street and part of Humboldt University is located there. Friedrichstraße was Berlin's legendary street during the "Roaring Twenties" and today, it combines twentieth-century traditions with the modern architecture of contemporary Berlin. Places of significance in the area include the Admiralspalast, the Friedrichstadt Palast, and the Theater am Schiffbauerdamm, home to the Berliner Ensemble.

Potsdamer Platz is a quarter that was built in its entirety after the Berlin Wall was deconstructed in 1995. To the west of Potsdamer Platz is the Kulturforum, which houses the Gemäldegalerie, and is flanked by the Neue Nationalgalerie and the Berliner Philharmonie. The Memorial to the Murdered Jews of Europe, a Holocaust memorial, is situated to the north.

The Hackescher Markt was constructed as a joint endeavour between the Berlin City Commandant, Graf von Hacke, and Friedrich II. In 1840 it was officially renamed as Hackescher Markt. The area around Hackescher Markt is home to fashionable culture, with countless clothing outlets, the offices of international fashion labels, clubs, bars, and galleries. The Hackesche Höfe is also a part of the area and is a conglomeration of buildings that were reconstructed around 1996; the buildings now surround several courtyards. Oranienburger Straße and the nearby New Synagogue were the center of Jewish culture before 1933. Although the New Synagogue is still an anchor for Jewish history and culture, Oranienburger straße and surrounding areas have become increasingly known for pubs, shopping, theaters, art galleries, and nightlife.

Schloss Charlottenburg is the largest existing palace in Berlin.

The Straße des 17. Juni, connecting the Brandenburg Gate and Ernst-Reuter-Platz, serves as a central East-West axis. Situated in the western part of the city, its name commemorates the uprisings in East Berlin of June 17, 1953. Approximately half-way from the Brandenburg Gate is the Großer Stern, a circular traffic island on which the Siegessäule ("Victory Column") is situated. This monument, built to commemorate Prussia's victories, was relocated from its previous position in front of the Reichstag in 1938 by the Nazis.

The Kurfürstendamm is home to some of Berlin's luxury shops, restaurants, and cafes, with the Kaiser Wilhelm Memorial Church at its eastern end on Breitscheidplatz (the church was destroyed in World War II and left in ruins, but was rebuilt between 1959 and 1963); theaters and concert halls, such as Philharmonie Berlin and Theater am Kurfürstendamm, are also located in the neighborhood. Nearby on Tauentzienstraße, is KaDeWe, continental Europe's largest department store. The Rathaus Schöneberg ("City Hall"), where John F. Kennedy made his famous "Ich bin ein Berliner!" speech, is situated in Tempelhof-Schöneberg.

West of the city center, Schloss Bellevue is the residence of the German President. Schloss Charlottenburg, which was severely damaged by fire during World War II, and largely destroyed, has been rebuilt and is the largest surviving historical palace in Berlin.

The Funkturm Berlin is a 150 m (490 ft)-tall lattice radio tower, built between 1924 and 1926. The construction was designed by architect, Heinrich Straumer, and became operative at the 3rd IFA fair; several years after becoming operative, it was sending television images without sound. The tower hosts a restaurant 55 m (180 ft) and an observation deck 126 m (413 ft) above-ground, which is reachable by a glass elevator. On a clear day, the tower offers a comprehensive view of western Berlin.

== Tallest buildings ==
Rank	Name	Image	Height (m)	Year built
1	Berliner Fernsehturm		368	1965–1969
2	Berliner Funkturm		146.8	1924-1926
3	Park Inn Berlin		125	1967-1969
4	Treptowers		125	1995-1998
5	Steglitzer Kreisel		119	1968-1980
