= Berlin-Müggelberge TV Tower =

Incomplete tower in Berlin

Coordinates: 52°25′00″N 13°38′11″E

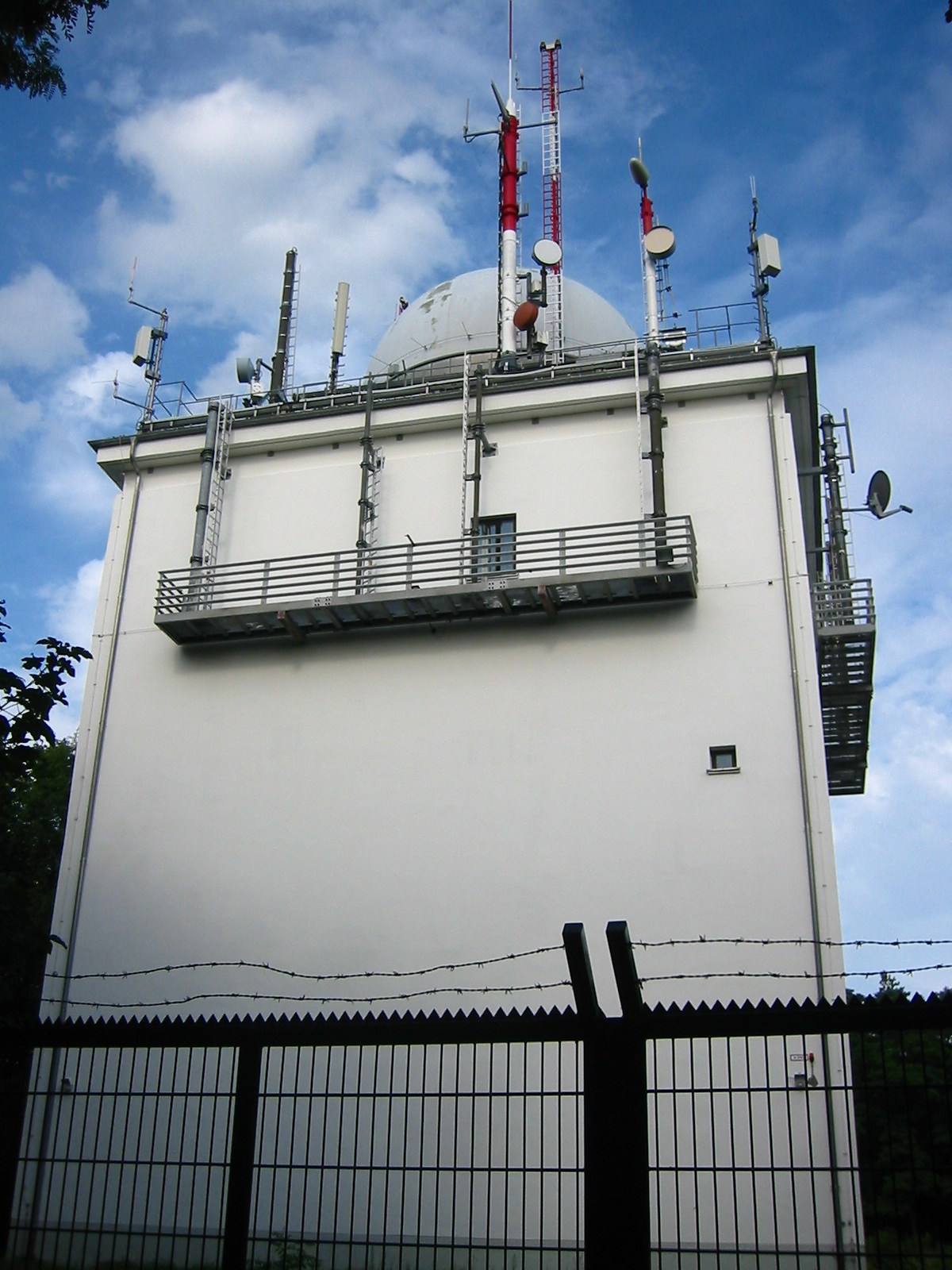
view from the gateway

The Berlin-Müggelberge TV tower is the 31-metre-tall (102 ft) base of a tower, never completed, in the Müggel hills of southeast Berlin, Germany. The tower base is currently used as radio relay link station.

The tower was originally planned as the TV tower for Berlin. It was to have a total height of 425 feet (130 meters) with an observation platform at 230 feet (70 meters).

After construction was started in 1954, a survey indicated that the tower would endanger aircraft on approach to the Berlin-Schoenefeld airport. For this reason, on 13 December 1955 construction was stopped.

The tower base was later used by the East German Ministry for State Security (Ministerium für Staatssicherheit or Stasi) as a listening post.

Today it serves the Deutsche Telekom AG as radio relay link station and has a radar dome on its top.

Close to the tower, there is a 64-metre-tall (210 ft) lattice tower with aerials for non-public mobile radio services and directional antennas.

The Berlin-Müggelberge TV tower is not accessible to the public and is not to be confused with the Berlin-Müggelberge look-out, known as the Müggelturm (Müggel tower), which is publicly accessible.

== See also ==
- A Tower
