= Barnim Plateau =

The Barnim Plateau is a plateau which is occupied by the northeastern parts of Berlin and the surrounding federal state of Brandenburg in Germany.

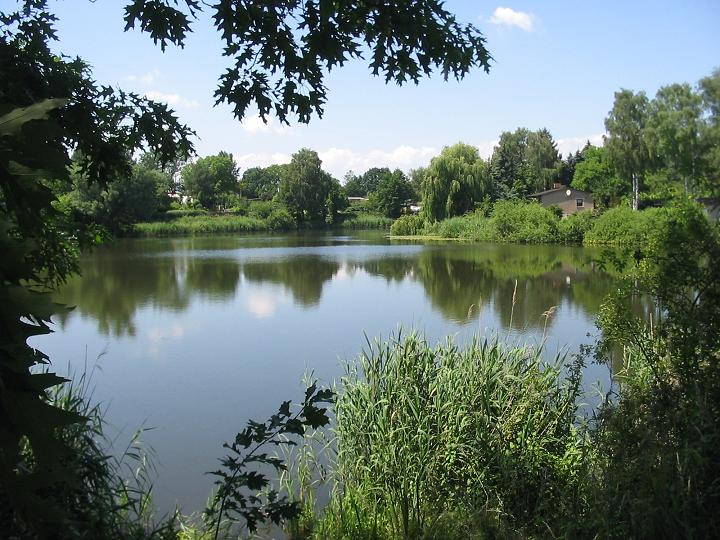
A lake known as Retsee which is located on the plateau.

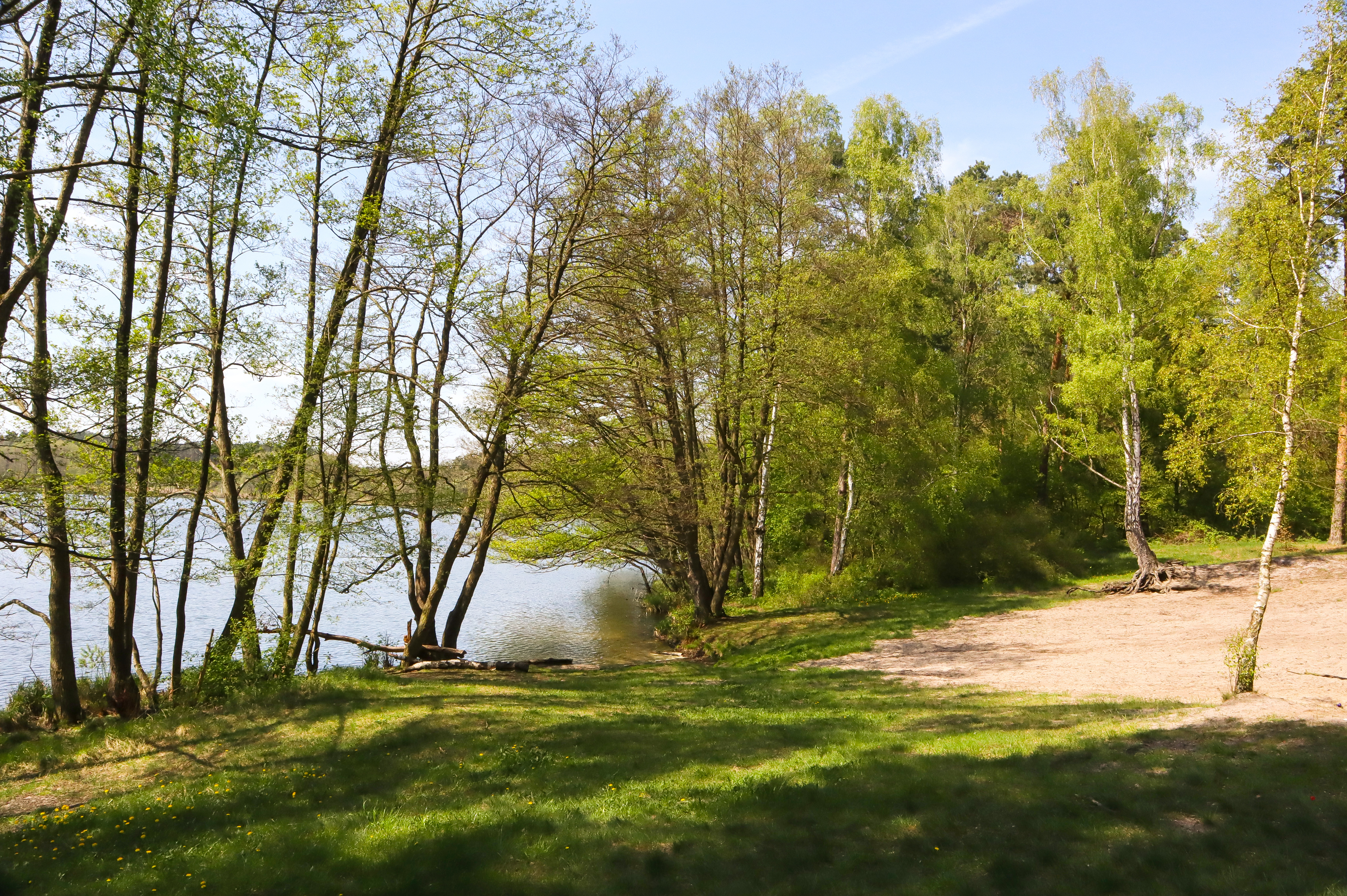
Lake Schwärzesee near Eberswalde, Barnim, Brandenburg

== Boundaries and Subdivision ==
=== Boundaries ===
The limits of the plateau are easily definable. The southern boundary is marked by the Berlin Valley, through which the River Spree flows. To the west, the boundary between Barnim and the Glien Plateau is marked by a north–south glacial valley. To the north and north east is the boundary with the Eberswald Valley, and in the east, Lubusz Land.

=== Subdivision ===
Traditionally the plateau is divided into the Upper and Lower Barnim, separated by a line running between Strausberg and Eberswalde. Typically, Lower Barnim does not reach higher than 80 metres above mean sea level (AMSL) whereas Upper Barnim is generally more than 100 metres AMSL. The highest point of the plateau is Semmelberg which stands at 157 metres AMSL.

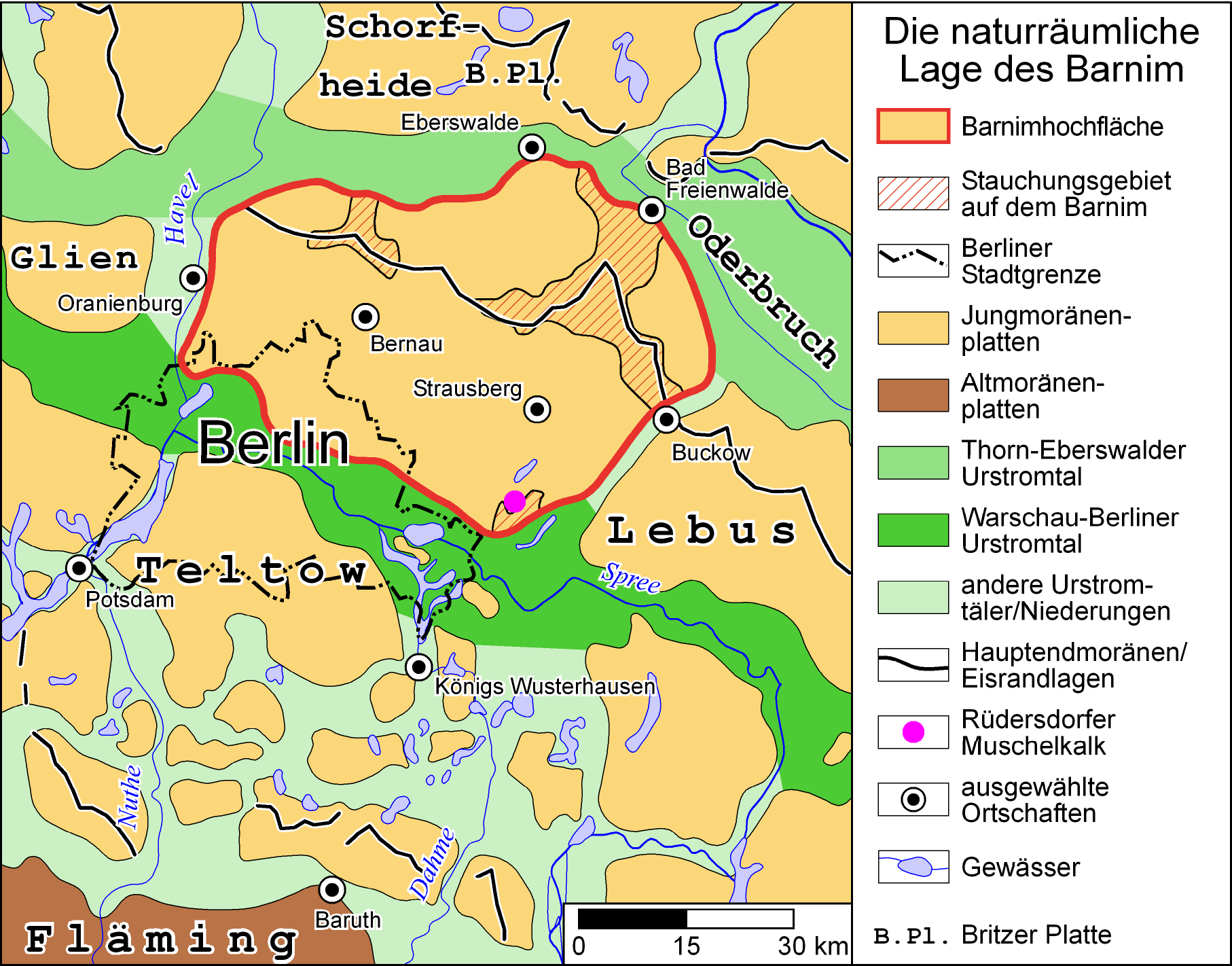
The extent of the Barnim Plateau.

=== Settlements ===
Until the growth of Berlin in the 19th century, Barnim was only sparsely populated; in the eastern portion this continues to be the case. Excluding Berlin, only Bernau and Strausberg are the only settlements with more than 10,000 inhabitants. Werneuchen, Altlandsberg and Biesenthal are among the smaller towns in the area. Several once-independent towns such as Oranienburg and Wriezen, which were once independent towns, were incorporated into Berlin as a result of urban sprawl in the late 19th and early 20th centuries.

== Geological Structure, Landforms and Soils ==
=== Bedrock Deposits ===
The southern edge of Barnim in the vicinity of Rüdersdorf unusually contains widespread deposits of limestone, Buntsandstein and Muschelkalk. The relatively high position of the limestone in the bedrock is explained by the presence of a salt dome; the migrating salt pushed the overlying sedimentary rock closer to the surface. The limestone deposits gave birth to an expansive quarry which provided building materials for the expanding Berlin, an example of which being the tower of St. Mary's Church.

=== Kansan Glacial Period ===
The deposits of the first glacial motions during the Kansan glaciation were laid as deep as 100 metres below the surface. They are particularly prominent in tunnel valleys. Kansan sediment primarily consists of till and deposits in proglacial lakes. Thanks to superposition with Wolstonian Stage sediment, it is generally only found at the surface in isolation around the Oderbruchrand area. Generally, present-day Barnim there is very little surface evidence of the Kansan period remaining.

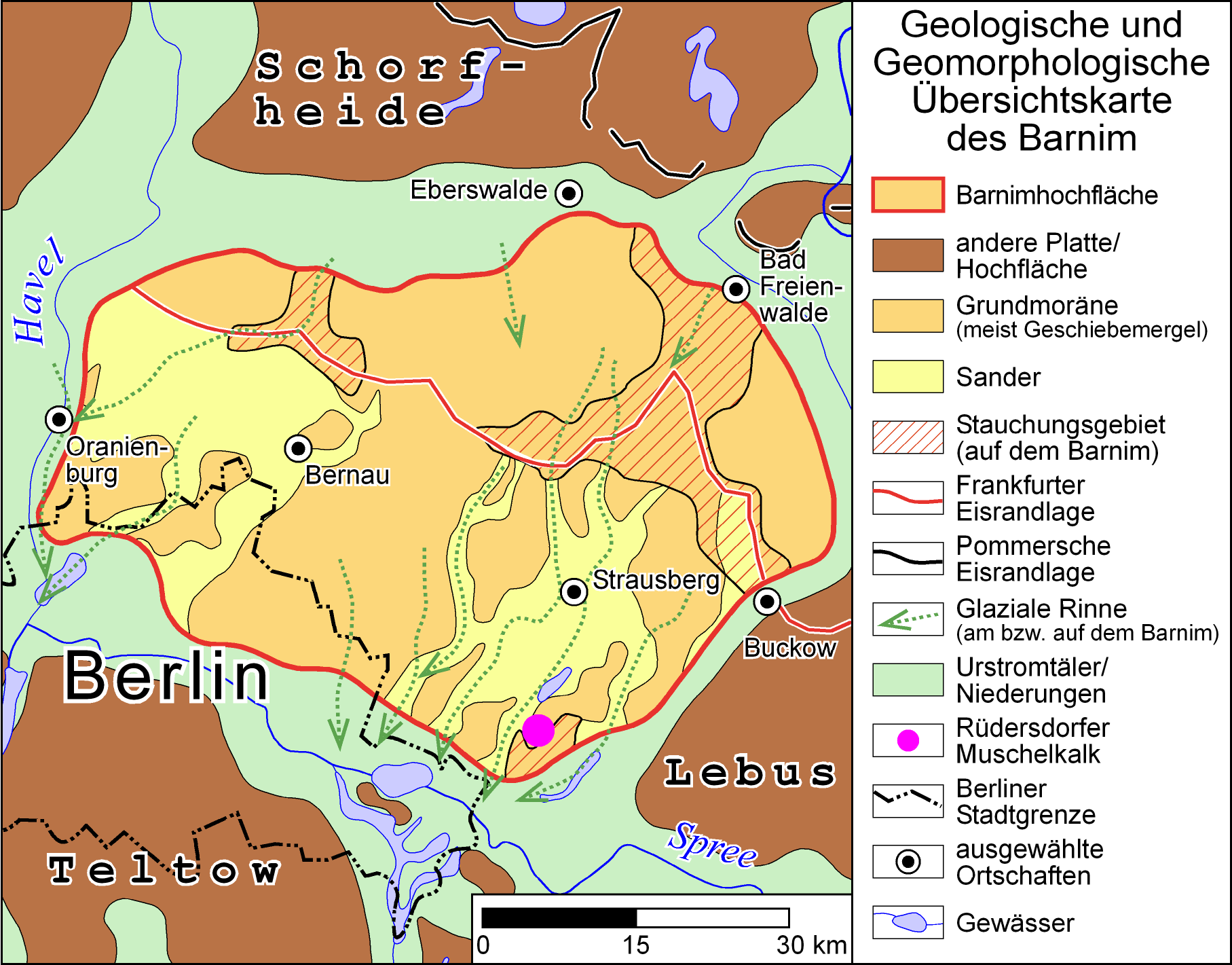
A geological and geomorphological map of Barnim

=== Wolstonian Stage ===
Only the two primary glacial motions of the Wolstonian Stage allowed the plateau to clearly emerge. Geologically, Barnim is composed mostly of deposits from the more recent Warthe Motion which extends as far as Fläming Heath. The till associated with the Wolstonian stage can be found on the surface or within a few metres of it in many places. The deposits of the older Drenthe Motion are much thinner and covered by deposits from younger movements.

The Wolstonian period also saw the formation of several terminal moraines; for this reason there are numerous places throughout the plateau where the soil consists of clay made of oligocene and miocene, which belong to the tertiary period which predates the Wolstonian Stage by several million years.

=== Last Glacial Period ===
In the last glacial period, more commonly known as the last time the Earth experienced an ice age, glaciers reached 60 kilometres south of Barnim.

== Hydrology and Climate ==
=== Hydrology ===
==== Watershed ====
The principal drainage divide between the North Sea and the Baltic Sea runs across the Barnim plateau from Northeast to Southwest. It also runs between the drainage basins of the Elbe and Oder rivers. Its course roughly follows that of the Frankfurt push moraine. The main features along the divide include the Wandlitzer See and the Liepnitzsee.

==== Streams ====
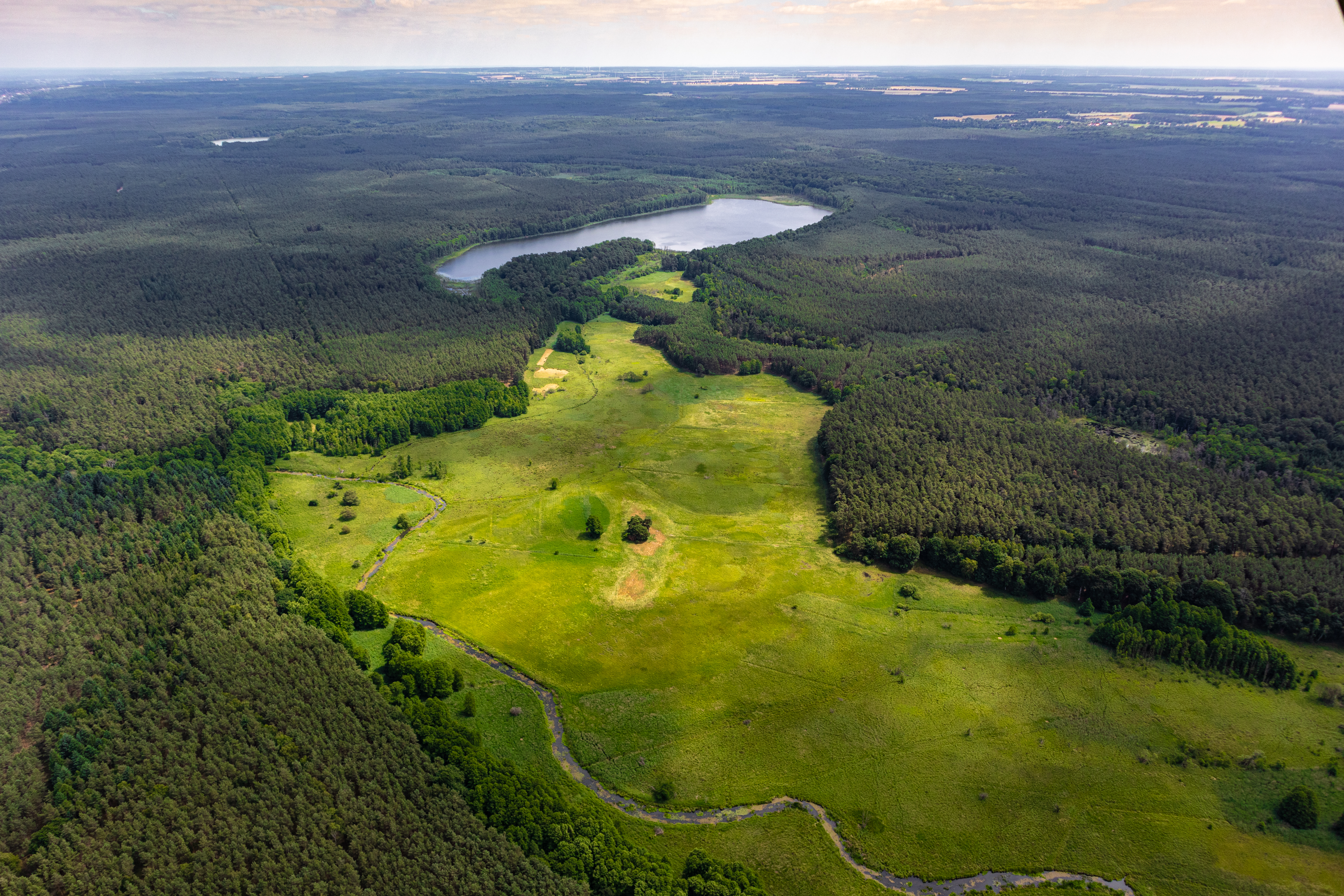
The stream Finow and the lake Großer Samithsee near Finowfurt

The following streams drain into the Havel and Spree drainage basins:

- Briese, confluence at Hohen Neuendorf
- Tegeler Fließ, which flows into Lake Tegel and onto the Havel
- Panke, confluence with the Spree in central Berlin
- Wuhle, confluence with the Spree near Köpenick
- Neuenhagener Mühlenfließ
- Fredersdorfer Mühlenfließ
- Northern tributaries of the Löcknitz (river), for example the Lichtenower Mühlenfließ

The following tributaries flow into the Oder:

- Finow, into which flow the Schwärze and Nonnenfließ tributaries at Eberswalde
- Batzlower Mühlenfließ
- Sophienfließ, which supplies the Schermützelsee and Stobber

==== Lakes ====
Despite being an area of Young Drift, Barnim has relatively few lakes. At the outwash plain, the deposition of glacio-fluvial sediment has led to a higher number of lakes, the most well-known of which are Wandlitzer See, Gamensee and Straussee.

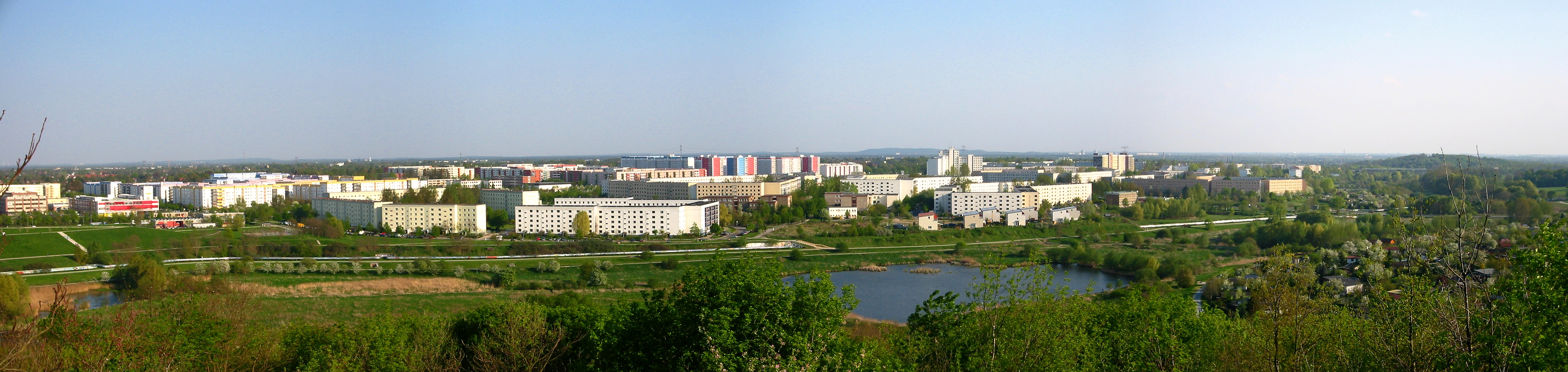
The view from Kienberg towards Hellersdorf and Kaulsdorf.

=== Climate ===
As in the rest of the region, Barnim is located in the transition zone between the oceanic climate of Western Europe and the continental climate of Eastern Europe. Due to the relatively small height differential between Upper and Lower Barnim there is little difference between the climates of the two areas. The coldest month is January with an average temperature of −1 °C and the warmest is July, with an average temperature of 18 °C. The averages for Upper Barnim are marginally lower.

The average annual precipitation for Lower Barnim is 550mm whereas in Upper Barnim it is 600mm. Due to the height of Barnim, the Oderbruch, which lies to the east and is on average 100 metres lower than Barnim, is in a rain shadow. This is compounded by the height of other surrounding areas such as Lubusz Land and Chorin. Whereas Barnim receives relatively high amounts of precipitation, the Oderbruch receives less than 500mm annually and is one of the driest regions in Germany.

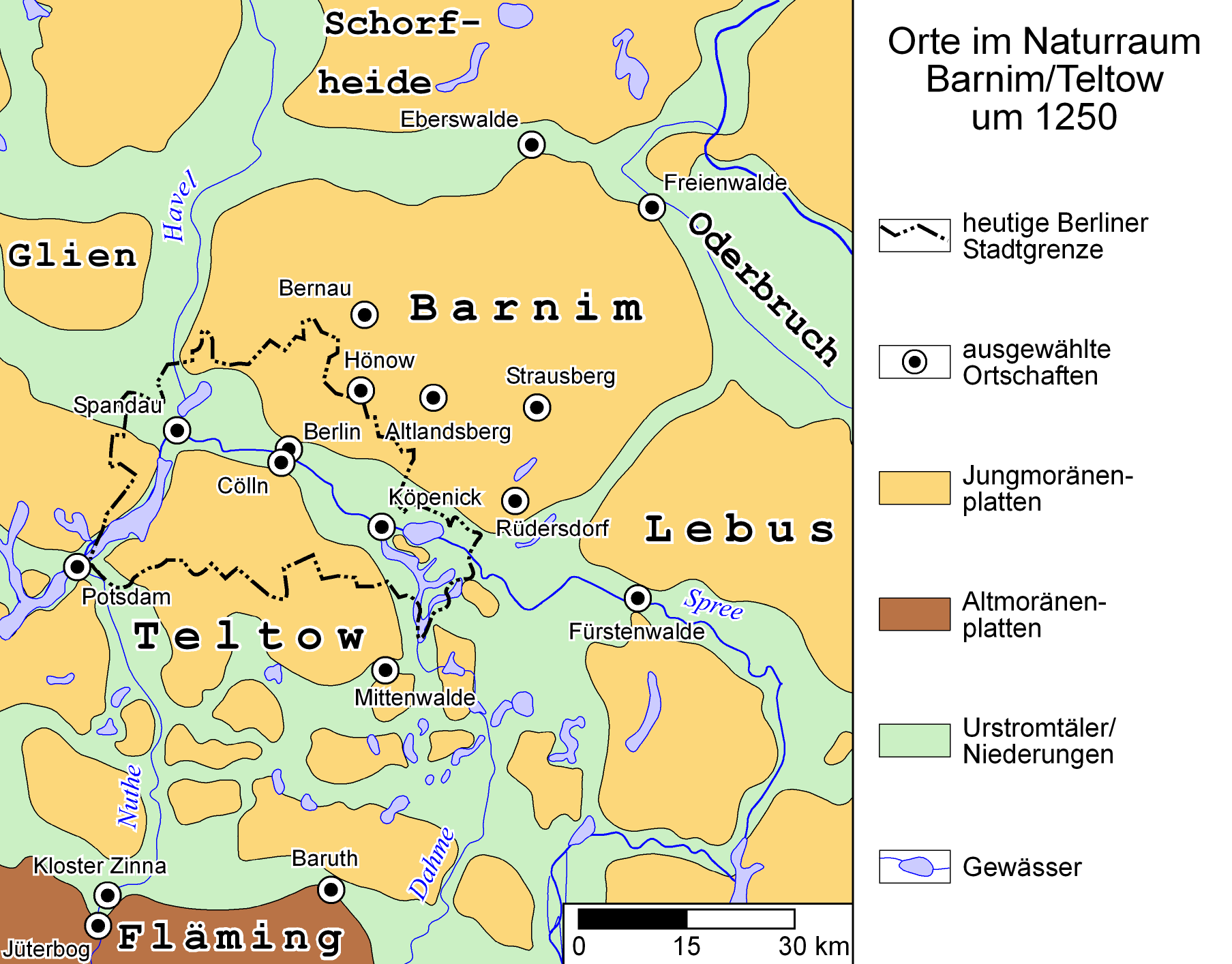
Main settlements in Barnim in 1250. The dashed line indicates the extent of modern-day Berlin.

== Settlement History ==
=== Paleolithic Age ===
There is evidence of settlement in Barnim at the time of the Allerød oscillation. Hunter-gatherers mainly followed the courses of rivers, confirmed by archaeological discoveries north of Berlin. Around 6000 years ago the first permanent agricultural settlements were established. Discoveries of sickles and troughs from the Bronze Age have been discovered in the west of Barnim.

The Germanic Semnones tribe settled in Barnim, and after their migration the Slavic stem of the Sprevane tribe followed in the 6th and 7th centuries and settled near Biesenthal and Wandlitz.

=== Settlement since 1230 ===
While the Slavic peoples tended to settle in lowland parts of Barnim near the relatively few areas, subsequent settlement of the plateau began in the 1230s by the House of Ascania under the rules of John I, Margrave of Brandenburg and Otto III, Margrave of Brandenburg as part of the German eastward expansion. Further settlement was also carried out under the House of Wettin, part of the Margravate of Meissen. The Wettiners expanded from the south with castles in Mittenwalde and Köpenick in Lower Barnim, whereas the Ascaniers expanded over the northern parts of Upper Barnim from Oranienburg to Strausberg. Conflicts over the question of territorial sovereignty contributed to the Teltow and Magdeburg Wars between 1239 and 1245 which were won by the Ascaniers. In a measure intended to cement Ascanian rule, the House founded the Chorin monastery and the Friedland convent, which is now a ruin. They are amongst the most significant medieval buildings in the region.

=== Thirty Years' War ===
After the Thirty Years' War a migration wave, mainly of Dutch colonists, arrived on Barnim. As with medieval settlement this was mainly confined to the areas along the rivers of Barnim. At the end of the 19th century the industrial revolution in Germany resulted in strong population growth in Berlin, which expanded into the plateau.

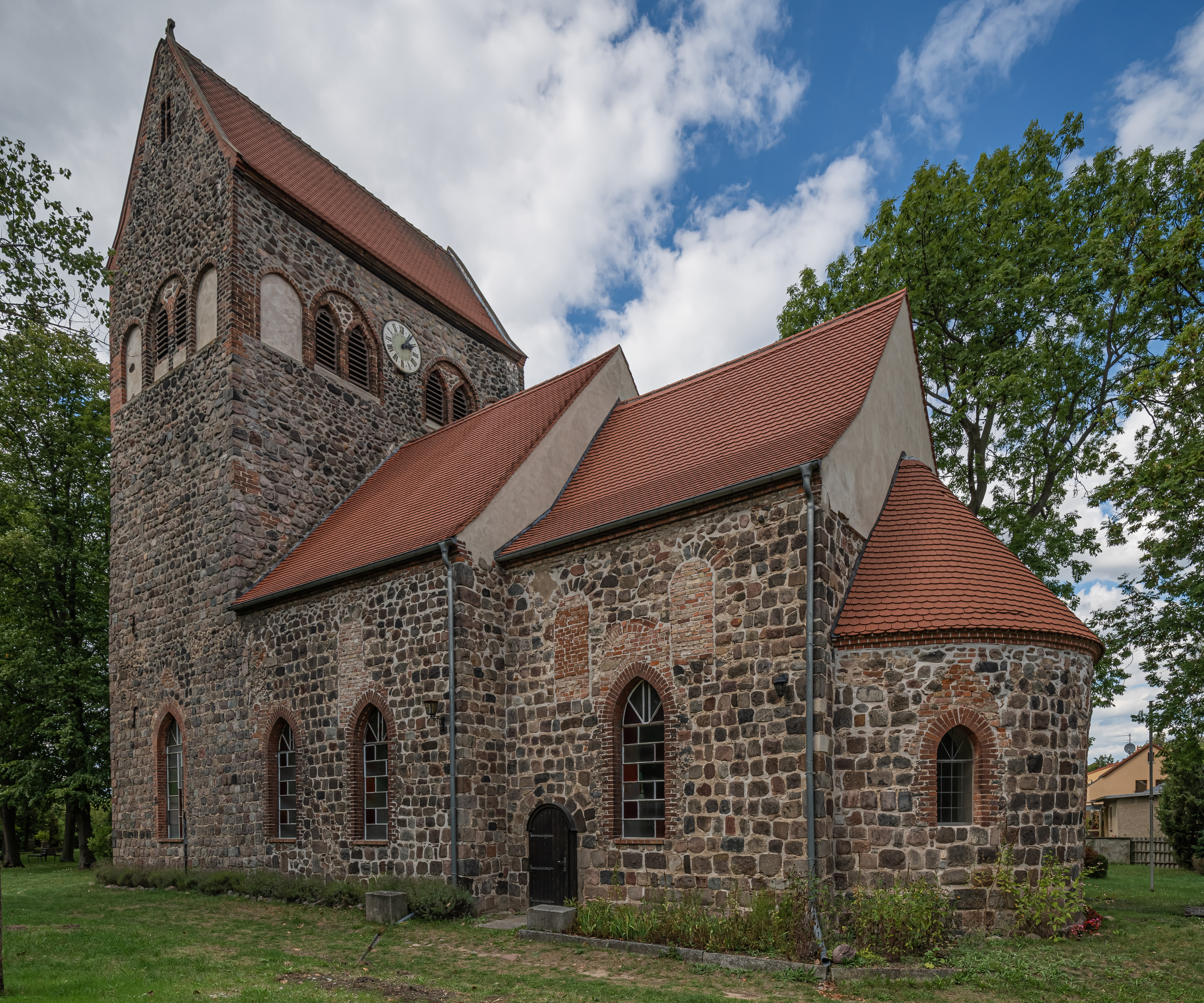
A fieldstone church in Hönow, constructed some time before 1250.

== Further reading. ==
- (in German) Brandenburgisches Namenbuch, Teil 5: Die Ortsnamen des Barnim. Bearb. v. Gerhard Schlimpert, Weimar 1984.
- (in German) Wolfgang H. Fritze: Zur Deutung und ursprünglichen Beziehung des Landschaftsnamens „Barnim“. In: Jahrbuch für brandenburgische Landesgeschichte 37 (1986), S. 41–50.
- (in German) L. Lippstreu, N. Hermsdorf, A. Sonntag: Geologische Übersichtskarte des Landes Brandenburg 1 : 300.000 - Erläuterungen. – Potsdam 1997, ISBN 3-7490-4576-3.
- (in German) Carsten Rasmus, Bettina Klaehne: Wander- und Naturführer Naturpark Barnim. KlaRas-Verlag, Berlin 2001. ISBN 3-933135-09-5.
- (in German) Werner Stackebrandt, Volker Manhenke (Hrsg.): Atlas zur Geologie von Brandenburg. Landesamt für Geowissenschaften und Rohstoffe Brandenburg (heute: Landesamt für Bergbau, Geologie und Rohstoffe Brandenburg, LBGR), 2. Aufl., 142 S., 43 Karten, Kleinmachnow 2002, ISBN 3-9808157-0-6.
- (in German) Reinhard E. Fischer, Die Ortsnamen der Länder Brandenburg und Berlin. Band 13 der Brandenburgischen Historischen Studien im Auftrag der Brandenburgischen Historischen Kommission, be.bra wissenschaft verlag Berlin-Brandenburg 2005, ISBN 3-937233-30-X, ISSN 1860-2436, Seite 43.
- (in German) Ludger Gailing, Karl-Dieter Keim: Analyse von informellen und dezentralen Institutionen und Public Governance mit kulturlandschaftlichem Hintergrund in der Beispielregion Barnim. Berlin-Brandenburgische Akademie der Wissenschaften, Materialien der Interdisziplinären Arbeitsgruppe Zukunftsorientierte Nutzung ländlicher Räume (LandInnovation), Nr. 6, Berlin, 2006 Onlinefassung
