= Teltow and Magdeburg Wars =

Inner-German wars for supremacy on the Teltow and the Barnim in the 13th century

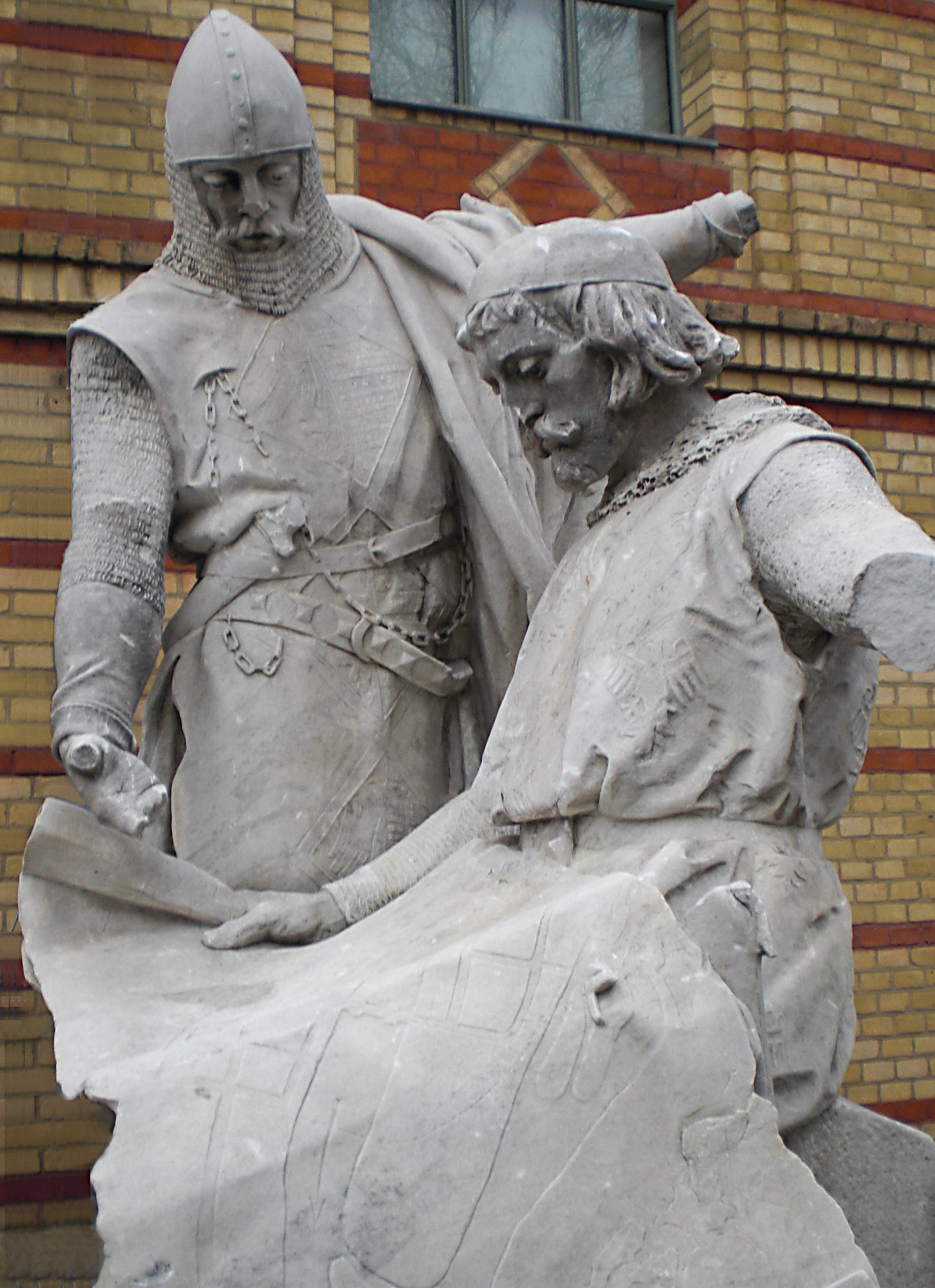
John I, Margrave of Brandenburg (sitting) and Otto III, Margrave of Brandenburg.

The Teltow and Magdeburg Wars were fought between 1239 and 1245 over possession of Barnim and Teltow in the present-day federal German state of Brandenburg. They took place in the 13th century during the course of the Eastern German Expansion. The opposing sides during the armed conflict, which took place on two fronts simultaneously, were:

- The Margraviate of Brandenburg, led by the Ascanian rulers John I, Margrave of Brandenburg and Otto III, Margrave of Brandenburg.
- The Margravate of Meissen, led by Henry III, Margrave of Meissen of the House of Wettin, and Wilbrand von Käfernburg, the then-Archbishop of Magdeburg.

At the time the Ascanians were expanding Cölln as trade centre and economic competitor to the House of Wettin's Köpenick, which laid the foundations for Berlin's subsequent economic and political domination of the area. After Ascanian victory in 1245 the Barnim and Teltow plateaus remained as part of the Margraviate of Brandenburg and the subsequent Prussian Province of Brandenburg well beyond the unification of Germany in 1871. Since 1920 huge parts of the plateaus form part of Greater Berlin, itself no part of Brandenburg any more, but a city-state within Germany, whereas the parts of the plateaus further away from Berlin city centre form now parts of the present districts Barnim and Teltow-Fläming in the State of Brandenburg.

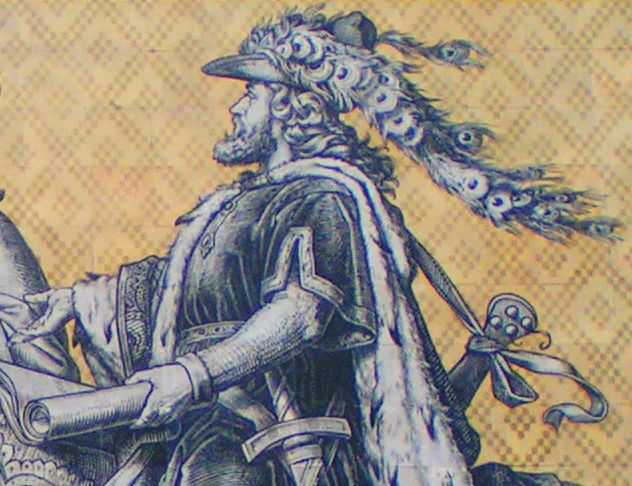
Henry III, Margrave of Meissen
