= Glien Plateau =

Plateau in Germany

The Glien Plateau (German: Ländchen Glien) is a plateau located in the federal state of Brandenburg, Germany. It is located 12-15 kilometres northwest of Berlin and is adjacent to the larger Barnim Plateau.
