= Müggelberge =

Hills in southeastern Berlin

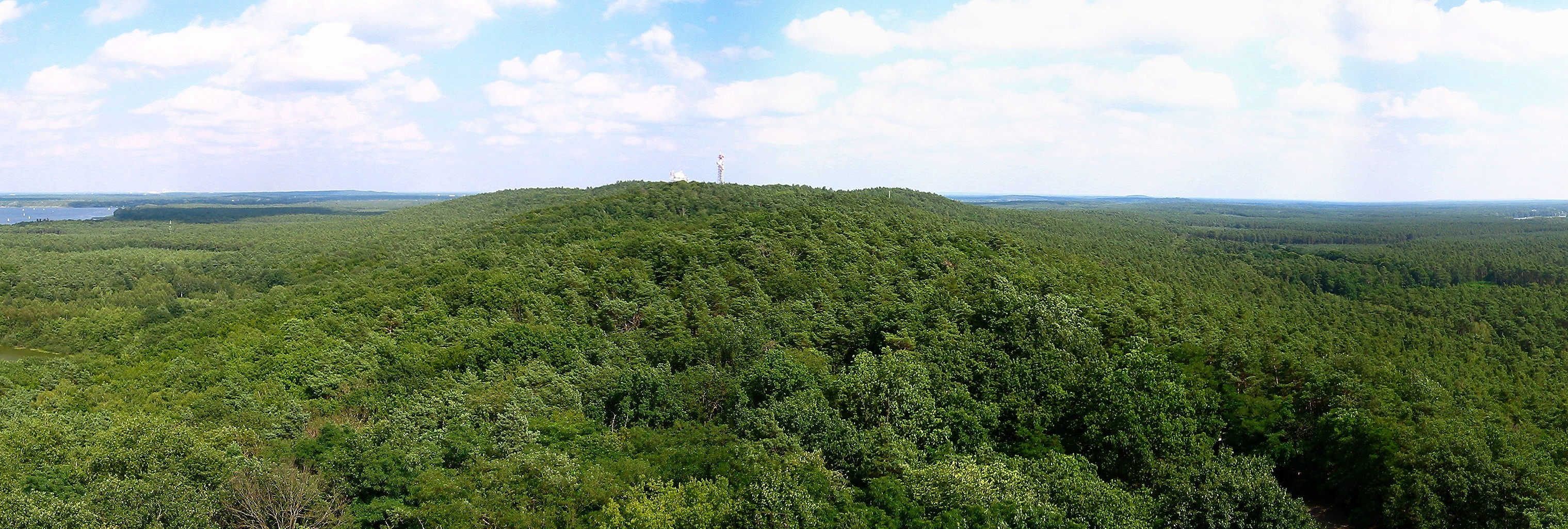
- View from the Müggel Tower looking east along the Müggelberge

Highest point
- Peak: Großer Müggelberg
- Elevation: 114.7 m above NHN

Geography
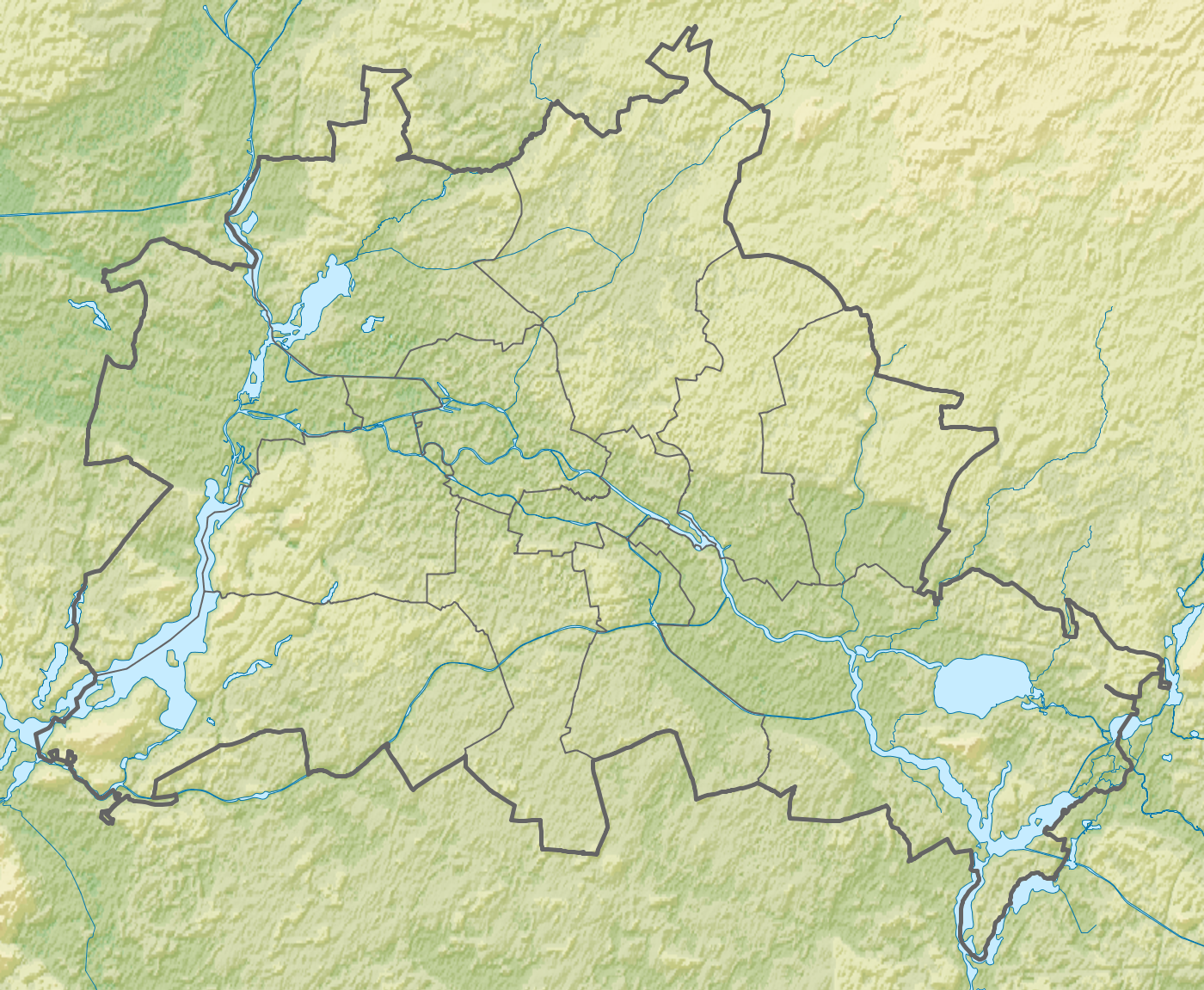
- Location within Berlin
- Country: Germany
- State: Berlin
- Range coordinates: 52°24′58″N 13°38′00″E

Geology
- Orogeny: Terminal moraine
- Rock age: Weichselian glaciation (about 20,000 years ago)
- Rock type(s): Glacial meltwater sand, occasional till

The Müggelberge (also formerly called the Müggelsberge; English: Muggle Mountains) are a wooded line of hills with heights up to 114.7 m above sea level (NHN) in the southeast of Berlin's Treptow-Köpenick quarter. They are dominated by the Kleiner Müggelberg (88.3 m) and Großer Müggelberg (114.7 m). The Müggelberge cover an area of around seven square kilometres. The ridge was formed during the ice age.

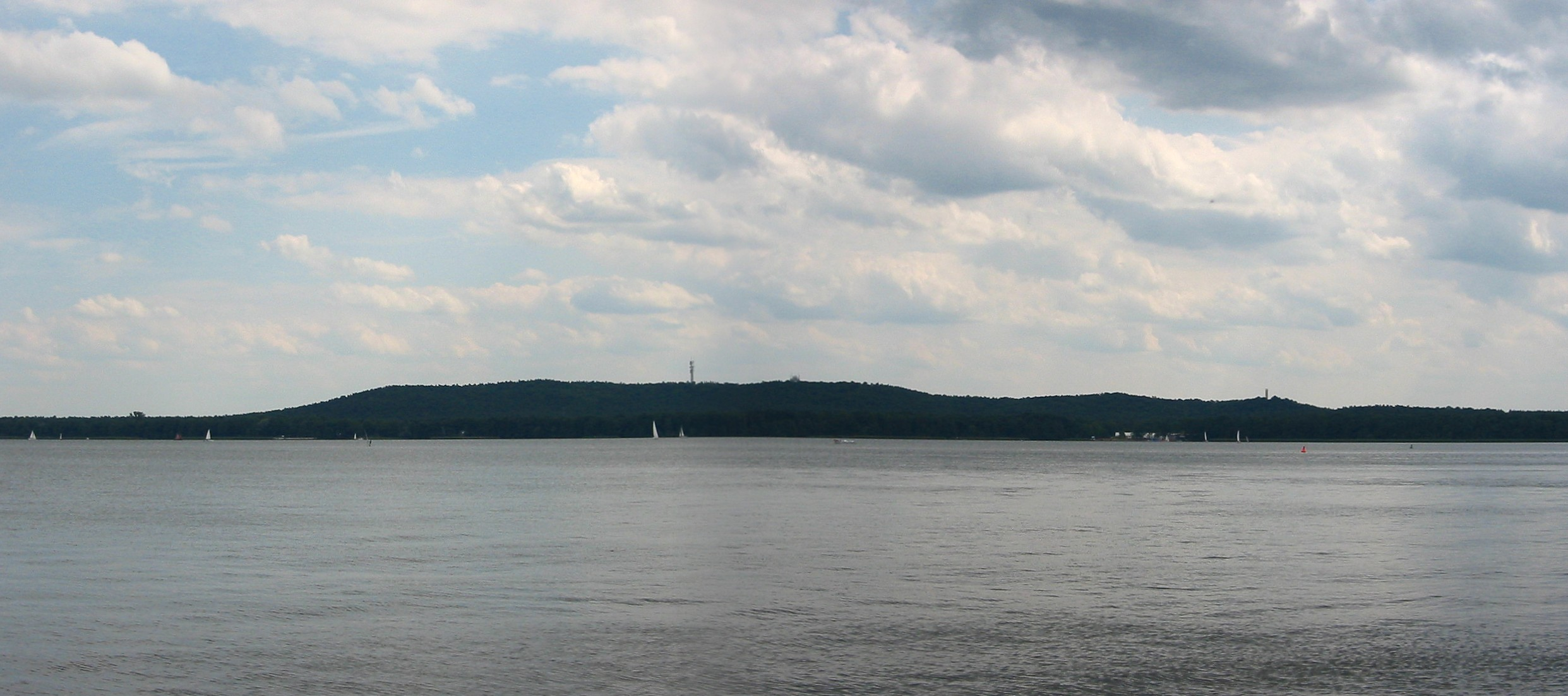
View from Friedrichshagen

A viewing tower called the Müggelturm has been erected on the hills with a view of the Müggelsee and the Berlin-Müggelberge TV Tower.
