= Wuhlebecken =

Lake in Berlin, Germany

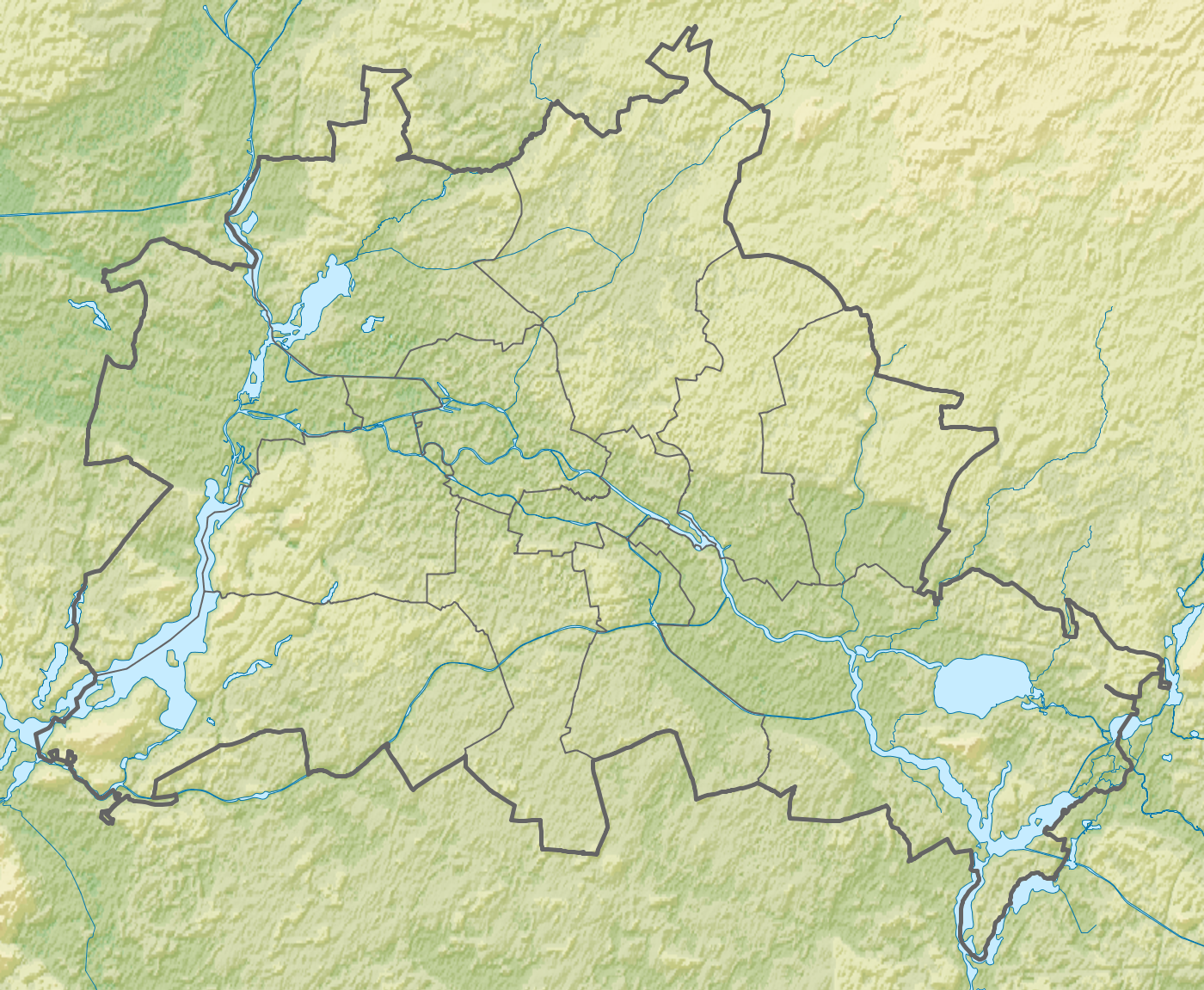
- Location within Berlin

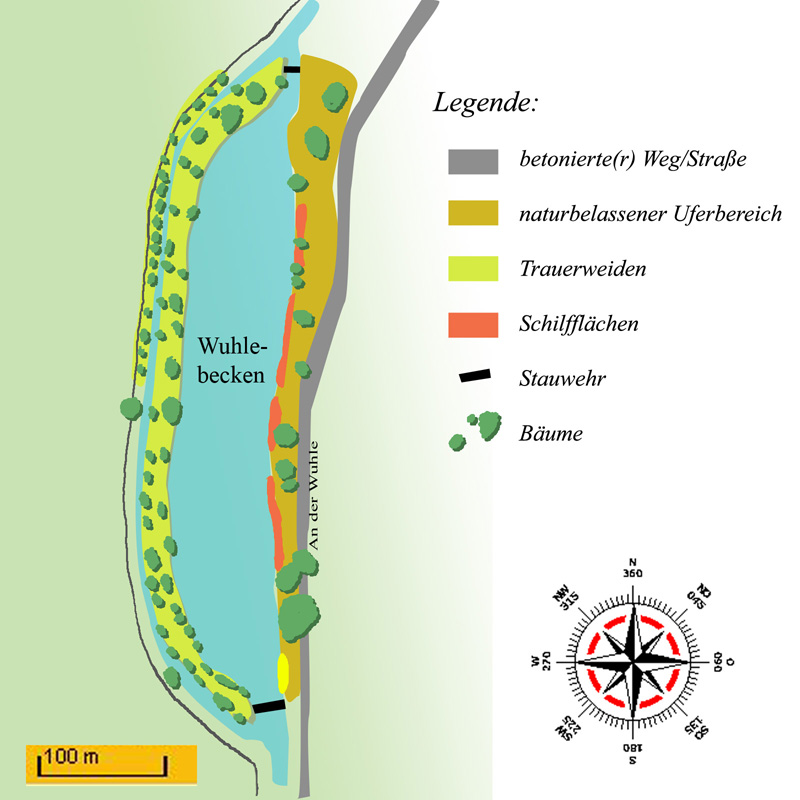
- Location: Berlin
- Coordinates: 52°28′55″N 13°33′44″E
- Primary inflows: Wuhle
- Primary outflows: Wuhle
- Basin countries: Germany
- Surface area: 6 ha (15 acres)
- Max. depth: 5 m (16 ft)
- Surface elevation: 33 m (108 ft)
- Settlements: Biesdorf-Süd, Kaulsdorf-Süd

Wuhlebecken (also known as Lake Wuhle) is a lake in Berlin, Germany. At an elevation of 33 m, its surface area is 6 ha.
