= Wuhle =

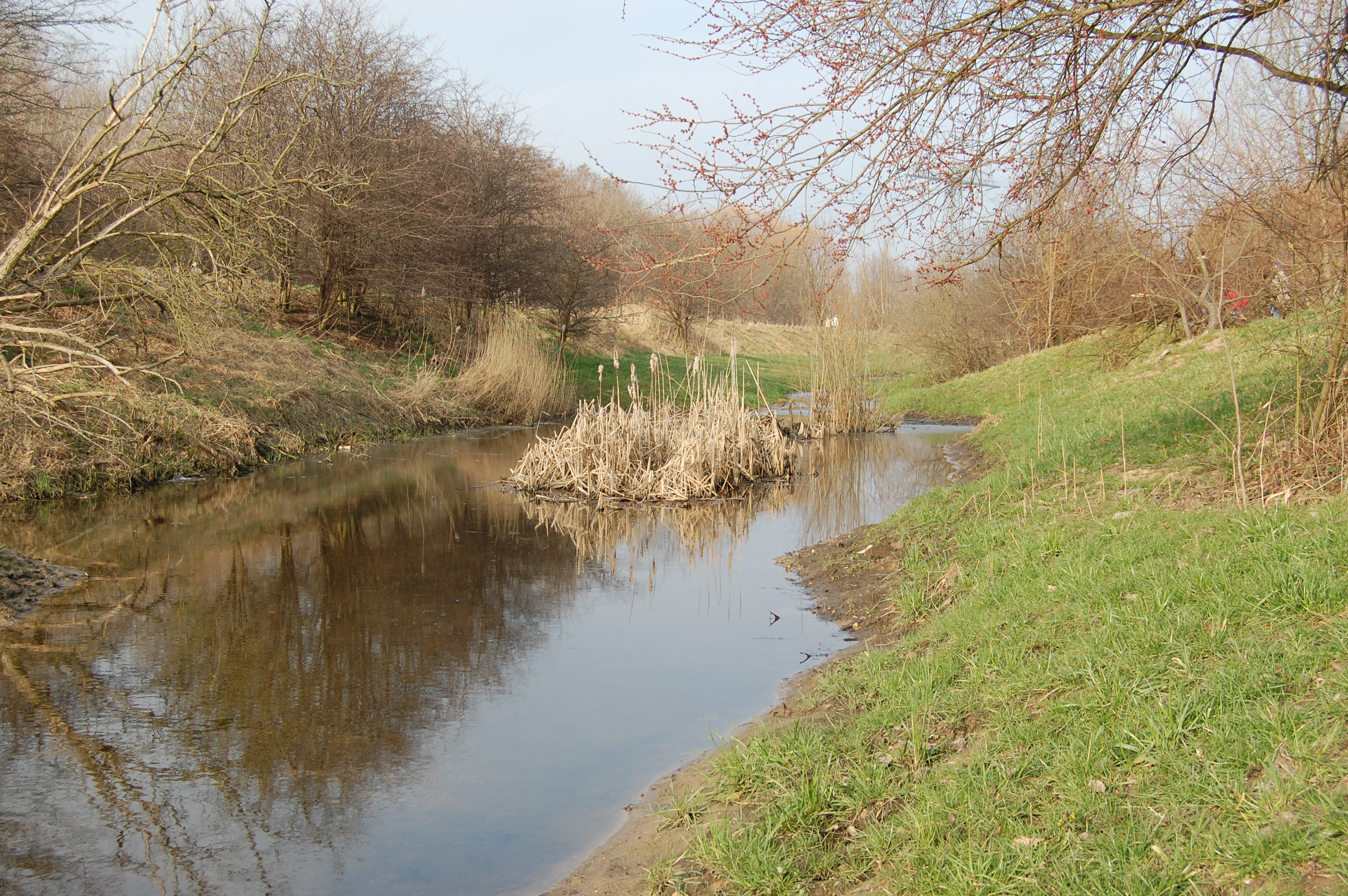
- The Wuhle, as seen between Marzahn and Hellersdorf

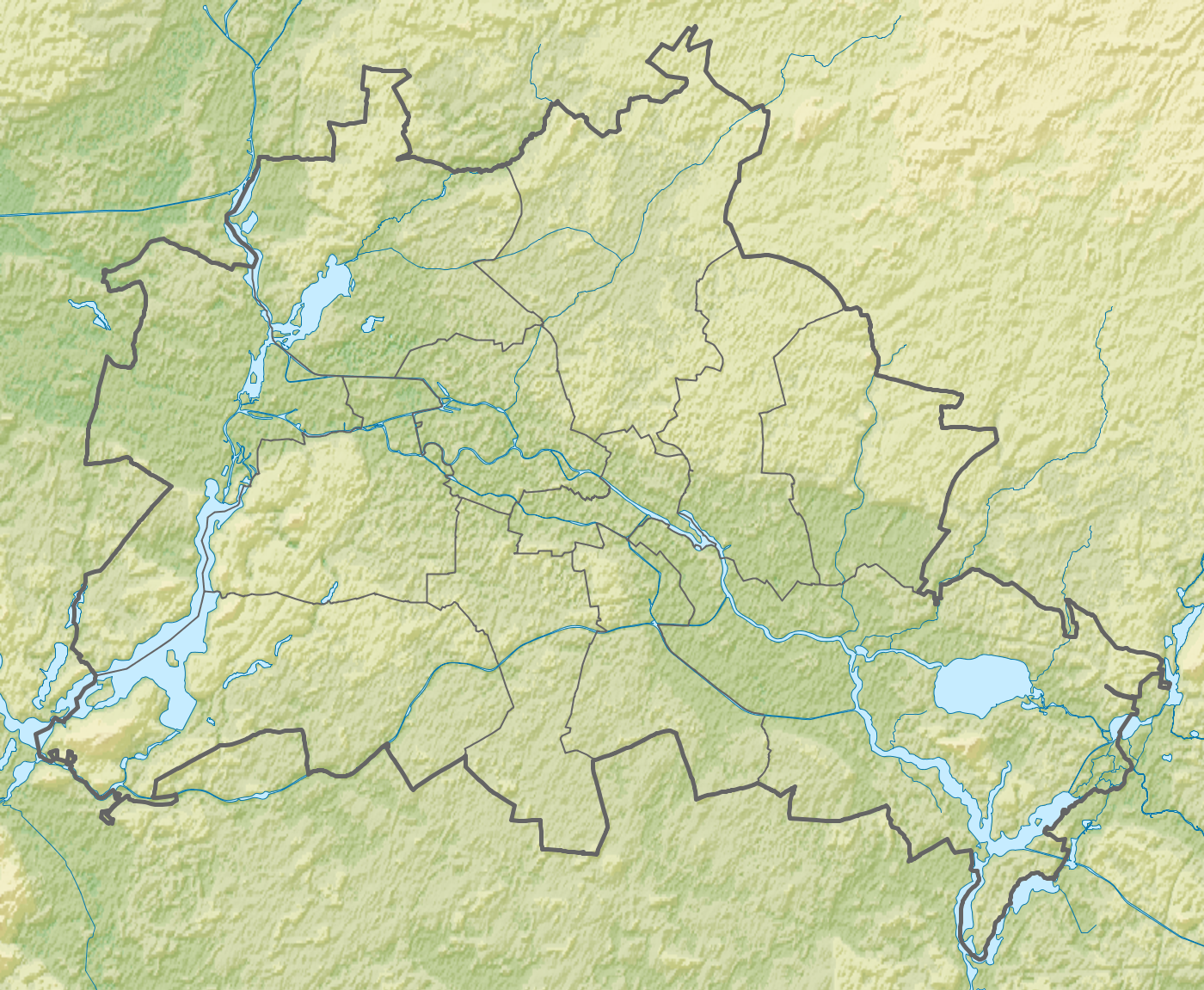
- Location within Berlin Location within Germany

Location
- Country: Germany
- State: Brandenburg

Physical characteristics
- Source: Forested area near Ahrensfelde
  - coordinates: 52°35′46″N 13°34′13″E
  - elevation: 61 metres (200 ft) above Normalhöhennull (NHN)
- Mouth: Spree
  - coordinates: 52°27′16″N 13°33′54″E
  - elevation: 30 metres (98 ft) above NHN
- Length: 16.5 kilometres (10.3 mi)
- Basin size: 118 square kilometres (46 sq mi)
- Discharge
  - location: Honsfelder Bridge (5.8 km upstream the mouth)
  - average: 1.05 m^{3}/s (37 cu ft/s)

Basin features
- Progression: Spree→ Havel→ Elbe→ North Sea
- Tributaries
  - left: Hellersdorfer Graben
  - right: Neue Wuhle
- Waterbodies: Wuhleteich, Wuhlebecken

The Wuhle is a small right-bank tributary of the Spree. It originates in a ground moraine in Brandenburg near Ahrensfelde and flows through the Berlin boroughs of Marzahn-Hellersdorf and Treptow-Köpenick before joining the Spree.

It is the primary in- and outflow of the Wuhlebecken.

The Wuhle is depicted in the coat of arms of Marzahn-Hellersdorf. Berlin Wuhletal station is also named after the Wuhle valley (German: Wuhletal), which is named after the Wuhle.

== See also ==
- List of rivers of Brandenburg
