= Müggelturm =

Coordinates: 52°25′02″N 13°37′30″E

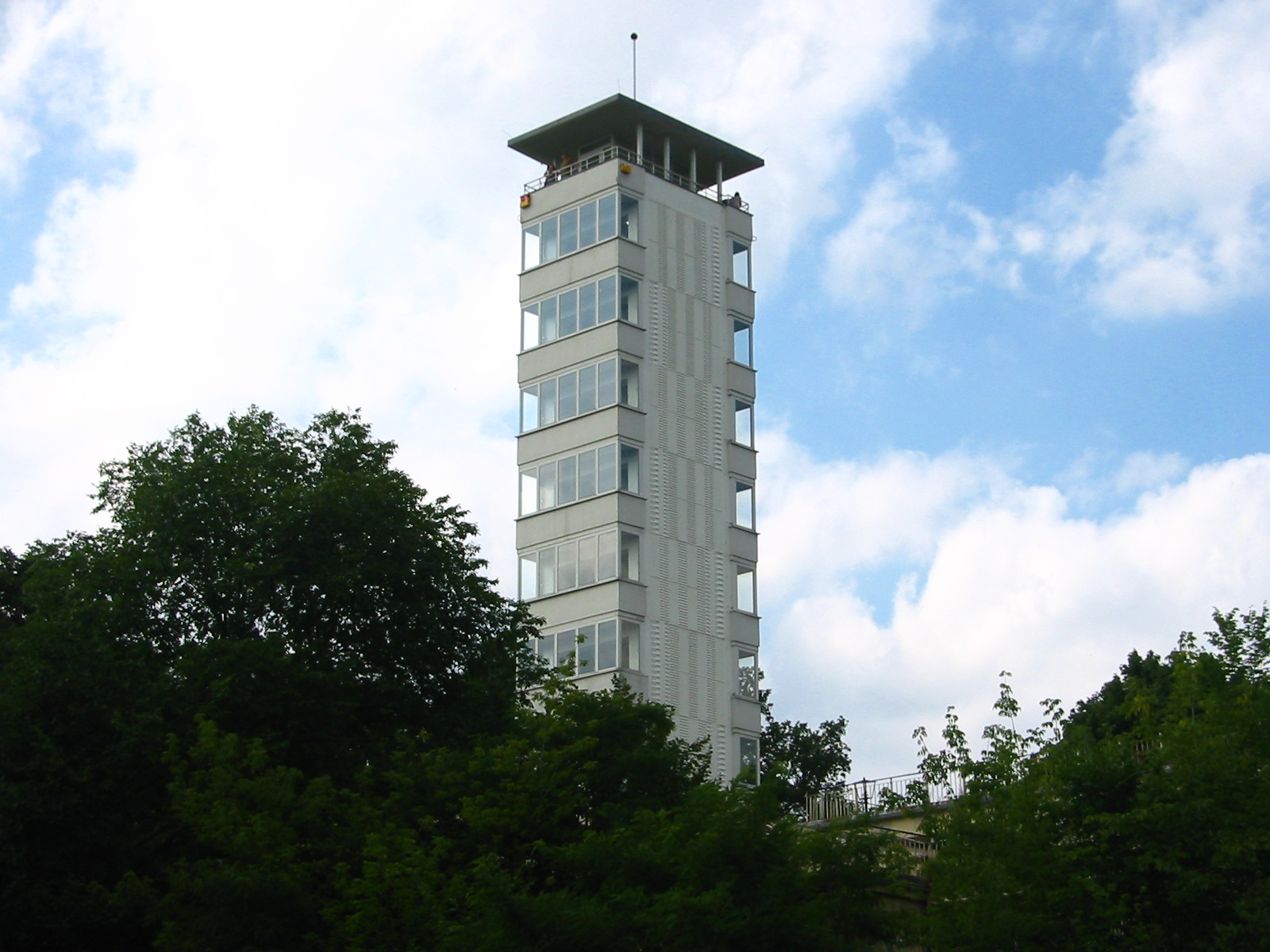
The Müggelturm in 2005

The Müggelturm (“Müggel Tower”) is a popular day-trip destination in Köpenick, in southeastern Berlin, Germany. It is located to the south of the Müggelsee lake in the Müggelberg hills atop the Kleiner Müggelberg (“Small Müggelhill”). Berlin's highest natural elevation is the nearby Großer Müggelberg at 115 m.

== Access ==
The Müggelturm area can be reached from the former Marienlust restaurant to the south at the River Dahme via a footpath ending in a stairway (374 steps), or from lake Teufelssee in the northeast up another stairway (111 steps). From the street Müggelheimer Damm there is a road leading to the tower (named Straße zum Müggelturm), but cars must be left at a parking lot a few hundred metres before the plateau.

== The early towers ==
In 1880, Carl Spindler, owner of the Köpenick laundry and dyeworks W. Spindler (and source of the name of the Berlin district Spindlersfeld), had a 10 m high wooden lookout tower, known as the Spindlerturm, built on the Kleiner Müggelberg. Because of its low height there was not much of a view and it accordingly attracted few visitors. In 1889 Spinder spent 40,000 marks to extend the tower, now 27 metres high, and choosing an architecture reminiscent of a pagoda, It opened to the public on 1 April 1890 and had a quadratic base of 5 m per side tapering to 4.2 m above the restaurant and 2.8 m at the viewing platform. This tower was also a wooden construction and had a shingled facing. The architect was Max Jacob; and the first restaurant manager was Carl Streichhahn. The enlarged tower and its restaurant rapidly became a popular excursion destination. From the platform at the top a panoramic view extended as far as 50 km on clear days and included the region's forest and lake landscape and the Berlin skyline. There were some 52,000 visitors already in its first year of operation.

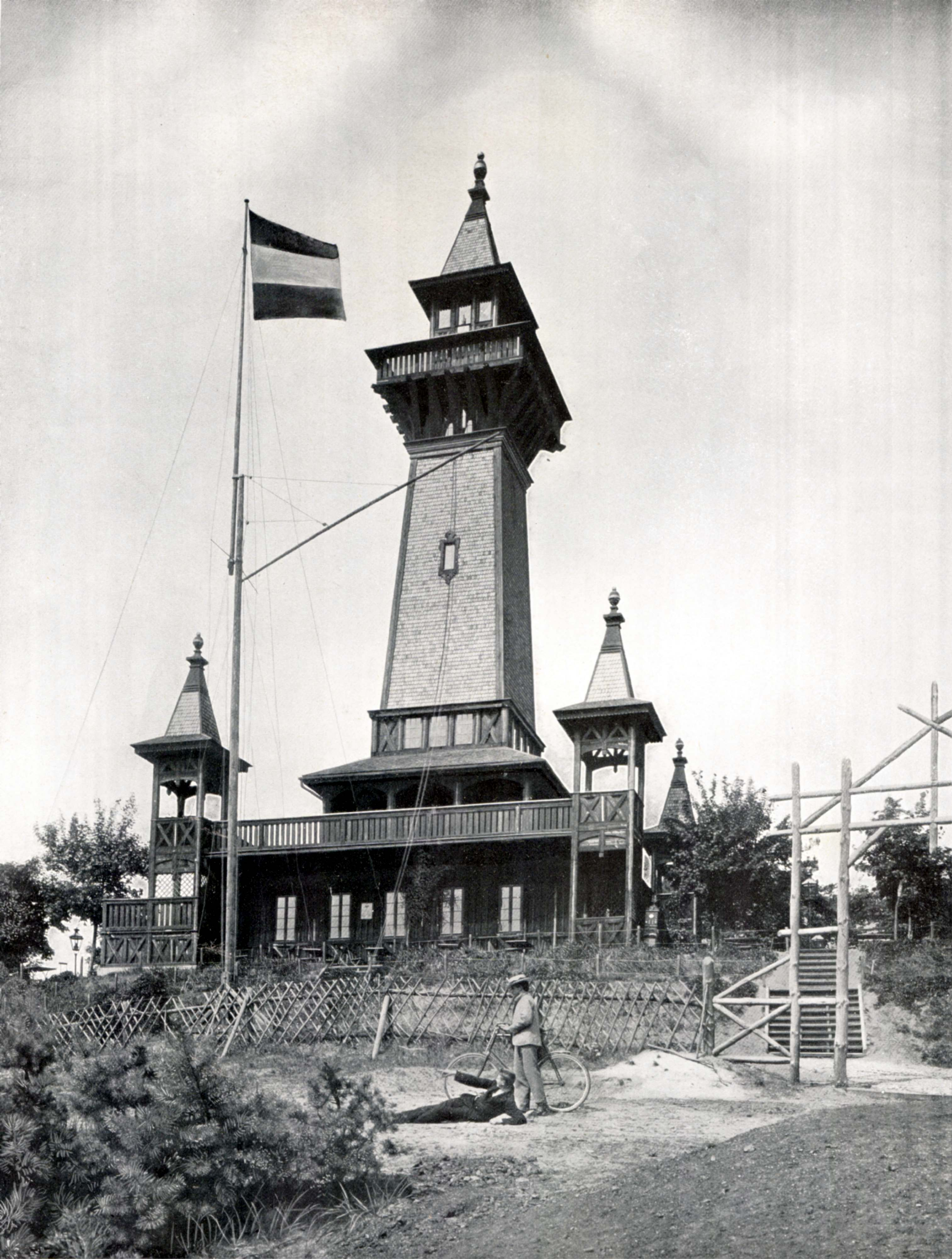
The historic tower around 1900

In 1924 the architect Walter Wichelhaus purchased the tower and in the following years carried out structural improvements on the Kleiner Müggelberg. He constructed several buildings which included a new restaurant, a kitchen, and an apartment for himself. During excavation work for these new outbuildings prehistoric relicts were found. In 1926 a new terrace with a large hall at the side was built in front of the tower. Here Wichelhaus and the Märkisches Museum displayed a collection entitled “Geschichte des Müggellandes und der Müggelberge” (“History of the Müggel Area and the Müggel Hills”) with prehistoric artifacts from the Müggel region. Visitors could learn something about the culture of the local inhabitants during the stone age, Bronze Age and Iron Age, as well as about the Sprewanen, a Wendish tribe which lived in the Dahme-Spree region. A famous exhibit item was a molar from a mammoth. Another part of the exhibit provided the evidence that there was formerly a large hall on the Kleiner Müggelberg which probably served as a place of ritual worship for the Sprewanen. In 1928 two stairways were constructed up the Kleiner Müggelberg. In 1942 the museum's artifacts were moved to the Schmetterlingshorst restaurant, where they could be viewed there together with the world-famous butterfly collection of the restaurant's owner, Büttner. Both collections were destroyed in bombing raids during World War II.

In 1945 as the Soviet army approached Berlin the tower was declared a military object and used as a radio transmission tower as well as an observation post for artillery units. As was the case with the Bismarck vantage point on the neighboring Großer Müggelberg, the Müggel tower was to be blown up by German troops before the arrival of the advancing Soviet army. The tower restaurant proprietor Walter Wichelhaus prevented this destruction by cutting the electrical cable leading to the explosives.

After the war a restaurant was again provided for visitors, and in 1956 HO Köpenick took over operation of the Müggel Tower grounds. In January 1957 the Müggel Tower was closed because its dilapidated state made it unsafe; the following month the Berlin magistrate decided to stabilize the tower with a new foundation and the addition of a steel truss construction. As part of this work the restaurant was to be enlarged, but on the afternoon of 19 May 1958 the tower burned down completely, the probable cause being welding activities during the renovation.

== Today’s tower ==
That same year the Berliner Zeitung launched an architectural competition for a new construction, which attracted 32 designs. These were exhibited to the public in August 1958 in the Köpenick city hall and a month later in the newspaper's pavilion at the Friedrichstraße train station. The opinions expressed by visitors in a book made available for the purpose confirmed the choice of the jurors. The proposal by a student collective from the Kunsthochschule Berlin-Weißensee headed by Jörg Streitparth, Siegfried Wagner and Klaus Weißhaupt won the competition and after modification it formed the basis of the new construction. An oval ground plan was originally intended for the tower, but this was changed to today's quadratic form for reasons of cost.

The foundation stone was laid on 6 October 1959 and on 20 August 1960 the topping out ceremony was celebrated. The tower was opened on New Year's Eve, 31 December 1961. The construction of the new Müggel Tower was significantly supported by public involvement and donations. As part of the German Democratic Republic's initiative calling for voluntary, charitable work (“Nationale Aufbauwerk”), the public contributed 130,000 Marks and 3,700 hours of work.

The 29.61 m high tower of reinforced concrete has nine storeys with panorama windows and a platform which can be reached via 126 steps. Along with its auxiliary buildings it reflects a modern approach in contrast to the eclecticism of the previous construction and is an early example of DDR architecture in the style of socialist classicism. The gastronomy area includes a restaurant, a wine tavern and sun terraces. The new tower again became a centre of attraction for Berlin's populace, with an average of 240,000 visitors annually. Especially on holidays such as Pentecost there were large crowds in the tower and gastronomy area. A lack of maintenance effort continues to plague the area. In 1996 the tower itself was fully renovated with EU financing amounting to one million DM, but more work remains to be done.

In a restaurant flower window can be found the triangulation point “1st order Müggelberg,” which is important for Berlin and German geodesy as it defines the zero point of the coordinate network for Berlin topographical maps. The stone is also a memorial to Johann Jacob Baeyer (1794–1885) who was born in Müggelheim and is known for his role in determining central European longitude and latitude degree coordinates. He also used the Müggelberg hills along with measurements of the city of Berlin to determine the elevation of the immediate surroundings, such as the height of Köpenick's St. Laurentius church and the Gosener mountains. Since the stone and its precise location as a surveying point is protected, it cannot be moved without the consent of the Berlin Senate (Senatsverwaltung für Stadtentwicklung).

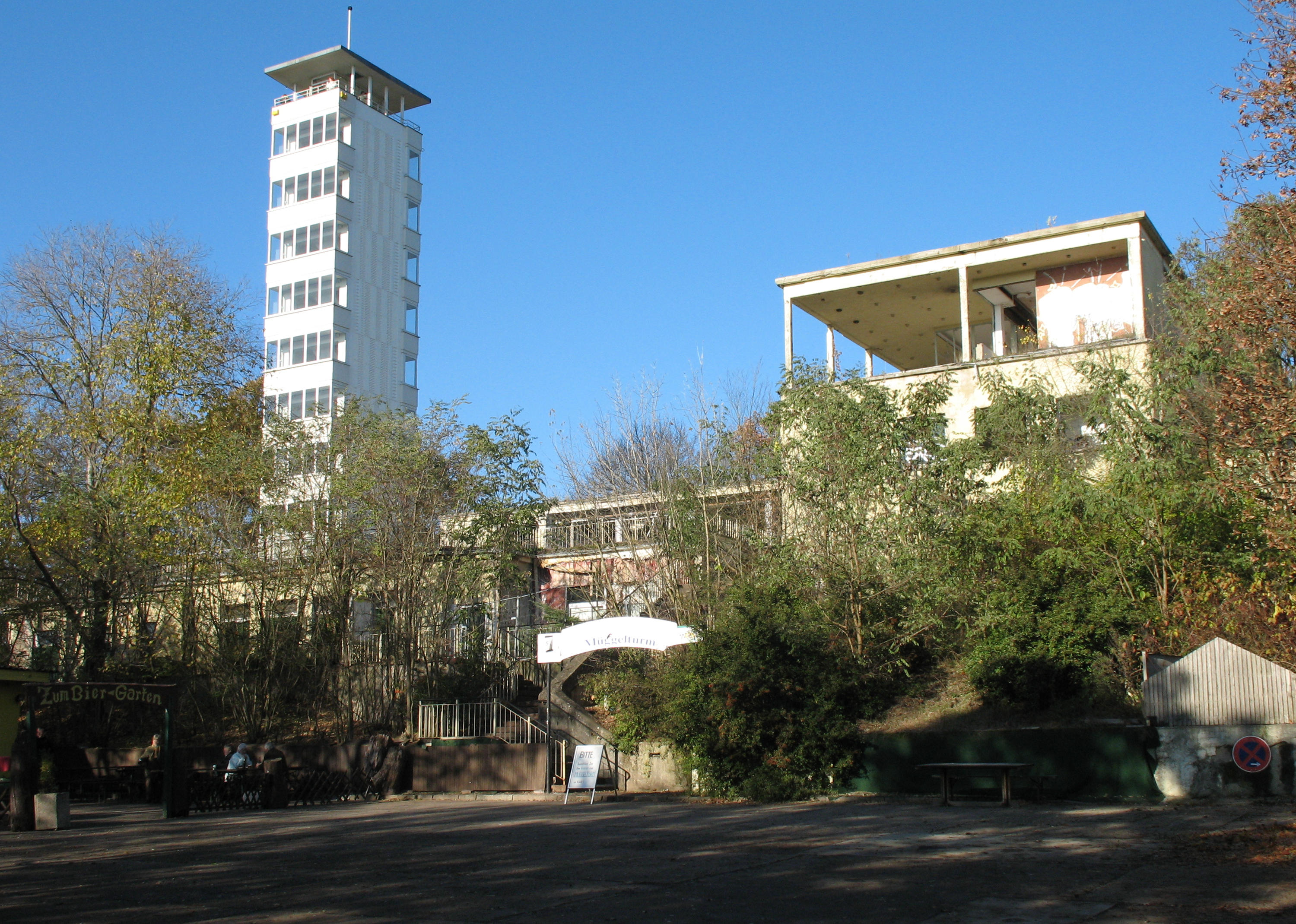
The Müggelturm in 2009

== The situation after 1990 and new utilization concepts ==
In 1995 the city of Berlin became owner of the area and the district of Köpenick has administered it ever since. In the same year the building on the Kleiner Müggelberg received the status of a listed monument. Since 2000 a number of invitations to tender have been issued in a search for an investor to develop and maintain the area. Proposals included construction of a hotel, a restaurant, and renovation of the water and power supplies, but none were accepted for various reasons. In 2007 the property was sold to an investor from Krefeld.
