= Müggelsee =

Freshwater lake in Berlin, Germany

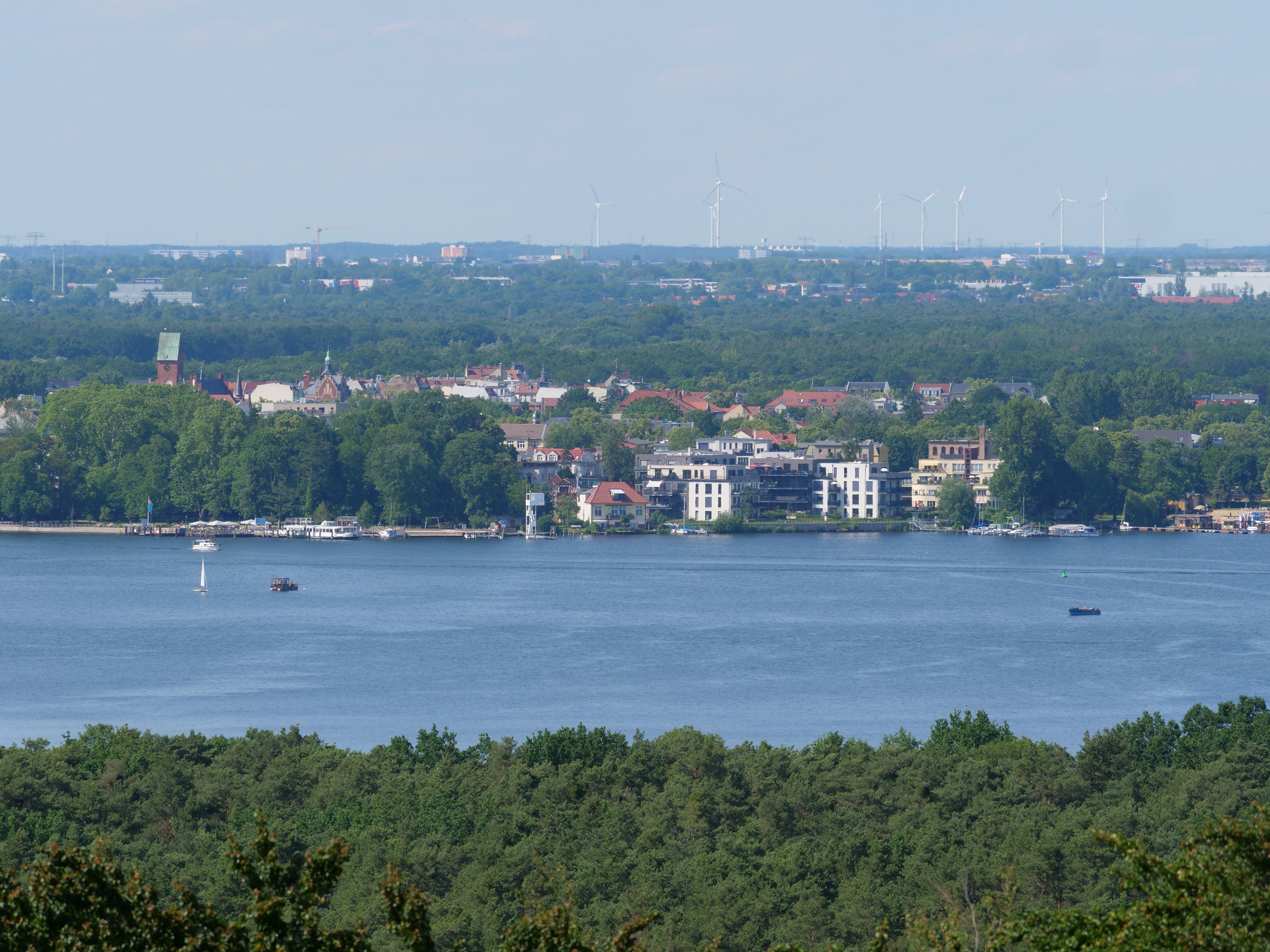

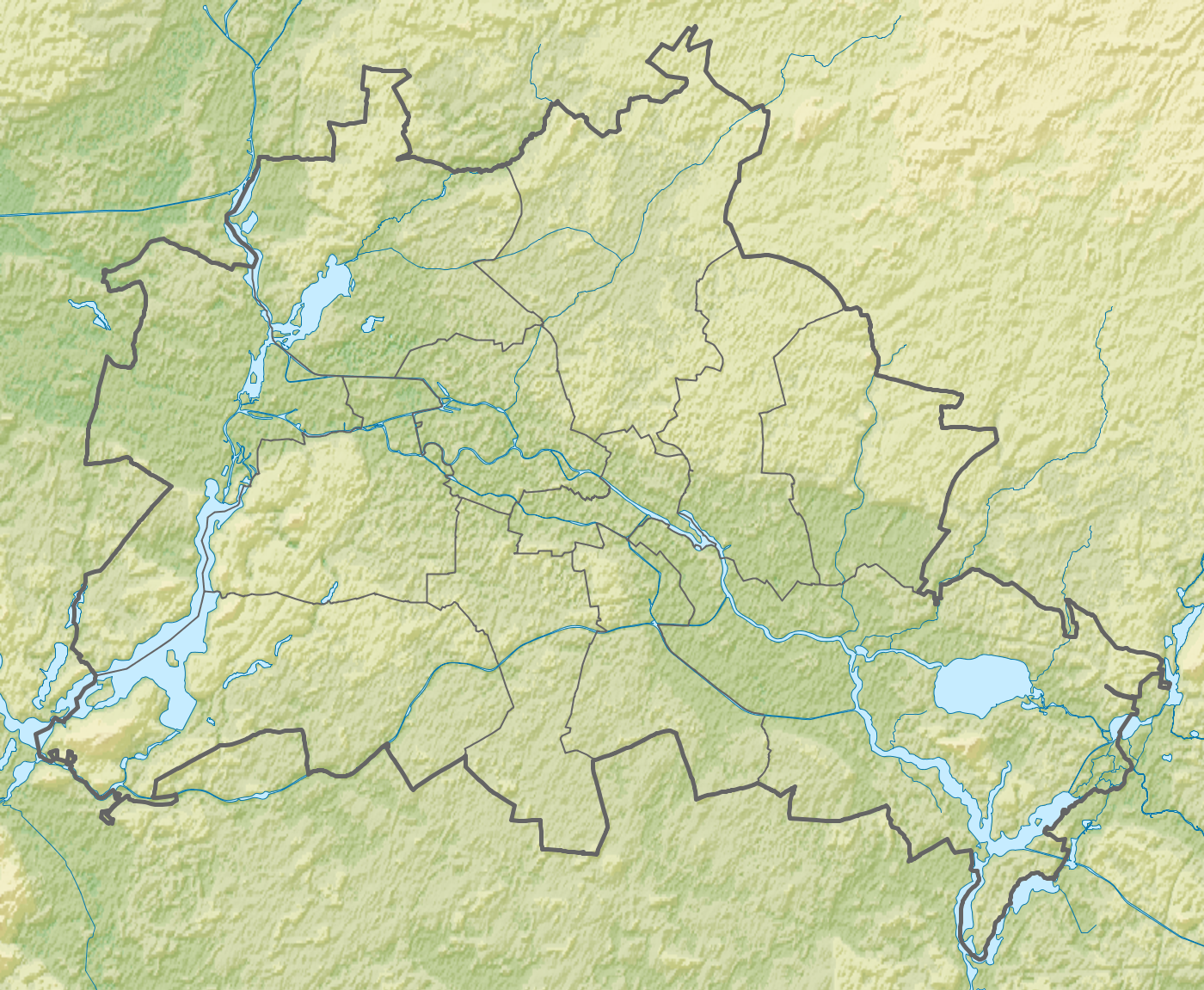
- Location within Berlin Location within Germany
- Location: Treptow-Köpenick, Berlin
- Coordinates: 52°26′N 13°39′E
- Primary inflows: Spree
- Primary outflows: Spree
- Basin countries: Germany
- Max. length: 4.3 km (2.7 mi)
- Max. width: 2.6 km (1.6 mi)
- Surface area: 7.4 km^{2} (2.9 mi^{2})
- Max. depth: 8 m (26 ft)

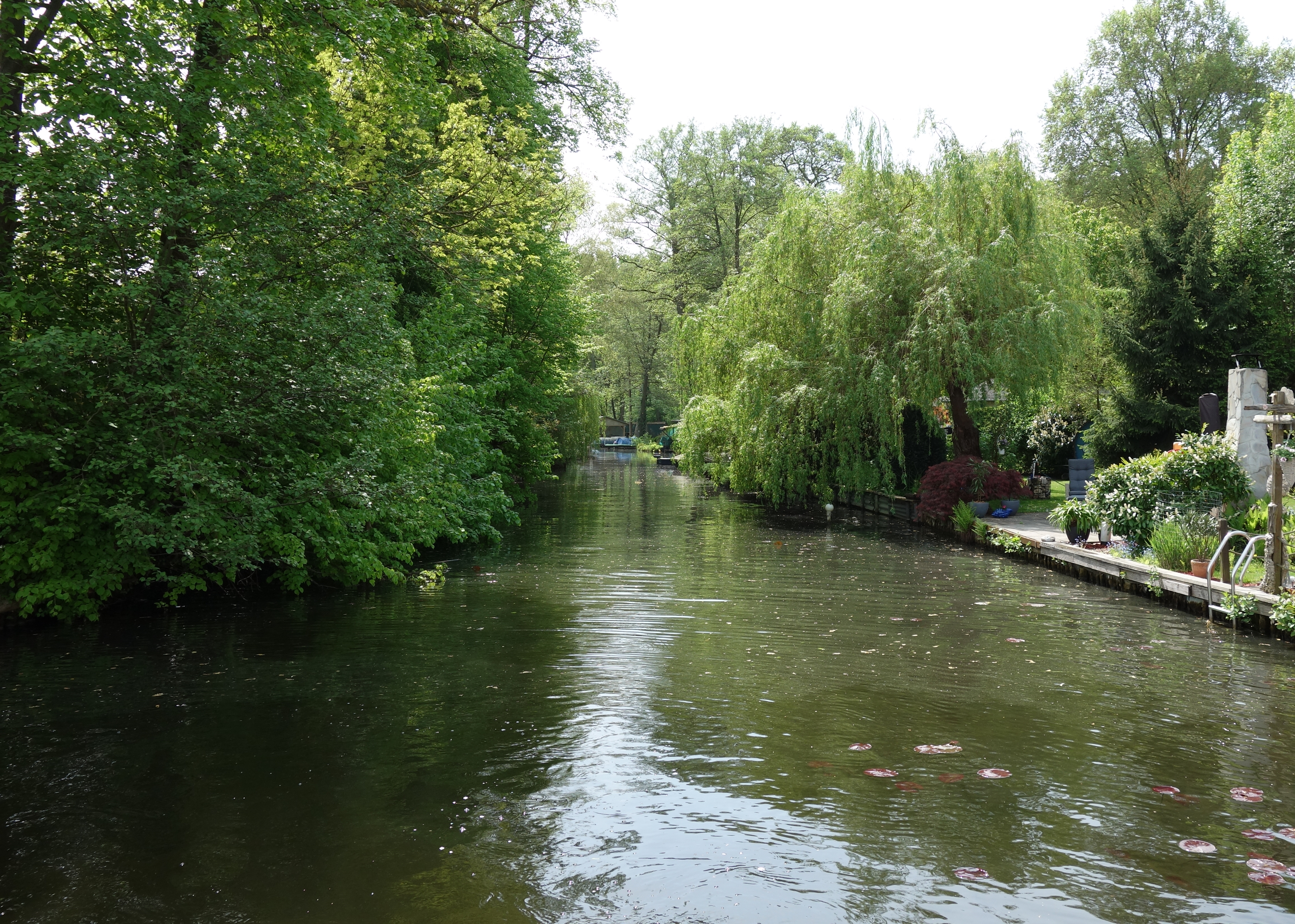
Bank vegetation

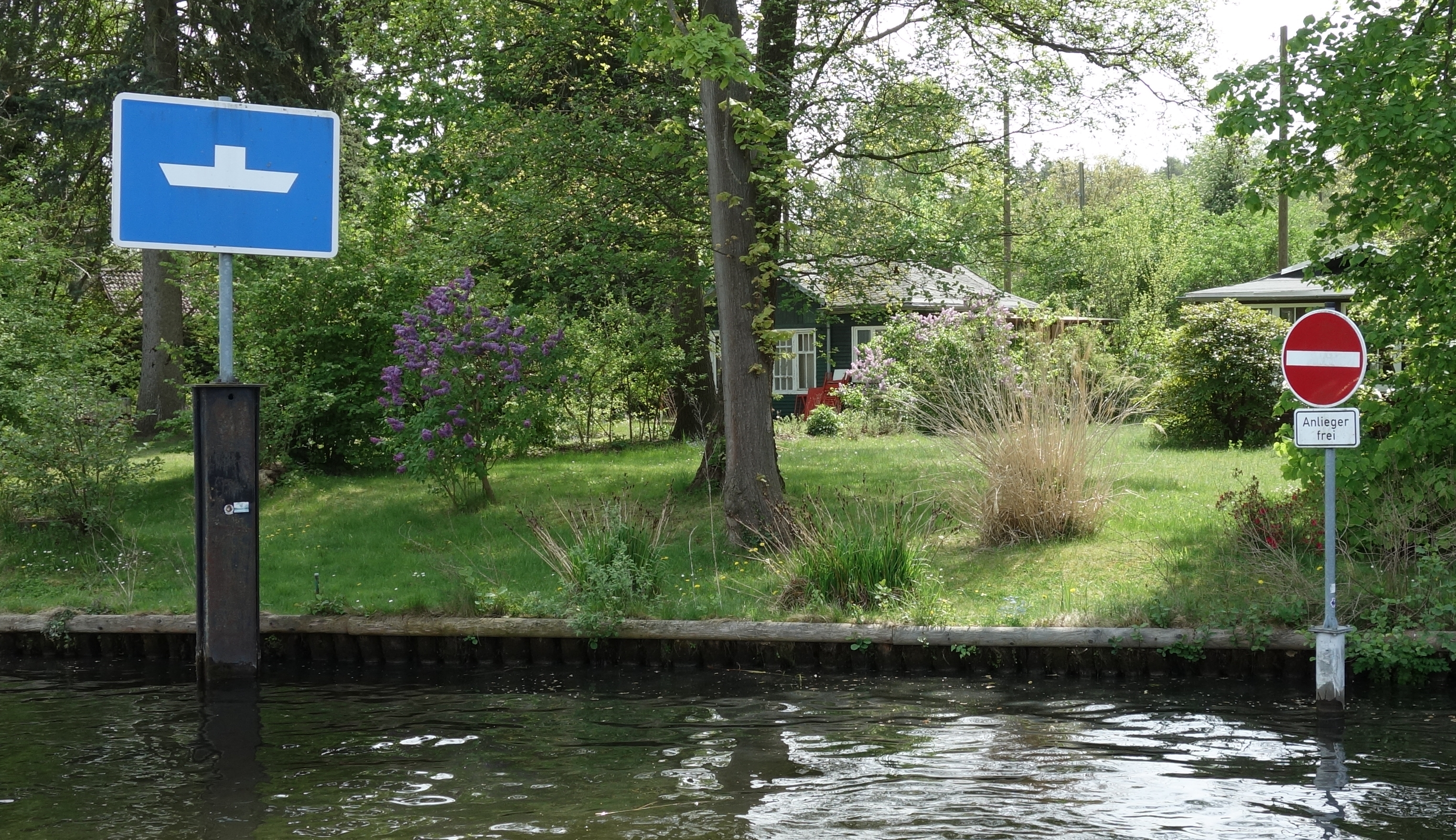
Navigation Signs (partially correspond to road traffic signs)

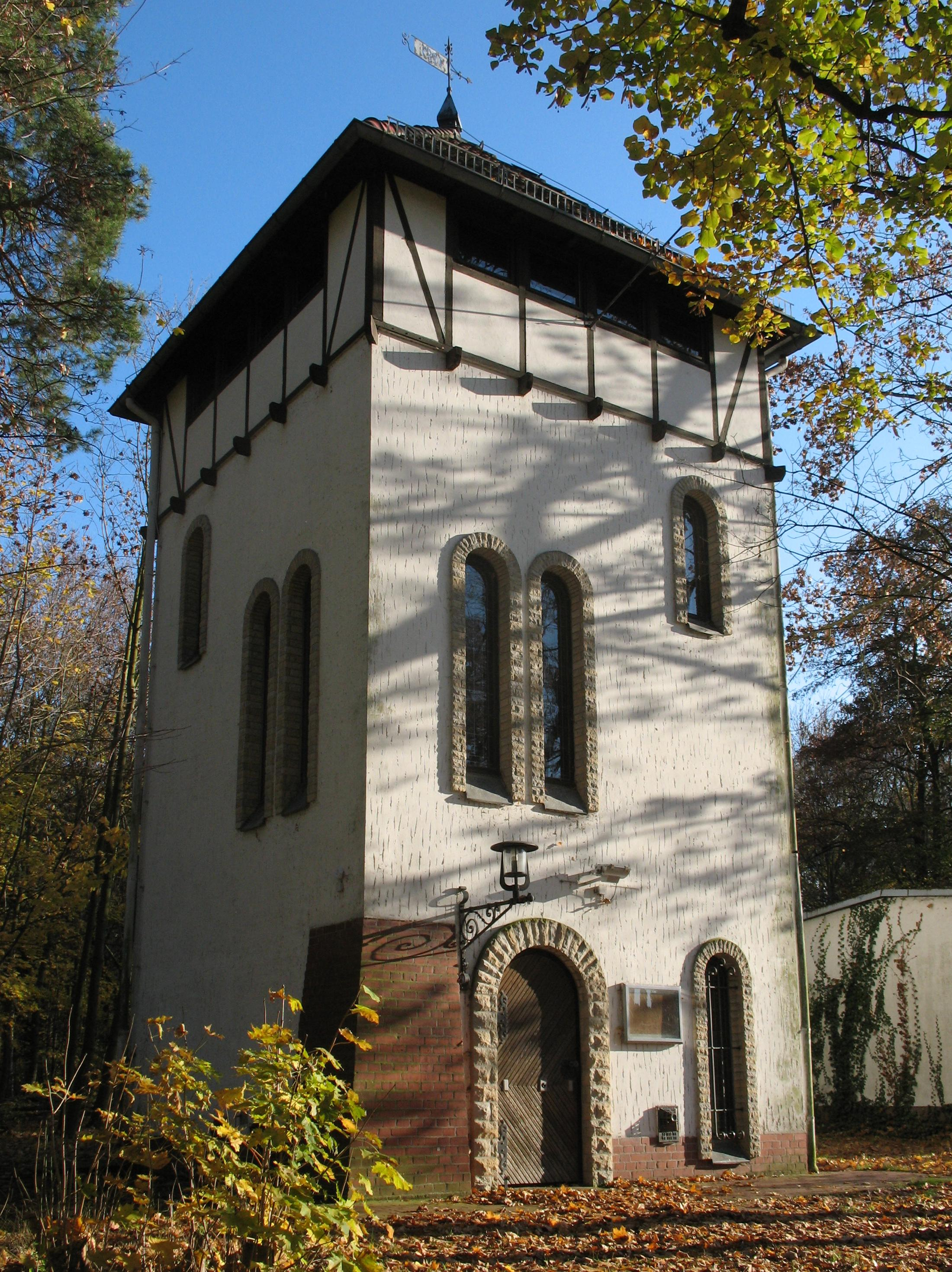
Wendenturm

The Müggelsee (German pronunciation: [ˈmʏɡl̩ˌzeː]), also known as the Großer Müggelsee, is a natural lake in the eastern edge of Berlin, the capital city of Germany. It is the largest of the Berlin lakes by area, with an area of 7.4 square kilometres (2.9 sq mi), a length of 4.3 kilometres (2.7 mi)

The lake is in the Berlin district of Treptow-Köpenick. The suburbs of Köpenick, Friedrichshagen, Rahnsdorf and a little section of Müggelheim border on the lake.

The lake itself is 8 metres (26 ft) deep at its deepest point. At its south end are hills called the 'Müggelberge', which are 115 metres (377 ft) high; they were formed during the Pleistocene (as a kettle hole, remaining at Weichselian glaciation). On the so-called 'Kleiner Müggelberg', the much-visited and popular 'Müggelturm' (a tower) was built, the first one in 1889 (destroyed in a fire in 1958), and the current one in 1960/61. The tower offers extensive views over the lake and the forests against the Berlin skyline.

The River Spree flows into the lake via the smaller Kleiner Müggelsee, which is only 0.16 square kilometres (0.062 sq mi) in area. The Friedrichshagen waterworks on the northern bank of the Müggelsee obtains most of its water from the lake. There are also numerous deep wells located near the banks, and are mainly fed by the bank filtrate and only to a small share by groundwater.

== Etymology ==
The first uses of the word component "Müggel" are, according to Gerhard Schlimpert in the "Codex diplomaticus Brandenburgensis", in 1394 as "den Tyns in der Miggel" and in 1487 as "von der Miggelseh". The etymology remains unclear. The traditional derivative from Common Slavonic mogyla = "grave, grave hill, earth hill" is rejected by Schlimpert as not durable. A pre-Slavonic, Germanic origin from a Proto-Indo-European root is more probable: migh-, mighla = "fog, cloud": compare Dutch miggelen = "drizzle" belongs. Analyses say that the word component "heim" in the name was brought around 1750 by settlers from the Palatinate from their homeland Odernheim, according to Schlimpert.

== Namesakes ==
In December 2013, a lake on the Saturnian moon Titan was officially named after Lake Müggelsee by the International Astronomical Union. That lake is composed of liquid methane and ethane, and is located at 84°26N and 203°30W on Titan's globe.
