= BVG Class F =

Large profile electric train

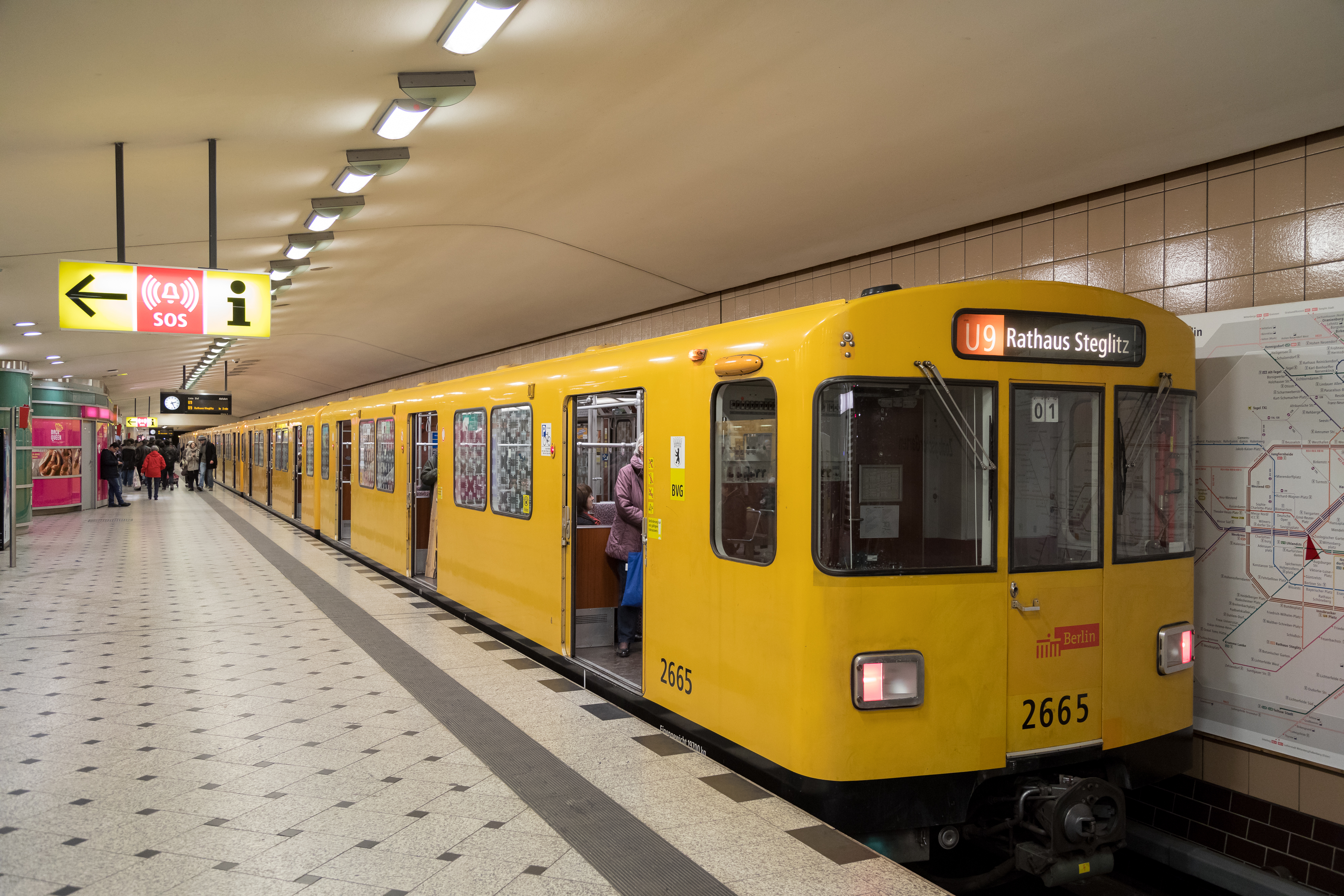
- An F79 train at Zoologischer Garten on the U9

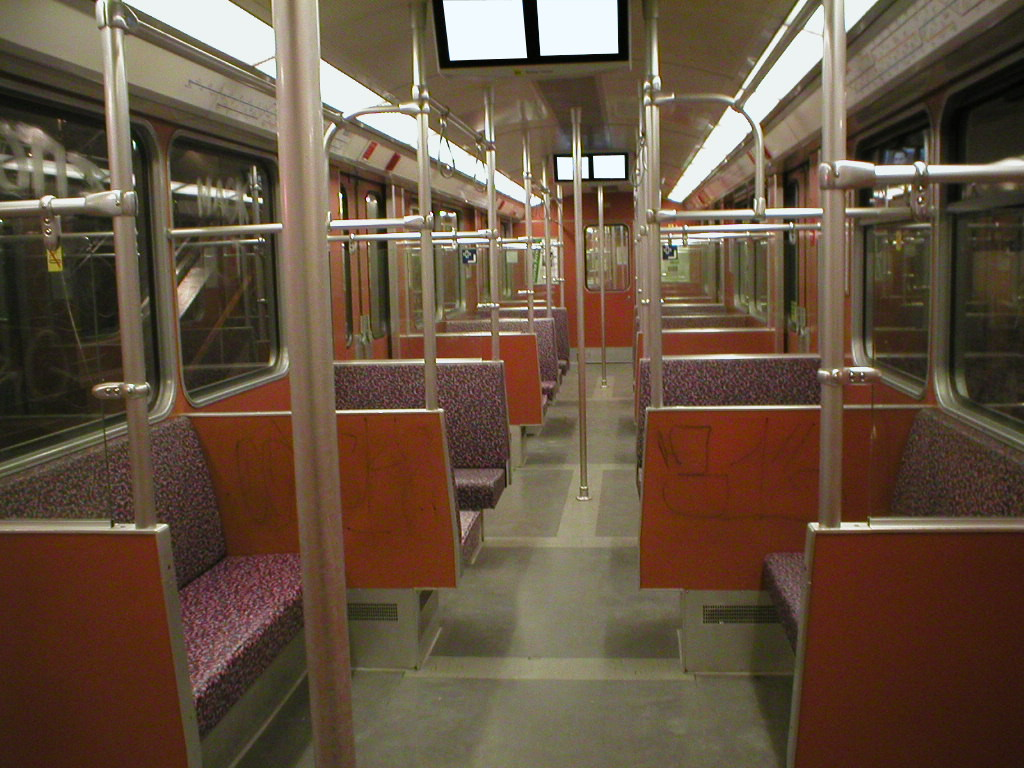
- Interior of an F87 train (before refurbishment)
- In service: 1973–present
- Manufacturers: ABB Henschel, Adtranz, AEG, Orenstein & Koppel, Siemens, Waggon Union
- Constructed: 1973–1994
- Entered service: 1974 (F74); 1976 (F76); 1980 (F79.1); 1979 (F79.2); 1980 (F79.3); 1984 (F84); 1986 (F87); 1990 (F90); 1992 (F92)
- Refurbished: 2012–2018 (F74); 2015–2018 (F76); 2009 (several F79); early 2000s (F84 and F87)
- Scrapped: 2018–2021 (F79.1, F79.2); 2004–2008 (F79.3)
- Number built: 257
- Number in service: 208
- Number preserved: 3
- Number scrapped: 46; 5 F74; 1 F76; 17 F79.1; 19 F79.2; 4 F79.3
- Formation: Double units
- Fleet numbers: 2500/01–2554/55 (F74); 2556/57–2636/37 (F76); 2638/39–2670/71 (F79.1); 2672/73–2710/11 (F79.2); 2712/13–2722/23 (F79.3); 2724/25–2800/01 (F84); 2802/03–2842/43 (F87); 2844/45–2902/03 (F90); 2904/05–3012/13 (F92)
- Capacity: 235 (F74, F76); 250 (F79.1, F79.2); 246 (F79.3); 244 (F84–F92)
- Operator: Berliner Verkehrsbetriebe
- Lines served: U5, U6, U7, U8 and U9

Specifications
- Car body construction: Aluminium
- Train length: 32.1 m (105 ft 3 3/4 in) (over anticlimbers)
- Width: 2.65 m (8 ft 8 5/16 in)
- Height: 3.425 m (11 ft 2 13/16 in)
- Doors: 12 side doors per unit (6 per side)
- Maximum speed: 72 kilometres per hour (45 mph)
- Weight: F74: 38,100 kg (83,996 lb); F76: 37,800 kg (83,335 lb); F79.1 and F79.2: 39,400 kg (86,862 lb); F79.3: 42,600 kg (93,917 lb); F84: 43,100 kg (95,019 lb); F87: 42,700 kg (94,137 lb); F90 and F92: 41,100 kg (90,610 lb)
- Prime mover: Electric motor
- Electric system: 750 V DC third rail
- Current collection: Contact shoe
- Safety systems: Dead man's switch, Magnetic train stop
- Coupling system: Scharfenberg

The BVG Class F is a train type designed for the large profile routes on the Berlin U-Bahn. 257 units (each consisting of two cars) were constructed between 1973 and 1994 in seven batches. These batches differ in terms of design and technical equipment.

The prototype unit 2500/01 underwent testing from 1973 on. After successful trial runs, regular production started the year after. 112 double units (batches F74 to F79) were delivered to West Berlin until the end of 1981, replacing the remainder of the pre-war Class C. 145 additional units, featuring various improvements, were built between 1984 and 1994 and partly replaced trains from the former East Berlin network after the German reunification.

Built from 1995 to 2002, the BVG Class H became the successor of the Class F. The remaining Class F trains are being replaced by new Class J trains starting from 2026.

== Construction ==
The cars feature a simple design and are made of light metal. They are easily recognizable by their rectangular headlights and (excluding the F74) distinguishable from their predecessors (BVG Class D) by the modified front design with larger windshields and wipers. They are a constructive improvement of the Class DL light metal trains. This allows for a high maximum acceleration of up to 1.5 m/s^{2} (3.4 mph/s).

As mentioned before, there are differences between the nine batches in terms of technical components and design: Only the F74, being the first batch, basically uses the same front design as its Class D predecessors, only using a different type of headlights, which also differs from the headlight type of all succeeding batches. While all F74 and F76 were equipped with rollsigns, the F79 was the first batch to make use of split-flap displays that featured different colours for the respective lines and also displayed their number. The F84 and F87 units were equipped with these displays as well. The F90 and F92 were the first batches to feature wider rollsigns; all F79, F84 and F87 were re-equipped with this type of rollsigns in the 1990s as well as all F76 units that underwent refurbishment between 2015 und 2018.

Differing from all previous batches and classes the F84 to F92, built between 1984 and 1994, were the first BVG trains to feature sliding plug doors instead of pocket doors. This allows for a simpler car body construction and easier cleaning. Additionally, the front was slightly altered by using a different type of storm door with a black stripe connecting the front windows. The F84 unit 2770/71 was re-equipped with an open gangway in the early 1990s, in order to test this feature for the upcoming Class H trains.

The F trains are 20 centimetres (7.9 in) longer than their predecessors, allowing wider doors and cabs. Moreover they are the only Berlin U-Bahn class featuring transverse seating, with the exception of one Class H unit (5018) where transverse seating was implemented as an experiment.

The maximum velocity of all Class F units is 72 km/h (45 mph), however, the units equipped with three-phase propulsion (F79.3 to F92) were originally designed to reach 80 km/h (50 mph).

== Types ==
Usually the units are summarized as F-Schaltwerker (direct current propulsion) F74 to F79 and F-Drehstromer (three-phase propulsion) F84 to F92. An exception to this is the F79.3 batch that also featured three-phase propulsion, mainly to test this new technology for upcoming orders.

The F76 unit 2578/79 was the first underground train in Europe to feature an experimental three-phase propulsion. As this was never intended for long term service, the unit was re-equipped with a regular direct current propulsion in 1980.

All F74 and several F76 and F79 were equipped with LZB devices to allow automatic train operation that was in regular use on the U9 until 1993. After the final shutdown of LZB in 1998 the devices were removed from all cars, however, traces of the automatic operation (e. g. blind plugs where the departure buttons used to be) could still be found in the cabs many years later.

From 2009 to 2017 refurbished F79 units were in service on the U55 line (which became part of the extended U5 in December 2020), as two-car units were deemed sufficient for the short U55 that only featured three stations. These units were the first to receive extensive refurbishment and served as prototypes for a refurbishment program concerning all F74, F76 and F79.

All F84 and F87 already underwent a small refurbishment in the late 2000s, where the brown interior color was changed to the light grey of the F90 and F92. An exclusion is the F87 unit 2826/27, as this unit was mothballed for several years and was not refurbished before returning to service in 2013. Since the retirement of all A3L71 and F79 units, 2826/27 is the last U-Bahn train in Berlin to feature the classic brown interior.

== Refurbishment and modernization ==
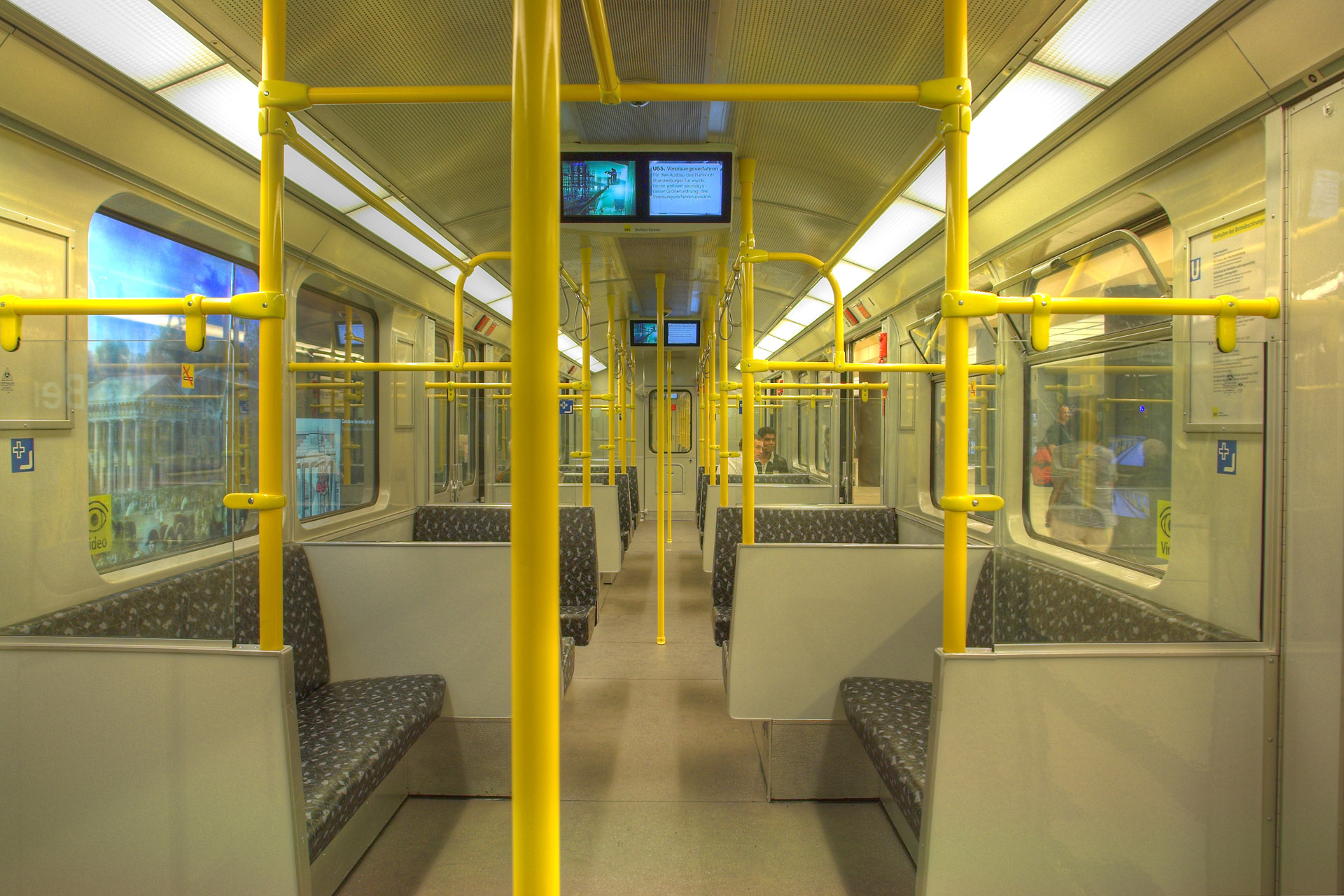
Interior of a refurbished F79 train

Only a few F-Schaltwerker were retired before 2012 (some after derailments or severe defects), however, the oldest cars were approaching the end of their life cycle. As the order of the Class H was already cut down from 115 to 46 trains a few years earlier for financial reasons, it was obvious that no new trains were to replace the Class F trains over the next years.

Already in 2006, the first Class F unit (2500/01) was dismantled to receive material samples in order to judge the feasibility of a modernization. As the car bodies turned out to be in a good condition, all remaining F74 and F76 units underwent an extensive modernization and refurbishment program between 2011 and 2018. The interior was painted white with yellow handrails, now also offering space for strollers and wheelchairs. The seat pads were changed to the modern black BVG design. Additionally, all units that underwent the modernization after summer 2015 were re-equipped with a new seat type also used in the new Class IK. The door handles were replaced by buttons and new driver seats were installed.

The first modernized F74 entered service in June 2012. During the first months of service several technical issues were discovered, especially when operating only with other modernized units. After the issues were resolved, regular operation resumed in December 2012. All modernized units remain fully compatible to non-modernized Class F trains.

The modernized units are called F74E and F76E, but can be summarized as FE as the two batches are now nearly identical to each other, excluding the front design. The last F74E entered service in September 2018, the F76 modernization was finished by the beginning of 2018 already. 63 units were modernized in total.

Originally the F79 were to undergo this program as well. However, it was later decided to exclude them from the modernization as their general condition was deemed too bad (see: Retirement). Some units were equipped with new seats and the door mechanics were adapted to the new door mechanics used in the FE units (excluding the replacement of the handles), while others were scrapped without any changes.

Starting in early 2020, all F76E were being re-equipped with LED tail lights. All remaining F units are to follow. It is not planned to extend the modernization program onto the later-built F-Drehstromer series as these are to be replaced by the new class J, which is expected to enter service in 2023. One F90 unit (2886/87) was equipped with LED destination signs in 2020.

== Service ==
When they entered service, the F74 and F76 were mainly assigned to the U9 as for their ability to operate under LZB. The F79 first entered service on the U7 where it was mostly replaced later by the F84 to F92. They were usually not used on the U6 and U8 as these lines operated partly under East Berlin territory - only the older Class D cars were assigned to these lines. After the reunification of Berlin and Germany itself, the F trains quickly entered service on the U6 and U8 as well, the latter even being assigned the newest F90 and F92 trains.

Later on, the F-Drehstromer were moved to the U6 and U7, replacing most of the F79 on the latter. The F-Schaltwerker were then assigned to the U5, U8 and U9, both has not changed until today. However there are rare occasions of F-Drehstromer units operating on the U8 or U9 just as F-Schaltwerker on the U6 and U7 from time to time. Until 2018 some F79 were still regularly operating on the U6 and U7 as they were equipped with passenger counting systems.

The Class F cannot operate on the lines U1 to U4, as these are part of the Kleinprofil (small profile) network. However, the small profile classes A3L82 and A3L92 share similarities with the younger F batches. Additionally, the F-Drehstromer trains have - as of 2022 - never operated in passenger service on the U5. An often cited reason for this is that their three-phase propulsion could interfere with the Berlin S-Bahn signal system at Wuhletal station, where the U-Bahn and S-Bahn share platforms - however, this is regularly dismissed as a myth.

== Retirement ==
All F79.3 were retired between 1999 and 2003 as spare parts for the early three-phase propulsion became harder to obtain, increasing maintenance costs. Two units are preserved as training vehicles for the Berlin fire department and are stored in an unused tunnel near Jungfernheide station. After that, only a few F74 and one F76 were pulled from service and subsequently scrapped in next few years after derailments and/or severe defects. As mentioned under Refurbishment and Modernization, the F prototype 2500/01 was dismantled in 2006 in preparation for a later modernization of the other units.

While the modernization of the F74 and F76 was still ongoing, it was discovered in 2015 that the F79 series suffered from structural defects, allowing only for eight more years of service and only if the units underwent repairs. The planned modernization was subsequently cancelled. The units that underwent repair were to receive a simplified modernization with the new seats known from the Class IK and the F76E and door pneumatics adapted to those of the FE trains (without replacing the handles by buttons though). However, during the repairs the damages were found to be more severe than expected, leaving an even shorter remaining lifespan. As a consequence, the simplified modernization was halted and the technical supervisory authority of Berlin ordered to retire all F79 from 2019. By 2018 22 of 35 units were already pulled from service, stripped for spare components and subsequently scapped as a result of their excessive structural damage. The last F79 unit (2710/11) was retired in October 2021.

All F74E and F76E as well as F84 to F92 remain in service until being replaced by the new class J trains. One F74E was permanently taken out of service in 2021 after hitting a buffer stop while shunting.

Unit 2700/01 (F79) is on display at the German Museum of Technology since 2021, with car 2700 being restored into its 1994 condition and car 2701 representing its last service condition.
