= BVG Class E =

Series of Berlin subway units

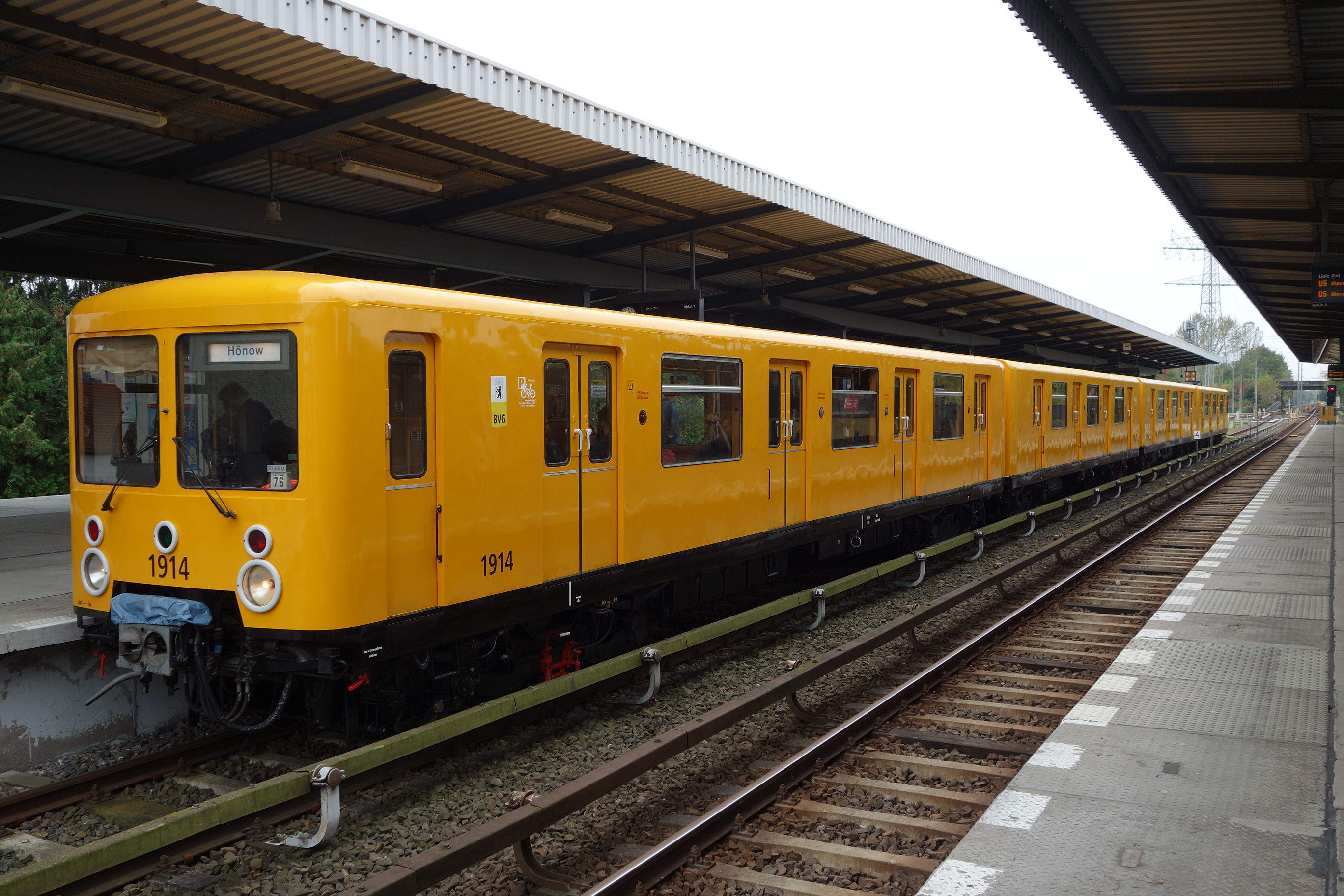
- Class E train at Biesdorf-Süd station in October 2017
- In service: 1960–1994
- Replaced: BVG Class C
- Constructed: 1956–1990
- Entered service: 1960
- Successor: BVG Class F BVG Class H
- Formation: 4 cars per set
- Operator: Berliner Verkehrsbetriebe

Specifications
- Doors: 4 pairs per side (per car)
- Electric systems: 750 V DC third rail
- Current collection: Contact shoe
- Coupling system: Scharfenberg
- Track gauge: 1,435 mm (4 ft 8 1/2 in)

The BVG Class E was a series of Großprofil (wide profile) multiple units of the Berliner Verkehrsbetriebe (BVG) which was exclusively used on the East Berlin line E, today line U5 of the Berlin U-Bahn. Except for the two prototypes, all vehicles were built using parts of retired S-Bahn vehicles, namely the bogies and parts of the electrical equipment.

== History ==
As part of the German reparations after World War II, the Berliner Verkehrsbetriebe had to cede 120 vehicles of Class C to the Moscow Metro. This type was of particular interest to Moscow as it was the newest class on the Berlin network, and technically very similar to the Moscow class A which had been modeled after it.

Hence, a shortage of rolling stock of class E (in the Soviet sector, later East Berlin) was the newest wide profile line which had been operated exclusively with Class C stock. To continue services of this route, Kleinprofil (narrow profile) vehicles of Class AI were transferred from route U2 and had wooden running boards, popularly called Blumenbretter ("flower shelves"), attached to their sides. These trains were designated AI K. 40 trains were being re-deployed to route E. These "Blumenbretter" trains were also deployed on route D during the East German uprising of 1953.

As a continued operation of narrow profile cars on the wide profile line was economically not viable in the long run, BVG commissioned a new class, later designated E, for Berlin U-Bahn. Only the subtypes EI (prototype) and EIII (converted S-Bahn vehicles) were built. Most of the trains were built using parts of DRG Class ET 165, DRG Class ET 168 and DRG Class ET 169.

== EI trains ==
Prototypes of a new class of U-Bahn trains were drawn up beginning in 1952, and after the West Berlin BVG was permitted to take exact measurements and detailed photographs of one of their Class C vehicles in 1954, LOWA in Ammendorf designed and built two new motor cars from 1955 to 1957. Until 1956 these were simply known as 18-Meter-Wagen (18 metre cars), after consultation with the BVG West who developed their Class D at the same time as Class E. The electrical equipment was supplied and installed by LEW Hennigsdorf.

The new vehicles were a steel frame construction with a rounded roof and four double sliding doors for passengers on each side. There were also doors for the driver and escape doors at the non-driving ends. Instead of ventilation flaps in the windows, pressure ventilation was used. Each car had four motors of 100 kW each, rheostatic brakes and electrically controlled pneumatic brakes. Scharfenberg couplers were used, and the vehicles were equipped with multiple unit traction control.

Because of the steel construction, the vehicles weighed almost 40 tonnes each and were, therefore, heavier than those of Class C. This and various other shortcomings were the reason why no production models of those trains were built. Although the RAW in Schöneweide was tasked with fixing some of the faults and building two matching trailers, a lack of capacity prevented this, and the vehicles were stabled in 1961. One was later used as a storage room, the other as a mess room for apprentices. In late 1988, both cars were scrapped.

== EII trains ==
While the Class EI was designed and built, BVG already planned an improved Class EII as a lightweight construction based on the experiences with the prototypes and with the Class D. Waggonbau Ammendorf was tasked with the design on 18 February 1959. The dimensions differed only little from those of the vehicles of the Moscow Metro, signifying plans to export such cars. After the border to West Berlin was closed on 13 August 1961, the traffic flows in Berlin changed such that passenger numbers on Route A significantly increased, and the vehicles transferred to route E were now missing on the narrow profile route. Hence, the plans for an EII type train were dropped in 1962. A faster and easier option was the conversion of S-Bahn vehicles which had become surplus to demand because of the boycott of the S-Bahn in West Berlin. This resulted in the numerous Class EIII.

== EIII trains ==
=== Batch 1 ===
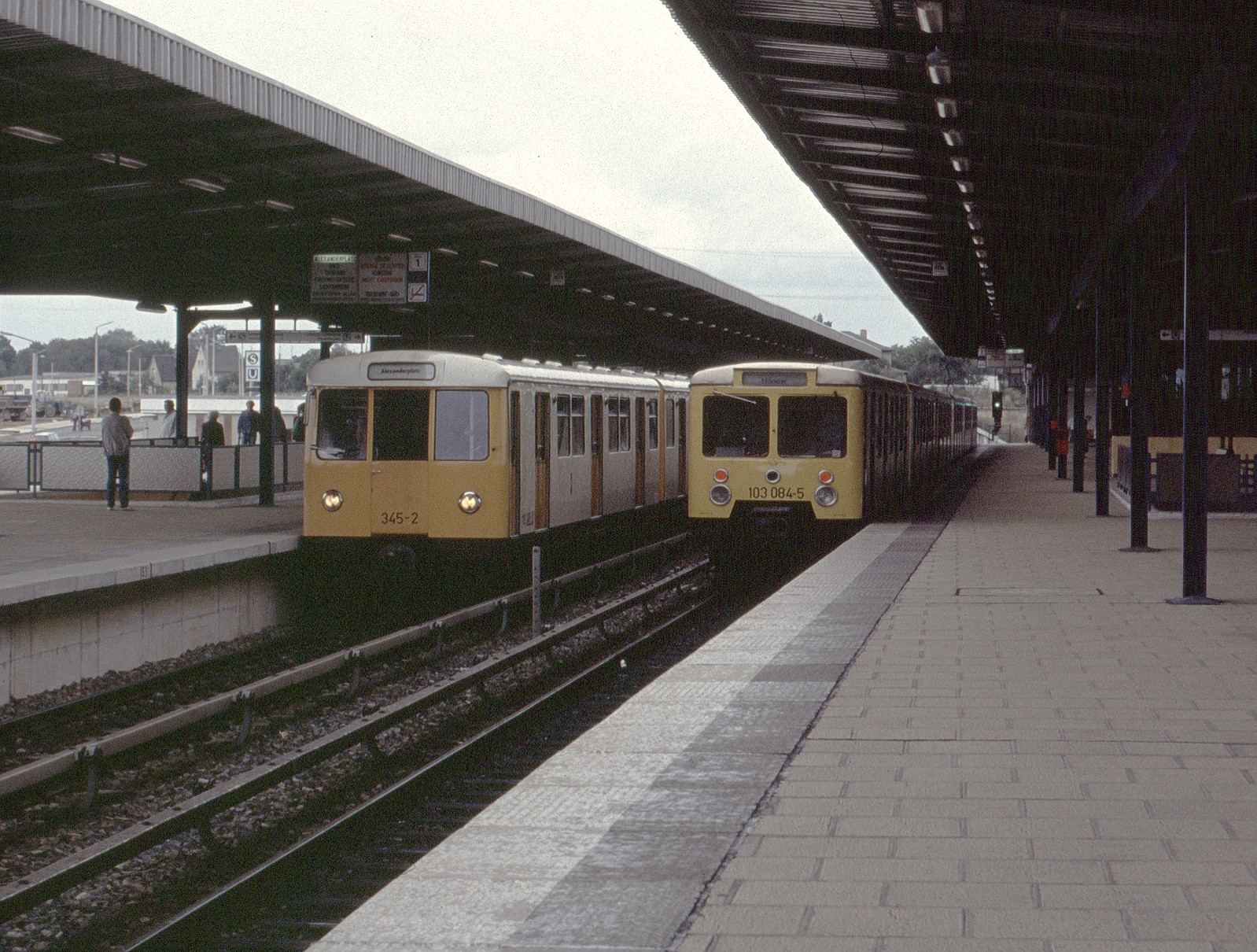
103 084 (right) Class D in Wuhletal, 1990

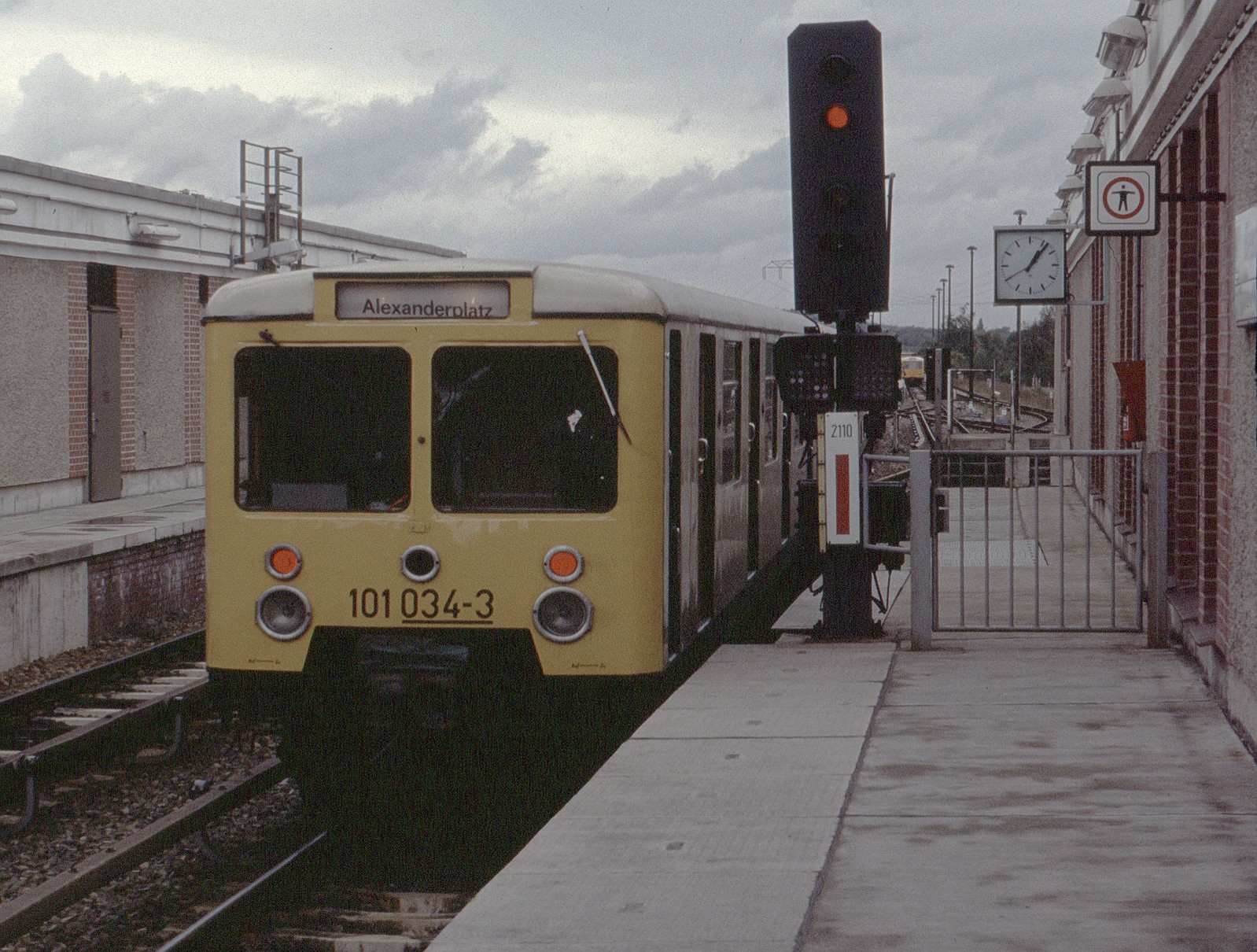
101 034 in Biesdorf-Süd, 1990

Vehicle Overview EIII, 1. Lieferserie
Number (bef 1970)	Number (aft 1970)	Number (aft 1992)	Dispensed Trains
1410/1411	101 002/151 003	1802/1803	ET 168 009/EB 168 009
1412/1413	101 004/151 005	1804/1805	ET 168 022/EB 168 002
1414/1415	101 006/151 007	1806/1807	ET 168 037/EB 168 037
1416/1417	101 008/151 009	1808/1809	ET 168 036/EB 168 036
1418/1419	101 010/151 011	1810/1811	ET 168 031/EB 168 031
1420/1421	101 012/151 013	1812/1813	ET 168 042/EB 168 029
1422/1423	101 014/151 015	1814/1815	ET 168 046/EB 168 042
1424/1425	101 016/151 017	1816/1817	ET 168 028/EB 168 028
1426/1427	101 018/151 019	1818/1819	ET 168 018/EB 168 018
1428/1429	101 020/151 021	1820/1821	ET 168 019/EB 168 019
1430/1431	101 022/151 023	1822/1823	ET 168 040/EB 168 040
1432/1433	101 024/151 025	1824/1825	ET 168 047/EB 168 047
1434/1435	101 026/151 027	1826/1827	ET 168 044/EB 168 044
1436/1437	101 028/151 029	1828/1829	ET 168 024/EB 168 024
1438/1439	101 030/151 031	1830/1831	ET 168 020/EB 168 020
1440/1441	101 032/151 033	1832/1833	ET 168 007/EB 168 012
1442/1443	101 034/151 035	1834/1835	ET 168 001/EB 168 001
1444/1445	101 036/151 037	1836/1837	ET 168 017/EB 168 017
1446/1447	101 038/151 039	1838/1839	ET 168 021/EB 168 021
1448/1449	101 040/151 041	1840/1841	ET 165 419/EB 165 419
1450/1451	101 042/151 043	1842/1843	ET 165 038/EB 165 038
1452/1453	101 044/151 045	1844/1845	ET 165 037/EB 165 037

The project began in the summer of 1962. Six trains of the S-Bahn type 168 were converted in the Reichsbahnausbesserungswerk Schöneweide (RAW) until the end of 1962. All in all, five batches of this new U-Bahn train type, called EIII, were delivered.

=== Batch 2 ===
Vehicle Overview EIII, 2. Lieferserie
Number (bef 1970)	Number (aft 1970)	Number (aft 1992)	Dispensed Trains
1454/1455	102 050/152 051	1850/1851	ET 169 031a
1456/1457	102 052/152 053	1852/1853	ET 169 013b
1458/1459	102 054/152 055	1854/1855	ET 169 010a
1460/1461	102 056/152 057	1856/1857	ET 169 010b
1462/1463	102 058/152 059	1858/1859	ET 169 008a
1464/1465	102 060/152 061	1860/1861	ET 169 008b
1466/1467	102 062/152 063	1862/1863	ET 169 002a
1468/1469	102 064/152 065	1864/1865	ET 169 002b
1470/1471	102 066/152 067	1866/1867	ET 169 006a
1472/1473	102 068/152 069	1868/1869	ET 169 006b
1474/1475	102 070/152 071	1870/1871	ET 169 016a
1476/1477	102 072/152 073	1872/1873	ET 169 016b
1478/1479	102 074/152 075	1874/1875	ET 169 015a
1480/1481	102 076/152 077	1876/1877	ET 169 015b

The Kleinprofil trains could finally be moved back from the E line to the A line, which sorely needed the trains due to a very large number of passengers on the segment between Schönhauser Allee and Alexanderplatz.

The fleet numbering system was changed from 14xx to 10x (Triebwagen) and 15x (Beiwagen) series for the trains.

=== Batch 3 ===
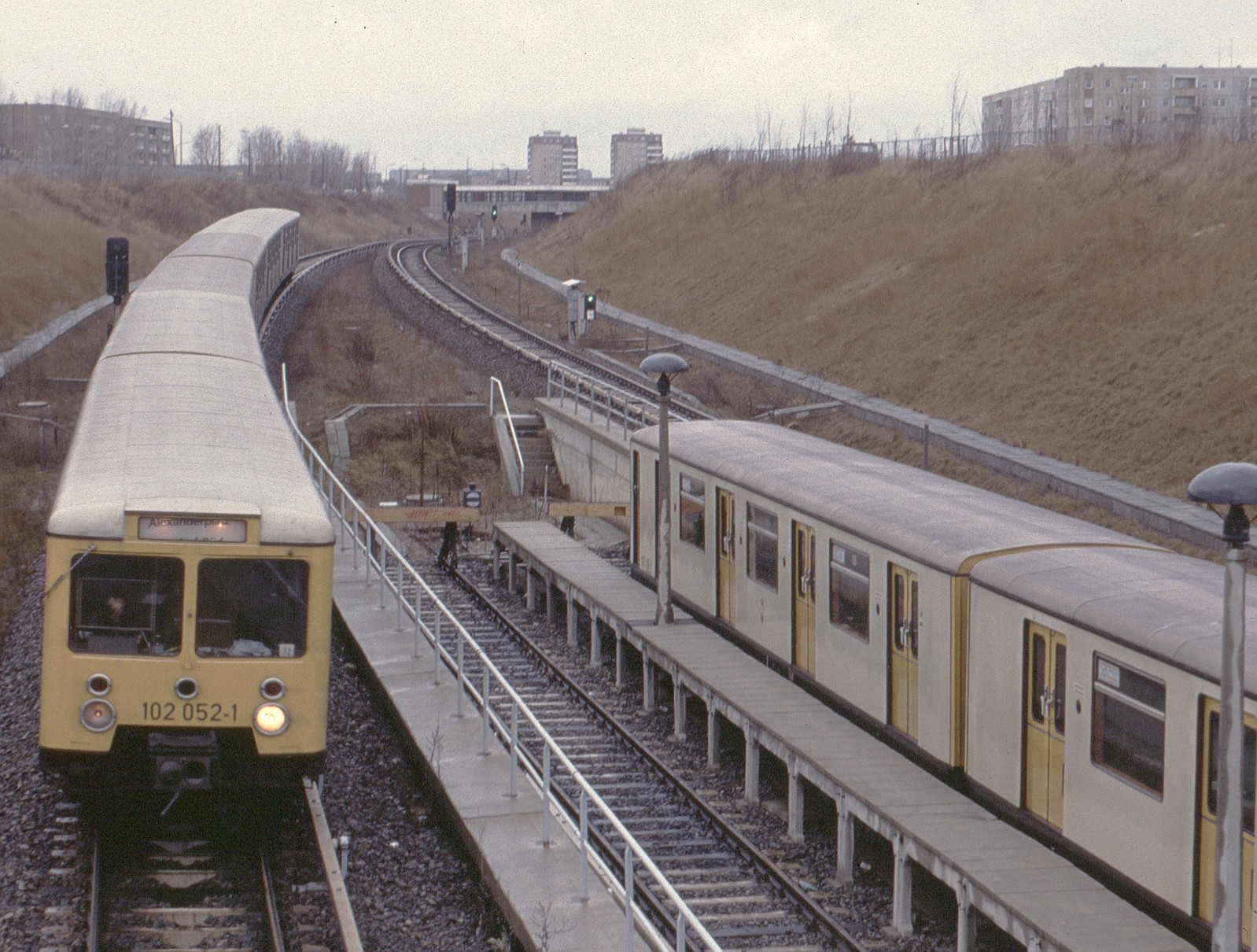
102 052 (left), 1991

Vehicle Overview EIII, 3. Lieferserie
Number (aft 1970)	Number (aft 1992)	Dispensed Trains
103 080/153 081	1880/1881	275 837/275 838
103 082/153 083	1882/1883	275 839/275 840
103 084/153 085	1884/1885	275 849/275 850
103 086/153 087	1886/1887	275 835/275 836

Construction began for the extension of Line E from Friedrichsfelde to Tierpark, to serve the Tierpark zoo there. To increase the capacity for the extension, the BVB had to get 4 trains from the DR Class 275. These trains were converted between 9 September 1972 and 25 January 1973.

=== Batch 4 ===
Vehicle Overview EIII/4
Number (bis 1970)	Number (ab 1970)	Dispensed Trains
104 090/154 091	1890/1891	275 671/275 672
104 092/154 093	1892/1893	275 759/275 760
104 094/154 095	1894/1895	275 217/275 218
104 096/154 097	1896/1897	275 795/275 796
104 097/154 099	1898/1899	275 823/275 824

After the opening of the Tierpark station, there was a need to increase capacity on Line E. Therefore, the BVB had to convert five more trains which is from the DR Class 275. These trains were delivered between 1975 and 1982.

=== Batch 5 ===
Vehicle Overview EIII/5
Number (bef 1992)	Number (aft 1992)	Dispensed Trains
105 100/155 101	1900/1901	275 613/275 614
105 102/155 103	1902/1903	275 035/275 036
105 104/155 105	1904/1905	275 077/275 406
105 106/155 107	1906/1907	275 445/275 446
105 108/155 109	1908/1909	275 229/275 230
105 110/155 111	1910/1911	275 549/275 550
105 112/155 113	1912/1913	275 957/275 670
105 114/155 115	1914/1915	275 197/275 198
105 116/155 117	1916/1917	275 827/275 372
105 118/155 119	1918/1919	275 497/275 498
105 120/155 121	1920/1921	275 329/275 330
105 122/155 123	1922/1923	275 821/275 960
105 124/155 125	1924/1925	275 321/275 322
105 126/155 127	1926/1927	275 139/275 140
105 128/155 129	1928/1929	275 359/275 360
105 130/155 131	1930/1931	275 607/275 820
105 132/155 133	1932/1933	275 065/275 066
105 134/155 135	1934/1935	275 657/275 448
105 136/155 137	1936/1937	275 731/275 554
105 138/155 139	1938/1939	275 829/275 830
105 140/155 141	1940/1941	275 079/275 080
105 142/155 143	1942/1943	275 145/275 146
105 144/155 145	1944/1945	275 159/275 160
105 146/155 147	1946/1947	275 463/275 464
105 148/155 149	1948/1949	275 089/275 090
105 150/155 151	1950/1951	275 101/275 102
105 152/155 153	1952/1953	275 123/275 124
105 154/155 155	1954/1955	275 207/275 208
105 156/155 157	1956/1957	275 055/275 056
105 158/155 159	1958/1959	275 523/275 524
105 160/155 161	1960/1961	275 211/275 212
105 162/155 163	1962/1963	275 825/275 826
105 164/155 165	1964/1965	275 029/275 030
105 166/155 167	1966/1967	275 789/275 790
105 168/155 169	1968/1969	275 259/275 260
105 170/155 171	1970/1971	275 447/275 553
105 172/155 173	1972/1973	275 017/275 018
105 174/155 175	1974/1975	275 367/275 368
105 176/155 177	1976/1977	275 409/275 410
105 178/155 179	1978/1979	275 349/275 350
105 180/155 181	1980/1981	277 293/275 644

The BVB needed to order new trains because of the extension of line E from Tierpark to the Hellersdorf area and Hönow. It had contracted several trains from the Berlin S-Bahn and those selected D57/D60 units from the BVG which was originally destined to be scrapped. The first two prototypes started delivery in May 1986 before the subsequent delivery in September 1986. The condition was later reversed. For safety reasons, the ceilings of the manufacturer plate were given after the trains were burnt out at the Klosterstraße station. 25 double-end cars were also added to the fleet for the D class trains, whereas the remainder of 41 were on Line E. The last of these trains were delivered before September 1990, just before Die Wende.

== EIV trains ==
The GDR or the BVB had already planned further. Although it had developed over 40 years, many parts of these trains came mostly from S-Bahn trains which were built in the 1920s and the 1930s and thus were very old. On the other hand, enormous efforts have been made by the industry to develop a modern S-Bahn train. This then succeeded so well with the DR Class 270 (now DBAG Class 485), which was produced in the years 1987 to 1992 for the Deutsche Reichsbahn. In LEW Hennigsdorf in the 1980s, there were already plans for a new subway train for the large profile line E as the successor to the E-III trains. They had dimensioned the timeframe so that the mid-90s should have started with the delivery of these thoroughly modern trains. These trains were to be installed with AC drive, among other things, which would have been a novelty for local trains in the GDR. Design studies for this new type of train were abandoned in 1990.

== Accidents ==
Over the years, the EIII has repeatedly suffered minor accidents and damage. In addition, there were four major accidents in the period from 1972 to 1992, although, as a rule, only property damage arose.

In March 1972 there was a rear-end collision in the Lichtenberg subway station, the train 101 040 was damaged. It was rebuilt until 1974 at RAW Schöneweide.

On 13 January 1980, the traction truck 101 escaped in the sweeping station at the Alexanderplatz subway station. The car was rebuilt in March 1980 in RAW Schöneweide and derailed again in January 1981 at the same place. Reconstruction took place until December 1982 in the context of a major investigation.

On 21 October 1992, there was a rear-end collision between the Kaulsdorf-Nord and Berlin Wuhletal stations involving DI cars 110 318 and the EIII car 101 015/151 015. As the retirement of the EIII/4 had already been decided soon, the vehicle was not rebuilt.

== After reunification ==
In 1992, when the BVB was re-unified with the BVG (West) to form the BVG, the trains were progressively renumbered from 10x and 15x into 18xx and 19xx. Most of the trains were also serviced in the Wannsee depot in the meantime before transferring to the reunified Deutsche Bahn on 1 January 1994. The management board of the BVG decided to replace the EIII cars in the new millennium with the new Class F cars.

This allowed phasing out of the trains to target those beyond EIII.4 cars. According to some sources, some trains were to be sold to the Warsaw Metro after the retirement, but these plans did not materialise. This would also be a modernisation of the trains such that trains will have BOStrab. The vehicles had received no major studies, the last unit 1818/1819 left on 11 January 1993 from the RAW in this state.

Originally, the BVG wanted to keep the EIII trains until 1999, but because of enormous operating and maintenance costs after the reunification of Germany, the EIII trains were retired as early as 1994. There were plans to use up the EIII/4 of the lifespan until 1995, and the EIII/5 and EIII/5U until 2000. Since the necessary spare vehicles for Class F were not ready, the BVG proceeded to redeploy more trains to the U8 and reduce the number of trains of U5, until the Class H trains were delivered.

The trains were not designed for use in magnetically secured routes. Some of the aspects include relatively sedate driving techniques. There had been attempts to test the EIII trains on other lines, however this failed. The actual last day of operation is 16 July 1994. The last trains were 1830/1831+1810/1811+1842/1843 and 1916/1917+1914/1915+1908/1909, running from Alexanderplatz to Hönow.
