= BVG Class A3 =

Train class

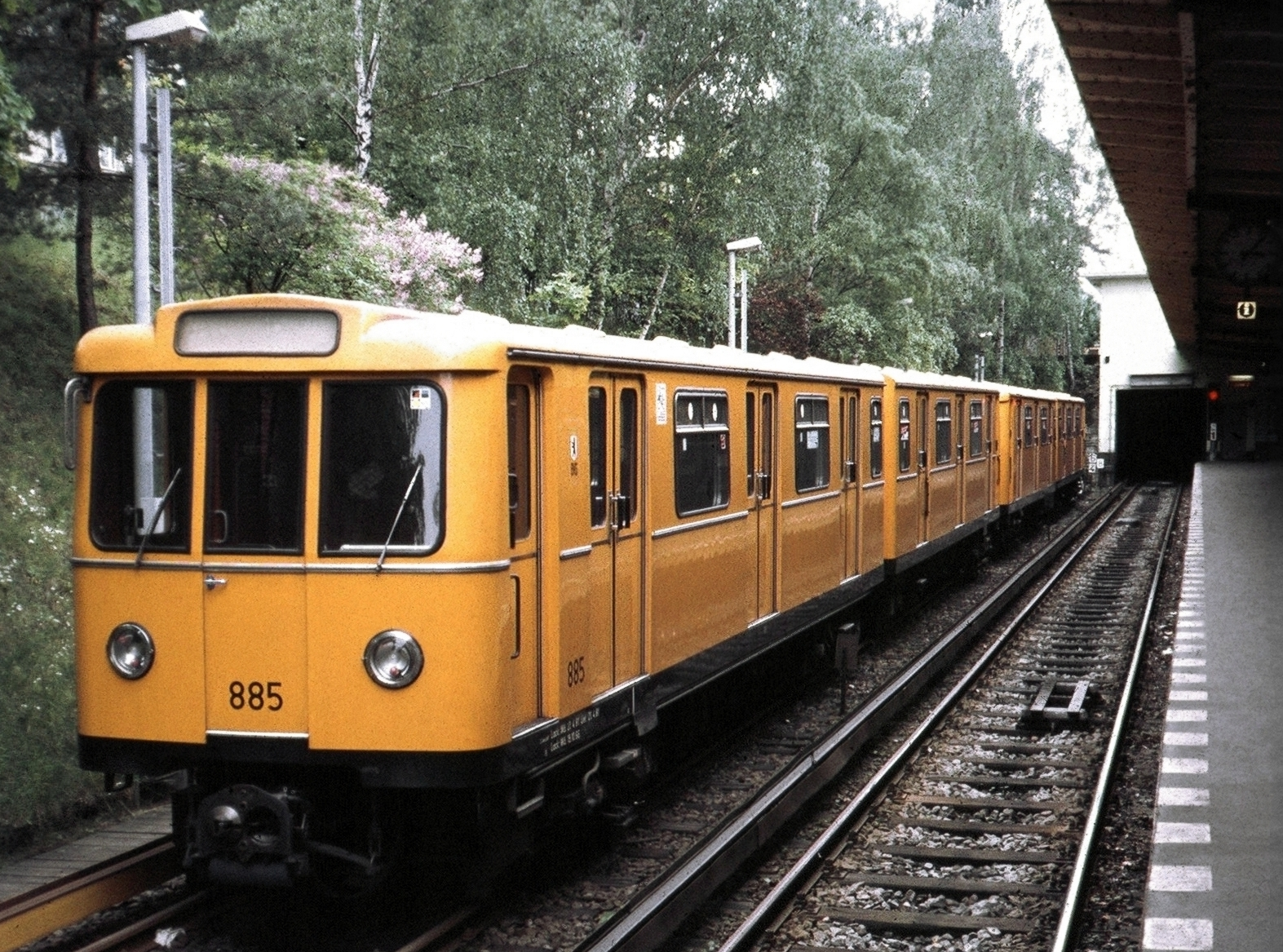
- Class A3 train at Krumme Lanke station in June 1987
- In service: 1960–present
- Manufacturers: ABB Henschel; AEG; Orenstein & Koppel; Siemens; Waggon Union
- Constructed: 1960–1994
- Entered service: 1960 (A3-60); 1964 (A3-64); 1966 (A3-66); 1966 (A3L66); 1967 (A3L67); 1971 (A3L71); 1982 (A3L82); 1992 (A3L92)
- Formation: Double units
- Operator: Berliner Verkehrsbetriebe
- Lines served: U1, U2, U3 & U4

Specifications
- Car body construction: Aluminium
- Train length: 25.66 m (84 ft 2 1/4 in) (over anticlimbers)
- Car length: 12.53 m (41 ft 1 5/16 in)
- Width: 2.3 m (7 ft 6 9/16 in)
- Height: 3.18 m (10 ft 5 3/16 in)
- Doors: 12 side doors per unit (6 per side)
- Maximum speed: 62 km/h (39 mph)
- Weight: 32,000 kg (70,548 lb); 41,100 kg (90,610 lb)
- Prime mover: Electric motor
- Electric system: 750 V DC third rail
- Current collection: Contact shoe
- Safety system: Dead man's switch
- Coupling system: Scharfenberg

The BVG Class A3 is a type of Kleinprofil train that was built after World War II. The smallest operationally mobile unit is the double-rail car, which consists of a control car (S-car) with a straight carriage number and a compressor car (K-car) with an odd car number. Both vehicles are motorized and each is equipped with a cab, the term "control car" refers to the local facilities for electrical control. The K-wagon contains the compressed air system, the converter system and the lighting equipment. The numbering was carried out by car 999/998 backwards, which 999/998 is the oldest A3 unit. The K-car was reserved for non-smokers until the late 1970s, while the S-car was permitted to allow smoking.

== A3 type cars ==
After World War II, a new batch of vehicles became necessary - the trains had been badly damaged in the war. As early as 1953, the BVG-West was busy with the construction of new large-profile trains, the later D series. After the first delivery in 1957, the transport companies worked together with Waggon Union on the construction of small-profile trains similar to the D-type series. The result was the A3, which largely matched the D trains except for the adjustments for the different profiles. The first vehicles were delivered in 1960, a total of eight double railcars designated as A3 60 substructure. These wagons were also among the few that drove to East Berlin before the construction of the Berlin Wall on August 13, 1961.

At this point, the new A3 type, modelled on its big Großprofil brother D, was designed. There were three batches of this type in the years 1960/61, 1964 and 1966. However, because these were built from steel, the new trains required a large amount of electricity.

Type	Series	Number	Fleet Size
A3-60	1960	984/985–998/999	16
A3-64	1964	934/935–982/983	50
A3-66	1966	892/893–932/933	42

In 1960, the A3-60 was deployed on Line B I and A I for a start. After the construction of the Berlin Wall, A3-60 trains were only allowed to run on Line B I (Schlesches Tor - Ruhleben). It used to run to Pankow until the Berlin Wall was built on 13 August 1961. The A3-64 was deployed on Line A III and A I again.

== A3L type cars ==
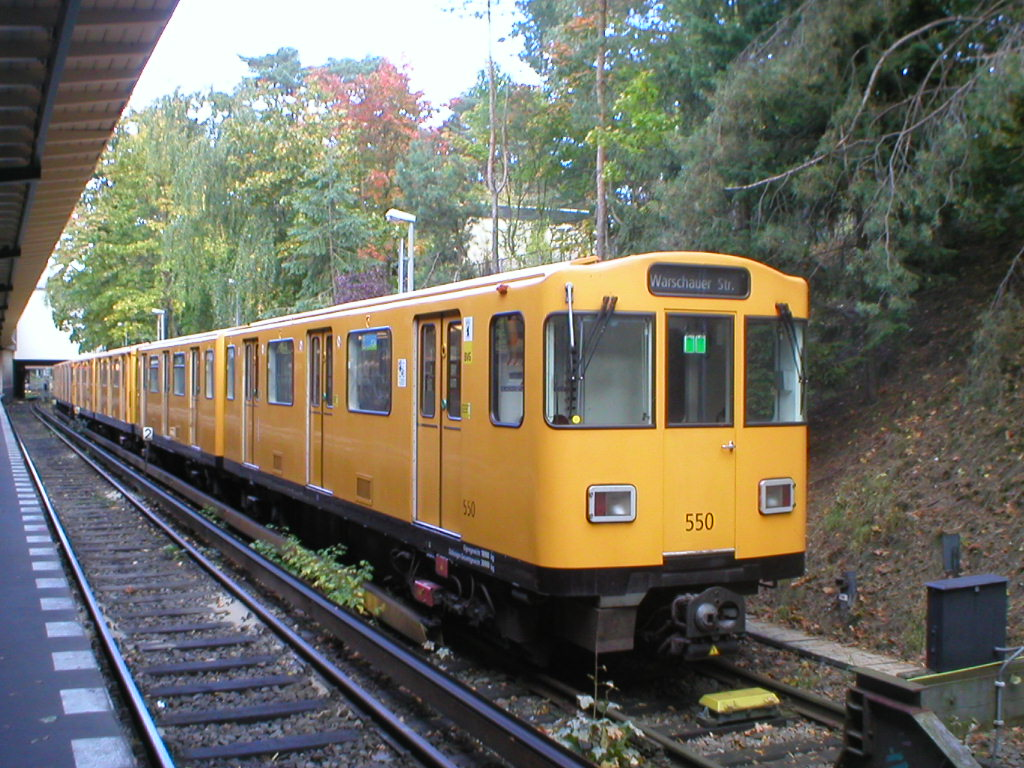
The updated design of the A3L

So, based on the A3, the A3L type built from aluminium was developed.

Type	Series	Numbers	Fleet Size
A3L66	1966	884/885–890/891	8
A3L67	1967	794/795–882/883	90
A3L71	1971	656/657–792/793	138
A3L82	1982	640/641–654/655	16
A3L92	1993-95	538/539–638/639	102

The first A3L66 train was deployed in 1966, and it replaced all the older train cars from 1906 to 1913, on the U2. These were replaced in 2000. Originally, the A3 and A3L twin-wagons bore all-round mouldings below the edges of the windows, all of which were removed in the late 1970s. The presence of the trims was not a criterion for the train composition, in the transitional period mixed trains occurred.

The second A3L67 train was deployed in 1967, and it replaced all the older A I train cars, on the U3 and U4. These were replaced in 2006. The aluminium car body had shown a series of wear and tear, so the upgrade would not have paid off.

The third batch of A3L71 trains was deployed in 1971, and it replaced all the older A II train cars, on the U2. In mid-2011, the BVG announced that from 2014 pre-series trains of a new series will be tested. These trains then replace the A3 / A3L series. Although currently (as of February 2016) only two preseries trains of this new IK series are delivered, which is expected to remain so until 2017, the first A3L71 cars had to be phased out in 2010 and 2015, since - similar to a few years ago for the A3L67 - the aluminium cars are now in such a bad condition that they could be refurbished at a great expense.

In 1982 the design was slightly modified, but remained compatible with the existing trains and could be used interchangeably with them. They were called A3L82. These were deployed on Line 1 (Schlesches Tor - Ruhleben). Originally they wanted to class them A4, but they still wanted to produce the A3L until 1996, and so the "A4" was eventually replaced by HK in 1999, made by Bombardier Transportation.

In the years 1993 to 1995, another new series of Kleinprofil trains were manufactured for the BVG, meant for their extra trains on line U1 and U2. After reunification, the two sections of the U2 had to be joined together again. As a result, the need for newer vehicles was once again created, and the BVG was already examining the first trains of the GI / 1 series due to technical defects. The resulting lack of vehicles could only be remedied by upgrading the G-cars on the one hand or procuring additional new vehicles on the other. Since the BVG originally wanted to separate from the GI / 1, she resorted to the latter measure. They were based on the A3L82 but were painted grey on the inside, unlike the earlier trains, which had wooden panelling. That was not the only change, however - they were the first Kleinprofil trains to use three-phase electric power. These trains were called A3L92. The first train, 566/567 was also retired at the same time.

In the summer of 2018, the BVG began decommissioning the A3L82, leaving two units (646/647 and 650/651) still in operation (only 14 units are decommissioned). The rest were parked in Grunewald and Friedrichsfelde and served only as spare parts donors. The last two units were retired in September 2018.

== Refurbishment ==
In 2002, the BVG started work on the refurbishment of the steel-body Class A3, after the Senate of Berlin turned down their request to fund more Class HK trains: the refurbishment project aimed to extend the lifespan of Class A3 by 20 years, and the aluminium-body Class A3L was excluded due to "structural fatigue". Between 2003 and 2005, 28 pairs of Class A3-64/66 were converted to Class A3E and renumbered from 482/483 to 536/537: pair 970/971 was used to test the cosmetic and technical upgrades and was dismantled in 2003, when the main stage of the refurbishment programme started.

== Current status ==
As of 30 April 2026, Class A3E is in service. The A3E trains are planned to be replaced by the Class JK trains.

The last Class A3-60 was withdrawn by December 1999, with all eight pairs scrapped: some Class A3-64/66 pairs were also scrapped around the same time, and the last unrefurbished pairs by August 2006. The last A3L71 ran in service on 6 March 2022.
