= BVG Class H =

Large profile electric train

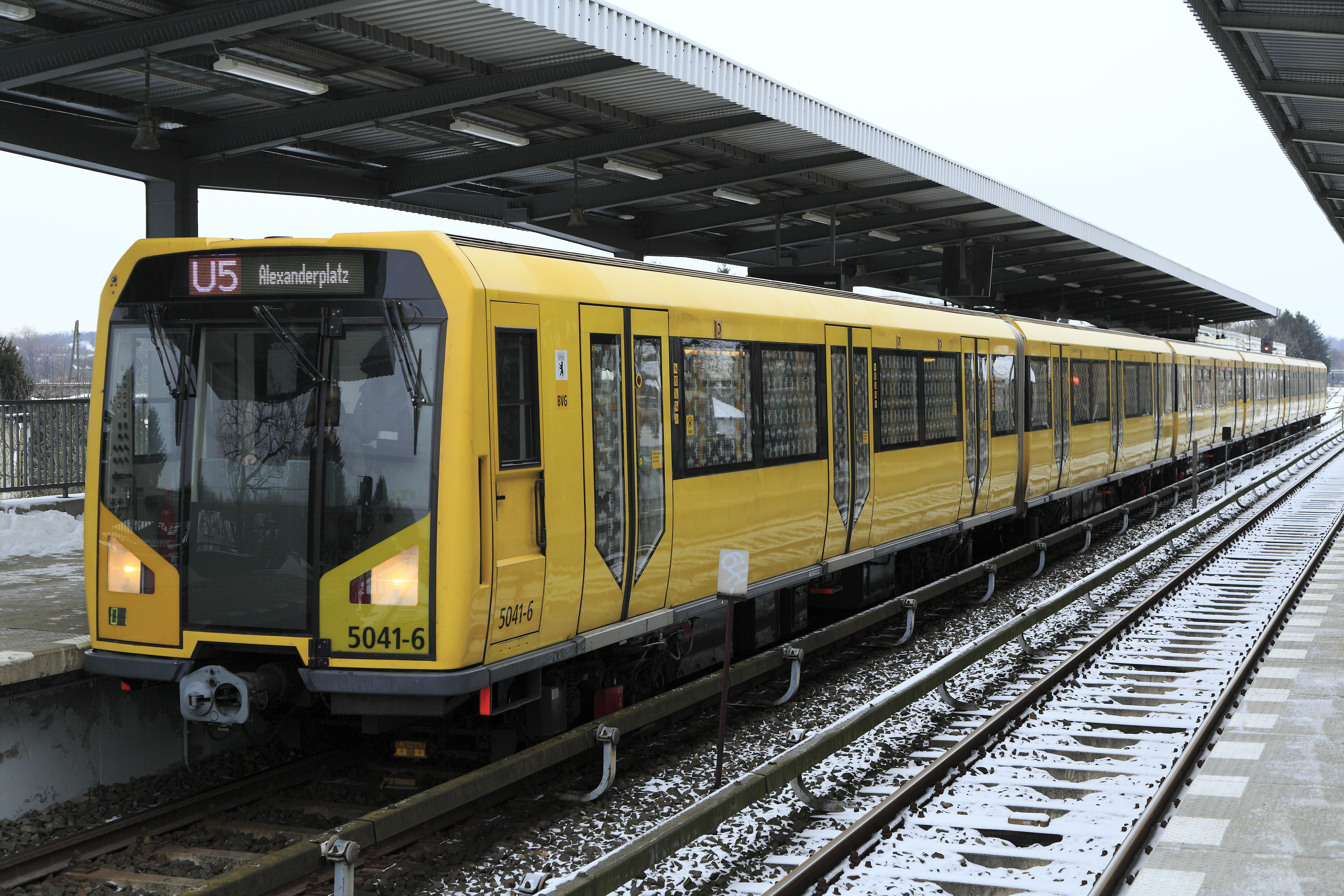
- A Class H train on the U5 at Biesdorf-Süd station

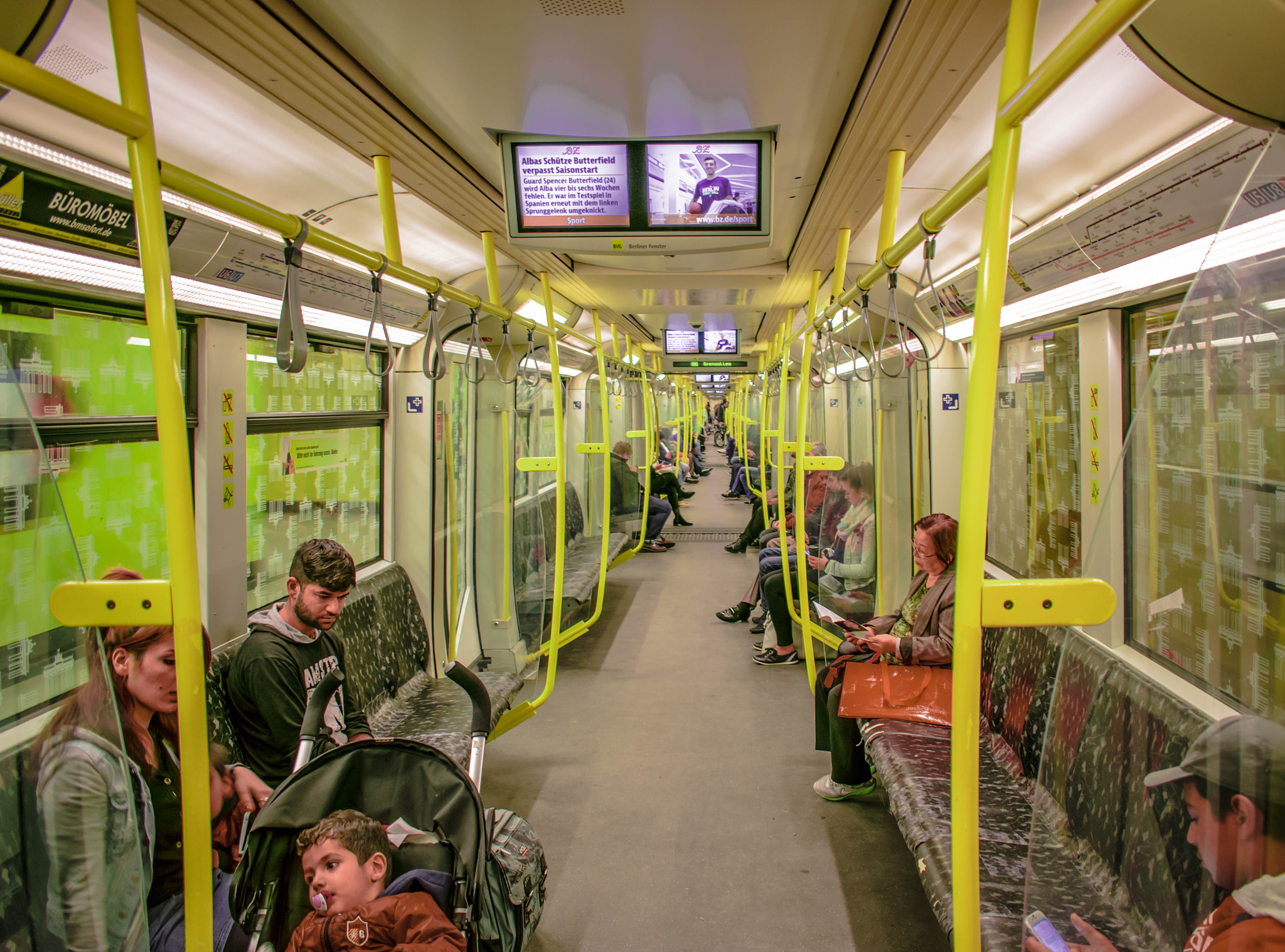
- The interior of a Class H train
- In service: 1996–present
- Manufacturers: Adtranz; Bombardier Transportation
- Built at: Hennigsdorf, Germany
- Constructed: 1994–2002
- Number built: 46 trains
- Formation: 6 per train set DM–M1–M2–M2–M1–DM
- Fleet numbers: 5001–5046
- Capacity: 168 seated; 580 standing; 2 PIW spaces
- Operator: Berliner Verkehrsbetriebe
- Lines served: U5, U6, U7, U8 and U9

Specifications
- Car body construction: Aluminium-alloy double-skinned construction
- Train length: 98.74 m (323 ft 11 in)
- Car length: 16.47 m (54 ft 0 in) (DM); 16.45 m (54 ft 0 in) (M}
- Width: 2.65 m (8 ft 8 in)
- Floor height: 95 cm (37 in)
- Maximum speed: 80 km/h (50 mph)
- Weight: 226.8 t (223.2 long tons; 250.0 short tons); 335.9 t (330.6 long tons; 370.3 short tons) (laden)
- Power output: 2.16 MW (2,900 hp)
- Transmission: WN Drive
- Acceleration: 1.0 m/s^{2} (3.3 ft/s^{2})
- Deceleration: 1.2 m/s^{2} (3.9 ft/s^{2}) (service); 1.3 m/s^{2} (4.3 ft/s^{2}) (emergency)
- Auxiliaries: IGBT Auxiliary Inverter with Battery Charger; 80 kVA–16 kW
- Electric systems: 750 V DC third rail
- Current collection: Contact shoe
- UIC classification: Bo′Bo′+Bo′Bo′+Bo′Bo′+Bo′Bo′+Bo′Bo′+Bo′Bo′
- Braking systems: Regenerative, dynamic and electro-pneumatic
- Track gauge: 1,435 mm (4 ft 8 1/2 in) standard gauge

The BVG Class H is a type of electric multiple unit train used on the Berlin U-Bahn, Berlin's underground rapid transit system. They were the first new design of wide profile trains introduced after the fall of the Berlin Wall and have been in use since 1996. It is the first model to allow passengers to freely walk through the entire length of the train, as opposed to having multiple closed off compartments.

== History ==
After the reunification of Germany, the Berliner Verkehrsbetriebe (BVG) saw an urgent need for more trains, as well as a new, more uniform model for both the East and the West to use. Thus, in order to replace the D, DL and E classes, they placed an order for 115 new trains in 1992, which was later reduced to 26, with 20 more to be delivered at a later time. The first test runs of the new trains were held from 1996 before serial delivery began in 1997.

== Features ==
Unlike other wide profile trains, the H class trains only feature longitudinal seats, a feature usually found in small profile trains. It was also the first model introduced in Berlin to feature open gangways, allowing for free movement through the whole length of the train. The interior colours are mainly white and yellow.

The BVG Class H trains were the first trains in the Berlin U-Bahn subway system to have the automatic next station announcement system and visual next station information LED bar display. The interior advertisement LCD displays were installed in the 2000s. Since the 2010s, the left of the two screens shows the next station's information. That feature was eventually installed in the rest of the Berlin U-Bahn subway fleet except for the BVG Class HK trains.

Each of the batches of H class trains delivered received its own name, with the prototypes being referred to as H95 and the versions of the two later, serial deliveries as H97 and H01 respectively. All individual trains also received a serial number in the format of 5xxx. They were ordered from and manufactured by Adtranz, ABB Henschel and Bombardier.
