= U55 (Berlin U-Bahn) =

Rapid transit line in Berlin, Germany

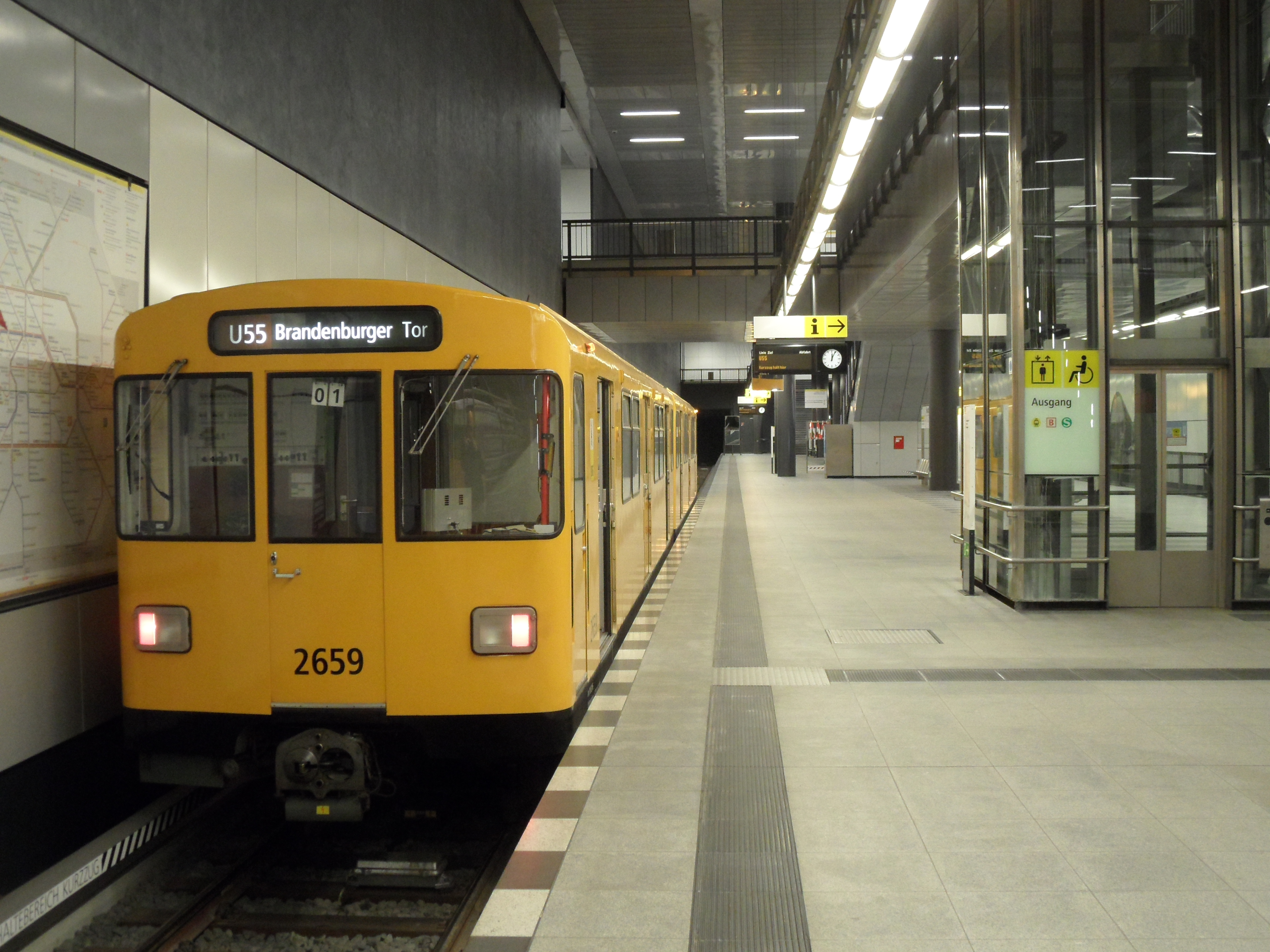
- A U55 train at Hauptbahnhof

Overview
- Locale: Berlin
- Termini: Brandenburger Tor; Hauptbahnhof
- Stations: 3

Service
- Type: Rapid transit
- System: Berlin U-Bahn
- Operator: Berliner Verkehrsbetriebe
- Depot: Friedrichsfelde; (by road)
- Rolling stock: D57; F79

History
- Opened: 8 August 2009
- Closed: 17 March 2020
- Absorbed into U5: 4 December 2020

Technical
- Line length: 1.4 km (0.87 mi)
- Track gauge: 1,435 mm (4 ft 8 1/2 in) standard gauge
- Loading gauge: Großprofil
- Electrification: 750 V DC third rail (bottom running)

U55 was an U-Bahn line in the German capital city of Berlin. It connected the new Berlin Hauptbahnhof, or main railway station, to an interchange with the S-Bahn at Brandenburger Tor. It had only three stations, did not connect to any other U-Bahn line, and was operated as a shuttle line using a single train.

The line was constructed as part of an extension of the U5 that was subsequently postponed due to financial difficulties. As much of the work on this disconnected section of the extension had been completed, it was decided to complete the section and open it as a separate line in 2009. In 2010, construction began on the intervening section connecting Brandenburger Tor to Alexanderplatz; on 4 June 2018, U55 was closed until December 2018 to accommodate the work needed to connect it to this new phase of the project. The complete project, merging U55 and U5 into a single line, opened on 4 December 2020. Operation of the U55 ceased on 17 March 2020 in preparation for the line's incorporation into the U5 extension.

== History ==
=== Origins ===
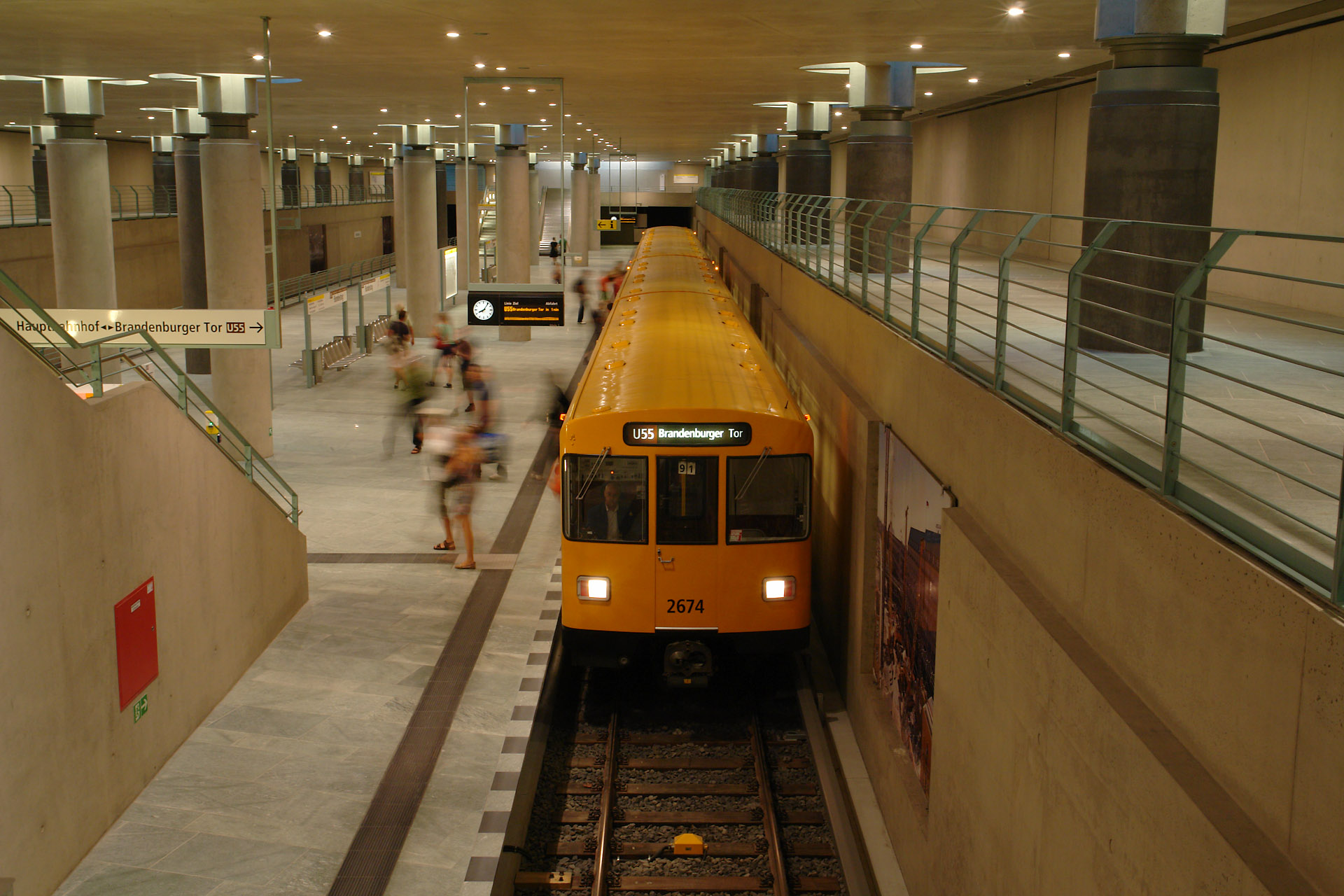
A train at Bundestag station

The unusual nature of U55 reflected Berlin's troubled finances. When the German government decided to move from Bonn to Berlin under the Chancellor of Germany Helmut Kohl, who also announced the reunification of Germany on 3 October 1990, it was decided to refurbish the area around the Bundestag into a modern government complex.

As part of this effort, there were plans to extend the U5 from its western terminus at Alexanderplatz through the city centre, past the Brandenburg Gate and the Bundestag, to the new central train station, Berlin Hauptbahnhof. This Kanzlerlinie (Chancellor Line), so nicknamed because it passed through the government quarter, was originally planned since the 200km plan as a diagonal line through central Berlin, continuing to Turmstraße in Moabit, where it would link with the U9, and on to Jungfernheide, where it would connect with the S-Bahn ring and U7. The line was also planned to go via Tegel Airport (to be replaced by Urban Tech Republic), Scharnweberstraße towards Rathaus Reinckendorf. As this was a long-planned route, short tunnels exist at both Jungfernheide and Turmstraße to accommodate the new line. Plans were discarded as a tram was also planned to be extended west. For now, the line is only approved to terminate at the Hauptbahnhof, with the route to Jungfernheide and beyond to be built later.

=== Construction ===
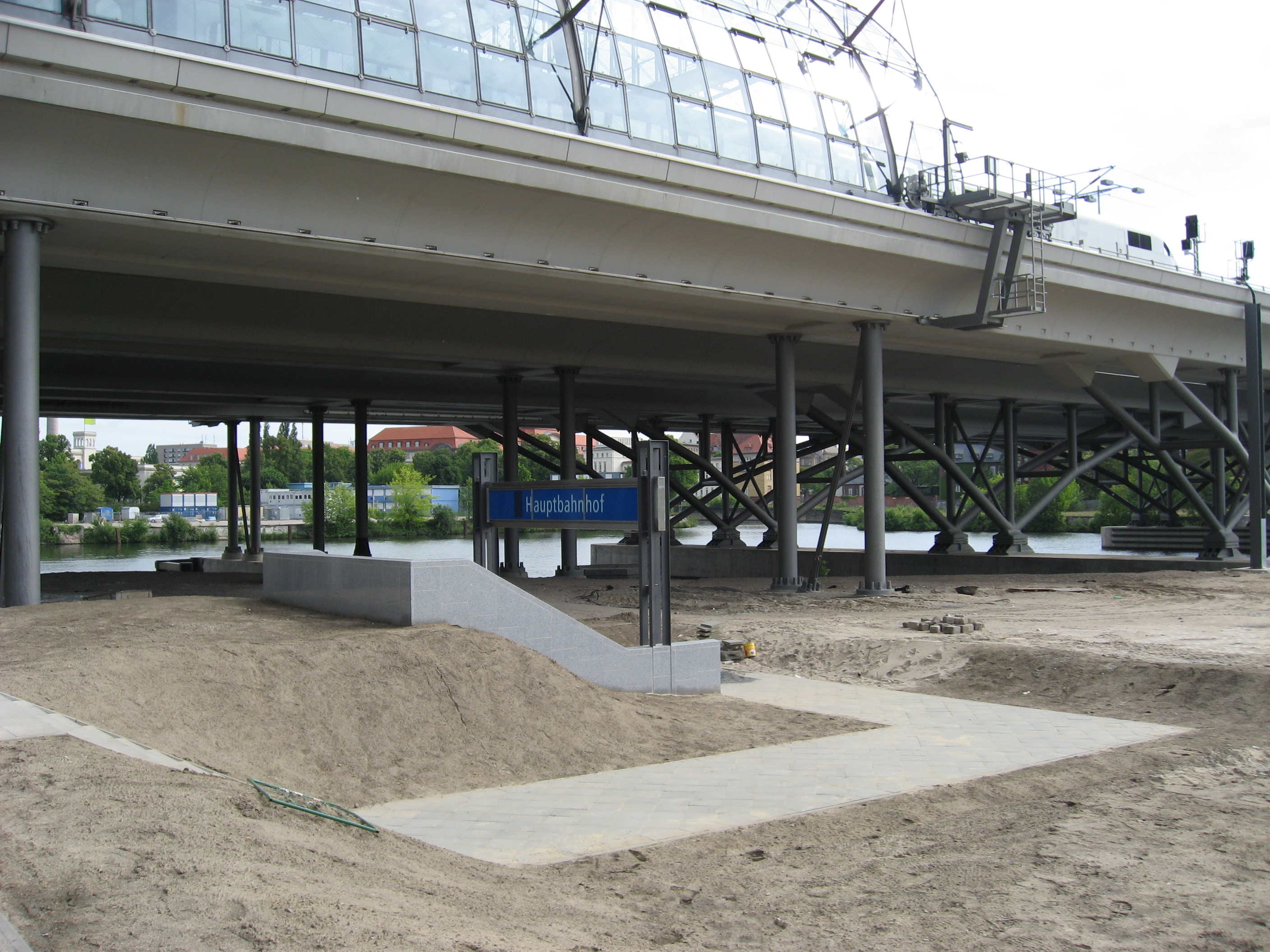
Berlin Hauptbahnhof U-Bahn station, under construction

On 19 January 2000, construction began on the western end of this extension. However, around that time the city council suffered a major financial crisis.

The city had accepted money from the German federal government for the construction work already finished, and by the terms of the agreement, the city would have had to return the money if there were no operating trains on the line. In 2004, the city and federal governments reached a compromise: the city would complete the short section of line that was largely complete between Berlin Hauptbahnhof and Unter den Linden S-Bahn station (renamed "Brandenburger Tor" in 2009) and run it as a single-track shuttle with a single train, without any signaling. Although transit planners projected that such a shuttle would not attract a significant ridership, the city determined that the cost of building and operating the line would be less than the cost of returning the money to the federal government.

=== Opening ===
The opening of the line between Berlin Hauptbahnhof and Brandenburger Tor was delayed owing to extreme groundwater problems at the site of the latter new station. It was finally opened on 8 August 2009.

== Operation ==
=== Stations ===
Name	Interchange
Berlin Hauptbahnhof	S3, S5, S7, S9
Bundestag	
Brandenburger Tor	S1, S2, S25, S26

With the opening of the U-Bahn station, the existing Unter den Linden S-Bahn station was renamed Brandenburger Tor (for the nearby Brandenburg Gate). The name "Unter den Linden" was then given to a new station further east at the junction with Friedrichstraße, where the U5 intersects the U6.

The train ran every 10 minutes and, due to the low demand, there was no night service.

=== Rolling stock ===
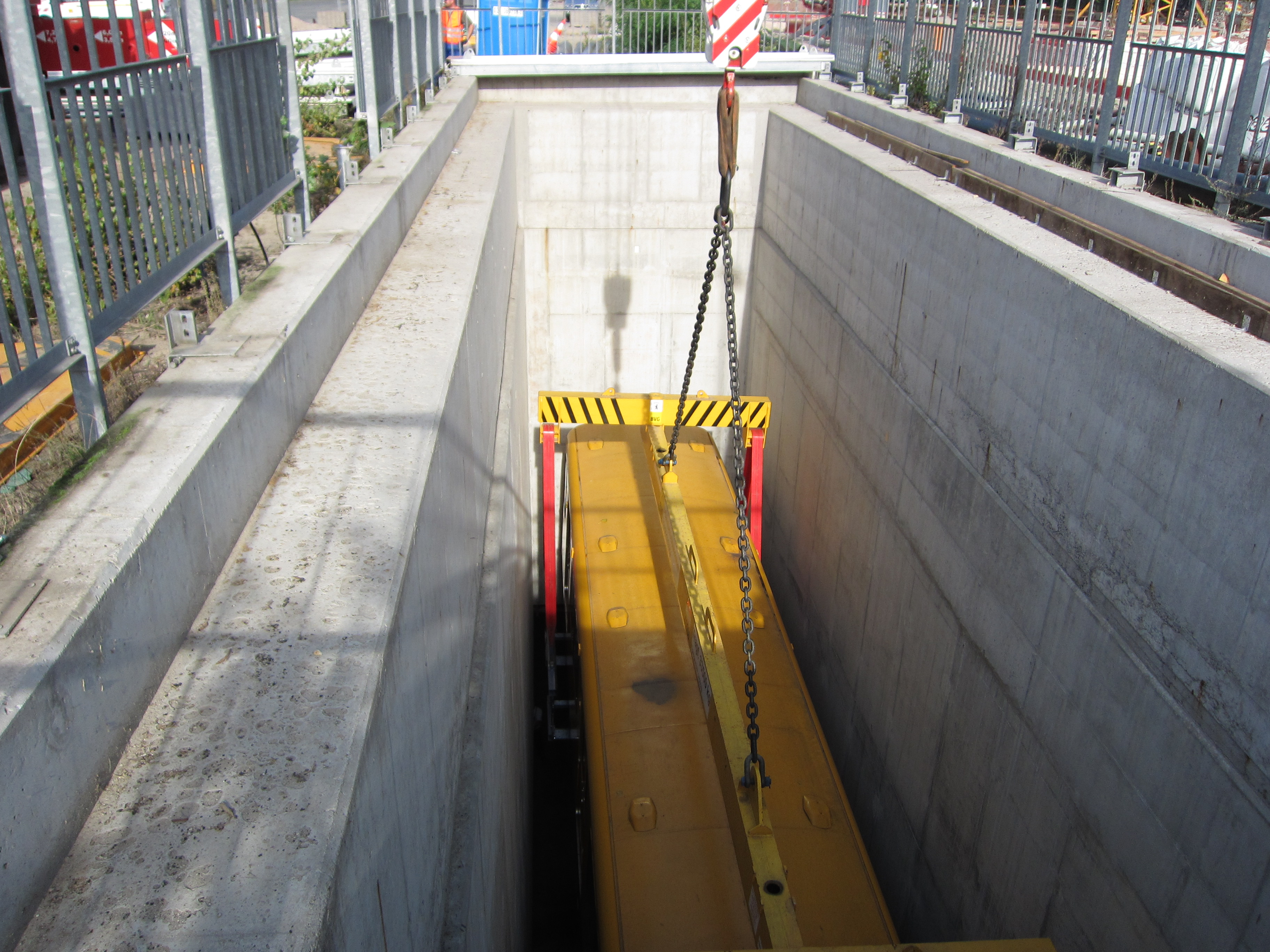
Car is delivered through tunnel opening.

Because the U55 was not physically connected to the rest of the U-Bahn system, any trains being delivered to the new line had to be taken by low loaders on the street and set on track through a tunnel opening located north of Hauptbahnhof station. There was also a provisional workshop for the basic maintenance and cleaning of carriages.

Formerly, trains running on the U55 were F79 trains. However, due to a lack of trains on other large profile U-Bahn lines, the two U55 trains were removed and placed on the U6 in April 2017. Instead, an older D class train was renovated and placed into service until March 2020.

== Linking U55 and U5 ==
The designation of the line as U55 indicated that it was ultimately intended to become part of the U5 line. Construction of the link to enable this commenced in April 2010, and was originally expected to be completed by 2017. Construction works suffered from continued difficulties, mainly concerning high water contents in the soil; in November 2015 the opening date was postponed, with the link finally opening on 4 December 2020.

The link is 2.2 kilometres (1.4 mi) in length, connecting the former U55 terminus at Brandenburger Tor with the rest of the U5 at Alexanderplatz. The link features three new U-Bahn stations at Rotes Rathaus, Museumsinsel and Unter den Linden. Unter Den Linden provides an interchange with line U6, replacing the former Französische Straße station, located a little further to the south on Friedrichstraße, which closed on 3 December 2020.

== End of operations ==
Operations on the line ceased on 17 March 2020, until its incorporation into the new U5 line on 4 December of that year. This took place earlier than originally planned due to much lower ridership as a result of the COVID-19 crisis.

== Reopened as U5 Line ==
The three stations reopened as a part of U5 Line Eastern extension on 4 December 2020.
