= BVG Class C =

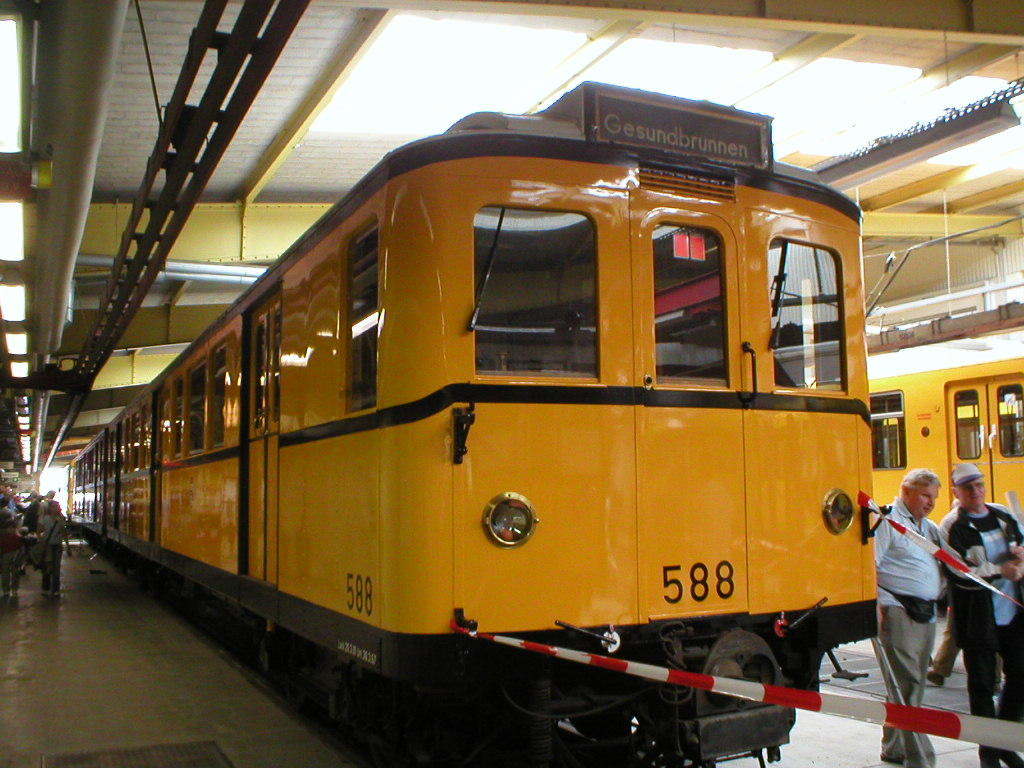
Berlin underground Class C train at the Friedrichsfelde service workshop

The BVG Class C was a series of Grossprofil (wide profile) cars used on the Berlin U-Bahn after 1926. In comparison to the previously built Class B, these 18 meter long cars were about five meters longer than their predecessors. They were therefore classified as Langwagen (long cars).

At the time of their introduction, these cars represented the most modern cars in the Berlin subway network and therefore served as the prototype for the Class A cars of the Moscow Metro. Due to the technical similarities between the Berlin and Moscow subway systems, 120 cars were sent to the Soviet Union after World War II as reparations.

The Class C was in service in the USSR until 1965 and in Berlin until 1975.

== Types ==
Officially, only three different types of class C-cars existed. The original CI series cars delivered in 1926 were considered trial or test samples as almost each car differed in construction. The following CII and CIII types, however, were production vehicles. The final CIV type was initially designated CI, but its aluminum construction deviated from the rest of the cars.

=== CI ===
In 1926, the Nord-Süd-Bahn undertook its first tests with new vehicles. Decisive for these Langwagen were the 80 meter platforms used on the Nord-Süd line. Although a six-car class B train would have made most of the platform with a total length of 78.9 m (258 ft 10 in) (with 696 passengers), this required the driver to brake the train precisely. The new Langwagen, on the other hand, made better use of space with the least possible loss in capacity. This left greater clearance for the drivers along the length of the platform.

Due to their length, only a maximum of four class CI could make up a with a total length of 73.6 m (241 ft 6 in). The total capacity of the train was thus only 650 passengers. To compensate for the calculated loss of 46 passengers, the vehicles were each equipped with three doors per car and side, so a total of 16 doors per train and side (as opposed to 12 doors per train and side at the BI car), which is a faster passenger change allowed. This, in turn, made faster orbital operation possible so that eventually the missing capacity could be compensated for by faster operation.

In addition to this operational optimization, however, the wagons also served as test carriages for use on another line under construction, the so-called GN-Bahn (later line D, today U8).

Of the vehicles designated as CI in 1926 a total of eight drive and eight sidecar, 1927 then again four drive and four sidecar delivered. The cars were coupled together in trains of four cars, so a total of six four-car trains. Structurally, the trains were very different from each other, for example, had the third delivered four-car train on tonneau roof (in contrast to the fan roof on the other trains), and the fourth train on four doors per car and side.

Since the cars should not be used in conjunction with the B-cars, the electrical equipment was changed. A novelty were the self-closing compressed air doors, which previously did not occur in any other rapid transit system.

During the Second World War, none of the 24 single wagons were destroyed, so that they could be used almost completely intact. Due to the order of the Soviet military administration to provide a total of 120 cars as reparations for the Moscow Metro, all vehicles of this series were loaded in September 1945 and brought to the Soviet Union. After the necessary conversion measures, the vehicles were in use until 1965 and were subsequently scrapped.

=== CII ===
Following the successful testing of the CI cars, the North-South Railway ordered the construction of another 114 single wagons. Since the CII railcars were only partially motorized, so only a bogie was driven, these could not be coupled with sidecar, so that only railcars were constructed. In the further construction, these fan roofs and each had three doors per car and side with a clear opening width of 87 cm (34 in). The automatic door locking system, as they occurred in the CI, however, was built only in the late 1930s.

The vehicles were powered by a conventional camshaft. The first brake used was an axle caliper brake, but as this often had to be adjusted, it was later replaced with a block brake.

Another special feature in the structure was the cab, which could be folded away when needed to create more space. The partitions to the passenger compartment were moved over hinges, so that only the drive units for the passenger were not accessible. This was often used when the railcar in the middle of the train reversed and was not used. The capacity of such a train with a total of six cars could be brought to a total of 1050 people.

During the war, only one railcar, number 569, was destroyed. Another 69 motor coaches were shipped to the Soviet Union after 1945, where they were processed until 1949 and finally operated until 1965. The remaining in Berlin vehicles were processed after the war, renumbered in 1958 and reversed until 1975 at the West Berlin subway.

In total, three railcars have been preserved. Tw 563 and 588 (or 1316 and 1338) have now been converted into a museum train. The third Tw 603 (or 1352) is in the Monument Hall of the German Museum of Technology Berlin.

=== CIII ===
In 1930, the construction of the E line (now U5) revealed that the stock of CII cars would not be enough. Therefore, newly founded BVG in 1929 as the sole operator of the subway to other vehicles for the line. While the CIII are externally identical to the CII, they have some technical differences so that mixed operation was not possible.

On the one hand, the new vehicles had a fully electric contactor control and a short-circuit brake. This was supplemented by a spring-loaded brake. The cars were also fully motorized, so had two powered bogies. For this, the engine power was reset from 100 kW to 70 kW.

Except for the railcar 519 all vehicles survived the Second World War. Of the 29 remaining vehicles 27 were then brought to Moscow, only the car 524 and 544 remained in Berlin. The two remaining Berlin railcars were rebuilt in 1952 to sidecar and reversed mixed with B-trains. In 1955, the decommissioning, however, the two cars were adapted by vehicle technology to the CII cars, so that they could operate in conjunction with these. The cars were shut down in 1970 and 1975 and then scrapped. Since the Moscow CIII cars were also scrapped after the end of use, so no CIII is obtained.

=== CIV ===
In 1930 the first CIV cars were delivered. For the first time, aluminium was used as a construction material. This way, weight could be reduced by 12%. These trains had their front standardized. The type CIV is a CI experimental train, which received this name only from 1944. The car numbers were therefore initially classified in the CI. The train - consisting of two traction and a sidecar (Tw 111 and 112, Bw 268) - was built in 1930/31 by the coach factory Busch in Bautzen using aluminum profiles. The empty mass was thus about 12% less than the other C-cars. Externally, the train was noticeable through the tonneau roof and the more pronounced corners on the car body and window.

1938, the sidecar was rebuilt and provided with transverse seats of the arrangement 2 + 1. The railcars were also converted in 1944 and provided with a multiple AEG driving and braking control. Shortly before the end of the war, the sidecar was destroyed and the two railcars damaged. As a result, instead of being transferred to Russia, the two cars remained in Berlin, where they were processed and used again from 1953. The two cars usually operated as a separate two-car train and were parked around 1970. The scrapping took place in 1971 and 1975 respectively.

== After the war ==
Before the end of the war, all the C cars were withdrawn from the line E after the fighting at Friedrichsfelde depot. Due to this circumstance, fifty Triebwagen and one Beiwagen trains remained with the West Berlin transport company, BVG, since they were responsible for the operation for line C and D. Most of the vehicles were processed, with the exception of CIV trains, the cars were standardised to the level of CII. After the reparation, although no sidecar was made available, all the other multiple units received only even numbers.

The CIV train was rebuilt in 1950s for various test drives. The technique used thereby also served as a test of the first post-war cars of the D which was delivered from 1957.

During the early years of Cold War, these trains were primarily used on Line C. The reason for this was the danger of the connecting tunnel (Waisentunnel) that exists between Line D and E at Alexanderplatz. The BVG-West feared technology theft by the BVG-Ost, since they could have transferred a train to their rail network. Only with the delivery of the D and the simultaneous cancellation of the B-cars, were the C-cars allowed to be transferred to the U8 and ran as intensifier trains between Kottbusser Tor and Leinestraße.

The total of 120 provided for the Moscow Metro cars were loaded in September 1945 and brought by rail to the Soviet capital. These cars were adapted to the new conditions: they were converted to the Russian broad gauge of 1,520 mm (4 ft 11 27/32 in), the car body received the typical blue paint and the door handles were removed. The doors were opened and closed by the driver. The designation of the series was type В (the Cyrillic В [W], the third letter of the alphabet, arranged behind the then types А (railcar) and Б (B, control car), which had been built in 1930 for the opening of the Moscow metro). Until 1980, all other types were named in alphabetical order.

By 1949, the reconstruction work was completed so that the cars could be used in passenger traffic. Most cars ran on the Filyovskaya line until 1965 and then were largely scrapped. A two-car train has been preserved at the Metro as a museum train. In 2003, another C-car was discovered in the St. Petersburg Metro, which was probably used there as a workshop train after the end of operations in Moscow. A car is still used today in the Tbilisi Metro as a measuring car.

In 2012, a commemorative medal was awarded in St. Petersburg in honor of the 85th anniversary of the BVG C-series.

== Fleet Information ==
In between 1926 and 1931 158 Trieb- und 13 Beiwagen were constructed. 108 Triebwagen and 12 Beiwagen were exported to Soviet Union occupation forces in 1945, which were stationed in the Friedrichsfelde workshop at that time. They were transported along the railway on orders of Soviet Union. The trains were transported to Moscow and were used in the Moscow Metro until 1966, and the trains were scrapped by 1980.

The remaining trains were progressively renumbered for the rest of the train cars into 13xx series in 1954. This is part of the uniform fleet for the Berlin U-Bahn. All the remaining CII, CIII and CIV trains were hence withdrawn from the West Berlin side in 1975.

Type	Series	Old Numbers	New Numbers	Notes
CI	1926	99–106; 250–253, 350–353		Transported to Moscow; Scrapped in 1965
CI	1927	107–110; 254–267		Transported to Moscow; Scrapped in 1965
CII	1929	545–658	1302–1388	569 destroyed 546, 547, 549–556, 560, 564, 567, 570–573, 575, 579, 580, 583–586, 589–591, 593–595, 599, 600, 605–607, 611–615, 617–621, 623, 625–629, 631, 633–636, 639, 642, 644–651, 654, 656, 658 to Moscow; Scrapped in Moscow in 1966; Scrapped in Berlin in 1975 (except 1352, preserved)
CIII	1930	515–544	1390–1392	519 destroyed 515–518, 520–523, 525–544 to Moscow; Scrapped in Berlin in 1975
CIV	1930–1931	111–112; 268	1394–1396	268 destroyed Remaining trains scrapped in 1974
