= BVG Class HK =

Class of German EMU

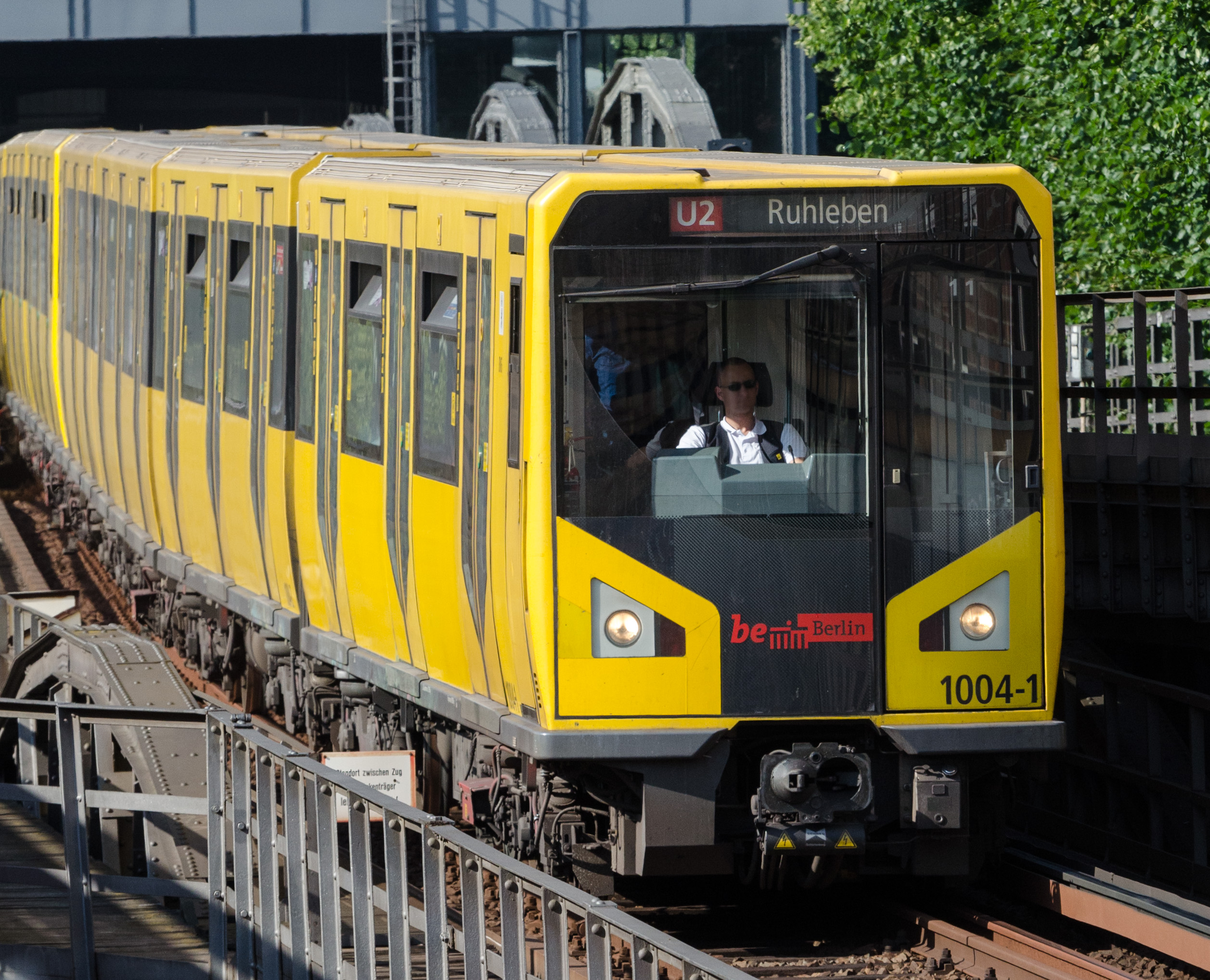
- A HK-type train
- Stock type: Kleinprofil
- In service: 2001–present
- Manufacturer: Adtranz/Bombardier Transportation
- Built at: Hennigsdorf, Oberhavel, Brandenburg
- Constructed: 1999–2006
- Entered service: 2001
- Number built: 24
- Formation: 4 per train set DM–M–M–DM
- Fleet numbers: 1001–1024
- Capacity: 296 seated; 1,624 standing; 2 PIW spaces
- Operator: Berliner Verkehrsbetriebe
- Lines served: U1, U2 and U3

Specifications
- Car body construction: Aluminium-alloy double-skinned construction
- Train length: 51.59 m (169 ft 3 in)
- Car length: 12.63 m (41 ft 5 in); 13,165 mm (43 ft 2.3 in) (end cars)
- Width: 2.3 m (7 ft 7 in)
- Height: 3.17 m (10 ft 5 in)
- Maximum speed: 80 km/h (50 mph)
- Weight: 226.8 t (223.2 long tons; 250.0 short tons); 335.9 t (330.6 long tons; 370.3 short tons) (laden)
- Traction system: Siemens IGBT–VVVF
- Traction motors: 12 × Siemens 1TB1619-0JC03 85 kW (114 hp) asynchronous 3-phase AC
- Power output: 1.02 MW (1,370 hp)
- Transmission: WN Drive
- Gear ratio: 7.329 : 1
- Acceleration: 1 m/s^{2} (3.3 ft/s^{2})
- Deceleration: 1.2 m/s^{2} (3.9 ft/s^{2}) (service); 1.3 m/s^{2} (4.3 ft/s^{2}) (emergency)
- Auxiliaries: IGBT Auxiliary Inverter with Battery Charger; 80 kVA–16 kW
- Electric systems: 750 V DC third rail
- Current collection: Contact shoe
- UIC classification: Bo′(A1)+(1A)Bo′+Bo′(A1)+(1A)Bo′
- Braking systems: Regenerative, dynamic and electro-pneumatic
- Track gauge: 1,435 mm (4 ft 8 1/2 in) standard gauge

The BVG Class HK is a type of electric multiple unit in service on the Berlin U-Bahn. It is operated by Berliner Verkehrsbetriebe (BVG) (Berlin Transport Company).

The HK is a Kleinprofil (small profile) variant of the larger Großprofil (large profile) H series.

== Production history ==
In the early 2000s, Berliner Verkehrsbetriebe ordered twenty four-car small-profile HK class trains from Adtranz (merged into Bombardier Transportation during production). Four pre-production trains underwent trial service for three years before being fully adopted. The completed trains were delivered to Berliner Verkehrsbetriebe between mid-2006 and the end of 2007. The vehicle bodies feature aluminum shells, with modular roof, cab, and underframe components. The power draw of the HK variant is 1,020 kW as compared to the larger H series 2,160 kW.

== Operational history ==
The HK series primarily operates on the U2 line.
