= Berlin U-Bahn infrastructure =

Map of the Berlin U-Bahn as of 2026

The tracks of the Berlin subway are lines operated in the line traffic, operating distances, which serve only internal purposes, turn-off and turning plants and plants in the operating farms.

== Route numberings ==
In the construction of the Berlin U-Bahn and subway was not yet distinguished between lines and routes. From the point of intersection Gleisdreieck each led a track branch to the west, north and east. On February 18, 1902, the first stretch from the Stralauer Tor to Potsdamer Platz was opened, on 11 March the section Potsdamer Platz - Zoologischer Garten went into operation. As of March 25, 1902, after the commissioning of the southern tracks of the Gleisdreieck, trains drove from the Stralauer Tor to the Zoologischer Garten. The line branches were lined up on a ten-minute line, giving each station a five-minute sequence of each direction. Names for the lines in the form of letters or numbers did not exist yet.

In a business report of Hochbahngesellschaft appear first in 1928, the line names A, B, C and D on. The line from Alexanderplatz to Friedrichsfelde has already been opened under the name "Line E".

In the passenger information products received the line names from the mid-1930s input. From the beginning of the 1950s, the line designation of branching lines were specified by appended Roman numerals. It now came the line designations AI, AII, BI, BII, CI, CII, D and E are used, with the line branches to Ruhleben and Richard Wagner place initially ran both under the line name AI. A few years later, the route to Richard-Wagner-Platz got the designation AIII. The lines of the small profile lines changed frequently until the mid-1960s.

In the large profile, the possibilities of line change did not exist. The only branching line was the line C, which divided south of the station Belle Alliance Street (now Mehringdamm) in two branches to Neukölln (line CI) and Tempelhof (line CII). The CI line went on 28 February 1966 in the new line H (immediately afterwards referred to as line 7), the line CII was from this moment to the line C and immediately following the line 6.

After the construction of the wall, East Berlin was left with line E and the eastern half of line A. This oddity, and the fact that the two-line network was simple to navigate anyway, caused line designations to be gradually abandoned there over the years.

The shortest line in this system was line 5, which was a shuttle between Deutsche Oper and Richard-Wagner-Platz. It was closed in 1970 for incorporation into an extension of line 7, which opened a few years later.

In March 1966, West Berlin abandoned the Roman numeral system and instead replaced by the route numbering system that is in place:

Line	Route	Former Stretch
1	Schlesisches Tor – Ruhleben	B; A^{I}
2	Gleisdreieck – Krumme Lanke	A; A^{II}
3	Wittenbergplatz – Uhlandstraße	B^{II}
4	Nollendorfplatz – Innsbrucker Platz	B^{I}
5	Deutsche Oper – Richard-Wagner-Platz	A^{III}
6	Tegel – Alt-Mariendorf	C; Mehringdamm – Tempelhof before 1963 C^{II}
7	Möckernbrücke – Britz-Süd	H; Mehringdamm – Grenzallee before 1963 C^{I}
8	Gesundbrunnen – Leinestraße	D
9	Leopoldplatz – Spichernstraße	G
	Pankow (Vinetastraße) – Thälmannplatz	A
	Alexanderplatz – Friedrichsfelde	E

After the construction of the Berlin Wall initially only the two sections Schlesisches Tor – Warschauer Brücke (continue to the border in the West as a parking facility continue to use) and Thälmannplatz - Gleisdreieck (the route from the underground station Potsdamer Platz to Thälmannplatz was from the BVG East as On 1 January 1972, the section Gleisdreieck - Wittenbergplatz line 2 / route A was shut down for economic reasons. Parts of the route were then used at times for a museum tram and as a test track of a maglev train (M-Bahn), before the line went back in the 1990s again continuously as line U2 from Vinetastraße to Ruhleben into operation.

Apart from these exceptions, the route and line designations remained unchanged until the German reunification. In both halves of the city, the existing large-profile routes were extended several times, the small profile was a "clip" between the lines 3 and 4 (Wittenbergplatz and Viktoria-Luise-Platz) discussed. As a result, all U-Bahn lines were standardised with "U".

The reconnection of the U2 route required extensive work between Wittenbergplatz and Mohrenstraße. The M-Bahn had to be removed, stations such as Potsdamer Platz needed to be rebuilt and refurbished, and the tunnel needed to be rebuilt with relaying of the tracks, along with removal of border and safety fortifications. The leases at Nollendorfplatz and Bülowstraße stations, which had been repurposed as a flea market and a Turkish bazaar meant for storing the last West Berlin trams, expired in March 1991. The amalgamated line was finally reopened on 13 November 1993. With the connection, the new small profile (Kleinprofil) network was reorganised as follows:

- U1 (Schlesisches Tor – Ruhleben) was renumbered U12 and converted to night service. In 2003, it was discontinued.
- U2 (Wittenbergplatz – Krumme Lanke) was extended to Schlesisches Tor and renumbered U1. It was renumbered to U3 from 12 December 2004.
- U3 (Wittenbergplatz – Uhlandstraße) was extended to Kottbusser Tor and renumbered U15. In off-peak hours, it continued to use the former U3 routing. It was renumbered to U1 from 12 December 2004.
- The U2 section was made possible by extending to the new western terminus point, at Ruhleben.

== Network ==
The Berlin subway network has around 146.2 kilometers of track and 173 underground stations. On the longest route with 32 kilometers runs the line U7. It is the longest rail track in Germany running completely in the tunnel. The shortest distance of 1.4 kilometers is used by the U55 line, which has been provisionally set up since its opening in August 2009. Similar to the London network, there are two different clearance profiles for distances and vehicles with car widths of 2.30 and 2.65 meters respectively with the so-called small and large profile.

The buildings of the Berlin subway are assigned to the routes. The total length of the buildings in the small profile was 46.195 km in 2001, 106.577 km in the large profile. The construction of the E line, which was created in 2006 with the opening of the U55 subway line, is not yet included in the statistics.

A distinction between the route and line designations emerged only in 1966, when the West Berlin BVG introduced to simplify the passenger information a continuous numbering of lines with Arabic numerals. Here, the subway line on the Kreuzberg trunk line, the oldest section of the Berlin high and subway, to line 1 (previously: line B). The later built downtown line became line 2 (previously: line A). The connecting to this network small profile routes in the west of Berlin, the line numbers 3, 4 and temporarily assigned to 5.

The later built first large-scale section of Berlin (with the branches CI and CII) from the 1920s was logically the line designation line 6. The branch to Neukölln (branch CI) was expanded at the time of the change of line names to the independent line 7. The route construction of the line 7 was renamed to H for better demarcation and to reflect the new independence.

The other large-scale sections in West Berlin, those of line 8 (line D) and line 9 (line G), were consecutively numbered according to their opening years. During the time of the reunification of the two halves of the city, the small profile line 5 no longer existed, was used in East Berlin operating former line E the U5. The move freed the number 5, which the West Berlin BVG had reserved for East Berlin's line E in the event of reunification – the only line that ran exclusively in East Berlin territory and was therefore not yet covered in the new West Berlin system.

With the construction of the line E in the 1920s, the construction of a route Weißensee-Alexanderplatz-Schöneberg was closely linked. This route was taken into account during the construction of the community station under the Alexanderplatz as a construction advance and therefore received the designation line F. The West Berlin Senate pursued the old plans for the line F even after the division of the city, so that further Vorratsbauten the now planned to Steglitz route F emerged. Under the Steglitzer Schloßstraße a community construction of the routes F and G was built. As a special feature, the U-Bahn line U9 changes for a short distance to the structure of the line F.

Route	Routing	Profile	Current Line	Kilometrage
A	Pankow – Wittenbergplatz	Kleinprofil	U2	(A, A^{I}, A^{II}) 33,516 km
A^{I}	Wittenbergplatz – Ruhleben	Kleinprofil	U2	
A^{II}	Wittenbergplatz – Krumme Lanke	Kleinprofil	U3	
B	Warschauer Straße – Nollendorfplatz	Kleinprofil	U1 U3	(B, B^{I}, B^{II}) 12,679 km
B^{I}	Nollendorfplatz – Innsbrucker Platz	Kleinprofil	U4	rd. 2,9 km
B^{II}	Nollendorfplatz – Uhlandstraße	Kleinprofil	U1 U3	
C	Alt-Tegel – Alt-Mariendorf	Großprofil	U6	20,712 km
D	Wittenau – Hermannstraße	Großprofil	U8	18,899 km
E	Hauptbahnhof – Hönow	Großprofil	U5	23,379 km
F	Walther-Schreiber-Platz – Rathaus Steglitz	Großprofil	U9	1,536 km
G	Osloer Straße – Rathaus Steglitz	Großprofil	U9	13,048 km
H	Rudow – Rathaus Spandau	Großprofil	U7	32,768 km

== Tracks ==
The first operating routes of the Berlin subway running parallel to the tracks to track operating workshop Warschauer bridge and the track harp within the 90-degree curve to 1909 erected there eight-track wagon hall.

The until 1920 independent city Schöneberg had built for their opened on December 1, 1910 route from Nollendorfplatz to Innsbrucker Platz (then: main street) in the Eisackstraße own operating workshop. Starting from the parking facility at the end of the route, a single-track operating route led to the workshop grounds located at ground level.

In 1912, the main and operating workshop Grunewald (then operating station Grunewald) was added with operating tracks parallel to the underground station stadium and an extensive track apron.

The first line-connecting operating routes were created during the conversion of the Gleisdreieck from previously regular railway tracks. Already a year before the accident of 1908, the Hochbahngesellschaft had decided to make the Gleisdreieck in the sense of today's construction to a crossing station and to lead a relief route over the Kurfürstenstraße to Nollendorfplatz. The conversion of the Gleisdreieck took place while maintaining the operation, after the traffic transfer of the new station on November 3, 1912 served the former track rails and towards Warsaw Bridge as connecting tracks of the later designated the letters A and B lines.

In the large profile network emerged with the progress of construction of the respective routes connecting tracks on Hermannplatz (track U8 south to track U7 west), Leopoldplatz (parking northeast of the platform U9 to the track north of the U6) and Berliner Straße (both lines of the U9 to the track direction West of the U7).

Already from earlier years come the two longest operating distances of the net. Line D was originally not intended to cross Alexanderplatz. In 1927, a tunnel was built under the Spree to the Neue Friedrichstraße, today Littenstraße. It branches off north of the station Heinrich-Heine-Straße and leads, after it had been further developed as a connecting tunnel D / E, in a stump track of the sweeper of the U5 (former line E) west of Alexanderplatz. The structure designed for two tracks has only one track.

In order to be able to service their small-profile vehicles in the Friedrichsfelde workshop, the BVG-Ost needed a connection from the A- to the E-line leading there. It was realized in 1952 by means of a 220 meter long tunnel to the connection tunnel D / E. Because of the different nature of the power supply, it has a section without the live rail in which the small profile vehicles to be converted could be retrofitted.

The route AIII (former line 5) has been used since the commissioning of the U7 in this area (on April 28, 1978) as used by work vehicles connection between the small profile and the large profile network. To her belong the two inner tracks of the subway station Deutsche Oper, which run side by side parallel to a parking lot just before the Richard Wagner Square. Here branches off from the former outbound track a track on the right, which opens behind the underground station in the track direction Spandau.

Between the stations Elsterwerdaer place and Wuhletal represents at the U5 a three-track aboveground plant a connection to the railway network.

In addition, there were also two rail connections between the subway and the tram network. The older connection was at the station Warsaw bridge between the elevated railroad tracks and the flat railway line. The connection was abandoned at the latest during the construction of the Warschauer Brücke in 1938. The second connection existed in 1988 between the workshop Friedrichsfelde and the tram line in the street Am Tierpark and was abandoned in 1996.

== Transfer points ==
Track changes, also referred to as "transfer points", are generally short track systems, which make it possible to drive over two points from one track to the other. A double track change allows this without sawing in both directions, it can be a trapezoid or in the form of an "X" with two intersecting tracks.

Track changes are located in front of some terminal stations to allow trains to turn at the platform. They also occur on the open track, so trains, z. B. in construction, disturbances or amplifier traffic, can turn to Unterwegsstationen. Even track tracks may require a track change on the open track.

- A simple track change on a free route is located between the stations Elsterwerdaer Platz and Wuhletal, to allow the entrance to the track from the connecting tracks to the railway towards the city center.
- A double track change in the form of an X is in front of the terminus Innsbrucker Platz.
- A double track change in trapezoidal shape is located in the entrance to the terminus Krumme Lanke.

== Reversing Sidings ==
The Berlin subway network has a large number of parking and turning tracks in front of or behind intermediate stations, mainly in the form of one or two stump tracks between the tracks.

At some terminus stations, the trains turn on stump tracks on the platform (example: Hönow), in part although there are still parking or reversing tracks behind the station (example: U4 at Nollendorfplatz station). The large profile lines U6 to U9 have behind the terminal stations over two to viergleisige (parking and) turning facilities, which are also used as such in order to avoid the resulting blocking periods when turning on the platform.

Notable plants outside the company workshops are:

- the eight-track wagon hall along the Rudolfstraße at the terminus Warschauer Straße U1
- The double-track system under the Genthiner Straße, which is used by the lines U3 and U4 and undercut by the northern track of the U1
- from 1910 to 1932 used three-rail parking of the Schöneberg subway under the Eisackstraße
- the former workshop (1929-1968) and later Wagenhalle Krumme Lanke, meanwhile unused
- the plant under the Rathausstraße, which is used by the U5 and was also intended for the planned line to Weißensee. This is where the operating track coming from lines U2 and U8 flows.
- the extensive parking at the terminus Hönow
Trains in Bahnhof Warschauer Straße

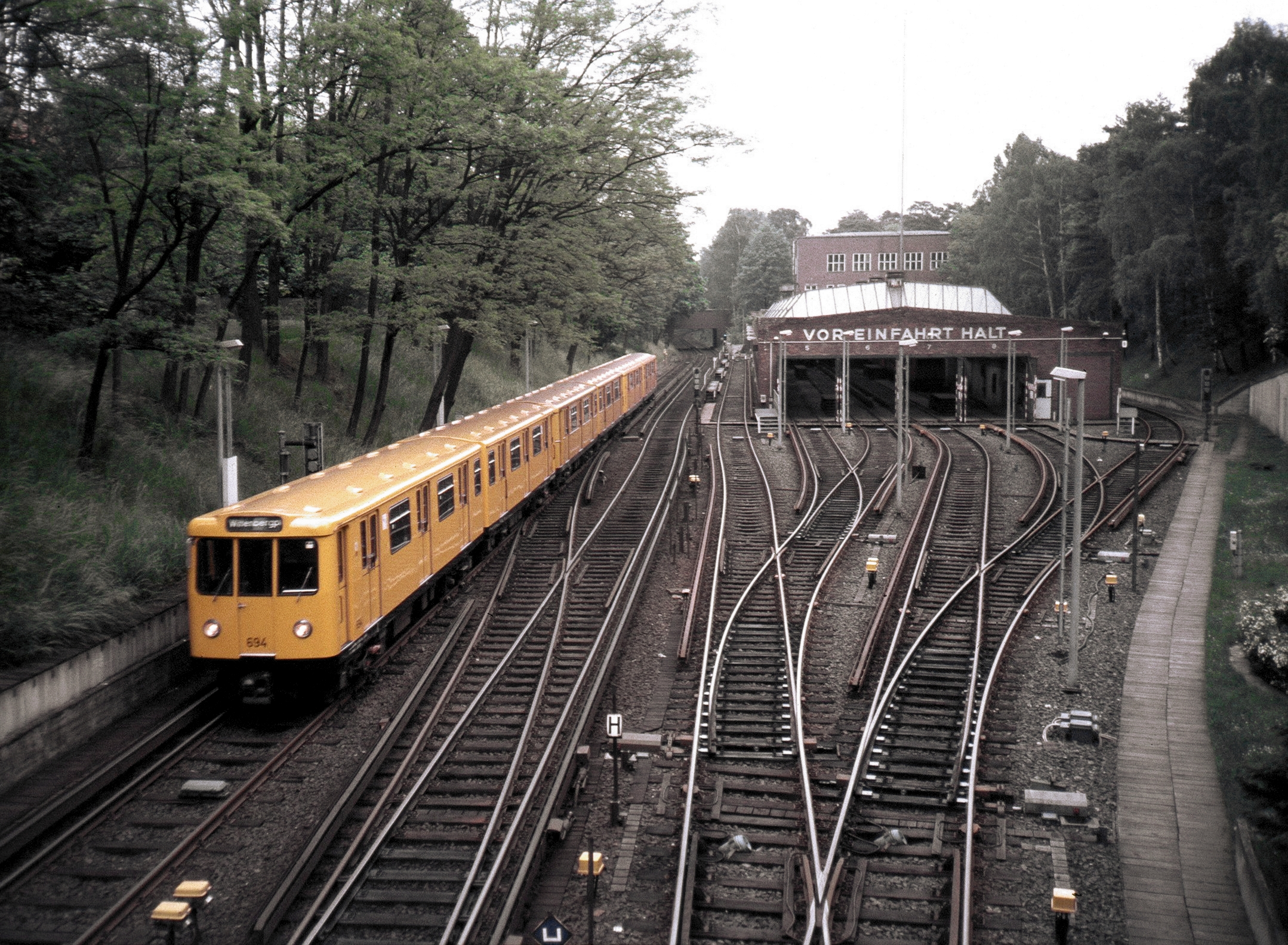
Trains in Krumme Lanke (West Berlin), 1987

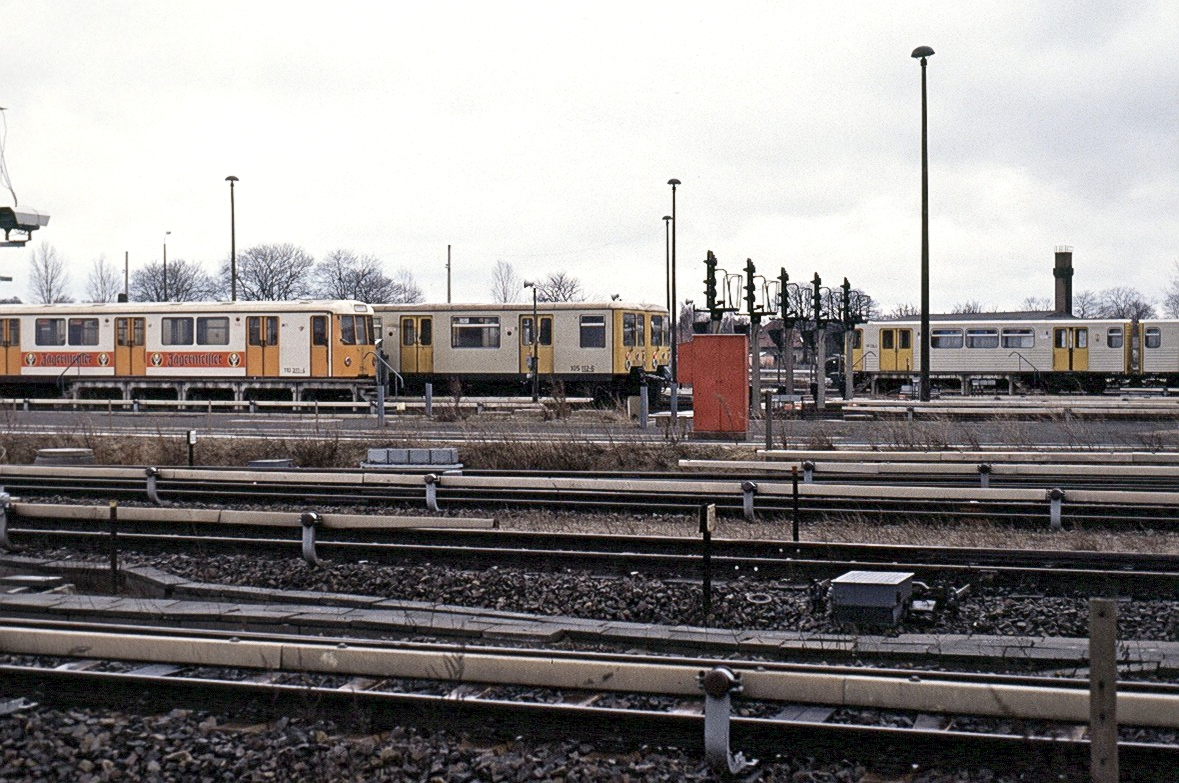
Trains in D- und EIII before reunification.

== Train depots ==
The Berlin subway currently has four workshops, which also houses halls for parking trains. All vehicles of the small-profile network are maintained in the main workshop Grunewald and examined in the main workshop Seestraße. In the large-profile network, the main workshop Seestraße and the operating workshops Britz and Friedrichsfelde exist. The small-profile factory workshops Schöneberg (1932), Warsaw Bridge (1961) and Krumme Lanke (1968) were abandoned. Temporary operating workshops existed temporarily at sidings in the tunnel, so south of the underground station Boddinstraße and at the underground station Rosa-Luxemburg-Platz. Since 2009 until probably 2019 there is a makeshift workshop at the main station for the cars operating on island operation on the line U55, but there is no standard depot for every single lines.

The workshops each have extensive aboveground track systems, which are not used in regular service. The leading operating routes branch off from the railway tracks in the tunnel (large profile) or above ground (small profile except former Bw Schöneberg).

The branches are:

- Britz: Double-track extension on both sides of the track south of the underground station Britz-Süd. Both tracks in the direction of Rudow undercut in Tunnellage coming from the workshop workshop track.
- Friedrichsfelde: Two-track extension between the railway tracks south of Friedrichsfelde underground station. Both tracks run over the track in the tunnel direction Hönow.
- Grunewald: North of the subway station Olympia-Stadion branches off to the halls 1-4 a track to the right, to the hall 5 located between the track tracks to the left. Between the two island platforms there is a separate track for trains starting from the workshop and the depots. Trains from Halls 1-4 at the exit must cross the track to Ruhleben at the same level, but the test track to the west of the station is reached via a level crossing of the tracks. The subway station and the workshops including their access roads are located in open terrain.
- Seestraße: The track leading to the workshop branches off at the underground station Seestraße north of the platform towards Alt-Tegel to the right off the track. The track coming from the workshop crosses the track in the tunnel to Alt-Tegel. It has a separate platform edge on the central platform of the underground station and flows south of it into the directional track to Alt-Mariendorf.

For planned but not executed workshops located south of the station Grenzallee and north of the station Vinetastraße already underground flying junction.
