= BVG Class D =

Electric multiple unit train

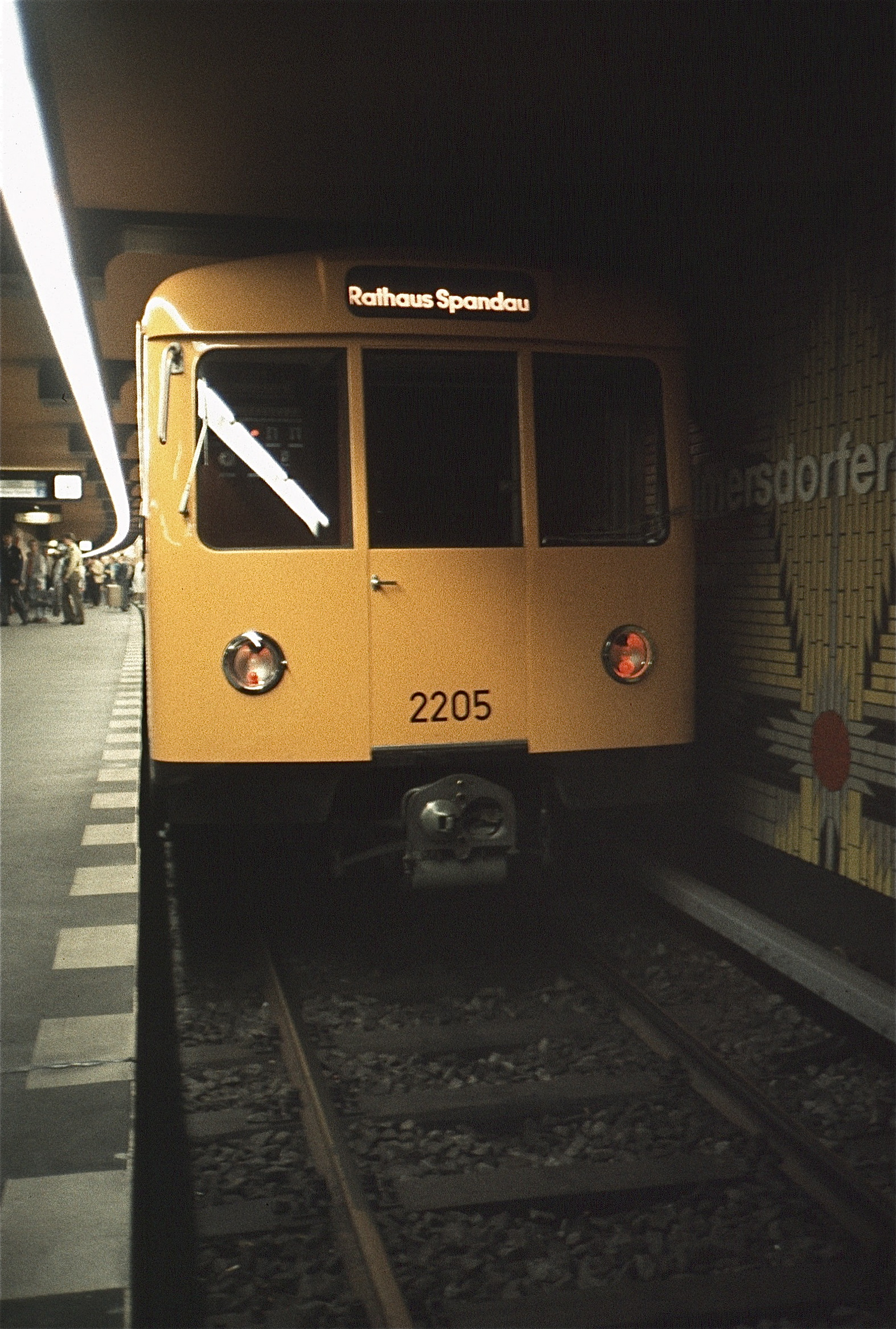
- In service: 1957–2004 (Berlin U-Bahn); 1999–present (Pyongyang Metro)
- Manufacturers: AEG; O&K; Siemens; Waggon Union
- Constructed: 1956–1965 (1); 1965–1973 (2)
- Entered service: 1957 (Berlin U-Bahn); 1999–2000 (Pyongyang Metro)
- Successor: BVG Class F
- Operators: Berliner Verkehrsbetriebe; Pyongyang Metro

Specifications
- Car body construction: Steel
- Car length: 15.55 m (51 ft 1/4 in)
- Width: 2.65 m (8 ft 8 3/8 in)
- Height: 4.25 m (13 ft 11 3/8 in)
- Doors: 3 doors per car
- Maximum speed: 70 km/h (43 mph)
- Electric systems: 750 V DC third rail
- Current collection: Contact shoe
- Track gauge: 4 ft 8+½ in (1,435 mm) standard gauge

Class D was a type of electric multiple unit train used by the Berlin U-Bahn.

After World War II the trains of the Berlin U-Bahn were worn out, making a new series of trains necessary. From 1957 on the new D type trains were delivered (also called Stahldora/Steel Dora). They were made of steel, making them very heavy. In 1965, the DL type was developed, which was constructed from lighter metals (also called Dora). This way, weight was reduced by 26%. Like in earlier models, the seats were located along the sides of the train.

== Class D ==
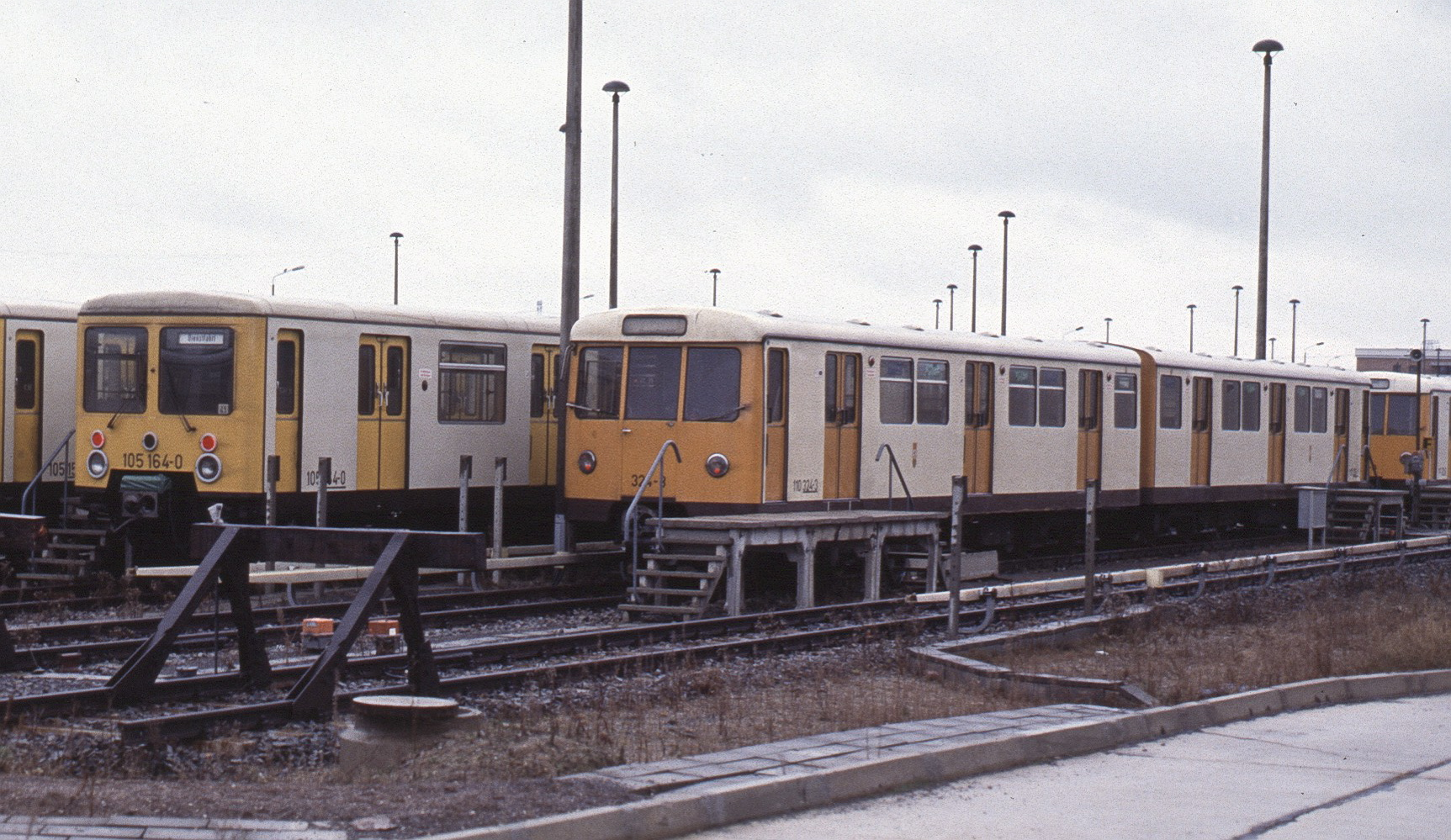
Class D in Hönow with EIII

The Type D cars have been introduced in various phases:

- D 55: The test vehicle (2000/2001), which is on the Line C II (Mehringdamm - Tempelhof)
- D 57: 26 trains (2002/2003 - 2052/2053), which is on Line C I, during the opening of the line to Tegel (now known as U6).
- D 60: 30 trains (2054/2055 - 2112/2113), which is on Line G (now known as U9, the line was built as an alternative line when the Berlin Wall is built).
- D 63: 36 trains (2114/2115 - 2184/2185), which is on Line C I, during the opening of the line to Britz (now known as U7).
- D 65: 22 trains (2186/2187 - 2228/2229), which is on Line C II, during the extension to Alt-Mariendorf.

In 1974 with the introduction of the Type F cars, the D 60 trains were redeployed to Line 6, and D 57 trains were redeployed to Line 8.

Because the BVB (the East Berlin public transport authority) needed more trains for their new route to Hönow, BVB bought 98 cars of this type from the BVG. BVB renumbered all trains that were sent to East Berlin with the class number "110":

- 1988: 2002/2003 to 2018/2019, 2022/2023 to 2052/2053 (when the U5 is extended to Elsterwader Platz), they were renumbered to 110 300 to 110 349.
- 1989: 2054/2055 to 2112/2113, except 2072/2073, 2076/2077 and 2100/2101 (when the U5 is extended to Hönow), they were renumbered to 110 350 to 110 401.

The first trains began revenue service on 110 326/327 (ex 2030/2031) and 110 306/307 (ex 2008/2009) in March 1988 via Alexanderplatz connecting tunnels. They were called DI in the east. Of course, they were painted in the East Berlin color scheme of ebony and yellow.

7 trains (110 386-110 397, also known as 2096 to 2099 and 2102 to 2109) all returned to BVG early in November 1990. After the merger of BVB with BVG in January 1992, these trains continued to deploy on the U5, U6, U7, and U8 until their retirement in 1998-99. The last trains of the 'D' type were retired in 1999, and they were sold to Pyongyang Metro in Pyongyang, North Korea.

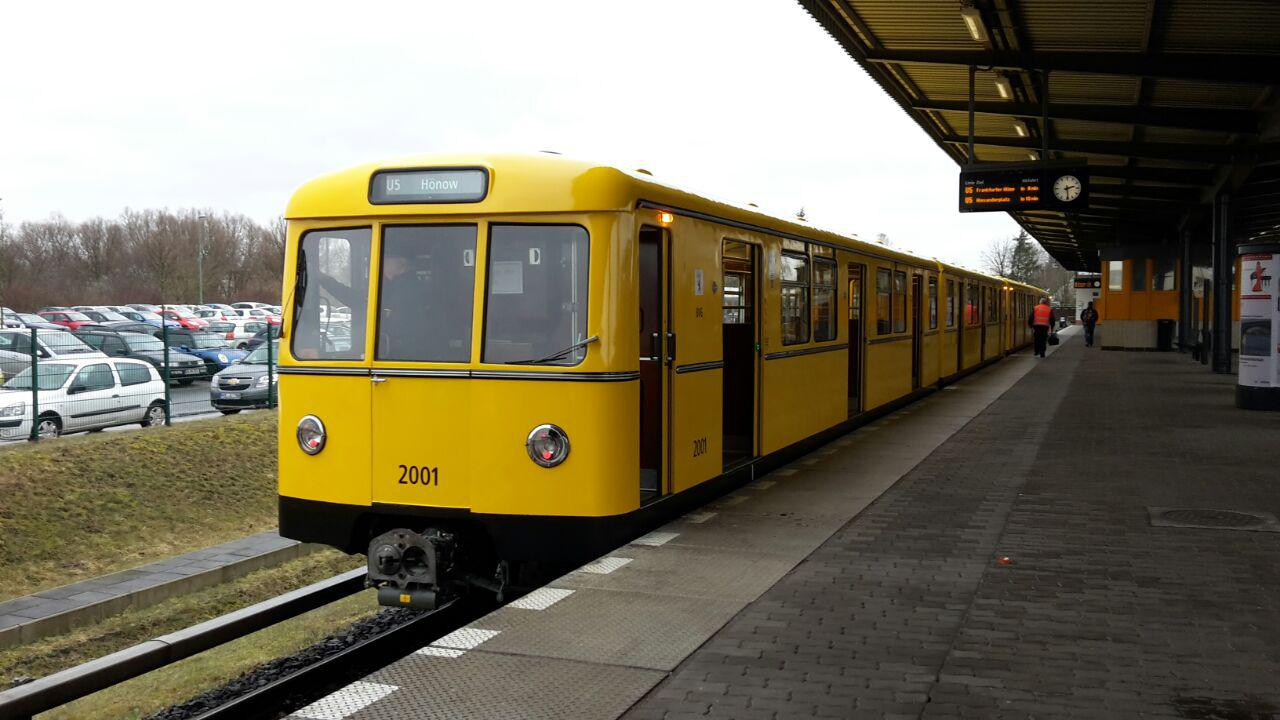
Modernised Class D on a trial run on the line U5, March 2017

== Class DL ==
The Type DL cars have been introduced in various phases:

- DL65: 3 trains (2230/2231 - 2234/2235), which is on Line H, during the extension to Mockernbrücke.
- DL68: 68 trains (2236/2237 - 2370/2371), which are on Line 6, replacing Type B cars.
- DL70: 30 trains (2372/2373 - 2430/2431), which is on Line 7, during the extension to Rudow.

The DL trains were all deployed on Lines 6 and 7 until 1992, and most of them were also deployed to Line U5 after the merger of BVB with BVG.

The last trains of this type were retired at the end of the year 2004. The traditional farewell run of this series was on 27 February 2005. No trains have been preserved in the DL series, and all were scrapped at Eberswalde. The DL68 2260 was retired in 2001 and later sold to a company in Hardenberg, the Netherlands, where it was placed on the company premises. The railcar 2348, also a DL68 serves since his retirement in 2005 the Berlin Police as a training object.

Three further units are to this day as auxiliary equipment trains of the workshops Britz (4012/4013, formerly 2206/2207, type D65), Seestrasse (4014/4015, formerly 2214/2215, type D65) and Friedrichsfelde (4016/4017, formerly 2182/2183, Type D63) in the net on the way. As work vehicles they received in the course of the conversion an orange paint job, among other things, a part of the passenger window was removed.

In addition, there are two modernized DL68 units, each parked on the Bw Friedrichsfelde (2246/2247) and on the Bw Britz (4028/4029, formerly 2340/2341) and serve since 2004 only as a storage room. The Friedrichsfelder vehicle is to be re-equipped from the end of 2016 as a third unit for the regular service.

== Preservation ==
There are only two museum trains, 2000/2001 (Prototype) and 2020/2021. Due to an insufficient number of trains as well as financing constraints, the BVG decided in 2016 to modernise these two units for service on the line U55 until the U5 extension opens in 2019. These trains were equipped with electronic destination displays, and to adapt with their modern safety requirements. Buttons replaced their handles on doors. Flashing lights and warning sounds have also been introduced to the trains to let passengers know whenever doors are closing or opening. Cameras were also be installed as part of security for customers and rail staff. The green seats remained albeit upholstered. The historic trains began running on 1 March 2017 for a 23-day trial on U5 before moving to the U55. With the closure of the U55 on March 17, 2020, the cars were presumably retired again.
