= History of the Berlin U-Bahn =

Wikimedia history article

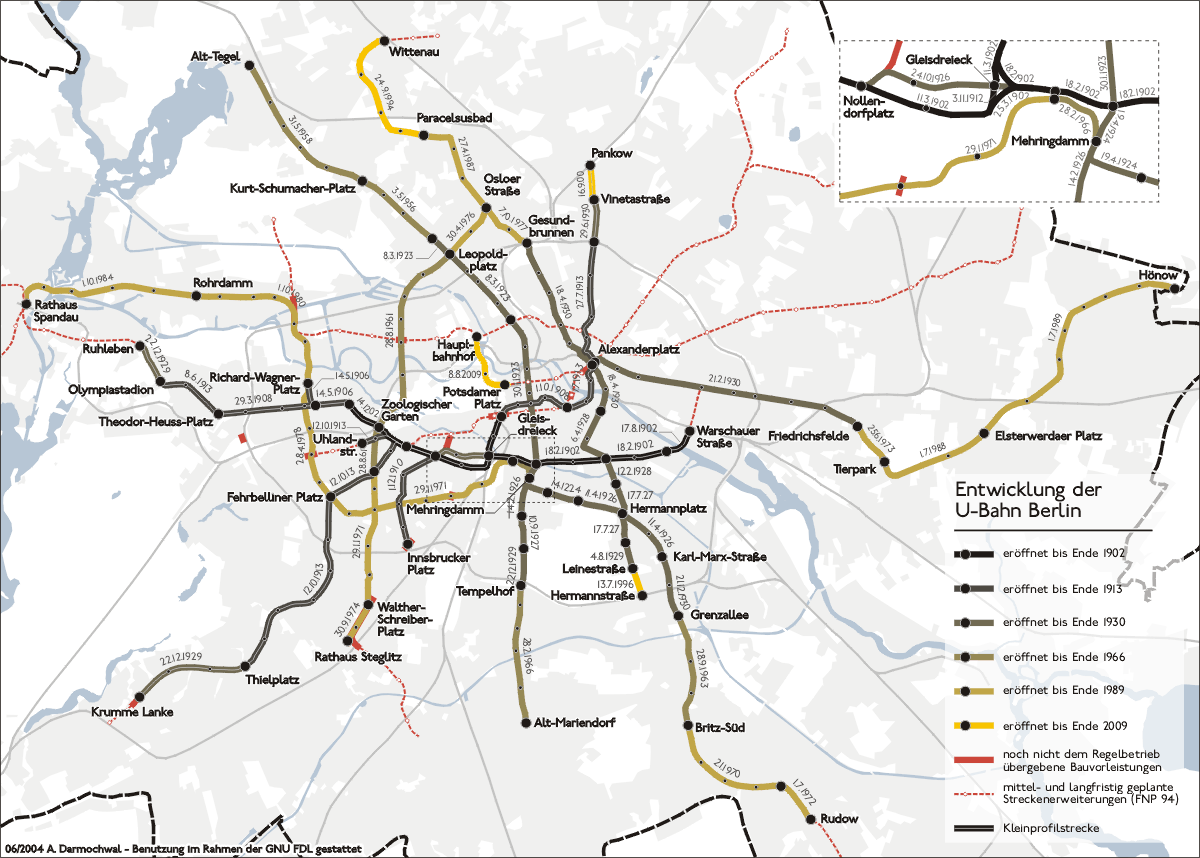
U-Bahn development from 1902 to 2009

The Berlin U-Bahn originated in 1880 with Werner Siemens' idea to build an urban railway in Berlin. During the nine years after the German Empire was founded, the city's population grew by over one-third and traffic problems increased. In 1896, Siemens & Halske began to construct the first stretch of overhead railway. On 1 April 1897, the company began construction of an electric underground railway. The Berliner Verkehrs Aktiengesellschaft (BVG) was formed in 1928, and took over further construction and operation of the network. In 1938, the company was renamed Berlin Transport Company; the original acronym, however, remained. Since 1994, the BVG has been a public company.

The line between Stralauer Tor and Potsdamer Platz (the present-day U1 line) was the first to open, on 18 February 1902. Four additional lines were built before the First World War. In the Weimar Republic, hyperinflation initially prevented further expansion of the system. A new line with a wider car, known as Großprofil, opened in 1923.

No stations were built during the Nazi era, and many were destroyed in air raids during the Second World War. Near the end of the Battle of Berlin in early May 1945, the north–south tunnel was demolished and broad sections of the subway flooded; reconstruction of the prewar system lasted until 1950.

Construction of the Berlin Wall in August 1961 introduced restrictions. Lines C (the present-day U6) and D (U8) ran through tunnels and stations in East Berlin without stopping, except for the border crossing at Friedrichstraße station. The Warschauer Straße and Potsdamer Platz stations were decommissioned. Although U-Bahn construction continued in West Berlin, the Line E Tierpark station was the only one to open in East Berlin (in 1973). From 1985 to 1989, Line E (U5) was extended from Tierpark to Hönow.

On 11 November 1989, two days after the fall of the Berlin Wall, the first formerly closed station (Jannowitzbrücke) was reopened as a border crossing. Rosenthaler Platz followed on 22 December, and Bernauer Straße on 12 April 1990. All three stations are on the U8 line. On 1 July 1990, all remaining ghost stations were reopened. With the reunification of the system, U2 reopened in 1993. In 1995, the U1 was reinstated from Kreuzberg via the Oberbaumbrücke to Friedrichshain at Warschauer Straße station. The U2 Mendelssohn-Bartholdy-Park station opened in October 1998, and a short portion from Vinetastraße to Pankow opened in September 2000. Due to budgetary constraints, there has been no further expansion.

The U-Bahn was built in three major phases:

1. Before 1913 – construction of the Kleinprofil ("small profile") network in Berlin, Charlottenburg, Schöneberg, and Wilmersdorf
2. 1913–1930 – introduction of the Großprofil ("large profile") network, with the first north–south lines
3. After 1953 – postwar development

== Phase 1 ==
=== Early lines ===
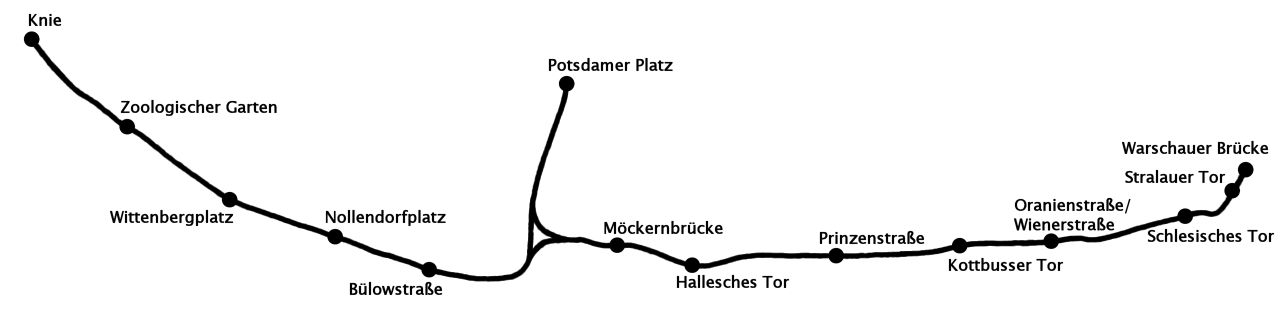
1902 Stammstrecke route

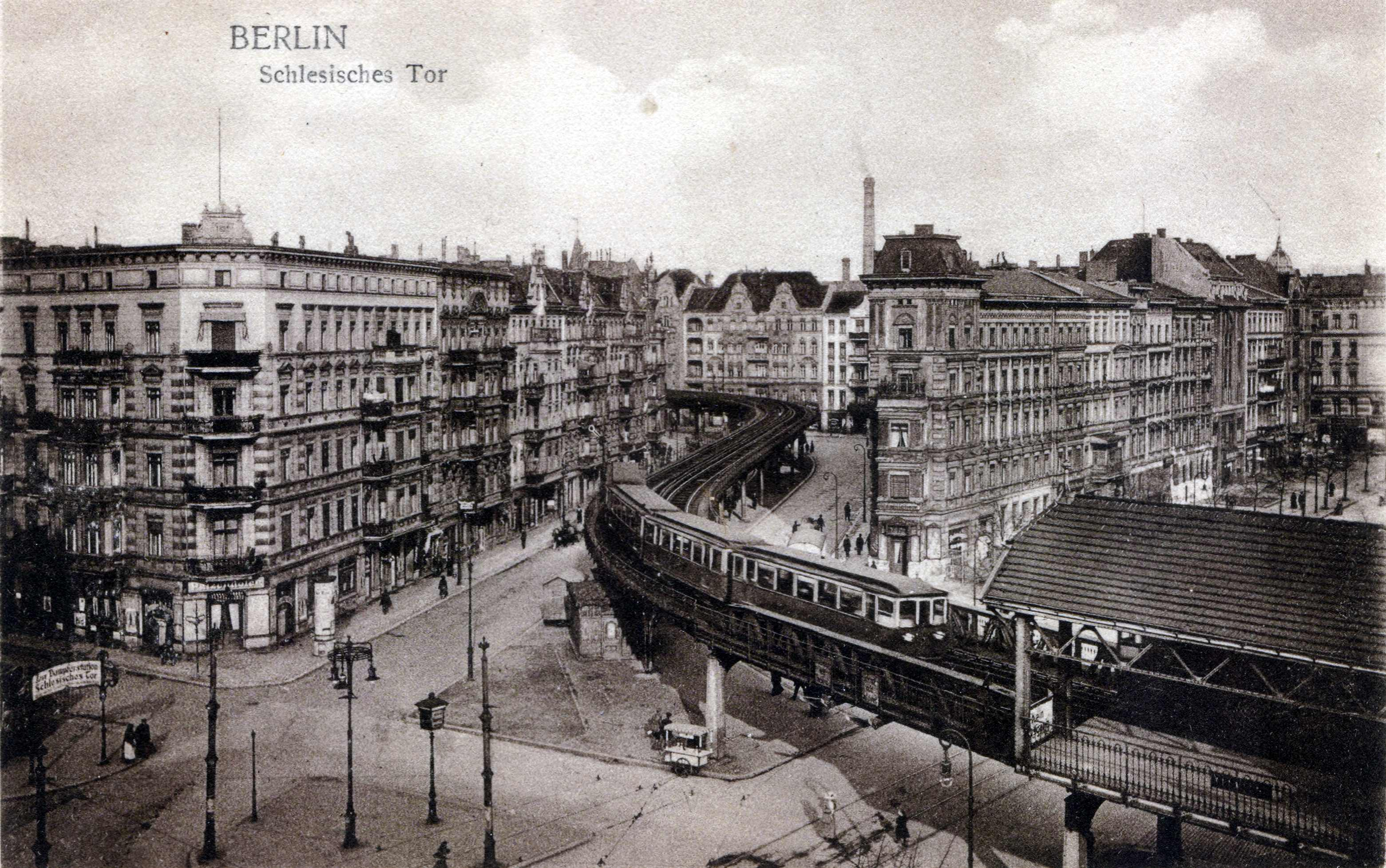
Train outside Schlesisches Tor c. 1902

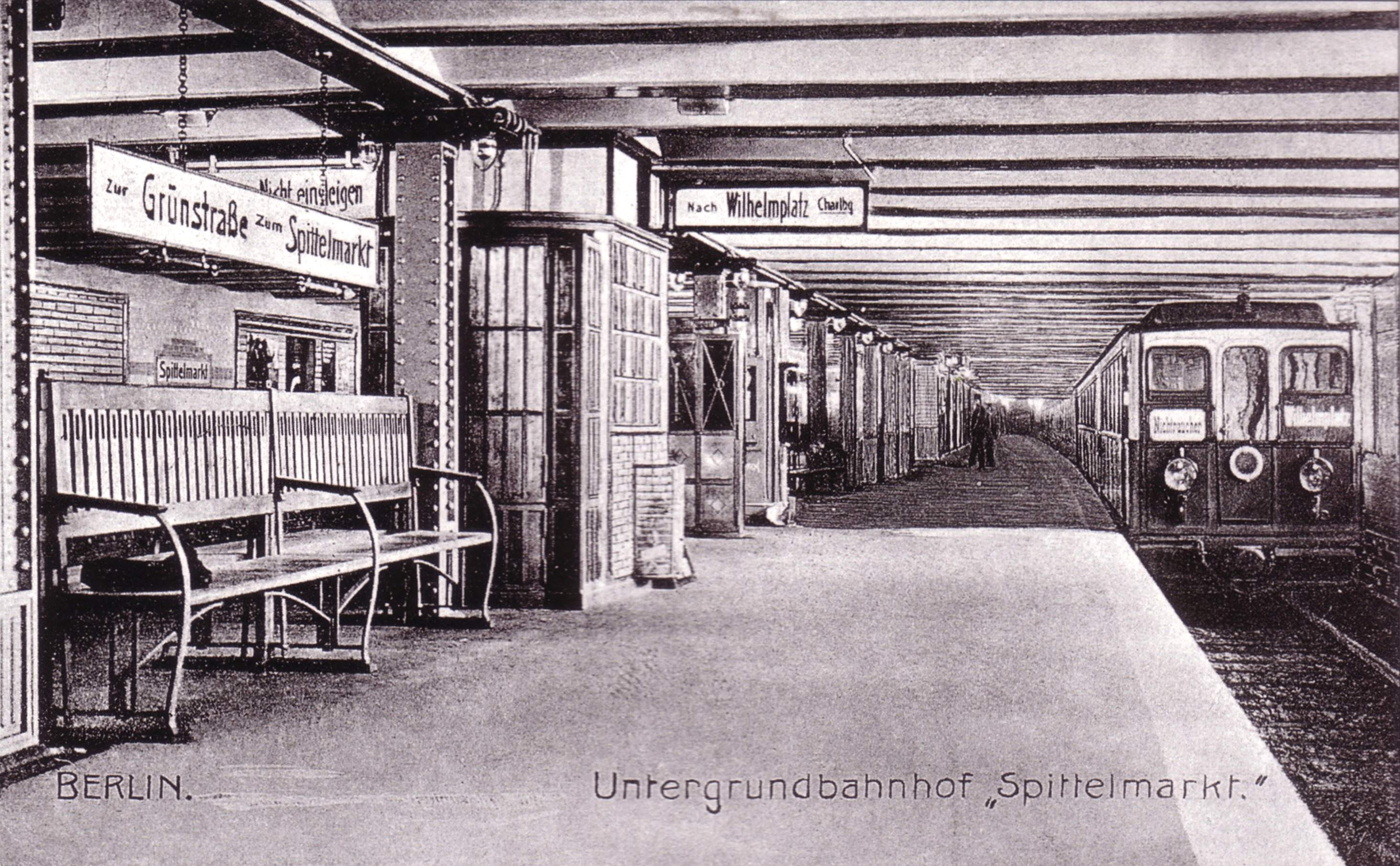
Train at Spittelmarkt in 1908

At the end of the 19th century, Berlin planners were looking for solutions to the city's increasing traffic problems. Industrialist and inventor Werner von Siemens suggested the construction of elevated railways, and AEG proposed an underground system. Berlin's administrators feared that an underground metro would damage the sewers, therefore favoured an elevated railway which would follow the path of the former city walls. However, the neighbouring city of Charlottenburg opposed an elevated railway running along Tauentzienstraße. After years of negotiations, construction began on a mainly elevated railway line on 10 September 1896. The railway would run between Stralauer Tor and Zoologischer Garten, with a short spur to Potsdamer Platz. Known as the Stammstrecke, the line opened on 15 February 1902 and was immediately popular. Before the year ended, the line was extended: east to Warschauer Brücke (Warschauer Straße) by 17 August, and west to Knie (Ernst-Reuter-Platz) by 14 December. Construction of the Charlottenburg section began on 1 January 1900.

In 1902, the lines were:

- K1: Warschauer Brücke–(Gleisdreieck–Potsdamer Platz)
- K2: Warschauer Brücke–(Gleisdreieck–Zoologischer Garten)
- K3: Potsdamer Platz–(Gleisdreieck–Zoologischer Garten)

=== Charlottenburg extension ===
After the original line opened, extensions were planned: from Charlottenburg to Wilhelmplatz (present-day Richard-Wagner-Platz) via Reichskanzlerplatz (Theodor-Heuss Platz), and from Potsdamer Platz in central Berlin along the Warsaw road to Frankfurter Tor. Negotiations with the developing Charlottenburg were completed quickly, since considerable vacant land could be developed. The most important negotiating point was a path for Rathaus Charlottenburg on the Wilhelmsplatz. An extension along the Berliner Straße (today's Otto-Suhr-Allee) was proposed, but there was concern that having the Berlin-Charlottenburg tram alongside parallel traffic was not sensible. The route under the Bismarckstraße would be extended further west and curve towards the town hall. The station was initially named Bismarckstraße (present-day Deutsche Oper), and the line between Knie and Wilhelmplatz opened on 14 May 1906. Both metro lines now extended to Bismarckstraße, but only the branch to Potsdamer Platz also went to the Wilhelmsplatz.

Whilst this route was under construction, the overhead railway company and the city of Charlottenburg agreed on a route to Berlin-Westend. The planned Bismarckstraße station had to be changed, since the line was to branch off there towards Westend. The station was Germany's first four-track metro station.

For the route westward to Charlottenburg, the following stations were to be built:

- Bismarckstraße (present-day Deutsche Oper)
- Sophie-Charlotte-Platz
- Kaiserdamm
- Reichskanzlerplatz (Theodor-Heuss-Platz)

Emperor Wilhelm II opened the line on 16 March 1908, and the inaugural trip became known as the "minister ride". It was opened to the public on 29 March 1908. The two existing lines ended at Reichskanzlerplatz, and a third line ran between Bismarck Street and Reichskanzlerplatz.

Deutsches Stadion was opened on 8 June 1913 as a terminus. The corresponding Grunewald station was completed in January 1913. Built to supply power to the metro, the nearby Unterspreewald power plant in Ruhleben began operation in 1911.

Because of the expanded route length, the workshop in Rudolfstraße (Warschauer Brücke) was too small; a larger workshop was needed. Since the Prussian forest administration wanted to sell their portion of the Grunewald profitably, the overhead railway company purchased 14 hectares of land to build their new operating workshop and began an extension to the stadium station (Olympia-Stadion). The company received ℳ200,000 from the Forestry Administration, and service was irregular.

The planned eastern extension of the main line from Warschauer Brücke to Frankfurter Tor was not built. Operated as a tram from Warschauer Brücke to the Central-Viehhof metro station, it was acquired in 1909 by the city and opened on 1 January 1910.

=== Eastern extension to Spittelmarkt ===
In Berlin's city center, Potsdamer Platz was replaced by Leipziger Platz (Potsdamer Platz) to allow an extension to the line. Construction began on 15 December 1905. The line under Leipziger Straße to Spittelmarkt opened in 1908.

The 1908 lines included:

- K1: Warschauer Brücke – Potsdamer Platz – Spittelmarkt
- K3: Wilhelmplatz (Charlottenburg) – Wittenbergplatz – Potsdamer Platz – Spittelmarkt

The system was extended to Alexanderplatz by July 1913, with Wilhelmplatz–Alexanderplatz becoming the U-Bahn's busiest line. Three and a half weeks later, on 27 July, the northern extension to Schönhauser Allee (originally called Nordring) and the S-Bahn was opened.

=== Schöneberg line ===
Schöneberg also wanted a connection to Berlin. The elevated railway company did not believe such a line would be profitable, so the city built Germany's first locally financed underground. Running below the surface from Hauptstraße, the 2.9-km (1.8-mi) line needed a second, underground station at its Nollendorfplatz terminus because the existing station was part of the elevated railway. Construction began on 8 December 1908, and the line opened on 1 December 1910.

=== Dahlem and Kurfürstendamm lines ===
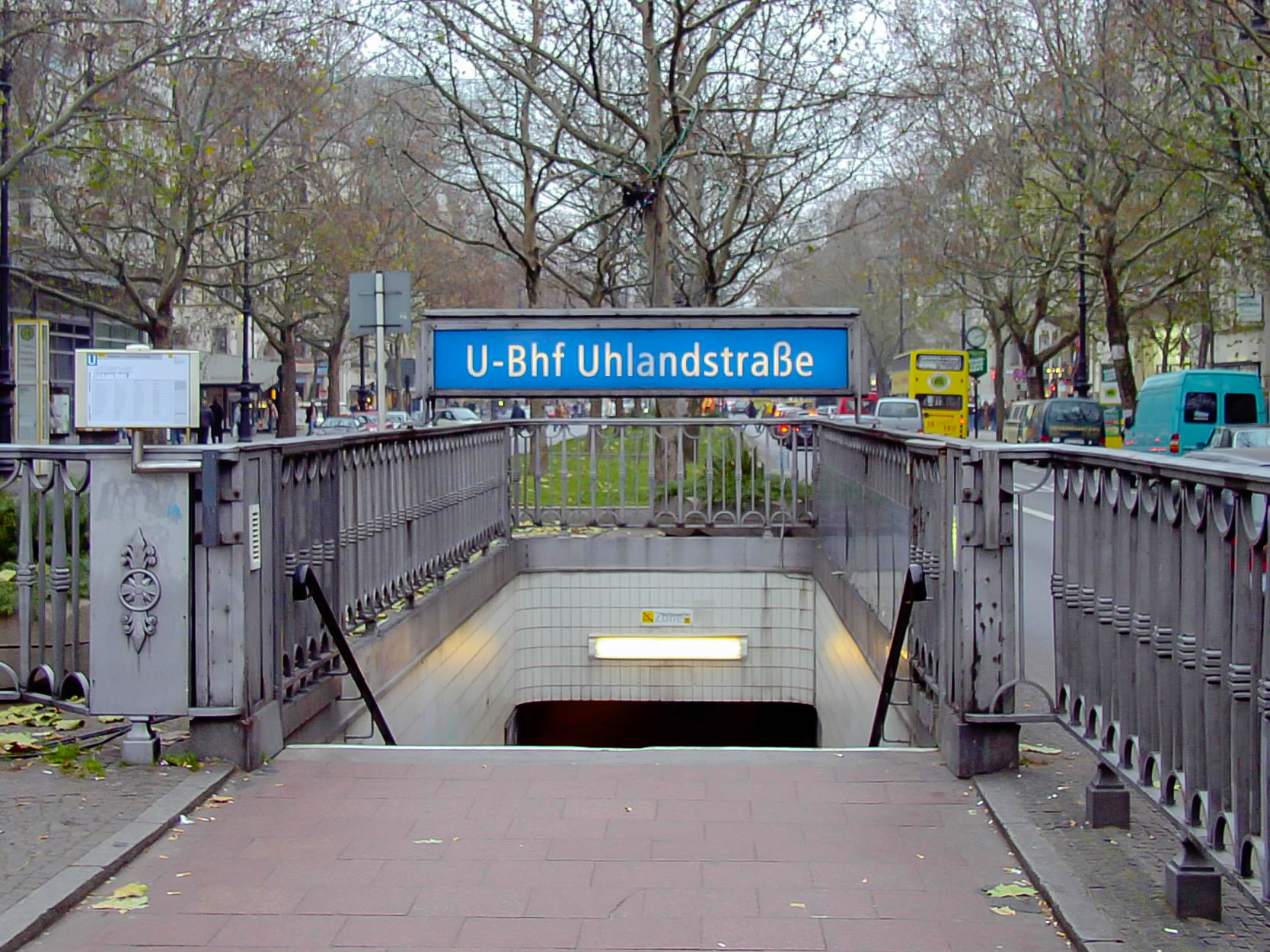
East entrance of the Uhlandstraße station

In the summer of 1907, Wilmersdorf's elevated railway company suggested an underground line to Nürnberger Platz and (if the new city would pay for it) Breitenbachplatz. Since Wilmersdorf had poor transport connections, its government took up the suggestion. Dahlem, south of Wilmersdorf and undeveloped, also supported a U-bahn line from Breitenbachplatz to Thielplatz.

The line would include the city of Charlottenburg, which saw Wilmersdorf as a competitor for affluent taxpayers. After long negotiations, an additional line under the Kurfürstendamm to Uhlandstraße was agreed in the summer of 1910 and work began on both lines. The double-track Wittenbergplatz station, with two side platforms, had to be rebuilt. The new station required five platforms, with a sixth for expansion and an entrance hall. Wilmersdorf and Charlottenburg submitted many design suggestions. Alfred Grenander, house architect of the elevated railway company, was appointed to design the station.

Although the line to Uhlandstraße (which branched at Wittenbergplatz and had no other stations) was intended to extend to Halensee, its only addition was the 1961 Kurfürstendamm interchange with the U9. An extension to the west is still planned, and preparations were made with the construction of Internationales Congress Centrum on Neuen Kantstraße. Provisions have also been made for a U1 station under the U7 station at Adenauerplatz. The 10-kilometre (6.2 mi) Kurfürstendamm and Dahlem lines, which opened on 12 October 1913, were the last U-Bahn sections built before World War I.

The Dahlem line stations are:

- Wittenbergplatz (awaiting extension)
- Nürnberger Platz (closed in 1959 and replaced by Spichernstraße)
- Hohenzollernplatz
- Fehrbelliner Platz
- Heidelberger Platz
- Rüdesheimer Platz
- Breitenbachplatz (originally planned as Rastatter Platz)
- Podbielskiallee
- Dahlem-Dorf
- Thielplatz (preliminary terminus)

=== Gleisdreieck junction ===
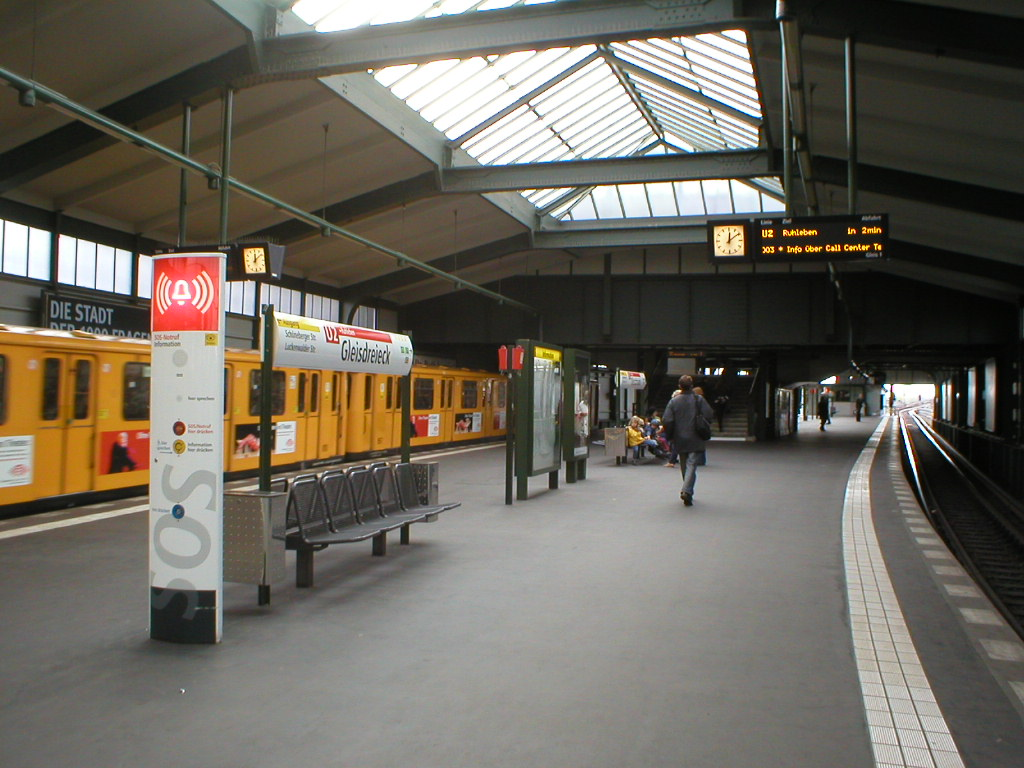
Gleisdreieck lower platform, where the U2 stops

One of the U-Bahn's most dangerous places was the triangular junction at Gleisdreieck, which connected the main line from Warschauer Brücke and Zoologischer Garten with the branch line to Potsdamer Platz. The branch line was protected only by signals, and train-driver inattention could be disastrous. On 26 September 1908, a U-Bahn train ran into the side of another train, forcing two carriages off the track; one fell off a viaduct, killing 21 passengers. As a result, it was decided to change the junction's configuration.

Construction began in May 1912 to replace the rail triangle with two lines at a grade-separated cross, with a new Gleisdreieck interchange station; these lines now form part of U1 and U2. Construction largely preserved service, with brief interruptions. On 3 November 1912, the new Gleisdreieck station opened; construction was completed in August 1913. The connecting track from Pankow to Warschauer Straße continued in use for supply vehicles during construction.

The train services from 12 October 1913 were organised as follows:

- Zuggruppe I: Nordring – Alexanderplatz – Gleisdreieck – Wittenbergplatz – Bismarckstraße – Wilhelmplatz (extended to Stadion when required)
- Zuggruppe II: Nordring – Alexanderplatz – Gleisdreieck – Wittenbergplatz – Fehrbelliner Platz
- Zuggruppe III: Warschauer Brücke – Hallesches Tor – Gleisdreieck
- Zuggruppe IV: Nollendorfplatz – Bayerischer Platz – Hauptstraße (Schöneberger Untergrundbahn)
- Zuggruppe V: Bismarckstraße – Reichskanzlerplatz (extended to Stadion when required)
- Zuggruppe VI: Fehrbelliner Platz – Breitenbachplatz – Thielplatz
- Zuggruppe VII: Wittenbergplatz – Uhlandstraße (Kurfürstendamm line)

== Phase 2 ==
=== Nord-Süd Bahn ===
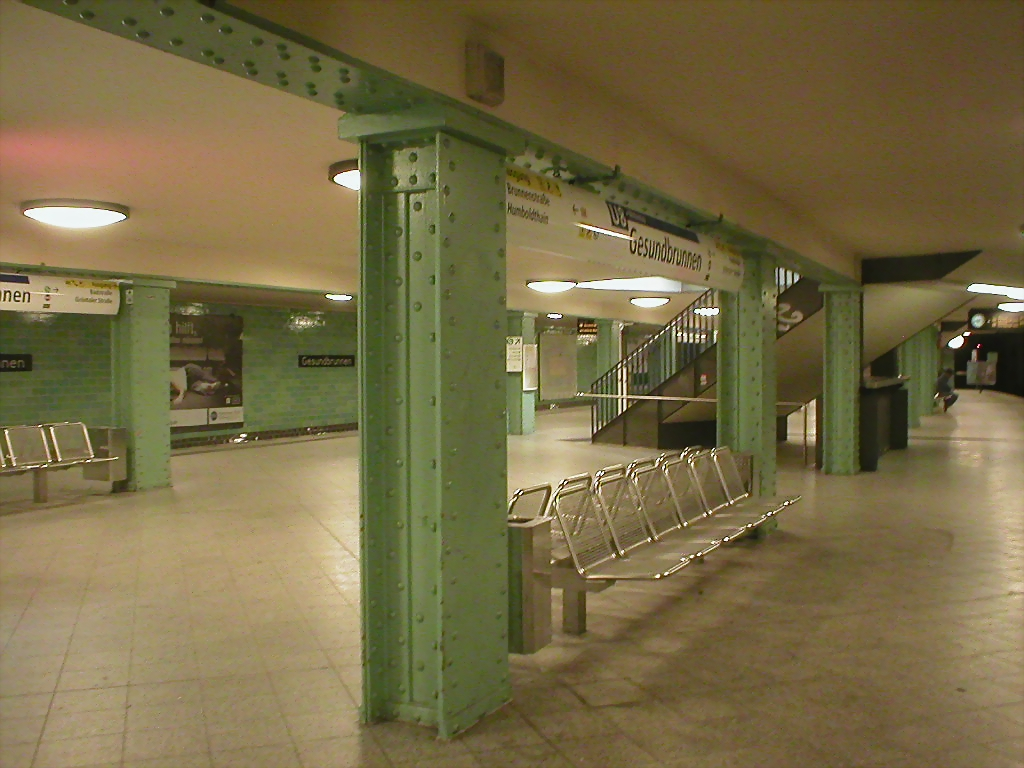
1920s stations could not afford opulent decoration.

The early network ran mostly east to west, connecting Berlin's more-prosperous areas to increase profitability. To open the system to more of the city's workers, the city wanted to add north–south lines. The surrounding areas were annexed in 1920 to form Groß-Berlin (Greater Berlin), giving the city greater bargaining power with the private Hochbahngesellschaft (elevated railway company). The new lines would use wider carriages on the same 1,435 mm (4 ft 8 1/2 in) standard gauge track, increasing passenger capacity, and became known as the Großprofil ("large profile") network.

Construction of the Nord-Süd-Bahn (North–South Railway), connecting Wedding in the north to Tempelhof and Neukölln in the south, had begun in December 1912 but halted for the First World War. Work resumed in 1919, although hyperinflation slowed progress. The first section, between Hallesches Tor and Stettiner Bahnhof (Naturkundemuseum), opened on 30 January 1923 and was extended to Seestraße two months later.

The new line, which was underfunded, had to use trains from the old Kleinprofil network; their carriage exits were widened to fill the gap to the platforms with wooden boards which passengers called Blumenbretter ("boards for flower pots"). As the G1 line from 1923 to 1928, it branched at Belle-Alliance-Straße (present-day Mehringdamm); the extension south to Tempelhof opened on 22 December 1929, and the branch to Grenzallee on 21 December 1930.

The Neukölln line opened in stages, including the G1 line:

- Hallesches Tor–Gneisenaustraße (19 April 1924)
- Gneisenaustraße–Hasenheide (14 December 1924)
- Hasenheide–Bergstraße (11 April 1926)
- Bergstraße–Grenzallee (21 December 1930)

The other extension, a branch to Kreuzberg, was opened on 14 February 1926. Line G2 to Tempelhof opened on 22 December 1929.

=== GN Line ===
In 1912, plans were approved for AEG to build a north–south underground line; the line was called GN-Bahn after its terminals, Gesundbrunnen and Neukölln (via Alexanderplatz). Financial difficulties halted construction in 1919; the liquidation of AEG-Schnellbahn-AG and Berlin's commitment to the Nord-Süd-Bahn prevented further development until 1926.

The first section, between Boddinstraße and Schönleinstraße, opened on 17 July 1927 with Hermannplatz the first station at which passengers could transfer between two Großprofil lines. Northern sections, which required relocation of the Kottbusser Tor station, opened in stages. The line was called G3 until 1928, when it was renamed Line D. The completed route, from Gesundbrunnen to Leinestraße, opened on 18 April 1930.

=== Last Kleinprofil line ===
The small-profile system was extended only slightly during the Weimar Republic era, and the Gleisdreieck junction was completed. The additional line created by the conversion of the three-way junction to a cross at Gleisdreieck was extended under Kurfürstenstraße to Nollendorfplatz and opened on 24 October 1926 with the rebuilt Nollendorfplatz station. The Kurfürstenstraße station indicates the difficult economic times in which it was built. The Nollendorfplatz station was completely rebuilt to incorporate the Schöneberg line (present-day U4), which was independently operated after its 1920 takeover by the city of Berlin. The Nollendorfplatz station has two underground platforms, one above the other and identical in appearance. The Schöneberg line ends on the upper level, across the platform from trains coming from Wittenbergplatz. Trains run from the lower level to Schöneberg and Wittenbergplatz, also allowing cross-platform transfers. The elevated U2 station was unchanged. Its ornate dome was destroyed during World War II, and a simpler dome was built for the U-Bahn's 100th anniversary in 2002. The K8 line was merged with the K2 in 1926.

=== Dahlem spur line ===
An extension south of the Wilmersdorfer-Dahlem-Bahn seemed unfeasible. The track was in poor condition, capable of only single-car service from Breitenbachplatz to Thieplatz. The city of Berlin was reluctant to appropriate the route from the Dahlem council or the Prussian treasury. In 1926, however, Prussia wanted to hand over the route free of charge (and debt); the state offered the Sommerfeld Group land and construction costs for an extension to Krumme Lanke.

The spur line's stations are:

- Krumme Lanke
- Onkel Toms Hütte
- Oskar-Helene-Heim

The section opened on 22 December 1929, and the Krumme Lanke entrance is one of Alfred Grenander's late works. The terminus of present-day U3 is named for the nearby lake.

=== Under Frankfurter Allee ===
Before control of the U-Bahn was given to the BVG in 1929, Hochbahngesellschaft began construction of a final line which (unlike its earlier lines) would be part of the Großprofil network. Intended as a U2 branch line, the E line ran under Frankfurter Allee between Alexanderplatz and Friedrichsfelde before World War II. The line opened on 21 December 1930. Its stations are:

- Alexanderplatz (interchange)
- Schillingstraße
- Strausberger Platz
- Memeler Straße (present-day Weberwiese)
- Petersburger Straße (Frankfurter Tor)
- Samariterstraße
- Frankfurter Allee (S-Bahn interchange)
- Magdalenenstraße
- Lichtenberg (Ringbahn interchange)
- Friedrichsfelde (terminus and depot)

=== End of phase 2 ===
The U-Bahn, 76 kilometres (47 mi) long in 1931, carried 265.5 million passengers that year. During the Great Depression, Berlin lacked the money to build additional subway lines. Letter and Roman-numeral line names were gradually introduced in the late 1920s.

1931 routes
Kleinprofil network		Großprofil network	
A^{I}	Pankow (Vinetastraße) – Ruhleben	C^{I}	Seestraße – Grenzallee
A^{II}	Pankow (Vinetastraße) – Krumme Lanke	C^{II}	Seestraße – Tempelhof
A^{III}	Städtische Oper – Wilhelmplatz	D	Gesundbrunnen – Leinestraße
B^{I}	Warschauer Brücke – Hauptstraße	E	Alexanderplatz – Friedrichsfelde
B^{II}	Warschauer Brücke – Uhlandstraße		

== Nazi era and aftermath ==
Planned lines
A^{I}	Pankow (Breite Straße)–Ruhleben
A^{II}	Alexanderplatz–Kleinmachnow
B	Thaerstraße–Lichterfelde West
C^{I}	Otawistraße–Trabrennbahn Mariendorf
C^{II}	Ordensmeisterstraße–Herminpfad
D	Christianiastraße (Osloer Straße)–Britz
E	Beusselstraße–Treskowallee
F^{I}	Marzahn–Spandau-Johannisstift
F^{II}	Weißensee–Lankwitz
F^{III}	Pichelsdorf–Kladow
G	Lübars–Marienfelde
H	Runder Platz–Buschkrug
R	Ring line

The seizure of power by the Nazi Party affected the U-Bahn. The Nazi flag was hung in every station, and two stations were renamed: Reichskanzlerplatz became Adolf-Hitler-Platz on 24 April 1933, and Schönhauser Tor became Horst-Wessel-Platz on 1 May 1934. Extensive plans—primarily by architect Albert Speer—were drawn up which included a circular line crossing established U-Bahn lines, and new lines (or extensions) to outlying districts. Despite the plans, no U-Bahn development occurred.

=== Germania plans ===
Germania, Nazi Germany's proposed imperial capital, was expected to have a population of ten million. Expansion of the U-Bahn was planned, with a number of lines built or extended; most plans were designed by Albert Speer. The S-Bahn Ringbahn would connect to the subway; existing lines would intersect, with about 30 new stations. Spandau, Gatow, Kladow, Lichterfelde, Marienfelde, Weißensee, Karlshorst and Lankwitz would make up a new line, portions of which later became the U7. In 1930, the Nord-Süd Bahn and Olympiastadion were prioritized. Construction of the Reichskanzlerplatz station, at the Reichstag on Tempelhofer Damm, began during the summer of 1938.

=== World War II ===
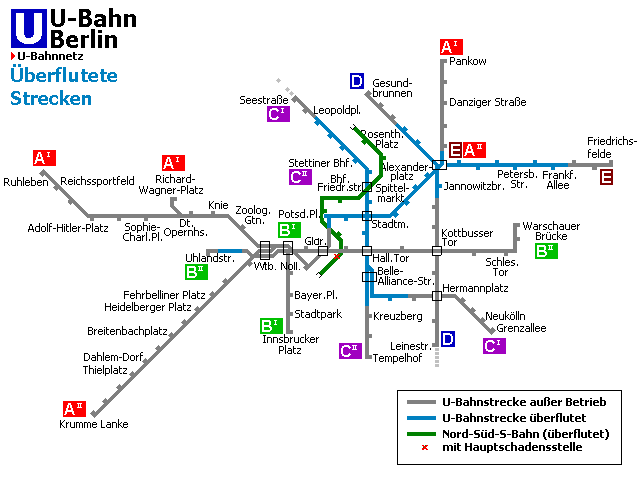
1945 flooding; green and blue indicate flooded sections, and x the main line under the Landwehr Canal.

During the Second World War, U-Bahn, S-Bahn and tram travel increased as car use fell. Most motor vehicles (including buses) were confiscated, and freight shifted to rail. The S-Bahn carried about 700 million passengers in 1942, and the U-Bahn about 405 million. Some U-Bahn stations (Alexanderplatz, Ruhleben, Friedrichstrasse, Gesundbrunnen, Gleisdreieck, Hermannplatz, Moritzplatz, Nollendorfplatz and Seestraße) and tunnels were used as air raid shelters, and shelters in the Alexanderplatz, Gesundbrunnen, Hermannstraße and Waisentunnel stations are still visible. Allied bombs damaged or destroyed large portions of the U-Bahn system; although damage was usually repaired fairly quickly, reconstruction became more difficult as the war continued. On 25 April 1945, the system ground to a halt when its power station failed.

On 19 July 1944, an aerial mine exploded next to the elevated railway viaduct on Bülowstraße; the viaduct was then supported with wood. Bomb damage increased; the U-Bahn's worst day was 3 February 1945, when 27 hits on stations and facilities were recorded. The Halleschen Tor station's ceiling was hit by a bomb, which killed 43 people. The Bayerischer Platz station (with two trains) was destroyed by several bombs, and 63 people died. Thirty-six people died when the northern part of the Moritzplatz station was bombed. The worst bombing was at the Memeler Strasse (present-day Weberwiese) station, where several bombs killed about 200 people. Although the U-Bahn was kept running as long as possible, operations shut down on many sections; the Grenzallee station and its adjoining tunnel were leased to an armaments company. The BVG-owned Unterspree power plant in Ruhleben shut down at six pm on 25 April 1945, and the last two operating lines (Wittenbergplatz to Kaiserdamm and Kaiserdamm to Ruhleben) stopped running.

=== Flooding ===
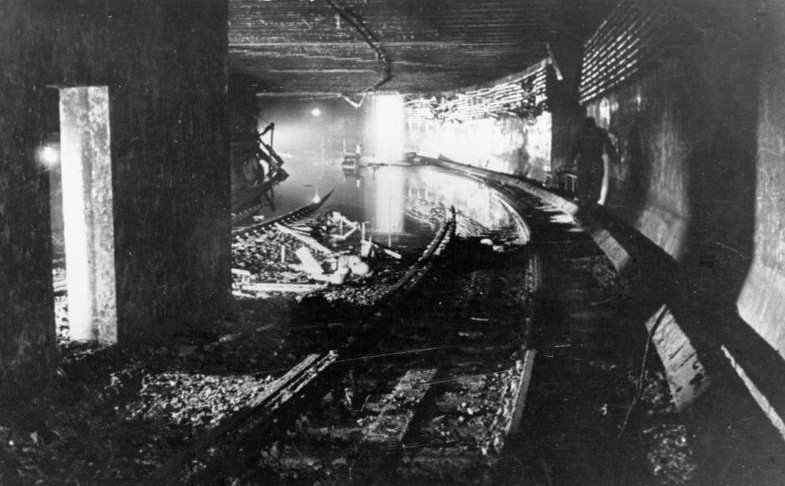
Flooded North–South Tunnel, 1946

Substantial U-Bahn sections were flooded in May 1945. One cause was sabotage with explosives in the Berlin Nord-Süd Tunnel beneath the Landwehr Canal on the morning of 2 May. By the end of the war, several sections were flooded:

- Rosenthaler Platz–Jannowitzbrücke
- Uhlandstraße–Wittenbergplatz
- Wedding–Gardepionierplatz
- Mehringdamm–Kreuzberg
- Alexanderplatz–Potsdamer Platz
- Alexanderplatz–Frankfurter Allee

The cause of the flooding is controversial. It has been attributed to a Nazi order, but insufficient evidence has been found (including who ordered the sabotage or carried it out). How many people died is also uncertain. Some of the bodies found later in the tunnel were wounded soldiers who died before the tunnel flooded, since the S-Bahn tunnel under the Friedrichstrasse station was used in the last days of the war as an emergency military hospital; trains were used as hospital rooms. Some did die in the flooding, but the discrepancy between the number of bodies recovered and the number anticipated has spawned conspiracy theories. Current research suggests less than 200 deaths from the flooding Water discharged into one-third of Berlin's underground, flooding 63 kilometres (39 mi) of tunnels and 25 stations. Another, smaller leak in the tunnel ceiling under the Spree was caused by German forces exploding the Ebertsbrücke Street bridge crossing at the river near the tunnel or, months later, by Soviet military engineers who created the hole while clearing the Spree of large concrete obstacles left by the bridge explosion.

=== Reconstruction ===
During the Battle of Berlin, 437 points and 496 vehicles were damaged. The underground was hit 144 times, and the above-ground lines 33 times.

The sections were quickly reopened beginning on 14 May 1945; most operated as shuttles, due to damaged trains and the lack of crossovers.

- 14 May 1945: Bergstraße – Hermannplatz
- 14 May 1945: Boddinstraße – Schönleinstraße
- 17 May 1945: Knie – Ruhleben
- 17 May 1945: Boddinstraße – Leinestraße
- 18 May 1945: Deutsche Opernhaus – Richard-Wagner-Platz
- 22 May 1945: Rosenthaler Platz – Gesundbrunnen
- 24 May 1945: Frankfurter Allee – Friedrichsfelde
- 26 May 1945: Schönhauser Allee – Alexanderplatz
- 27 May 1945: Schönleinstraße – Kottbusser Tor
- 27 May 1945: Zoologischer Garten – Knie
- 3 June 1945: Kottbusser Tor – Neanderstraße
- 8 June 1945: Thielplatz – Krumme Lanke
- 8 June 1945: Breitenbachplatz – Thielplatz
- 8 June 1945: Hohenzollernplatz – Rüdesheimer Platz
- 9 June 1945: Hermannplatz – Gardepionerplatz
- 11 June 1945: Tempelhof – Belle-Alliance-Straße (closed again on 15 August 1945)
- 11 June 1945: Gardepionerplatz – Belle-Alliance-Straße
- 11 June 1945: Prinzenstraße – Schlesisches Tor
- 13 June 1945: Rosenthaler Platz – Weinmeisterstraße
- 16 June 1945: Weinmeisterstraße – Neanderstraße (Completion of the Line D)
- 16 June 1945: Frankfurter Allee – Petersburger Straße
- 20 June 1945: Schillingstraße – Petersburger Straße
- 21 June 1945: Rüdesheimer Platz – Breitenbachplatz
- 23 June 1945: Schillingstraße – Alexanderplatz (Completion of the Line E)
- 24 June 1945: Nollendorfplatz – Bayerischer Platz
- 24 June 1945: Wittenbergplatz – Kurfürstenstraße
- 4 July 1945: Belle-Alliance-Straße – Hallesches Tor
- 12 July 1945: Seestraße – Kochstraße
- 15 July 1945: Wittenbergplatz – Nürnberger Platz
- 23 July 1945: Wittenbergplatz – Uhlandstraße
- 26 July 1945: Bergstraße – Grenzallee
- 31 July 1945: Märkisches Museum – Potsdamer Platz (skipping a few stations)
- 1 August 1945: Alexanderplatz – Klosterstraße
- 1 August 1945: Pankow – Schönhauser Allee
- 15 September 1945: Halleschem Tor – Kochstraße
- 6 October 1945: Nürnberger Platz – Hohenzollernplatz
- 14 October 1945: Warschauer Brücke – Schlesisches Tor
- 14 October 1945: Prinzenstraße – Hallesches Tor
- 21 October 1945: Wittenbergplatz – Gleisdreieck
- 1 November 1945: Klosterstraße – Märkisches Museum
- 18 November 1945: Gleisdreieck – Potsdamer Platz
- 16 December 1945: Bayerischer Platz – Innsbrucker Platz (Completion of Line B)

Stations still closed included Hausvogteiplatz, Kaiserhof, Nollendorfplatz (elevated), Hallesches Tor and Osthafen.

== Phase 3 ==
=== Berlin Blockade ===
After the Allies implemented a currency reform in the western zones on 20 June 1948, the USSR did the same in the Soviet occupation zone of Germany (including the Soviet sector of Berlin). As a result, the West Mark was also introduced in Berlin. In response, the Soviets occupied the city's transit routes on 24 June in the Berlin Blockade; road, rail and ship connections to the surrounding area were not affected. On 26 June, American general Lucius D. Clay ordered the Berlin Airlift; the airlift continued until the Soviets abandoned the transit routes on 12 May 1949.

=== BVG split (1945–1961) ===
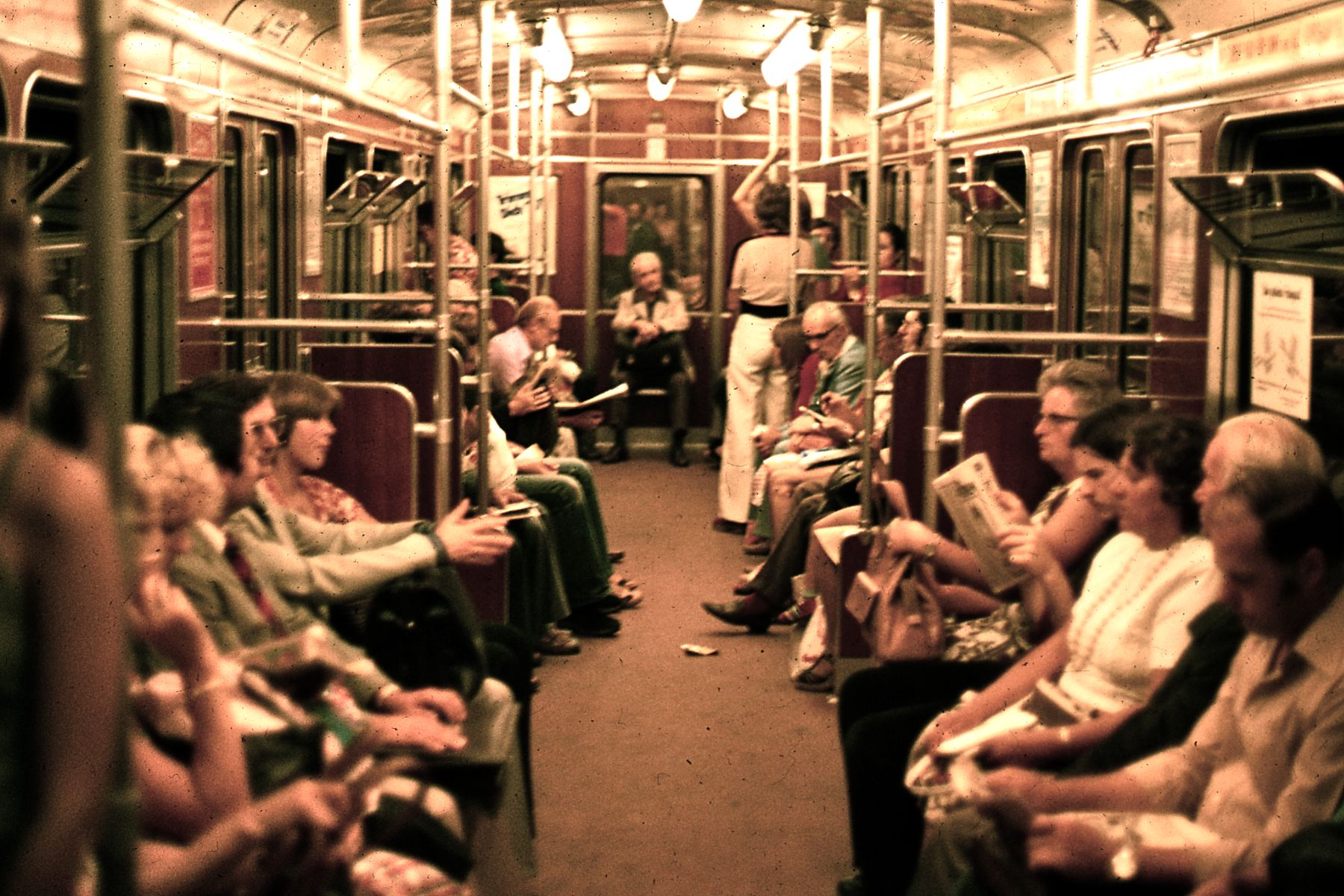
Interior of U-Bahn car, 1977

U- and S-Bahn networks in East Berlin, 1984

Much of the system was damaged or destroyed in the war, but 69.5 km (43.2 mi) of track and 93 stations were in use by the end of 1945 and reconstruction was completed in 1950. Although the network spanned East and West Berlin and residents had freedom of movement, West Berliners increasingly avoided the Soviet sector. In 1953, loudspeakers on the trains warned of the approaching border; East Germans entering the western sector became subject to restrictions by their government. During the June 1953 uprising, the following sections were closed:

- A: Pankow–Gleisdreieck
- B: Schlesisches Tor–Warschauer Brücke
- C: Kochstraße–Reinckendorfer Straße
- D: Gesundbrunnen–Kottbusser Tor
- E: Alexanderplatz–Friedrichstraße

The day after the strike, service on lines A and C with connections to Nordbahnhof and Friedrichstraße. Between 1953 and 1955, the 200-Kilometre Plan was drawn up detailing future U-Bahn development. The first proposed phase was:

- C: Seestraße–Scharnweberstraße (construction began in 1953)
- A: Vinetastraße–Pankow
- E: Friedrichsfelde–Karlshorst
- C^{I}: Grenzallee–Blaschkoallee (built)
- C^{II}: Tempelhof–Teltowkanal (built to Mariendorf)
- D: Leinestraße–Britz

The second phase was:

- C: Scharnweberstraße–Tegel
- D: Gesundbrunnen–Wilhelmsruh
- B: Warschauer Brücke–Bersarinstraße
- C^{I}: Blaschkoallee–Rudow
- D: Gradestraße–Mittenwalder Kleinbahn
- A^{II}: Krumme Lanke–S-Bahnhof Zehlendorf West
- AI: Ruhleben–Spandau
- B^{II}: Uhlandstraße–Halensee
- F: Alexanderplatz–Schloßstraße

The third phase was:

- F: Alexanderplatz–Weißensee
- G: Stegliz–Amrumer Straße (partially built)

Extending the C line from Tegel to Alt-Mariendorf was considered the highest priority, and the northern extension to Tegel opened on 31 May 1958. To circumvent East Berlin and provide rapid transit to densely populated areas in Steglitz, Wedding, and Reinickendorf, a third north–south line was needed. The first section of line G was built between Leopoldplatz and Spichernstraße, with the intention of extending it at both ends. It had been planned to open on 2 September 1961, but was opened on 28 August due to construction of the Berlin Wall.

=== Berlin Wall ===
Map of West and East Berlin, border checkpoints, metro systems

On 15 June 1961, German Democratic Republic Communist Party leader Walter Ulbricht denied East German intentions to wall off West Berlin. On 12 August, however, Ulbricht ordered the construction of a wall around West Berlin. GDR Interior Minister Karl Maron ordered the following changes to the U-Bahn:

- Line A was closed between Thälmannplatz and Gleisdreieck; the physical division cut the line in half. Maron originally wanted West Berlin's Line A to end at Potsdamer Platz, but trains used a crossing between Gleisdreieck and Potsdamer Platz to turn back.
- Line B was closed and blocked between Warschauer Brücke and Schlesisches Tor.
- For lines C and D, West Berlin was asked to pay an annual fee of DM 20 million for trains to run (without stopping) through East Berlin. The former stops became Geisterbahnhöfe (ghost stations), patrolled by armed East German border guards. Passengers could disembark at Friedrichstraße, a designated border crossing. East Berlin retained lines A and E. West Berliners unwilling to fund East Germany boycotted the S-Bahn (owned and operated by the GDR throughout Berlin), transferring wherever possible to the U-Bahn.

=== West Berlin expansion ===
In West Berlin, housing developments in Britz and Rudow necessitated an extension to the C^{I} line; the Grenzallee–Britz-Süd connection opened on 28 September 1963. Guidelines for underground development stipulated that all lines should be linear (without branches), and the extension in the opposite direction from Mehringdamm to Möckernbrücke established "Line H". However, that title was never used, because the 28 February 1966 opening coincided with the renaming of all lines in West Berlin. The new line was instead titled Line 7, with the Tempelhof–Alt-Mariendorf section, which opened the same day, completing the newly designated Line 6. West Berlin abandoned the letter-based system from 1 March 1966, replacing it with the current line numbers 1 to 9.

1966 U-Bahn line renaming
Kleinprofil network				Großprofil network			
B^{I}	→	1	Schlesisches Tor–Ruhleben	C^{II}/C^{I}	→	6	Tegel–Alt-Mariendorf
A^{II}	→	2	Gleisdreieck–Krumme Lanke	C^{I}/H	→	7	Möckernbrücke–Britz-Süd
B^{IV}	→	3	Wittenbergplatz–Uhlandstraße	D	→	8	Gesundbrunnen–Leinestraße
B^{III}	→	4	Nollendorfplatz–Innsbrucker Platz	G	→	9	Leopoldplatz–Spichernstraße
A^{III}	→	5	Deutsche Oper–Richard-Wagner-Platz				

Subvention of West Berlin by the affluent West Germany was plentiful, allowing an extensive expansion of the U-Bahn Network. The U9 from Rathaus Steglitz to Osloer Straße was completed on 30 April 1976, and the U7 was extended westward in four stages from 1971 until 1984. Rathaus Spandau,the current western terminus was reached on 1 October 1984. The BVG took over S-Bahn services in West Berlin on 9 January 1984 and incorporated them into its numbering system; prefixing new S-Bahn line numbers with an "S" (S1,S2,S3). The prefix "U" was added to the existing U-Bahn line numbering. The U8 extension northwards from Gesundbrunnen through the newly built Osloer Straße to Paracelsus-Bad, which opened on 27 April 1987, was the last extension in West Berlin before re-unification.

=== E Line extension ===
Additions to the East Berlin lines were less frequent, although an extension to Karlshorst was planned. The E Line was extended east to Tierpark, opening on 25 June 1973, and an extension was planned to Oberschöneweide (near Treptow). A line along the VnK Railway to Kaulsdorf and an extension to Hönow were planned during the 1980s. The 10.1-kilometre (6.3 mi) extension to Hönow was designed in 1983–84 with nine new stations. Construction began on 1 March 1985, and the first section to open was from Biesdorf-Süd to Elsterwerdaer Platz. The section to Hönow was scheduled to open on 1 July 1989, a few months before the fall of the Berlin Wall.

=== Reunification and reformation of the Berlin U-Bahn ===
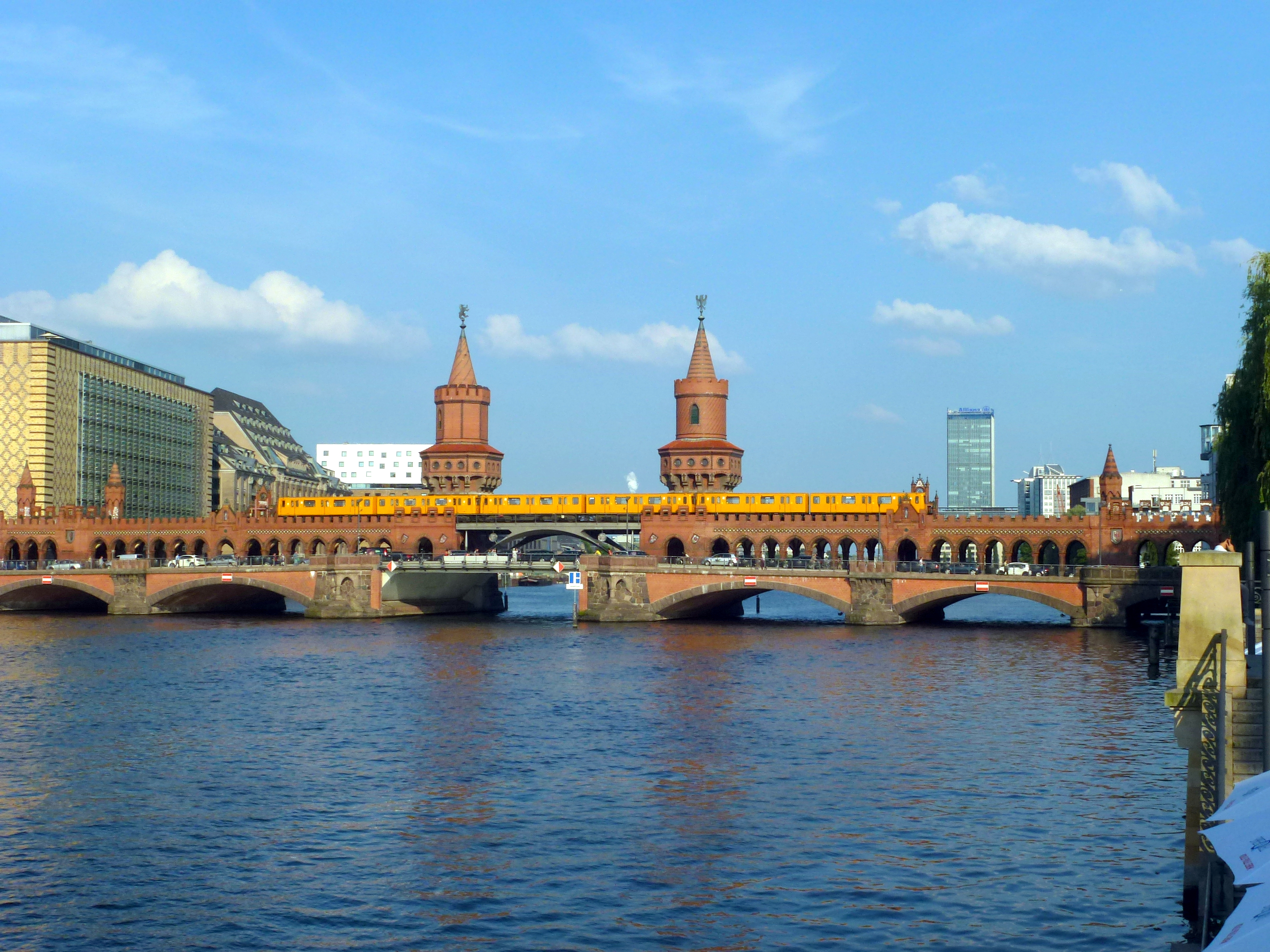
U1 train crossing the Oberbaum Bridge

On 9 November 1989, after months of unrest, travel restrictions on East Germans were lifted. Tens of thousands of East Berliners flooded the border checkpoints, demanding entry into West Berlin. Jannowitzbrücke, a former ghost station, was reopened two days later as an additional crossing. Rosenthaler Platz and Bernauer Straße on the U8 soon followed suit, and all border controls were removed by 1 July 1990.

The U-Bahn lines were renumbered after the adoption of West German currency on 1 July 1990. The E Line became U5 and the A became U2, although U2 was not yet connected to west Berlin and a U2 line ran from Wittenbergplatz to Krumme Lanke. After German reunification on 3 October 1990, the Cold War station names reverted to their original names:

- Dimitroffstraße → Eberswalder Straße
- Otto-Grotewohl-Straße (Thälmannplatz before 1986) → Mohrenstraße
- Marchlewskistraße → Weberwiese
- Albert-Norden-Straße → Kaulsdorf-Nord
- Heinz-Hoffmann-Straße → Neue Grottkauer Straße
- Paul-Verner-Straße → Louis-Lewin-Straße
- Stadion der Weltjugend → Schwarzkopffstraße
- Nordbahnhof → Zinnowitzer Straße (present-day Naturkundemuseum)

In January 1990, fare zones were implemented. Zone A consisted of the BVG Zone in the west, and Zone B consisted of the BVB Zone in the east and the East German area. The latter was abolished in December 1995.

Reconnecting the U2 required extensive work between Wittenbergplatz and Mohrenstraße. The M-Bahn had to be removed, stations (such as Potsdamer Platz) needed to be rebuilt and refurbished, and the tunnel needed to be rebuilt with relaid tracks and the removal of border fortifications. The leases at Nollendorfplatz and Bülowstraße stations, which had been repurposed as a flea market and a Turkish bazaar to store the last West Berlin trams, expired in March 1991. The amalgamated line was reopened on 13 November 1993, and the new Kleinprofil network was reorganized as follows:

- U1 (Schlesisches Tor–Ruhleben) was renumbered U12 and converted to night service.
- U2 (Wittenbergplatz–Krumme Lanke) was extended to Schlesisches Tor and renumbered U1.
- U3 (Wittenbergplatz–Uhlandstraße) was extended to Kottbusser Tor and renumbered U15. In off-peak hours, it continued to use the former U3 routing.
- The U2 section extended the western terminus to Ruhleben.

The above changes left only one connection to reinstate: the U1/U15 line across the Oberbaum Bridge to Warschauer Straße. Reconstruction of the bridge began in 1993 (including the replacement of pillars damaged by World War II air raids), and the Warschauer Straße station was rebuilt after it was partially demolished during the GDR era. The old signal box was also repaired at this time. The line reopened on 14 October 1995, and the Warschauer Brücke station was renamed Warschauer Straße to connect to the S-Bahn station.

=== Expansion ===
In the decade after reunification, three short extensions were made. On the U8, construction of a northern extension from Paracelsus-Bad to Wittenau began in 1985; the line opened on 24 September 1994. In the south, the Leinestraße to Hermannstraße section opened on 13 July 1996. Construction of the Hermannstraße station began in 1992. The U2 was extended from Vinetastraße to Pankow; the connection opened on 16 September 2000. Excavation began in 1989, and construction began in 1997. The Mendelssohn-Bartholdy-Park station began construction as Hafenplatz in 1996, and was completed on 2 October 1998.

The U55 from Berlin Hauptbahnhof to Brandenburger Tor opened on 8 August 2009. It was extended on 4 December 2020 to Alexanderplatz, where it connects with the U5 to Hönow (creating three new stations in the city center: Berliner Rathaus, Museumsinsel and Unter den Linden).

== Opening dates ==
This is the complete history and summary of the openings for the Berlin U-Bahn:

18 February 1902: Stralauer Tor – Potsdamer Platz; 11 March 1902: Potsdamer Platz – Zoologischer Garten; 25 March 1902: Stralauer Tor – Zoologischer Garten; 17 August 1902: Stralauer Tor – Warschauer Brücke; 14 December 1902: Zoologischer Garten – Knie; 14 May 1906: Knie – Wilhelmplatz; 29 March 1908: Bismarckstraße – Reichskanzlerplatz; 1 October 1908: Potsdamer Platz – Spittelmarkt; 1 December 1910: Nollendorfplatz – Hauptstraße; 8 June 1913: Reichskanzlerplatz – Stadion; 1 July 1913: Spittelmarkt – Alexanderplatz; 27 July 1913: Alexanderplatz – Nordring; 12 October 1913: Wittenbergplatz – Uhlandstraße; 12 October 1913: Wittenbergplatz – Thielplatz; 30 January 1923: Stettiner Bahnhof – Hallesches Tor; 8 March 1923: Stettiner Bahnhof – Seestraße; 19 April 1924: Hallesches Tor – Gneisenaustraße; 14 December 1924: Gneisenaustraße – Hasenheide; 14 February 1926: Belle-Alliance-Straße – Kreuzberg; 11 April 1926: Hasenheide – Bergstraße; 24 October 1926: Gleisdreieck – Kurfürstenstraße – Wittenbergplatz; 17 July 1927: Boddinstraße – Schönleinstraße; 10 September 1927: Kreuzberg – Flughafen; 12 February 1928: Schönleinstraße – Kottbusser Tor; 6 April 1928: Kottbusser Tor – Neanderstraße; 4 August 1929: Boddinstraße – Leinestraße; 22 December 1929: Flughafen – Tempelhof (Südring); 22 December 1929: Stadion – Ruhleben; 22 December 1929: Thielplatz – Krumme Lanke	18 April 1930: Neanderstraße – Gesundbrunnen; 29 June 1930: Nordring – Pankow (Vinetastraße); 21 December 1930: Alexanderplatz – Friedrichsfelde; 21 December 1930: Bergstraße – Grenzallee; 3 May 1956: Seestraße – Kurt-Schumacher-Platz; 31 May 1958: Kurt-Schumacher-Platz – Tegel; 28 August 1961: Leopoldplatz – Spichernstraße; 28 September 1963: Grenzallee – Britz-Süd; 28 February 1966: Tempelhof – Alt-Mariendorf; 28 February 1966: Mehringdamm – Möckernbrücke; 2 January 1970: Britz-Süd – Zwickauer Damm; 29 January 1971: Spichernstraße – Walther-Schreiber-Platz; 29 January 1971: Möckernbrücke – Fehrbelliner Platz; 1 July 1972: Zwickauer Damm – Rudow; 25 June 1973: Friedrichsfelde – Tierpark; 30 September 1974: Walther-Schreiber-Platz – Rathaus Steglitz; 30 April 1976: Leopoldplatz – Osloer Straße; 7 October 1977: Gesundbrunnen – Osloer Straße; 28 April 1978: Fehrbelliner Platz – Richard-Wagner-Platz; 1 October 1980: Richard-Wagner-Platz – Rohrdamm; 1 October 1984: Rohrdamm – Rathaus Spandau; 27 April 1987: Osloer Straße – Paracelsus-Bad; 1 July 1988: Tierpark – Elsterwerdaer Platz; 1 July 1989: Elsterwerdaer Platz – Hönow; 24 September 1994: Paracelsus-Bad – Wittenau; 13 July 1996: Leinestraße – Hermannstraße; 16 September 2000: Vinetastraße – Pankow; 8 August 2009: Hauptbahnhof – Brandenburger Tor; 4 December 2020: Brandenburger Tor – Alexanderplatz
