= Friedrichsfelde =

- Quarter of Berlin
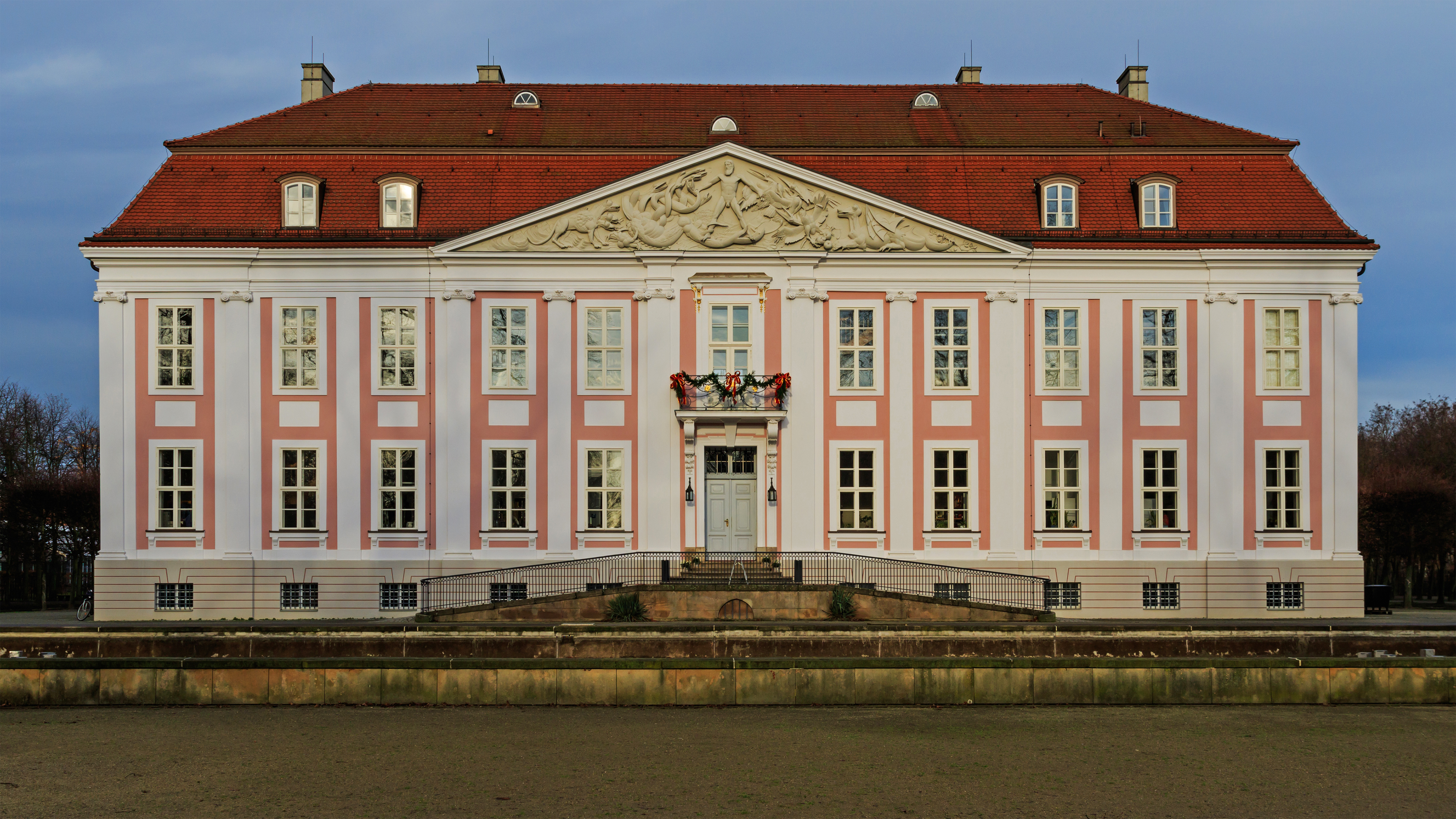
- Friedrichsfelde Castle

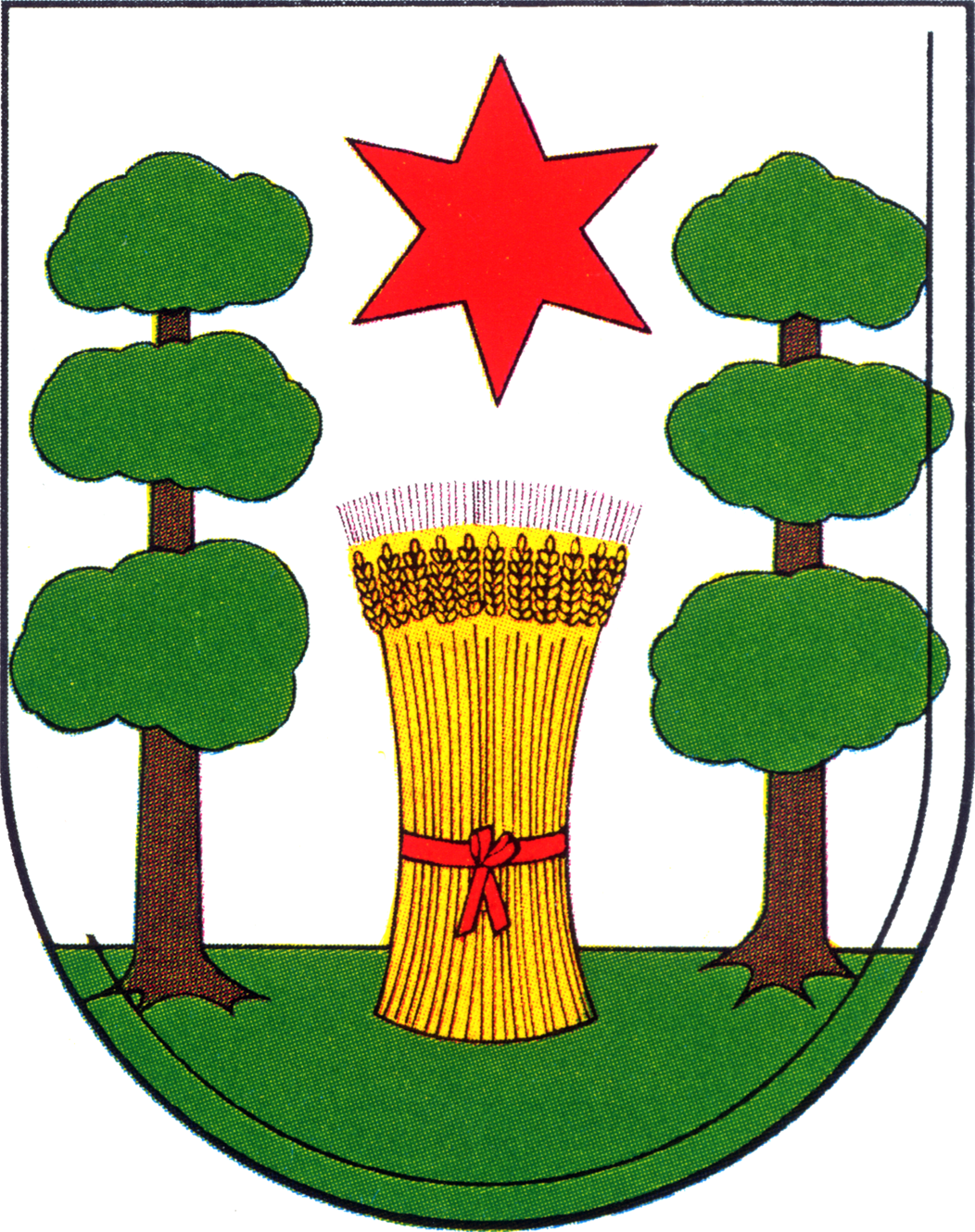
- Coat of arms

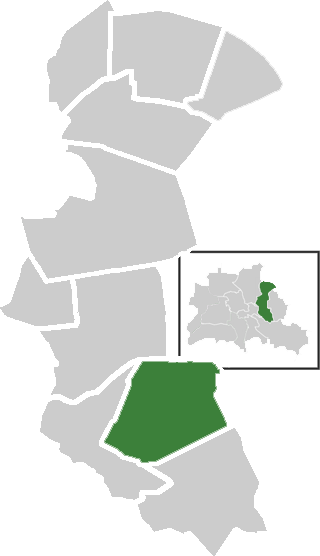
- Location of Friedrichsfelde in Lichtenberg district and Berlin
- Interactive map of Friedrichsfelde
- Location within Germany Location within Berlin
- Coordinates: 52°30′21″N 13°31′09″E
- Country: Germany
- State: Berlin
- City: Berlin
- Borough: Lichtenberg
- Founded: 1265

Area
  - Total: 5.55 km^{2} (2.14 sq mi)
- Elevation: 50 m (160 ft)

Population (2024-12-31)
  - Total: 58,098
  - Density: 10,500/km^{2} (27,100/sq mi)
- Time zone: UTC+01:00 (CET)
  - Summer (DST): UTC+02:00 (CEST)
- Postal codes: 10315, 10319
- Vehicle registration: B
- Website: Official website

Friedrichsfelde (German pronunciation: [fʁiːdʁɪçsˈfɛldə]) is a German locality (Ortsteil) within the borough (Bezirk) of Lichtenberg, Berlin.

== History ==
The locality was first mentioned in a document of 1265 with the name of Rosenfelde. In 1699 it was renamed Friedrichsfelde after the Prince-Elector Frederick III of Brandenburg. It was an autonomous municipality of the former Niederbarnim district until 1920, when it merged into Berlin under the "Greater Berlin Act".

== Geography ==
Located in eastern suburb of Berlin, Friedrichsfelde borders with the localities of Lichtenberg, Rummelsburg, Karlshorst, Marzahn and Biesdorf (both in Marzahn-Hellersdorf district). In its south-eastern corner is situated the "Tierpark Berlin", the second zoo of the city.

== Transport ==
As urban rail, Friedrichsfelde is crossed both by S-Bahn and U-Bahn. The stations serving the locality are Friedrichsfelde Ost (lines S5, S7, S75), Friedrichsfelde (U5), Tierpark (U5) and partly Rummelsburg (S3). The quarter is also served by the tramway lines M17, 27 and 37 and traversed by the federal highways B1 and B5.

== Photogallery ==
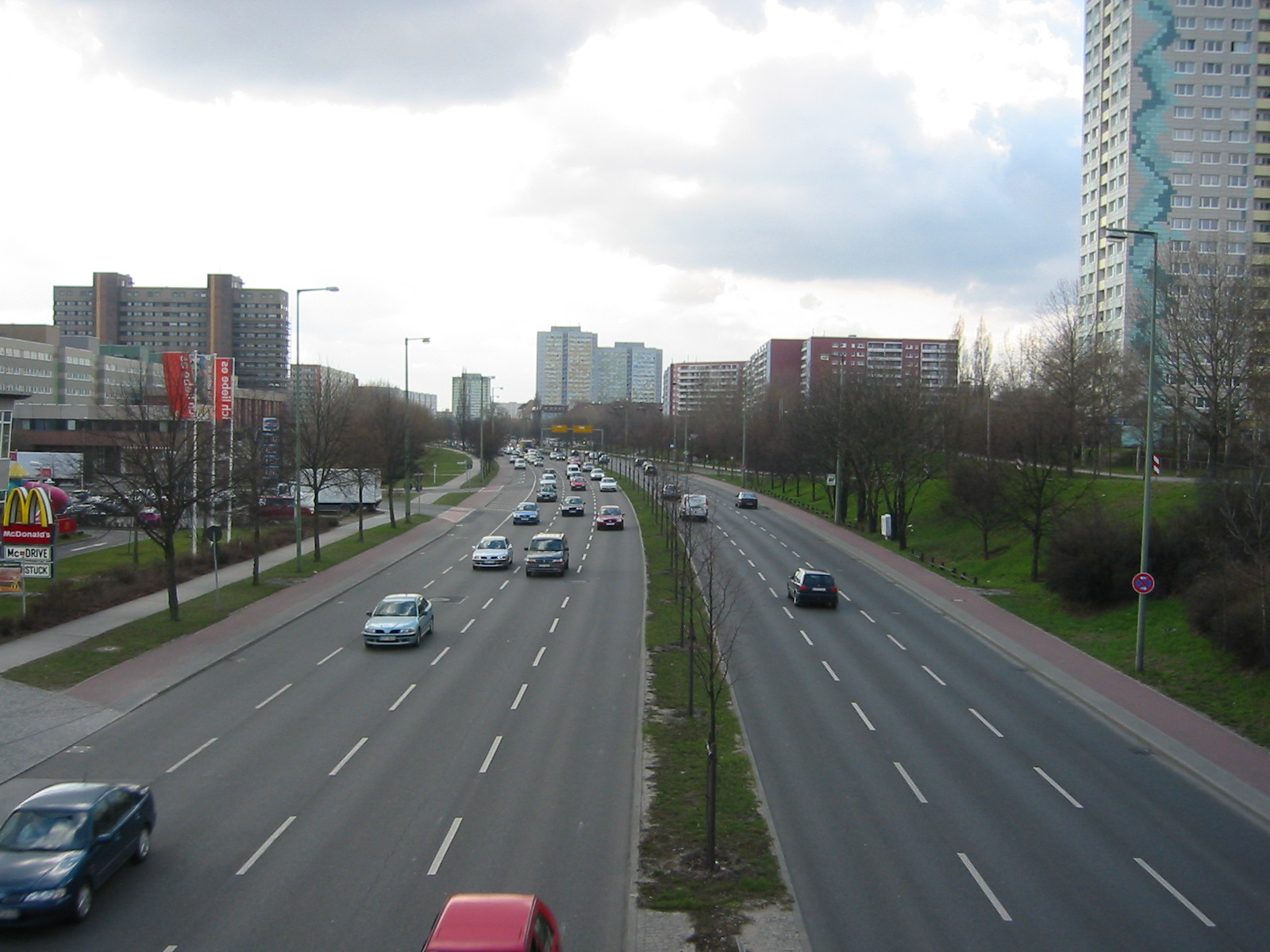
B1/B5 road across the locality

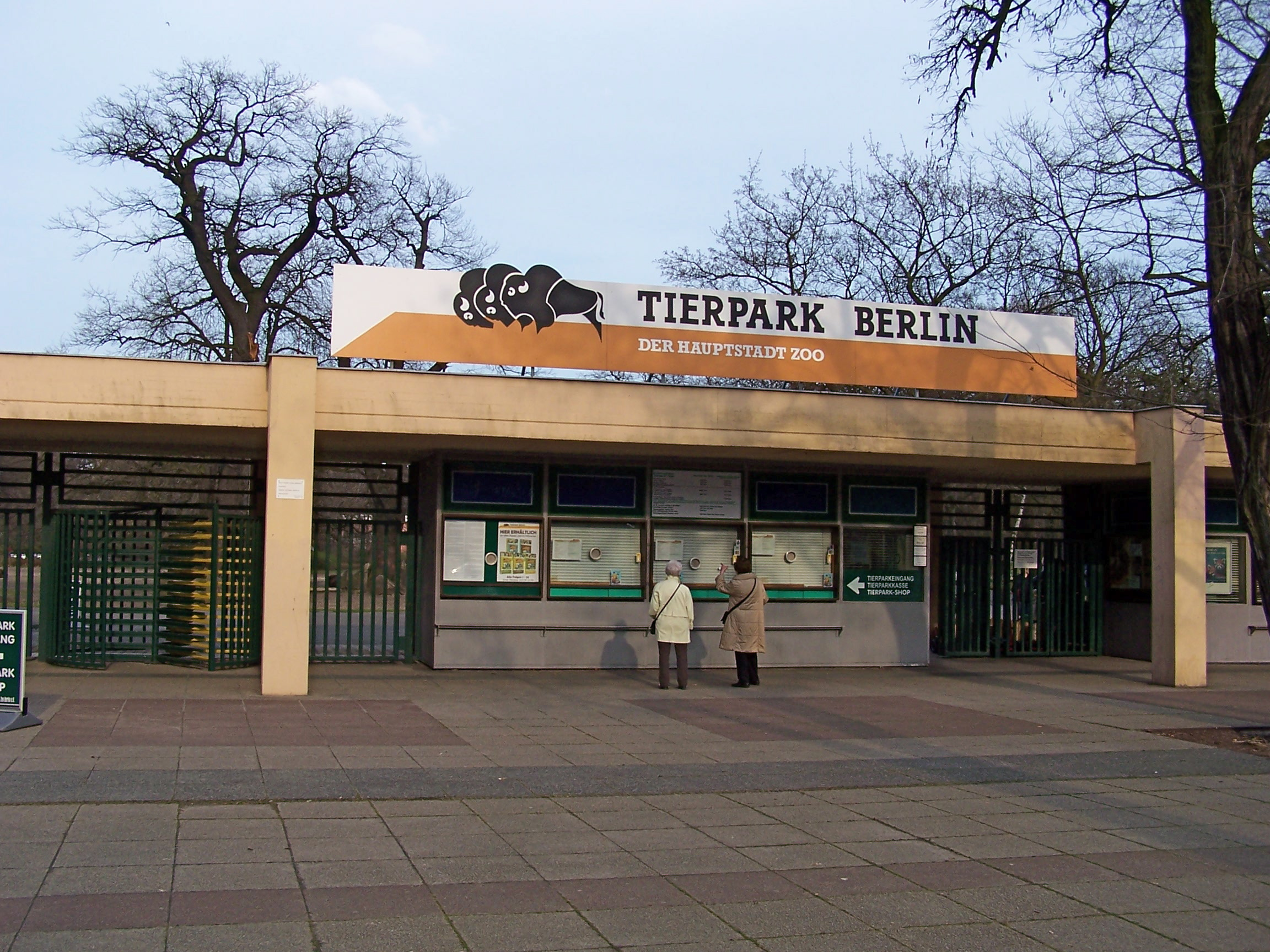
Main entrance of Tierpark

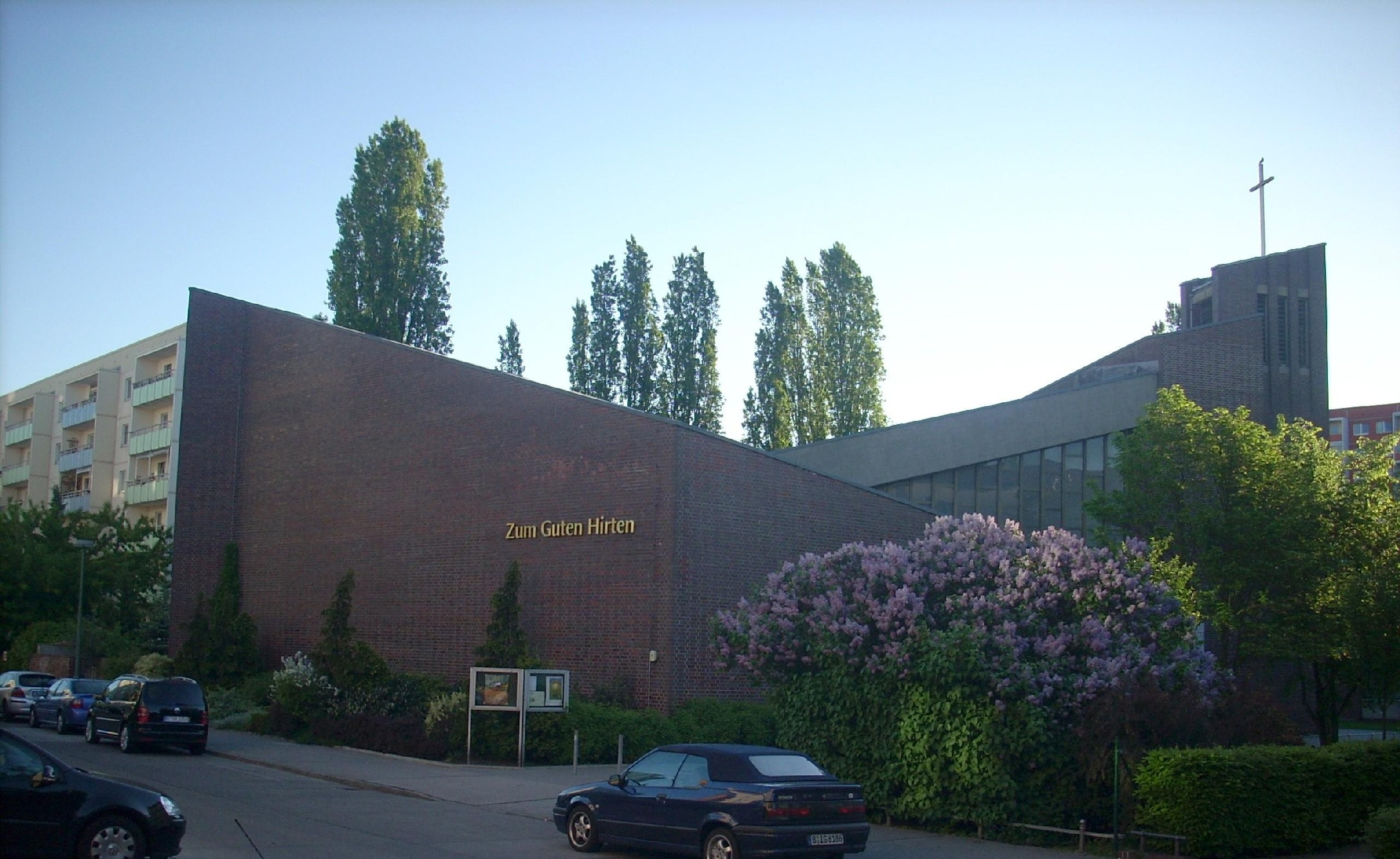
Catholic church
