= Biesdorf (Berlin) =

- Quarter of Berlin
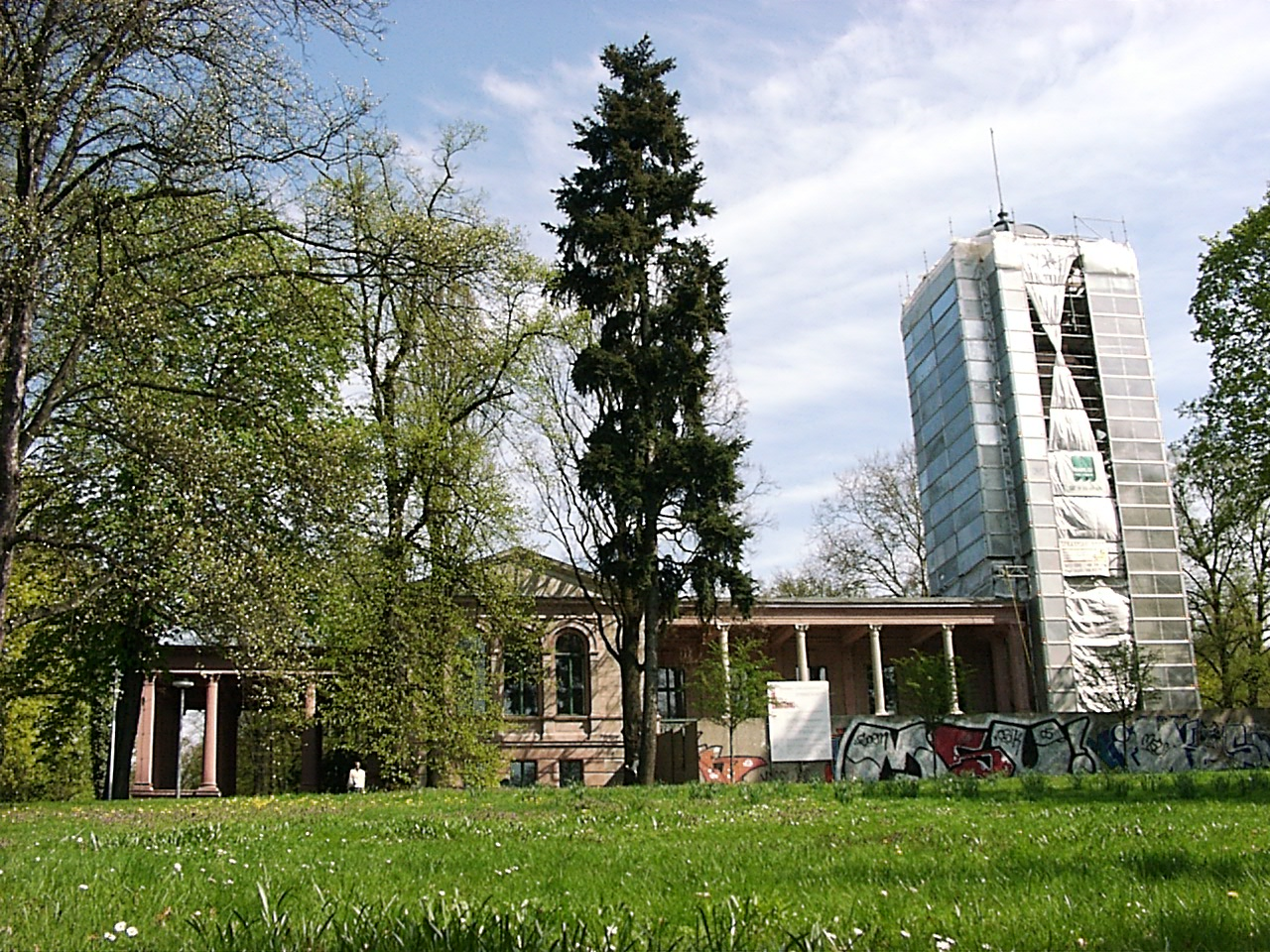
- Biesdorf Castle

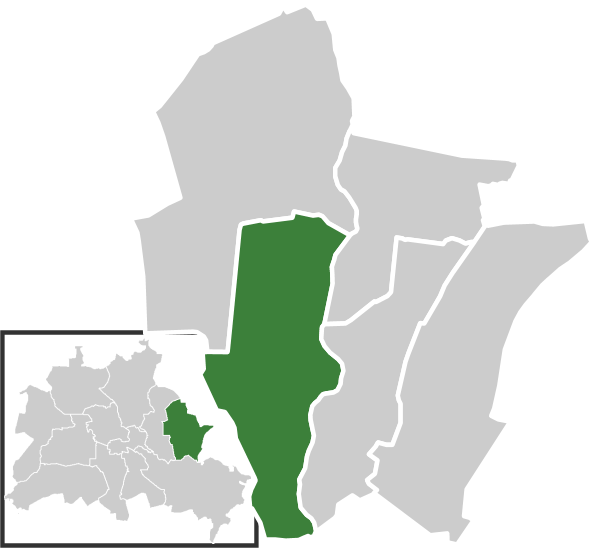
- Location of Biesdorf in Marzahn-Hellersdorf district and Berlin
- Interactive map of Biesdorf
- Location within Germany Location within Berlin
- Coordinates: 52°30′33″N 13°33′19″E
- Country: Germany
- State: Berlin
- City: Berlin
- Borough: Marzahn-Hellersdorf
- Founded: 1375
- Subdivisions: 2 zones

Area
  - Total: 12.4 km^{2} (4.8 sq mi)
- Elevation: 50 m (160 ft)

Population (2024-12-31)
  - Total: 30,959
  - Density: 2,500/km^{2} (6,470/sq mi)
- Time zone: UTC+01:00 (CET)
  - Summer (DST): UTC+02:00 (CEST)
- Postal codes: 12683
- Vehicle registration: B

Biesdorf (German pronunciation: [ˈbiːsˌdɔʁf]) is a locality (Ortsteil) within the Berlin borough (Bezirk) of Marzahn-Hellersdorf. Until 2001 it was part of the former borough of Marzahn.

== History ==
Biesdorf was mentioned for the first time in a document of 1375, the "Landbuch" (land book) of Charles IV, with its ancient names Bysterstorff and/or Bisterstorff. Until 1920 it was a municipality of the former Niederbarnim district, merged in Berlin with the "Greater Berlin Act", and part of Lichtenberg district until 1933. From 1949 to 1990, during the "Cold War", it was part of East Berlin. At the end of May / beginning of June 1945, 36 houses in Biesdorf were confiscated from senior officials from authorities and cultural institutions, and several properties were returned in October 1946. The first mayor of post-war Berlin, Arthur Werner, who was deployed by the Soviets on May 17, 1945, moved into his official residence here. During the same period, parts of Biesdorf (Dillinger Weg, Frankenholzer Weg, Püttlinger Straße) were confiscated for the Red Army and separated from the remaining parts by a wooden wall. The Red Army moved into quarters there and in the former forced labor camp (Frankenholzer Weg). It was only in the 1950s that the Soviet Armed Forces left the houses in Biesdorf. The site of the former forced labor camp was later taken over by the National People's Army and stationed there by the Erich-Weinert-Ensemble, an institution of the Ministry of National Defense of the GDR, in breach of the Four Powers Agreement. The Biesdorf mansion was confiscated by the Soviet Armed Forces, and a mourning hall for fallen or deceased Soviet soldiers was set up in the rooms, but at times the rooms were also used for other types of celebrations such as medals' awarding and May 1. The dead soldiers were temporarily buried in the estate park, after the Soviet Army moved out, the dead were then transferred to Soviet military cemeteries.

== Geography ==
=== Overview ===
Located in the eastern suburb of Berlin, Biesdorf border with Marzahn, Hellersdorf, Kaulsdorf, Friedrichsfelde, Karlshorst (both in Lichtenberg district) and Köpenick (in Treptow-Köpenick). Its tallest point is a hill, Biesdorfer Höhe, of 82 amsl, part of the Wuhletal park. Biesdorf counts the lakes of Biesdorfer Baggersee, Dreiecksee, Wuhleteich and Wuhlebecken, on the river Wuhle, that separates it from Kaulsdorf. Little portions of Tierpark and Erholungspark Marzahn belongs to Biesdorf.

=== Subdivision ===
Biesdorf is divided into 2 zones (Ortslagen):

- Biesdorf-Nord
- Biesdorf-Süd

== Transport ==
As urban rail, the locality is served both by S-Bahn and U-Bahn, at the stations of Biesdorf (line S5), Wuhletal, (S5 and U5), Biesdorf-Süd (U5) and Elsterwerdaer Platz (U5). "Allee der Kosmonauten", a road in Marzahn bordering with Biesdorf, is crossed by the tramway lines M8 and 18.

As road transport, Biesdorf is crossed by the federal highways B1 and B5.

== Photogallery ==
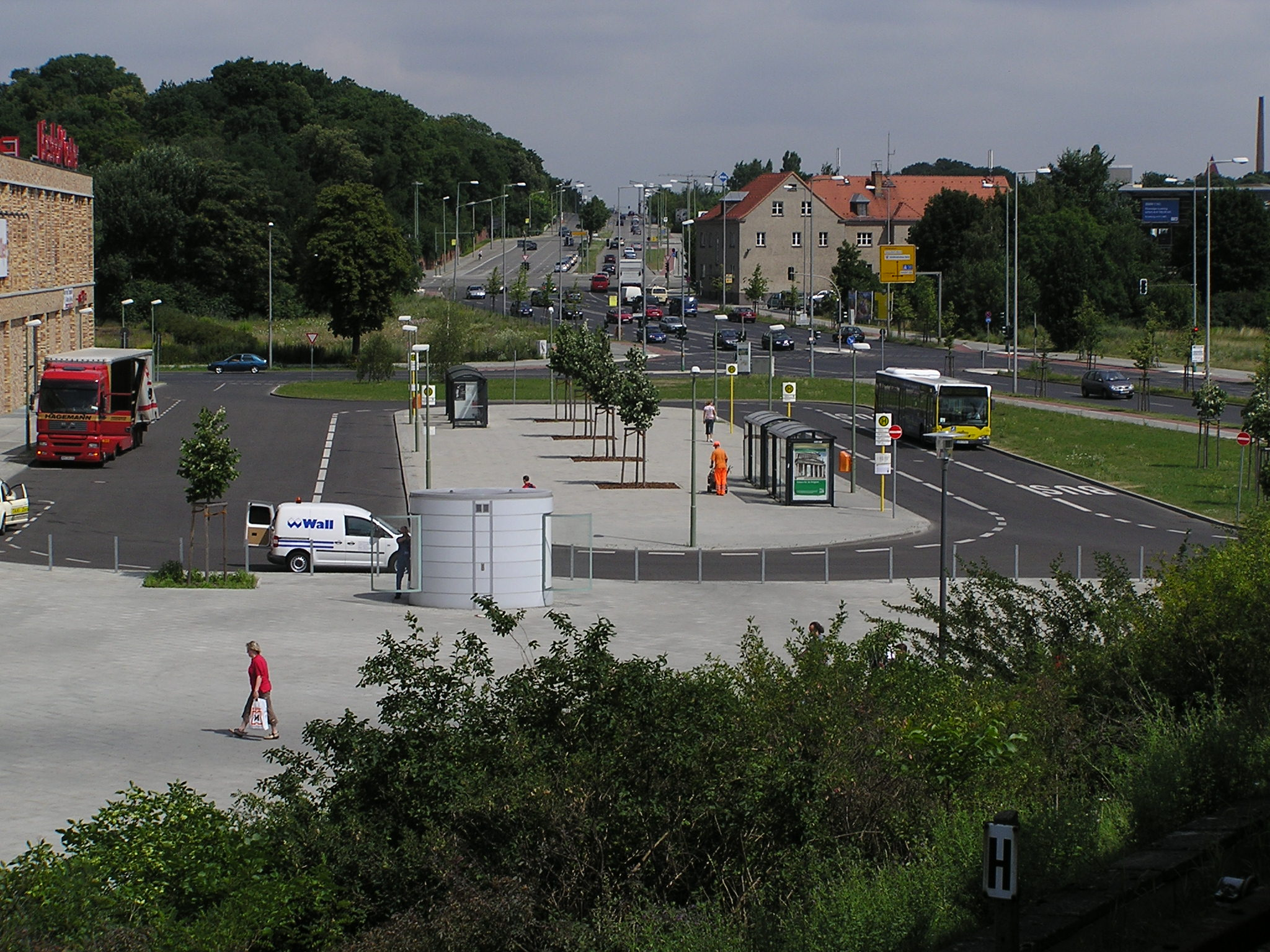
The central Elsterwerdaer Platz

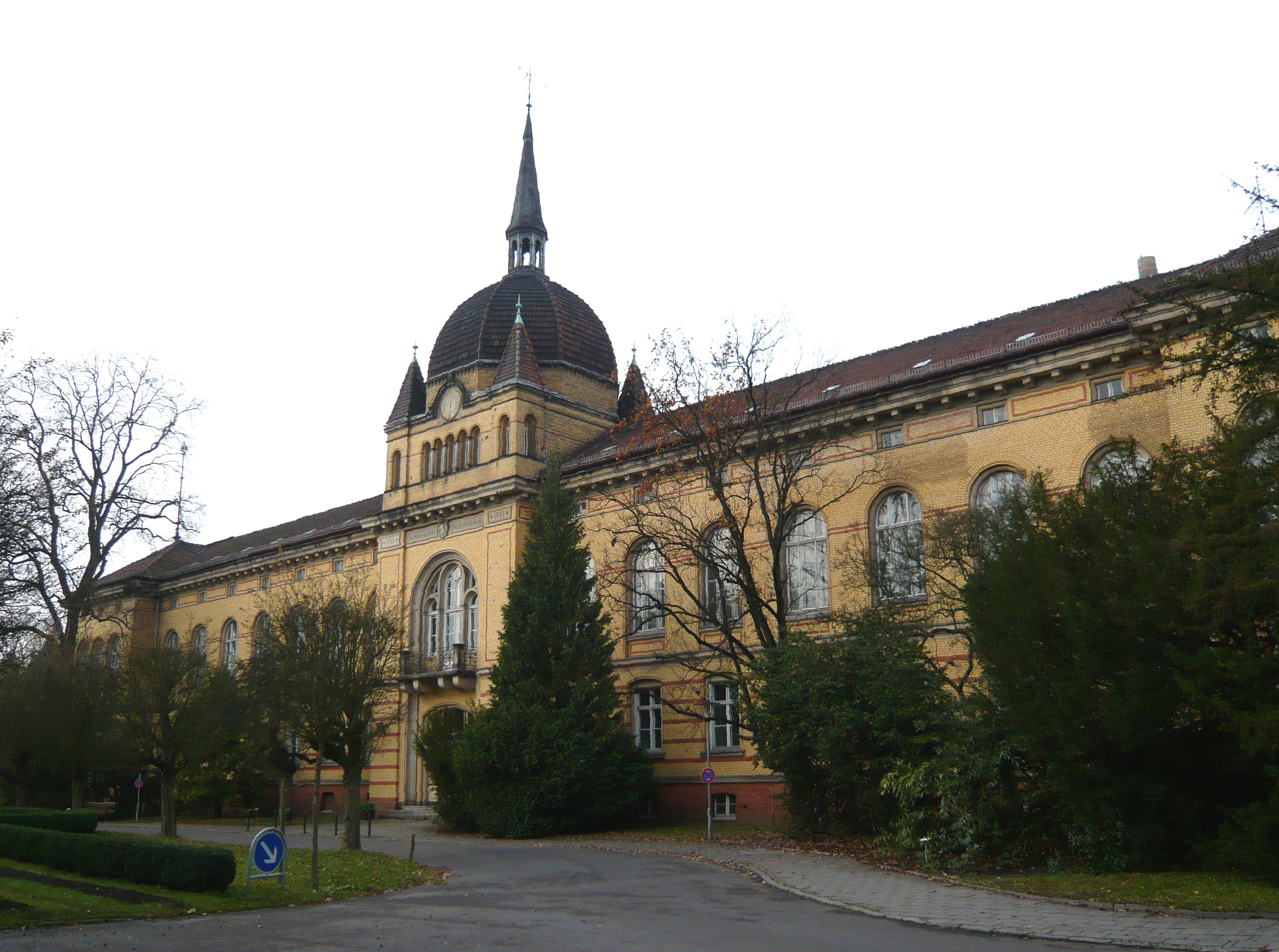
"Wilhelm Griesinger" Hospital

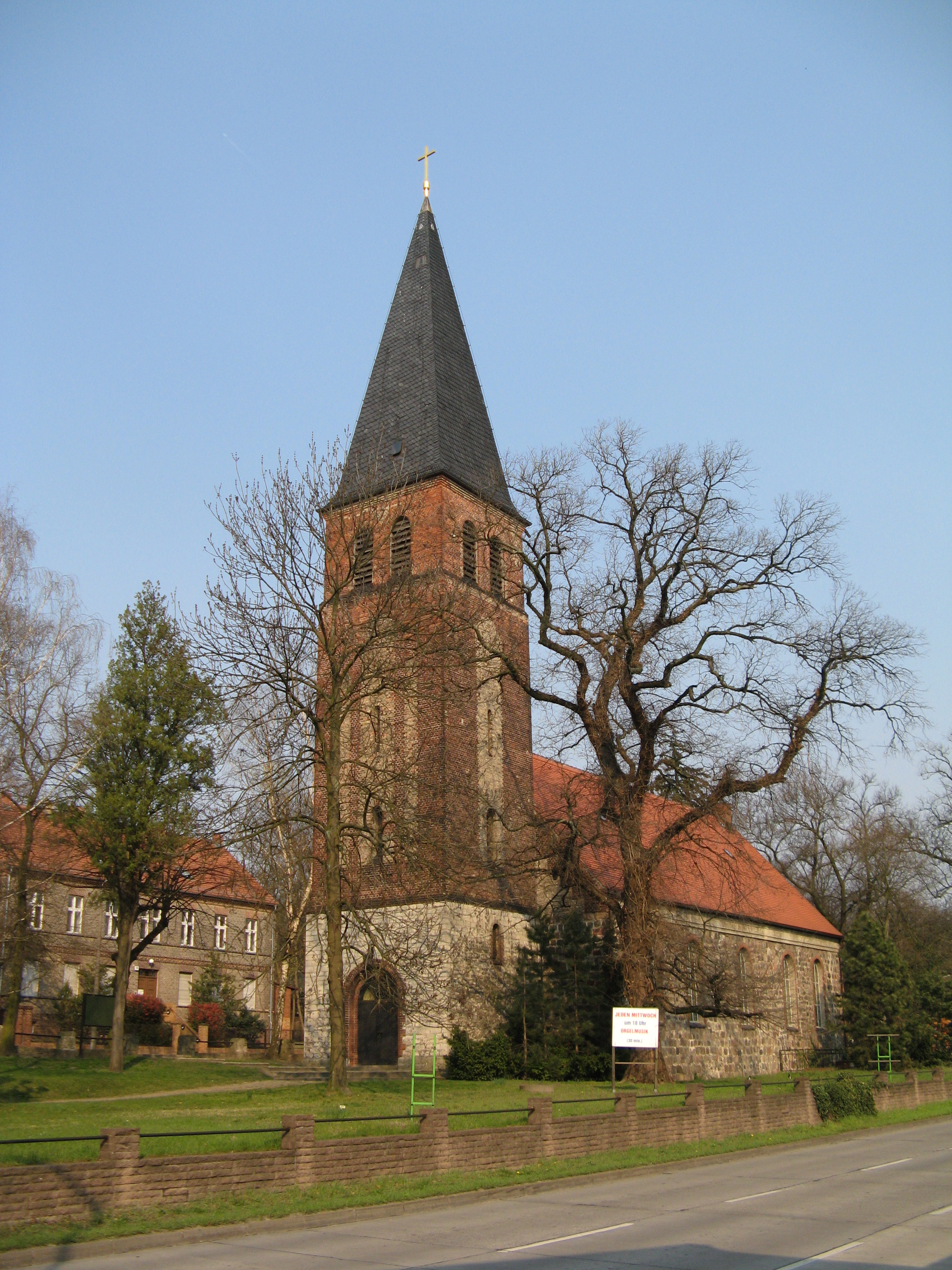
Village church

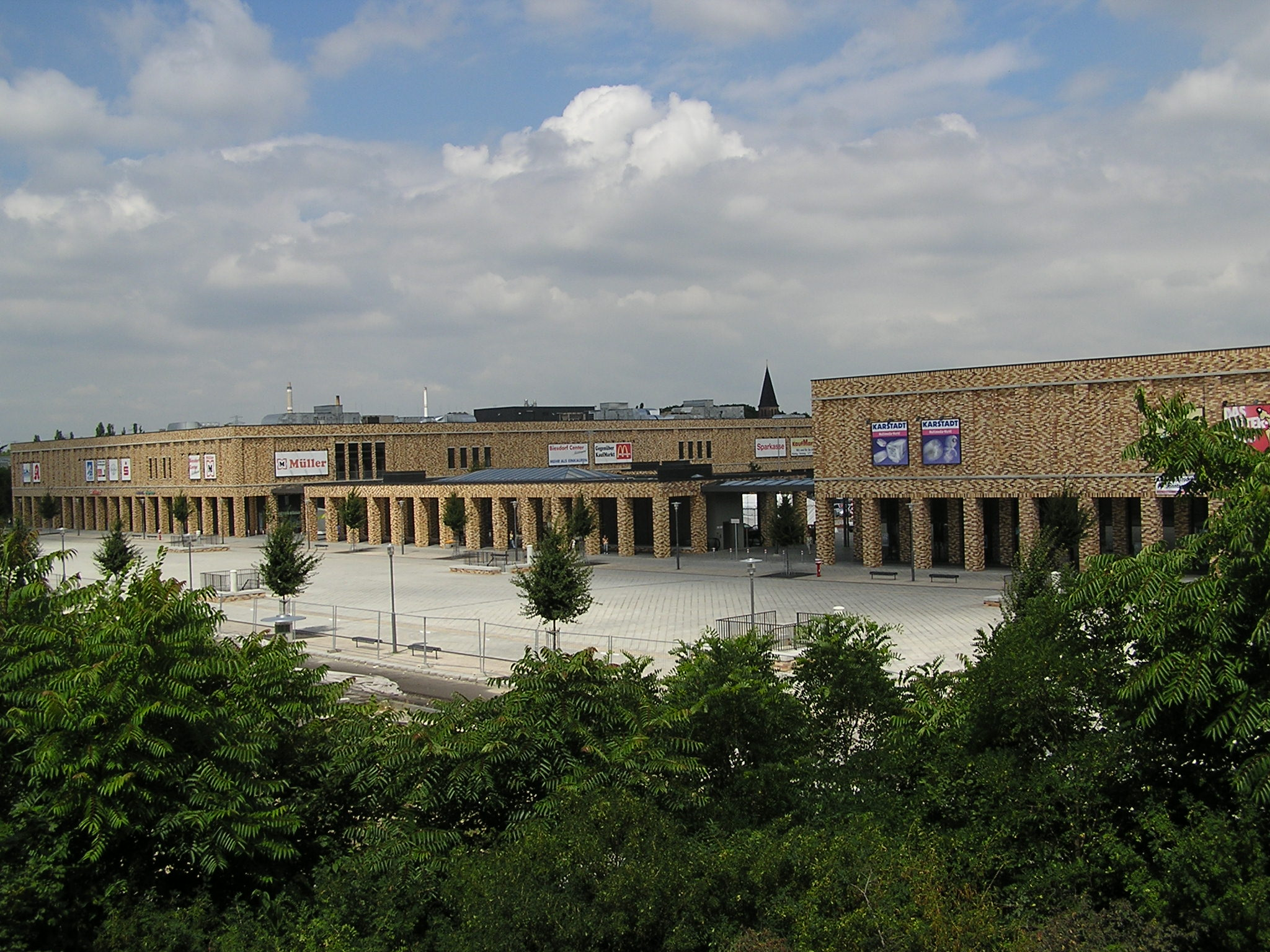
Biesdorf-Center

== Personalities ==
- Arndt Bause (1936–2003)
- Inka Bause (b. 1968)
- Hans Brass (1885–1959)
- Robert Huth (b. 1984)
- Hardy Krüger (b. 1928)
- Otto Nagel (1894–1967)
- Arno Philippsthal (1887–1933)

== Literature ==
- Günther Peters: "Biesdorf – mitten in Berlin". Kai Homilius Verlag, Berlin 2000, ISBN 3-89706-102-3
- Bernd Maether: "Schloss Biesdorf". Kai Homilius Verlag, Berlin 2002, ISBN 3-931121-41-0
