= Biesdorf-Süd station =

Station of the Berlin U-Bahn

Coordinates: 52°29′59″N 13°32′47″E

Biesdorf-Süd
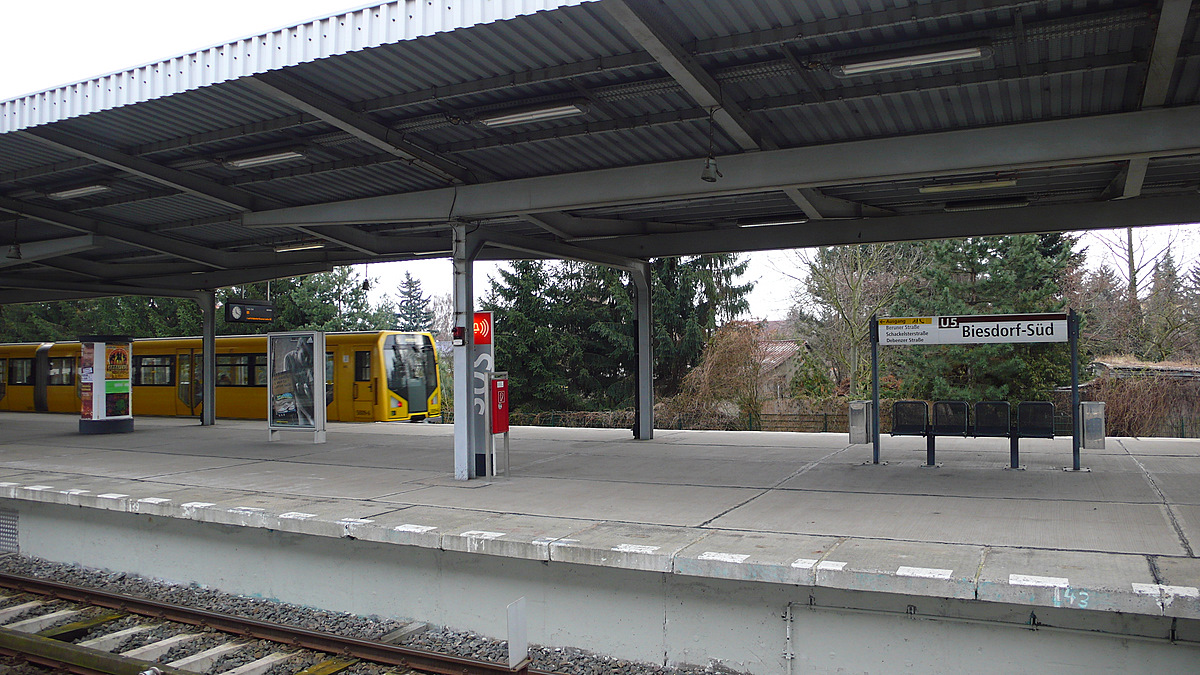

General information
- Line: U5
- Platforms: 2 island platforms
- Tracks: 4

Construction
- Structure type: Surface Level

History
- Opened: 1 July 1988

Services
Preceding station	Berlin U-Bahn	Following station
Tierpark towards Berlin Hbf	U5	Elsterwerdaer Platz towards Hönow

Biesdorf-Süd is a surface level Berlin U-Bahn station located on the U5 line of the U-Bahn Berlin subway in the neighborhood of Biesdorf in Berlin, Germany. The station opened on 1 July, 1988. After Tierpark, It comes above ground. The next station is Elsterwerdaer Platz. North of the U-Bahn station is the Biesdorfer Baggersee.
