= Biesdorfer Baggersee =

Excavation lake in Berlin, Germany

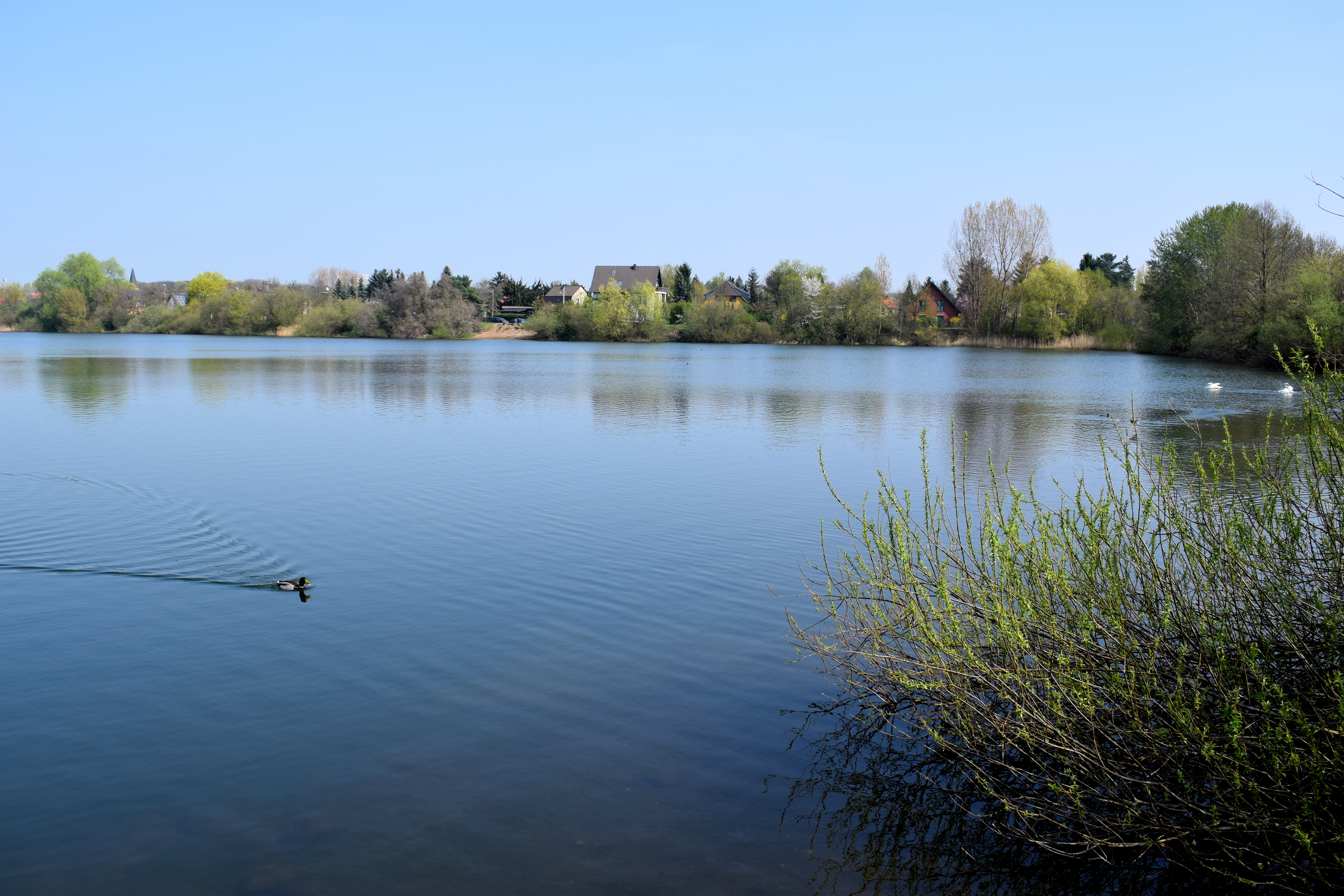
- Biesdorfer Baggersee in 2017

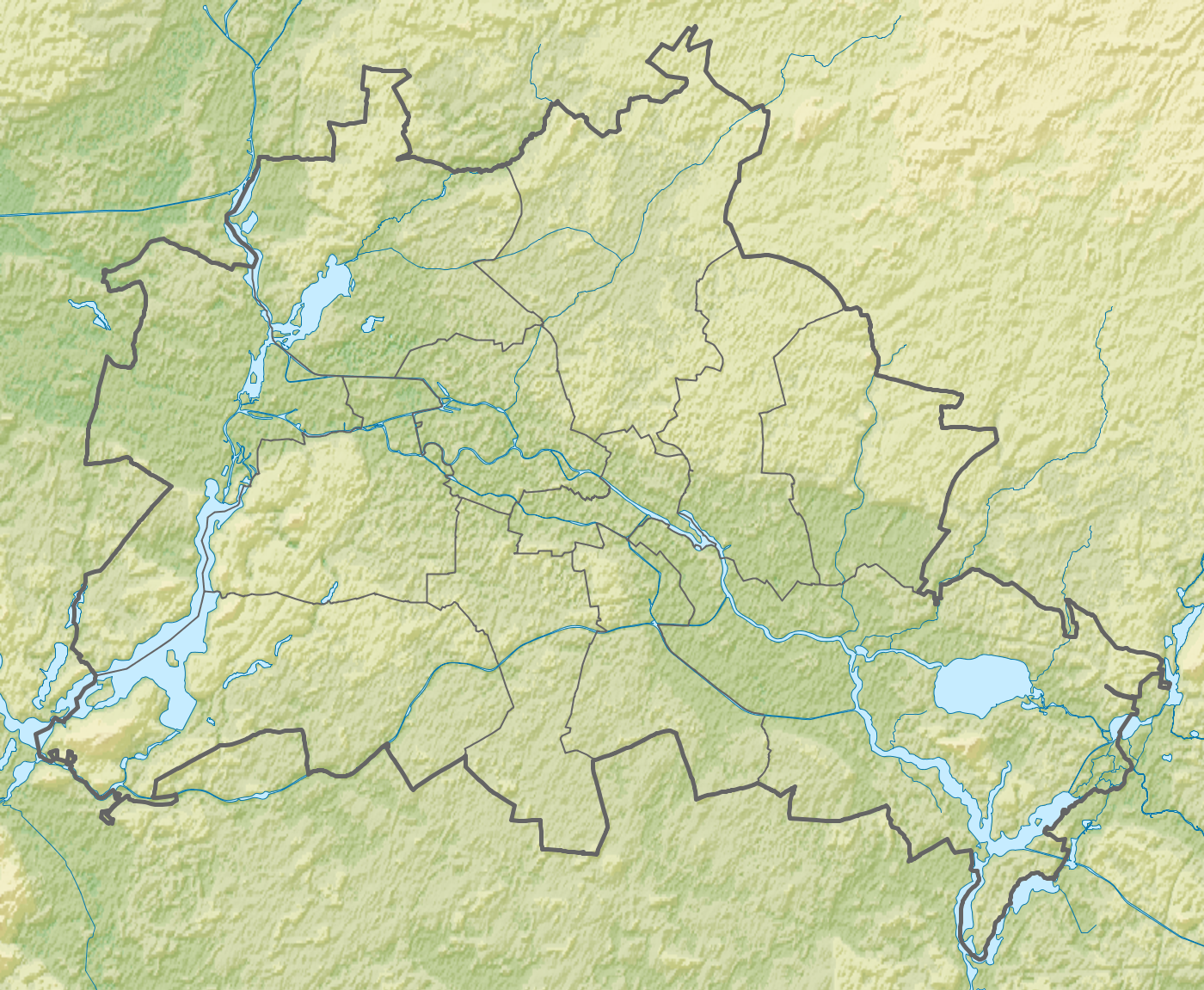
- Location within Berlin Location within Germany
- Location: Biesdorf, Marzahn-Hellersdorf, Berlin
- Coordinates: 52°30′12″N 13°32′56″E
- Basin countries: Germany
- Max. length: 0.470 km (0.292 mi)
- Max. width: 0.260 km (0.162 mi)
- Surface area: 7.62 ha (18.8 acres)

The Biesdorfer Baggersee is an excavation lake located in the locality (Ortsteil) of Biesdorf within the borough (Bezirk) of Marzahn-Hellersdorf in Berlin, Germany. It is one of the largest quarry ponds in the Berlin area.

== Geography ==
Biesdorfer Baggersee lies in a largely built-up area. A large filter system for rainwater is located a few meters west of its bank. A 1,400 m (4,600 ft) long path runs around the quarry pond, which has several access points to the lake. The shore is overgrown with reeds, trees, and other vegetation on most parts of the lake. Only in the north is the shore area protected from entering by a fence. In the south of the lake, there are two separate sandy beaches, which are not approved for swimming. Several wooden loungers were installed at the lake and a volleyball court was created. The species of fish commonly found in the lake are carp, pike and roach.

== History ==
Biesdorfer Baggersee was originally created in the 19th century as a gravel pit, from which sand and gravel were removed for the new development areas in the area. When mining stopped and all machines were removed, the pit filled with groundwater and rainwater. Today, Biesdorfer Baggersee is a biotope in which many animals and plants live.

== Usage ==
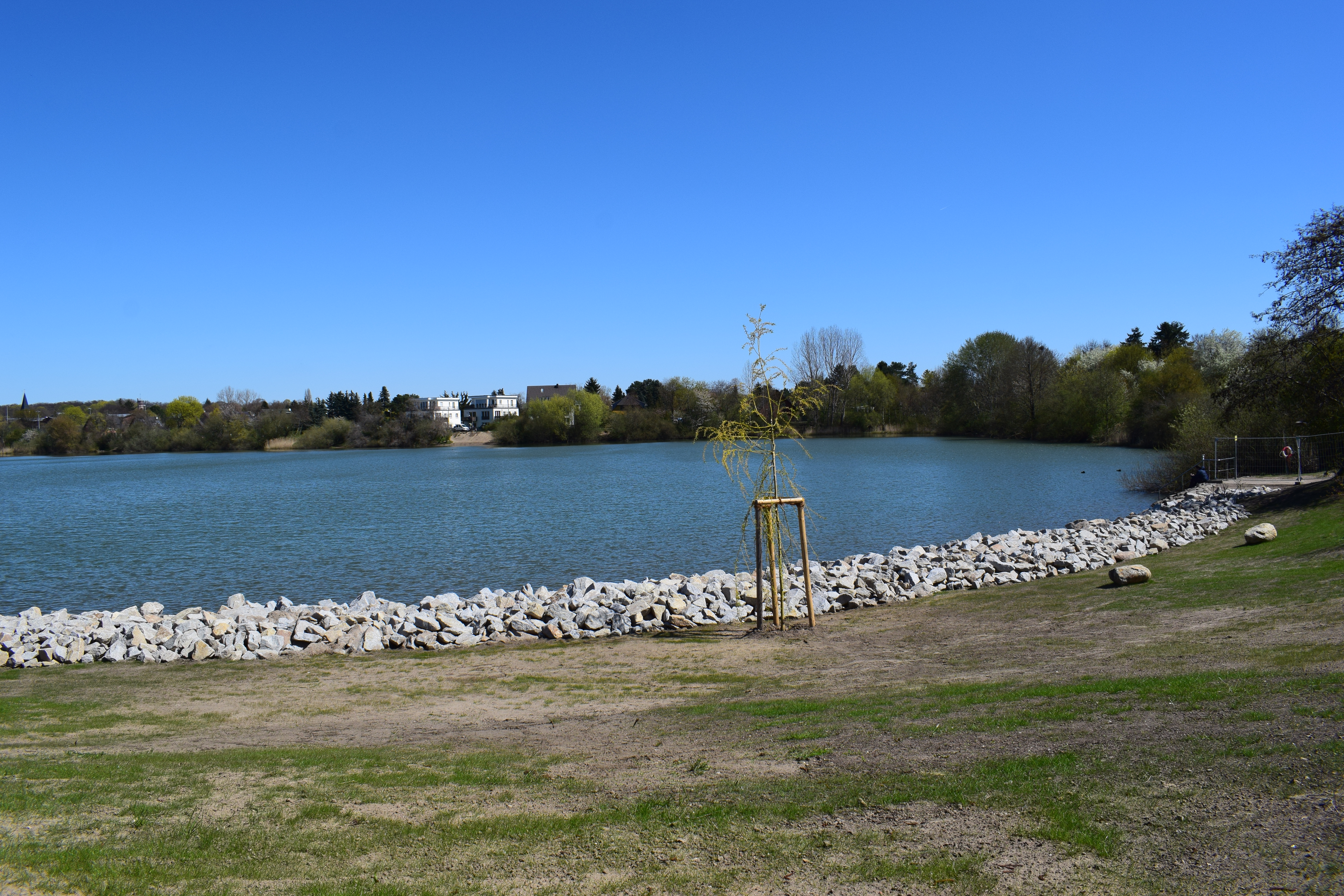
Biesdorfer Baggersee in 2021

In the Summer months, Biesdorfer Baggersee is used as a bathing lake, although it is not open to bathing due to the poor water quality.

In 2020, there was also a lively rush here regardless of social distancing rules. In the spring of 2021, the district office made the bathing area unusable by creating a rock embankment between the lawn and the lake for around 90,000 euros.
