= Tierpark station (Berlin U-Bahn) =

Station of the Berlin U-Bahn

Coordinates: 52°29′53″N 13°31′22″E

Tierpark
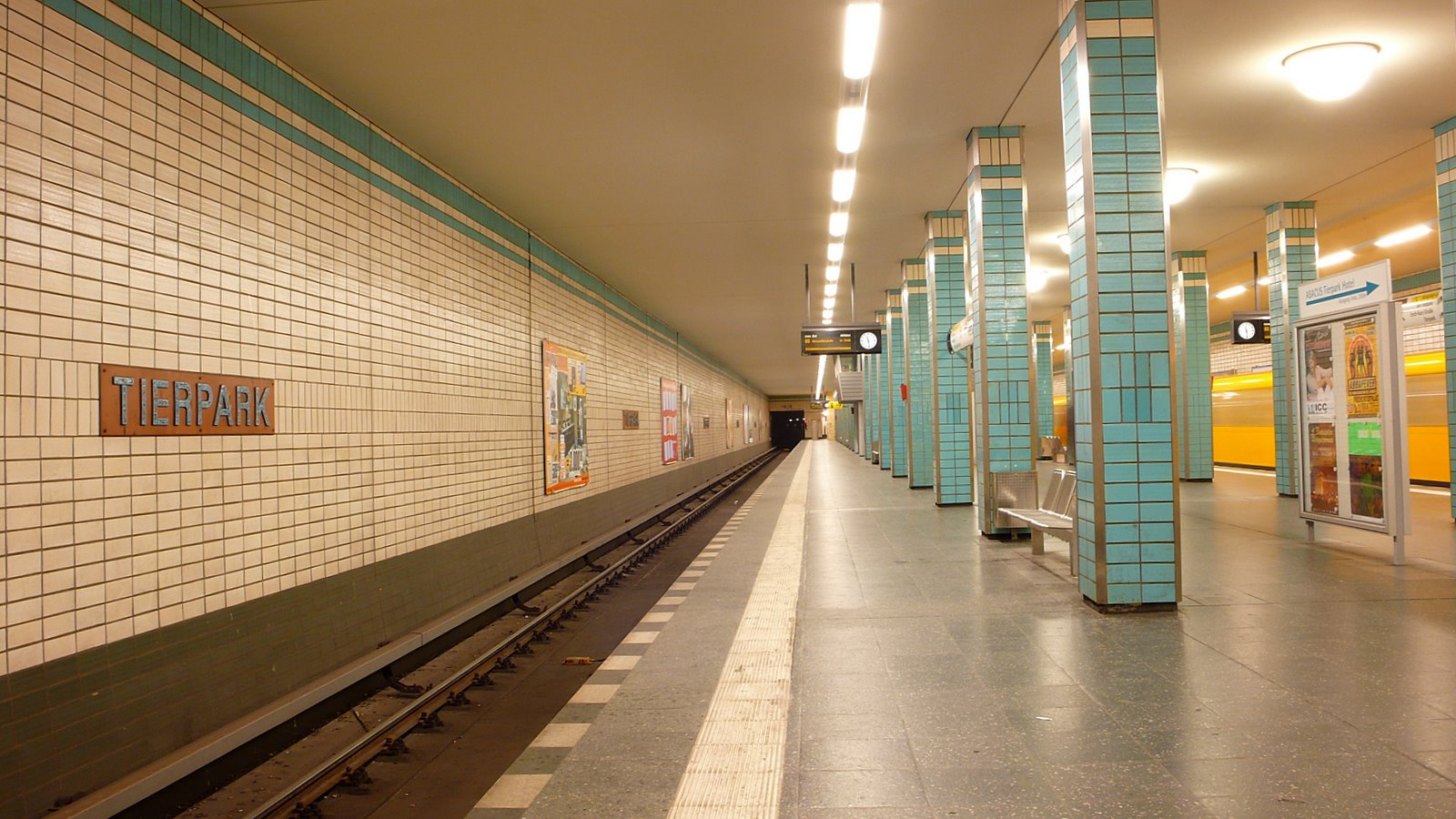
- The stations platforms in 2007.

General information
- Line: U5
- Platforms: 1 island platform
- Tracks: 2

Construction
- Structure type: Underground

History
- Opened: 1973

Services
Preceding station	Berlin U-Bahn	Following station
Friedrichsfelde towards Berlin Hbf	U5	Biesdorf-Süd towards Hönow

Tierpark is a Berlin U-Bahn station located on the U5. It is named after the Tierpark Berlin, one of the two zoological gardens in Berlin.

== History ==
Prior to the opening of the station, the line was intended to go to Karlshorst in the early 1950s/60s plans. Construction of the station began on 19 September 1969. It was mainly constructed to link to the new tram line along Rhinstraße.

This station was opened in 1973. It was the one and only subterranean U-Bahn station to be built by the East German government. Producers were the VEB Kombinat Tiefbau Berlin.

The new plan was to extend the route beyond the Tierpark extension to Oberschöneweide, very near to Treptow. In the 1980s, a new plan was developed to run along the VnK Railway to Kaulsdorf, and to create a new stretch as far as Hönow, removing the need to go to Oberschöneweide and Marzahn.

Design of the route took place in 1983/84. The route length was designated at 10.1 km (6.3 mi), with nine new stations. The new route was supposed to be opened in two phases, ending in 1988, to replace the terminus of the former Line E. Construction began on 1 March 1985, with the first to open being Biesdorf-Süd and Elsterwerdaer Platz, and then on to Hönow by 1 July 1989, just a few months before the fall of the Berlin Wall. The line was renumbered to U5 after the Wall fell, on 1 July 1990.
