= Friedrichsfelde station =

Station of the Berlin U-Bahn

Coordinates: 52°30′22″N 13°30′46″E

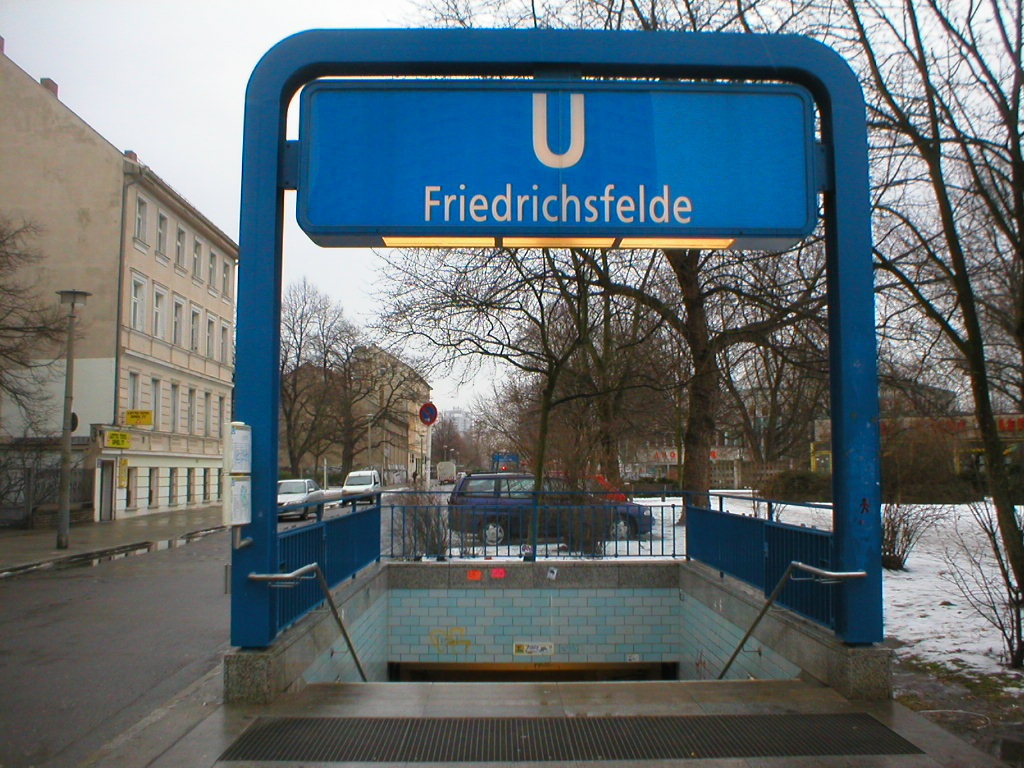
Entrance on Einbecker Straße

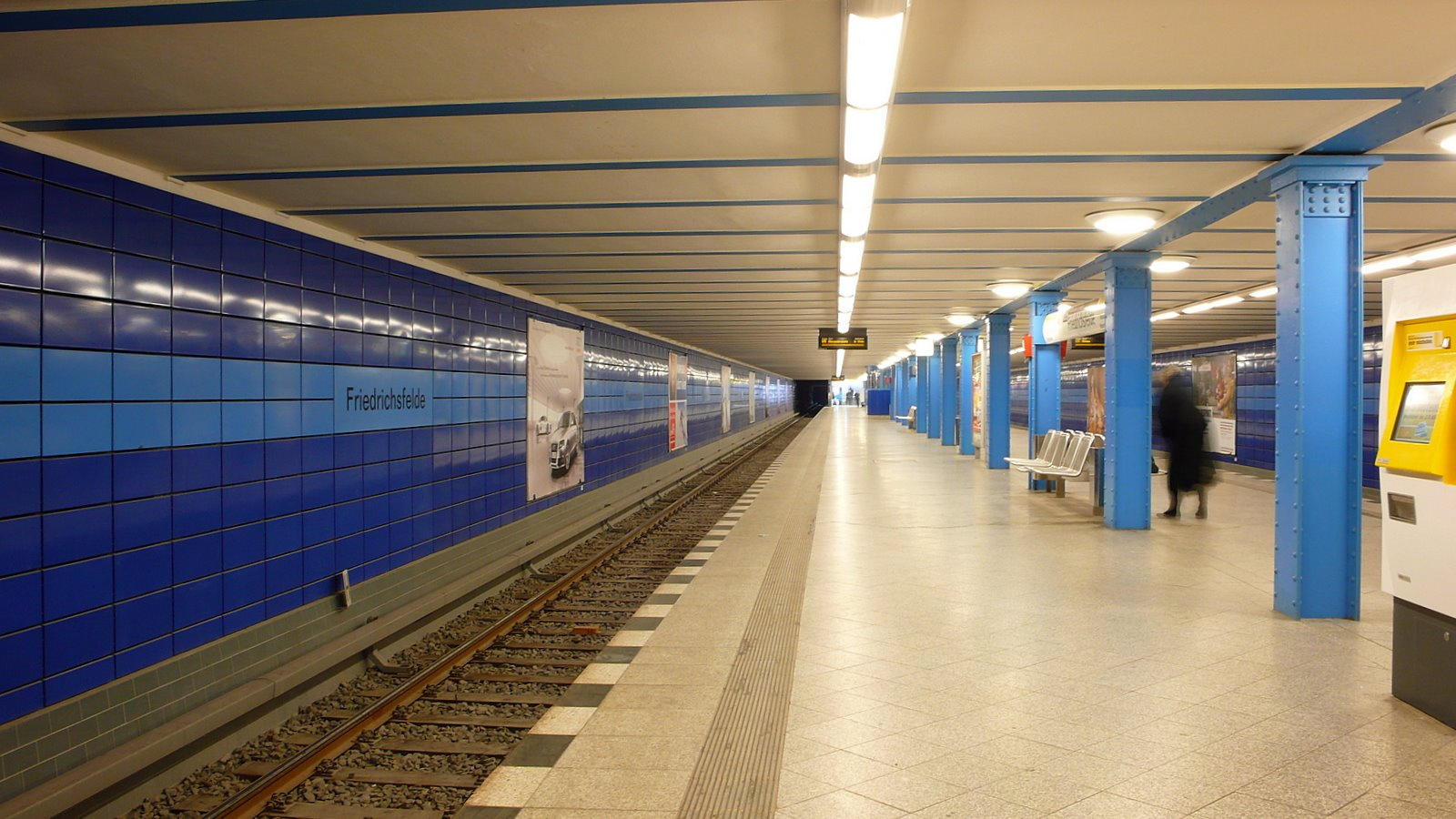
Platform view

Friedrichsfelde is a Berlin U-Bahn station located on the U5 in the Friedrichsfelde district.

== History ==
It opened on 21 December 1930 as the terminus of Berlin's new eastern U-Bahn line from Alexanderplatz, then called Line E. Alfred Grenander designed its stations in a uniform style. Friedrichsfelde is distinguished by its blue colours - formerly wall tiles, since a 2004 restoration enamel panels.

On 26 February 1945, it was destroyed in World War II.

After the opening of the Tierpark Friedrichsfelde in 1955, Tierpark (zoo) was added to the name of the station, although passengers had to walk about 1.2 km (0.75 mi) to reach the entrance. The line was not extended until 25 June 1973, when Tierpark station opened as the new eastern terminus with direct access to the zoo.

Preceding station	Berlin U-Bahn	Following station
Lichtenberg towards Berlin Hbf	U5	Tierpark towards Hönow
