= Elsterwerdaer Platz station =

Station of the Berlin U-Bahn

Coordinates: 52°30′20″N 13°33′38″E

Elsterwerdaer Platz
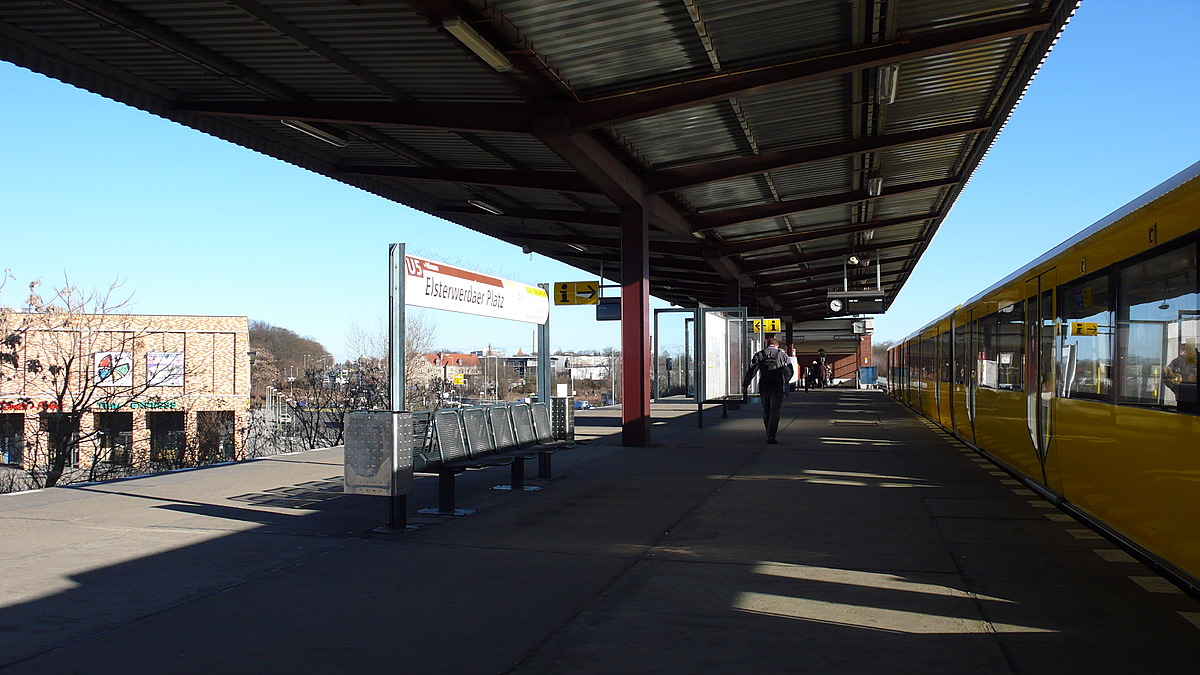

General information
- Line: U5
- Platforms: 1 island platform
- Tracks: 2

Construction
- Structure type: Surface Level

History
- Opened: 1 July 1988

Services
Preceding station	Berlin U-Bahn	Following station
Biesdorf-Süd towards Berlin Hbf	U5	Wuhletal towards Hönow

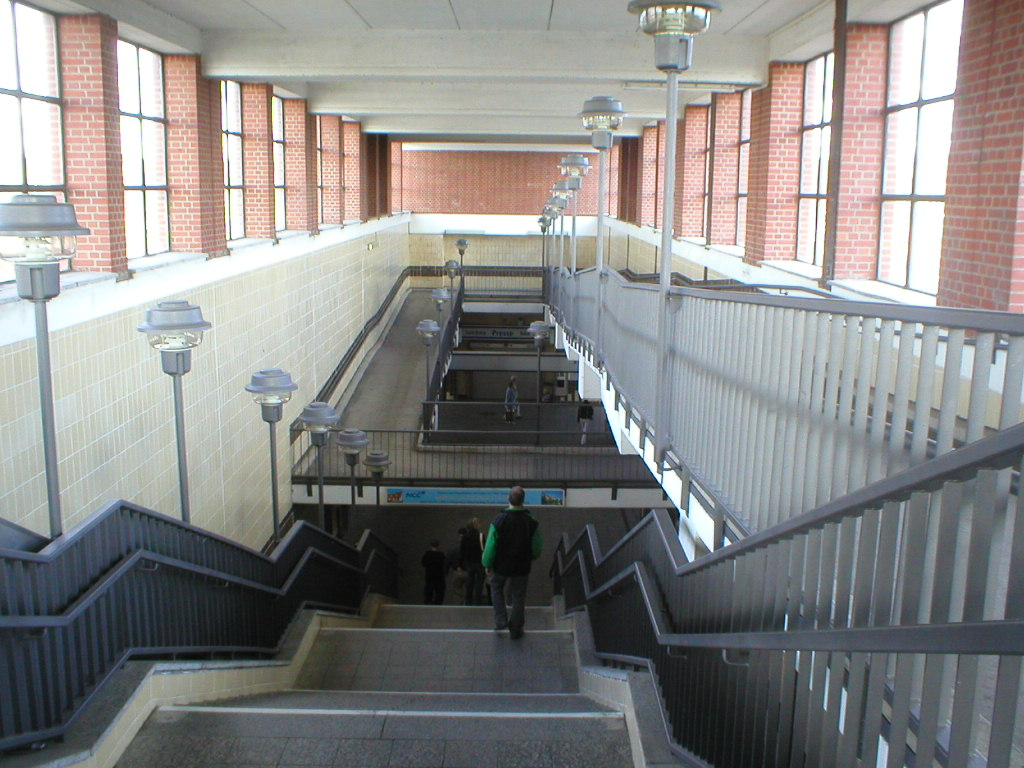
Elsterwerdaer Platz U-Bahn station

Elsterwerdaer Platz is a surface level Berlin U-Bahn station located on the U5. It is named after the town of Elsterwerda. The station opened on 1 July, 1988 to serve the new development of Biesdorf and is near the village commons and the Biesdorf Center shopping mall (on B1). Until 1989, it was the eastern terminus of what is now line U5.
