= New Berlin horse-drawn tramway =

Company based in Berlin

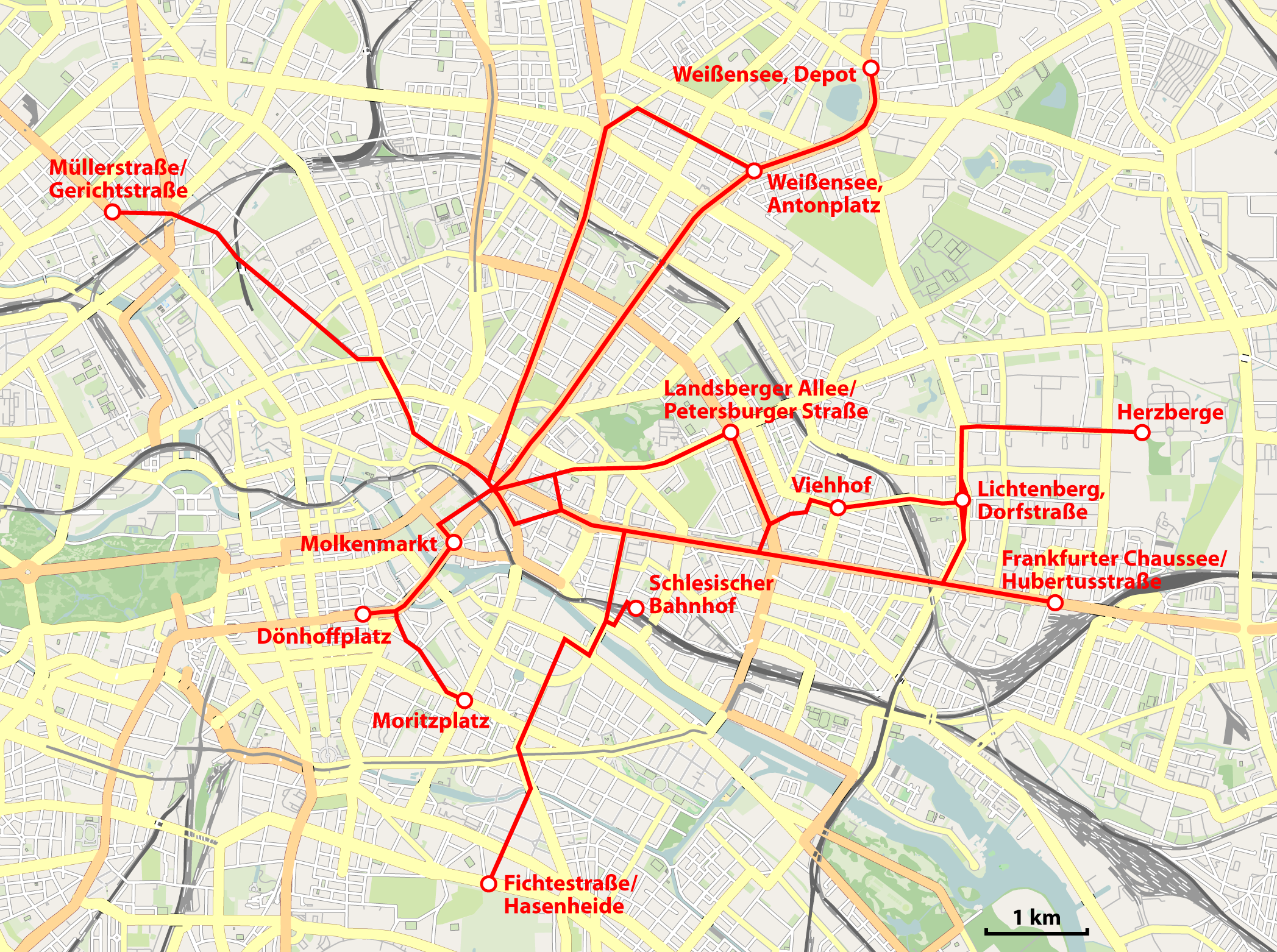
Route network of the New Berlin Horse Tramway in 1895 projected onto the road network of 2010

The New Berlin Horse Tram Company, abbreviated as NBPfG or NBPf, was a horse tram company based in Berlin. From 1877, it operated several lines from Alexanderplatz to Weißensee and Lichtenberg. During its first two years of operation, the company attempted to introduce a so-called perambulator service, a hybrid between a tram and an omnibus. In 1894, operations were taken over by the Große Berliner Pferdeeisenbahn (GBPfE). The NBPfG was removed from the commercial register in 1900.

== History ==
=== Previous history ===
At the end of the 18th century, several colonies emerged between Berlin and Lichtenberg along Frankfurter Allee. These included Boxhagen on what is now Boxhagener Straße, Friedrichsberg near today's Frankfurter Allee station, Lichtenberg-Kietz along Lückstraße, Rummelsburg on Lake Rummelsburg, and Neue Welt and Klein-Frankfurt near today's Frankfurter Tor. From 1870 onwards, the first tenement buildings were erected in this area and Lichtenberg. At the same time, the Hamburg entrepreneur Gustav Adolf Schön acquired the Weißensee manor. He sold approximately 38 hectares to Ernst Wilhelm Johannes Gäbler, who promoted the construction of tenement buildings.

The first transport link for both areas was the Ringbahn, which began operating in 1871. However, Friedrichsberg station (now Frankfurter Allee) did not adequately cover the area, and Weißensee station (now Greifswalder Straße) was located outside the Weißensee municipal area in then-undeveloped land. To connect the area to Berlin, the transport company Weigel established a horse-drawn omnibus line from Alexanderplatz to Weißensee on November 1, 1873.

=== Beginnings with perambulator operation ===
Route Overview as of 18 July 1878
Line/ Signal Sign	Route	Car Sequence	Length (in km)
White	Alexanderplatz – Greifswalder Straße – Bf Weißensee – Antonplatz – Weißensee, Castle	24	5.0
Green	Alexanderplatz – Große Frankfurter Straße – Frankfurter Tor	8	2.0

Shortly after the horse-drawn omnibus line began operating, the growing population in both communities made the construction of more efficient horse-drawn railways appear profitable. Gäbler, as the initiator of the horse-drawn railway, received concessions from the Ministerial Building Commission on July 7 and October 30, 1875, for two lines from Alexanderplatz to Weißensee and Friedrichsberg, respectively. Since both the railway and the land in Weißensee were his property, Gäbler hoped this would facilitate renting out his apartments. The police license for the Weißensee line was granted on December 22, 1875, and on August 5, 1876, the Neue Berliner Pferdebahn-Gesellschaft (New Berlin Horse Tram Company) was founded to finance both lines. On October 25, 1876, Gäbler's heirs, following his death that year, transferred their rights to the company. The construction start date for the Weißensee line is unclear; the route was approved on December 29, 1876. The official opening occurred on January 1, 1877, with a trip to Weißensee Castle.

The perambulator operation (derived from Latin per meaning 'with' and ambulare = 'to travel'; roughly meaning deflection operation) on the line attracted significant attention, as it aimed to combine the advantages of rail (smooth running) and road (flexibility). A track was laid between the Königstor and Weißensee, with vehicles travelling on the road between Alexanderplatz and Königstor. The six cars used had a guide wheel mounted at the front left, lowered onto the rails to keep the car on track, while the other wheels remained on the road. Raising the guide wheel allowed the cars to leave the track, eliminating the need for sidings. The NBPf likely chose this system because constructing tracks in the city centre and sidings along the route was costly.

However, the “fifth wheel” operation proved unsatisfactory. The guide wheel frequently derailed, and the rear axle wobbled, causing uneven running even on rails. Consequently, in 1877, the NBPf converted the line to conventional horse-drawn tram operation, laying tracks to Alexanderplatz and adding passing loops along the route. The deflection cars were converted and later reused as horse-drawn tram cars.

=== Network expansion ===
Line Overview – October 24, 1883
Line/ Signal Board	Route	Car Sequence	Length (in km)
White	Alexanderplatz – Greifswalder Straße – Weißensee Station – Antonplatz – Castle Weißensee – Weißensee Depot	12	5.7
Green	Molkenmarkt – Alexanderplatz – Große Frankfurter Straße – Frankfurter Tor – Friedrichsberg Station	10	5.5
Red/White	Molkenmarkt – Alexanderplatz – Große Frankfurter Straße – Frankfurter Tor – Baltenplatz – Cattle and Slaughterhouse	10	4.6
Yellow/Red Stripe	Town Hall, Königstraße – Alexanderplatz – Landsberger Straße – Landsberger Allee Station – Petersburger Straße – Baltenplatz – Cattle and Slaughterhouse	24	4.9
White/Green	Town Hall, Königstraße – Alexanderplatz – Landsberger Straße – Landsberger Allee Station – Landsberger Allee corner Petersburger Straße	8	3.2

The second section of the NBPf, a horse-drawn tramway from Alexanderplatz to Frankfurter Tor, likely opened on July 18, 1878. Since the two lines were not initially connected by tracks, a separate depot was built on Kleine Frankfurter Straße. On June 1, 1879, the line was extended to the intersection of Frankfurter Allee and Proskauer Straße. At that time, negotiations were underway between the NBPf and the city of Berlin to establish a line toward Wedding, but this was not realised for several years.

On May 31, 1881, the city and the company signed an agreement approving the construction of two lines to the new central livestock and slaughterhouse northwest of Lichtenberg. The city also guaranteed NBPf operation on existing and newly constructed lines until December 31, 1909. One new line branched off from the Friedrichsberg line at Thaerstraße, running via Baltenplatz to the terminus at Forckenbeckplatz. The second route ran from Alexanderplatz via Landsberger Straße and Landsberger Allee to Petersburger Straße, then via Baltenplatz to Viehhof am Forckenbeckplatz. The southern access road via Thaerstraße and the first section of the northern route from Alexanderplatz to Landsberger Tor opened on December 15, 1881. The extension to the intersection of Landsberger Allee and Petersburger Straße followed on June 8, 1882, and the section along Petersburger Straße was completed between July 1, 1882, and March 31, 1883. The company then operated four lines. On October 24, 1883, with the opening of the first GBPfE line and a track connection between the two networks, these lines were extended further into the city centre, terminating at various points. As a result, the NBPf became Berlin's second-largest tram operator, ahead of the Berlin Horse Tramway, though its share of total traffic never exceeded seven per cent.

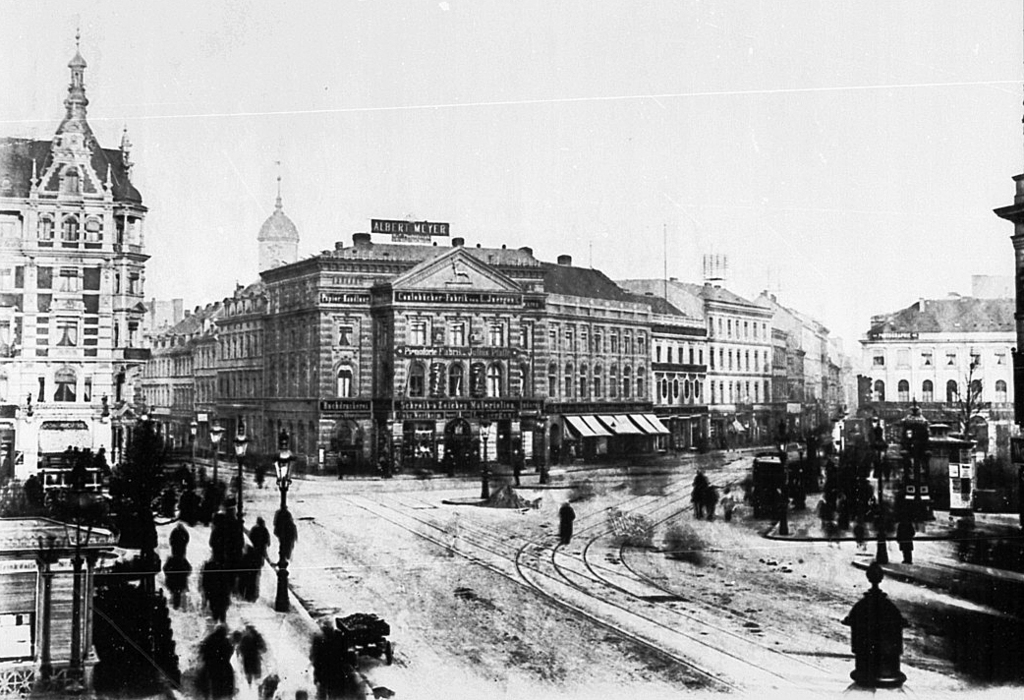
View from Alexanderplatz onto Neue Königstraße (left) and Landsberger Straße (right), around 1880

On August 15, 1885, a supplementary agreement, based on the 1881 agreement, allowed the NBPf to build two lines: one from Alexanderplatz to the intersection of Müllerstraße and Gerichtstraße, and another from Frankfurter Allee through Boxhagener Straße to Rummelsburg, partly using GBPfE tracks. The latest construction start date was set for October 1, 1887. However, the NBPf did not proceed with the Rummelsburg line, and the Wedding line faced delays. The first 2.3-kilometer section from Alexanderplatz via Münzstraße, Rosenthaler Straße, Brunnenstraße, Invalidenstraße, and Ackerstraße to Gartenstraße opened on October 16, 1888. Between Rosenthaler Platz and the corner of Invalidenstraße and Ackerstraße, the railway used GBPfE tracks. In the same year, an extension of the Weißensee line from Große Seestraße via Heinersdorfer Straße to the racecourse began operation. This short section was served by a special line between Weißensee station and the racecourse during events, likely continuing until 1895.

In 1890, construction was approved for an extension from the cattle yard through Eldenaer Straße and Scheffelstraße to the centre of Lichtenberg at what is now Loeperplatz. On May 1, 1890, a new line began operating from Moritzplatz via Alexanderplatz and Viehhof to Lichtenberger Dorfstraße.

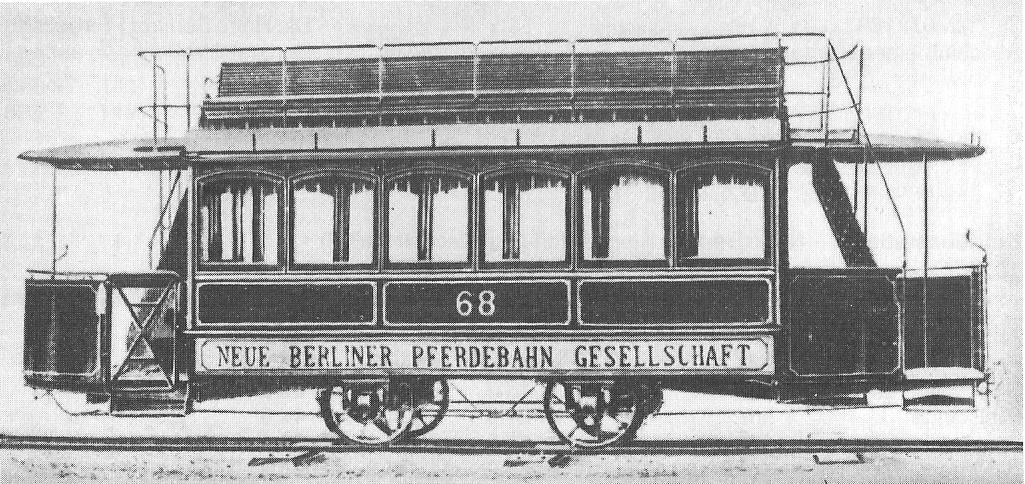
Deck carriage 68, built in 1882

The next major expansion, approved on April 7, 1892, involved three lines: from Schönhauser Tor via Weißenburger Straße to Danziger Straße, from Alexanderplatz via Prenzlauer Allee to Antonplatz in Weißensee, and from Friedrichsberg station through Lichtenberger Dorfstraße to the Herzberge mental hospital. The NBPf was released from its obligation to build the Rummelsburg line, as it doubted its economic viability.

With effect from November 14, 1892, the Neue Berliner Pferdebahn came under the Prussian Light Rail Act of July 28, 1892. The Prussian Trade Regulations no longer applied, and new concessions were required from the Prussian police headquarters. Initially, the company refrained from building further lines, as network electrification was planned, necessitating new concessions. The last new lines built were the connection to Herzberge and the extension through Frankfurter Allee to the border of Friedrichsfelde at Hubertusstraße. By the end of 1893, the NBPf operated nine lines.

=== Takeover by the Great Berlin Horse Railway ===
Line Overview – 1 December 1895
Line/ Signal Board	Route	Car Sequence	Length (in km)
White	Molkenmarkt – Alexanderplatz – Greifswalder Straße – Weißensee Station – Antonplatz – Castle Weißensee – Weißensee, Depot	6	6.5
Green/Red	Dönhoffplatz – Spittelmarkt – Molkenmarkt – Alexanderplatz – Große Frankfurter Straße – Frankfurter Tor – Frankfurter Allee Station – Frankfurter Chaussee, corner Hubertusstraße	10	7.8
Red/White	Dönhoffplatz – Spittelmarkt – Molkenmarkt – Alexanderplatz – Große Frankfurter Straße – Frankfurter Tor – Baltenplatz – Cattle and Slaughterhouse – Lichtenberg, Dorfstraße	10	7.4
Yellow	Moritzplatz – Spittelmarkt – Molkenmarkt – Alexanderplatz – Landsberger Straße – Landsberger Allee Station – Petersburger Straße – Baltenplatz – Cattle and Slaughterhouse	40	7.2
White/Green	Moritzplatz – Spittelmarkt – Molkenmarkt – Alexanderplatz – Landsberger Straße – Landsberger Allee Station – Landsberger Allee, corner Petersburger Straße	5	5.5
Yellow/Red Stripe	Müllerstraße, corner Gerichtstraße – Gartenplatz – Ackerstraße – Rosenthaler Platz – Alexanderplatz – Große Frankfurter Straße – Andreasstraße – Schlesischer Station	8	7.0
Yellow	Gartenplatz – Ackerstraße – Rosenthaler Platz – Alexanderplatz – Große Frankfurter Straße – Andreasstraße – Schillingbrücke – Köpenicker Straße – Fichtestraße, corner Hasenheide	8	8.4
White/Blue Stripe	Molkenmarkt – Alexanderplatz – Prenzlauer Allee – Prenzlauer Allee Station – Langhansstraße – Weißensee, Antonplatz	12	6.0
White	Frankfurter Allee Station – Lichtenberg, Dorfstraße – Herzbergstraße – Herzberge (Queen Elisabeth Hospital)	30	3.2

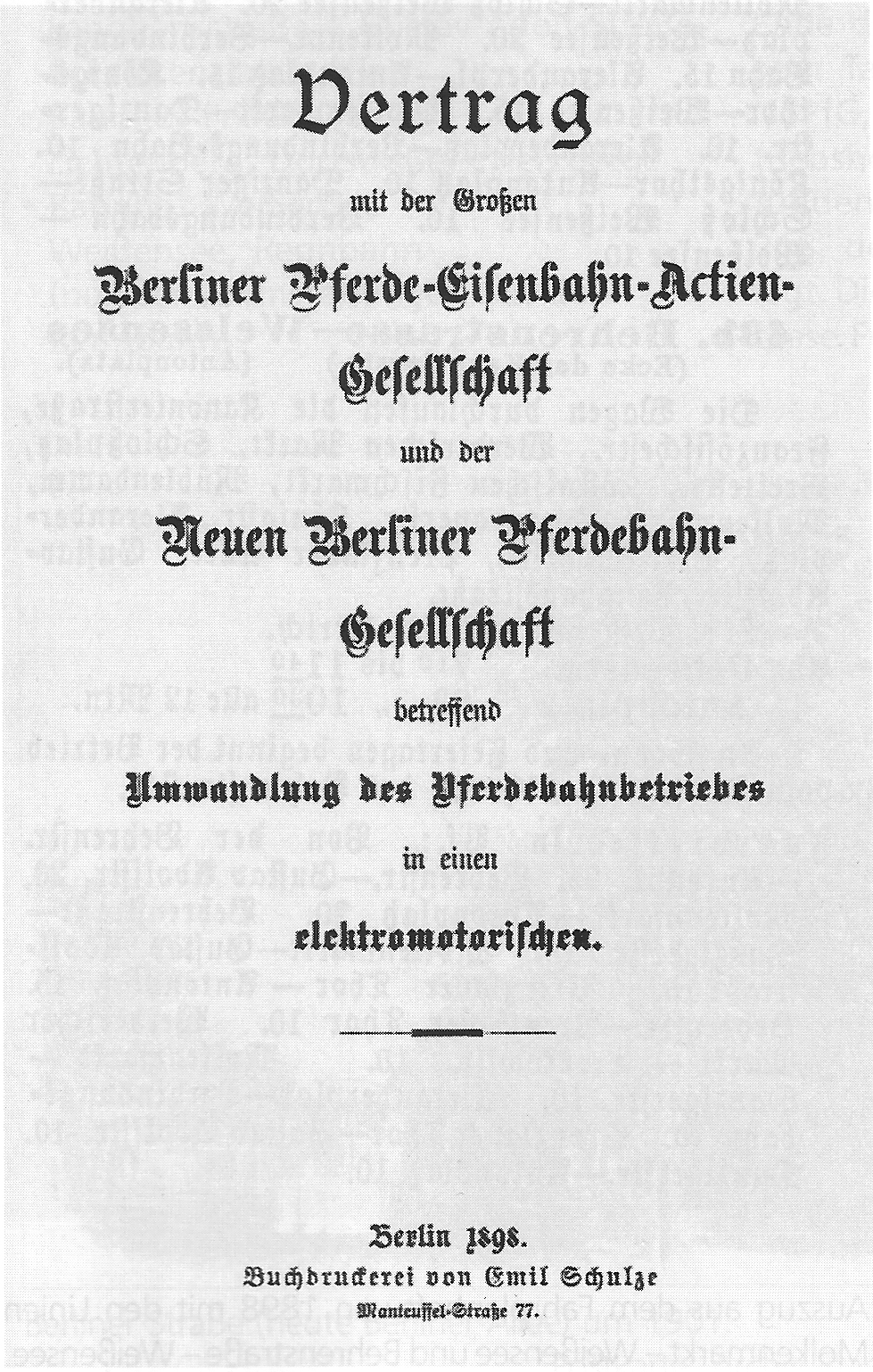
Cover page of the electrification agreement between GBPfE and NBPf

Starting in the 1890s, the Große Berliner Pferdeeisenbahn (Great Berlin Horse Railway) began acquiring nearby tram businesses. The NBPf, Berlin's third-largest tram company, was the first major acquisition. After the GBPfE acquired a majority stake, it moved the NBPf's administration from the depot at Kleine Frankfurter Straße 1 to the GBPfE headquarters at Friedrichstraße 218 on February 1, 1894. Management was taken over by GBPfE directors.

During this period, the NBPf launched three additional lines. On October 22, 1894, service began from Schönhauser Tor through Weißenburger Straße to the intersection of Prenzlauer Allee and Danziger Straße, used exclusively by the GBPfE, initially on the line Hermannplatz–Alexanderplatz–Schönhauser Tor–Danziger Straße corner Prenzlauer Allee. On December 22, 1894, the extension from Gartenplatz to the intersection of Müllerstraße and Gerichtstraße, approved in 1892, followed. The final section, also approved in 1892, ran along Prenzlauer Allee to Antonplatz and was completed on December 1, 1895.

On September 10, 1895, Siemens & Halske launched Berlin's first electric tram line. The GBPfE, initially sceptical of the new system due to high investment costs, faced pressure to electrify. With the city approval agreement expiring in 1911, investments were necessary. This led to the “Electrification Agreement” between the City of Berlin, GBPfE, and NBPf, signed on July 2, 1897, and January 19, 1898. The agreement mandated electrification of both networks by the end of 1902, the merger of the two companies, approved additional lines, and extended operations until December 31, 1919.

On January 25, 1898, the Große Berliner Pferdeeisenbahn became the Große Berliner Straßenbahn (GBS). On January 1, 1900, it officially took over the Neue Berliner Pferdebahn-Gesellschaft, which was removed from the commercial register on March 13, 1900. The rolling stock, including horses, was initially reused by the GBS. Between January 24, 1900, and November 3, 1901, the former NBPf lines were electrified, except for Landsberger Straße from Büschingplatz and Landsberger Allee, served by the Berlin–Hohenschönhausen tram of the Continentalen Gesellschaft für elektrische Unternehmungen since October 21, 1899. In 1902, lines were assigned numbers instead of signal boards.

Despite its size, the Neue Berliner Pferdebahn was less successful than the GBPfE. High initial fares deterred the working-class population of Lichtenberg and Weißensee, leading to expenditure exceeding income in the first decade. Only after extending lines into the city centre did the income and expenditure balance. During the transition to the GBS, the company paid a substantial dividend. With the exception of the Wedding route and the tram line along what is now Karl-Marx-Allee and Frankfurter Allee, all former NBPf routes remain in operation, some with modified routes.

== Operation ==
=== Operational statistics ===
Operational statistics
Year (Note: Until 1883, NBPf's fiscal year ran from July 1 to June 30, after which it was aligned with the calendar year.)	Cars	Horses	Route Length (in km) (Note: After 1895, NBPf did not open any new lines; figures for subsequent years are based on statistical yearbooks.)	Track Length (in km)	Line Length (in km)	Passengers (in millions)	Car km (in millions)	Passengers/ Car-km
1877/78	6	n/a	5.5	n/a	5.5	0.42	0.27	1.56
1879/80	39	87	8.6	10.1	8.6	2.12	0.50	4.33
1882/83	73	203	18.4	22.9	21.2	4.14	1.73	2.40
1886	94	334	n/a	24.7	22.8	6.95	1.72	4.04
1889	127	589	n/a	n/a	32.0	13.25	3.68	3.60
1891	127	665	19.7	34.4	32.6	14.10	3.95	3.57
1893	139	652	25.6	40.1	39.9	15.60	5.13	3.04
1895	160	792	31.5	48.6	53.7	18.31	4.94	3.70
1896	182	886	31.5	47.2	56.9	21.78	5.59	3.89
1897	177	939	34.1	52.9	57.0	22.73	5.57	4.08
1899	158	760	38.1	72.6	57.5	27.64	6.57	4.20

=== Timetable and fares ===
The NBPf lines operated from approximately 6:00 a.m. to midnight, with consistent car intervals, which increased during evening hours. As the network expanded, some routes had overlapping lines. Travel speed was around 9–9.5 km/h, increasing after electrification.

The NBPf initially charged a partial fare of five pfennigs per kilometre, with single trips costing 10–25 pfennigs. Children under six travelled free, and two children over six were charged one adult fare. Tenants in Gäbler’s apartments were intended to receive a fare reduction, though no evidence confirms implementation.

In the summer of 1879, the NBPf attempted to abolish the partial fare on Sunday afternoons and public holidays to improve its economic situation. However, as the GBPfE maintained the partial fare and paid dividends up to 7.5 percent annually, the police headquarters and magistrate rejected the fare increase.

== Depots ==
=== Weißensee ===
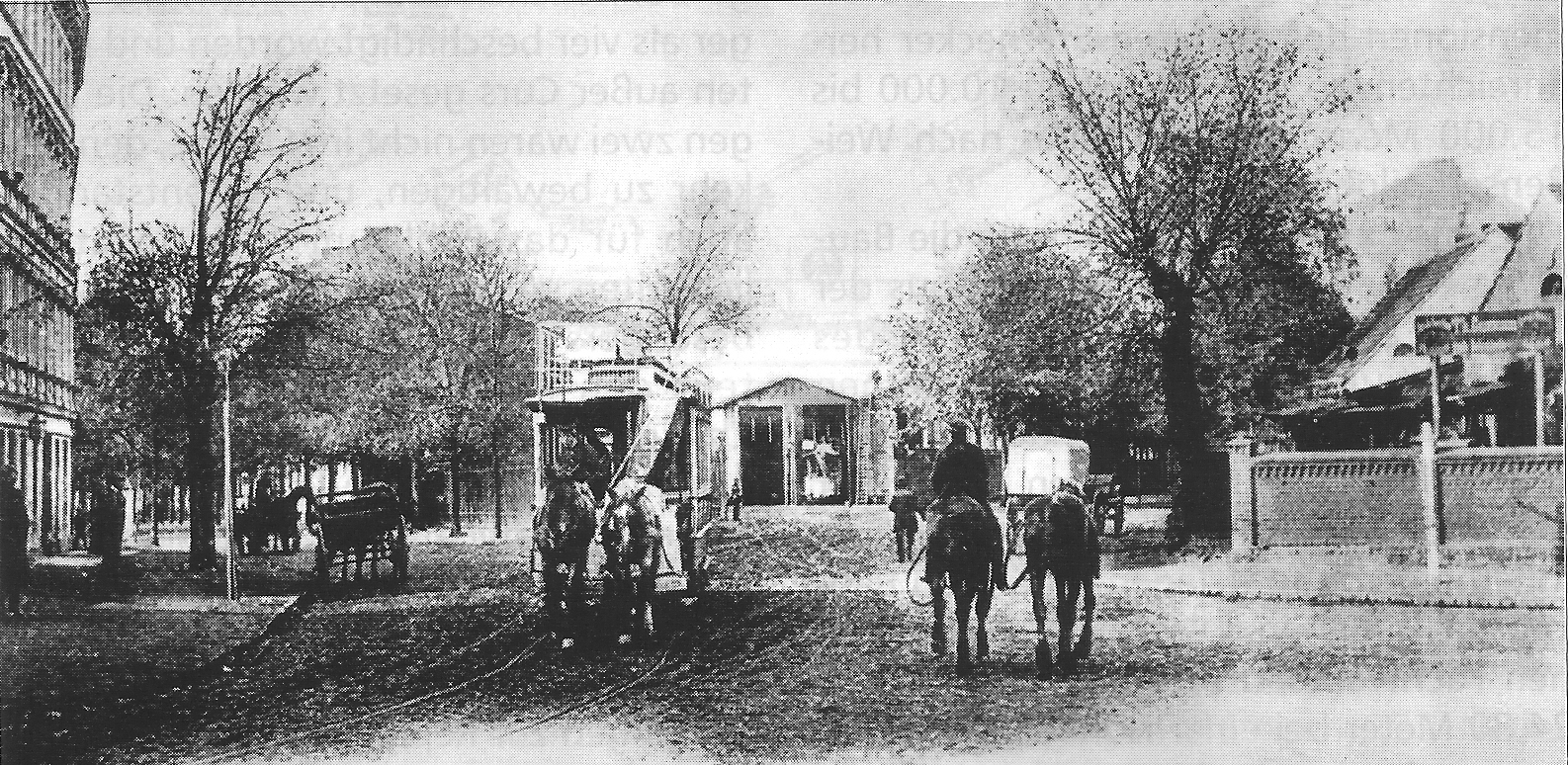
Depot Weißensee during the horse-drawn tram era

The Weißensee depot, located at the corner of Heinersdorfer Straße (now Rennbahnstraße) and Große Seestraße, was built between 1875 and 1877. The half-timbered building, measuring 7.80 × 24.80 meters with a 5-meter height, had a capacity for six cars on two tracks. Initially, it likely lacked a mainline connection.

A report in the Niederbarnimer Kreisblatt on April 8, 1877, suggested a depot near Weißensee Castle for perambulator service, but this likely referred to temporary storage due to insufficient space for maintenance in the main depot. In 1883, the depot expanded by 10 parking spaces, with the hall now covering 14.83 × 34.90 meters across four bays. In 1885, further expansions included a stable for 104 horses, an administration and residential building, a 75-meter hall roof extension, and a 10-meter extension for a workshop, smithy, and shoeing hall.

By November 1886, two additional stables were built, and another was added in March 1897, with the complex covering 10,161 square meters. The GBS used the depot for horse-drawn trams until 1901, when it was converted for electric operation. By 1902, a new carriage shed was built, the administration building was repurposed, and stables were converted into a carriage shed with an inspection pit and a locksmith’s workshop. The depot then covered 10,213 square meters, accommodating 85 cars. After the opening of GBS station 22 (now the Weißensee depot) on Bernkasteller Straße, the old depot was abandoned. Today, residential buildings occupy the site.

=== Little Frankfurt Street ===
The depot for the Friedrichsberg horse-drawn tramway, initially independent of the Weißensee line, was operational at Kleine Frankfurter Straße 1–2 by 1878, possibly as early as summer 1877. Until the GBPfE takeover in 1894, the NBPf administration was located here. In 1894, the depot’s floor space was 4,464 square meters. The GBS converted it for electric operation, accommodating 55 cars as GBS depot 21. After the opening of station 24 (now the Lichtenberg depot) on Siegfriedstraße in 1913, the depot closed. The Kino International cinema now stands on the site.
