= Berlin Landsberger Allee station =

Railway station in Pankow, Germany

Coordinates: 52°31′46″N 13°27′16″E

Landsberger Allee
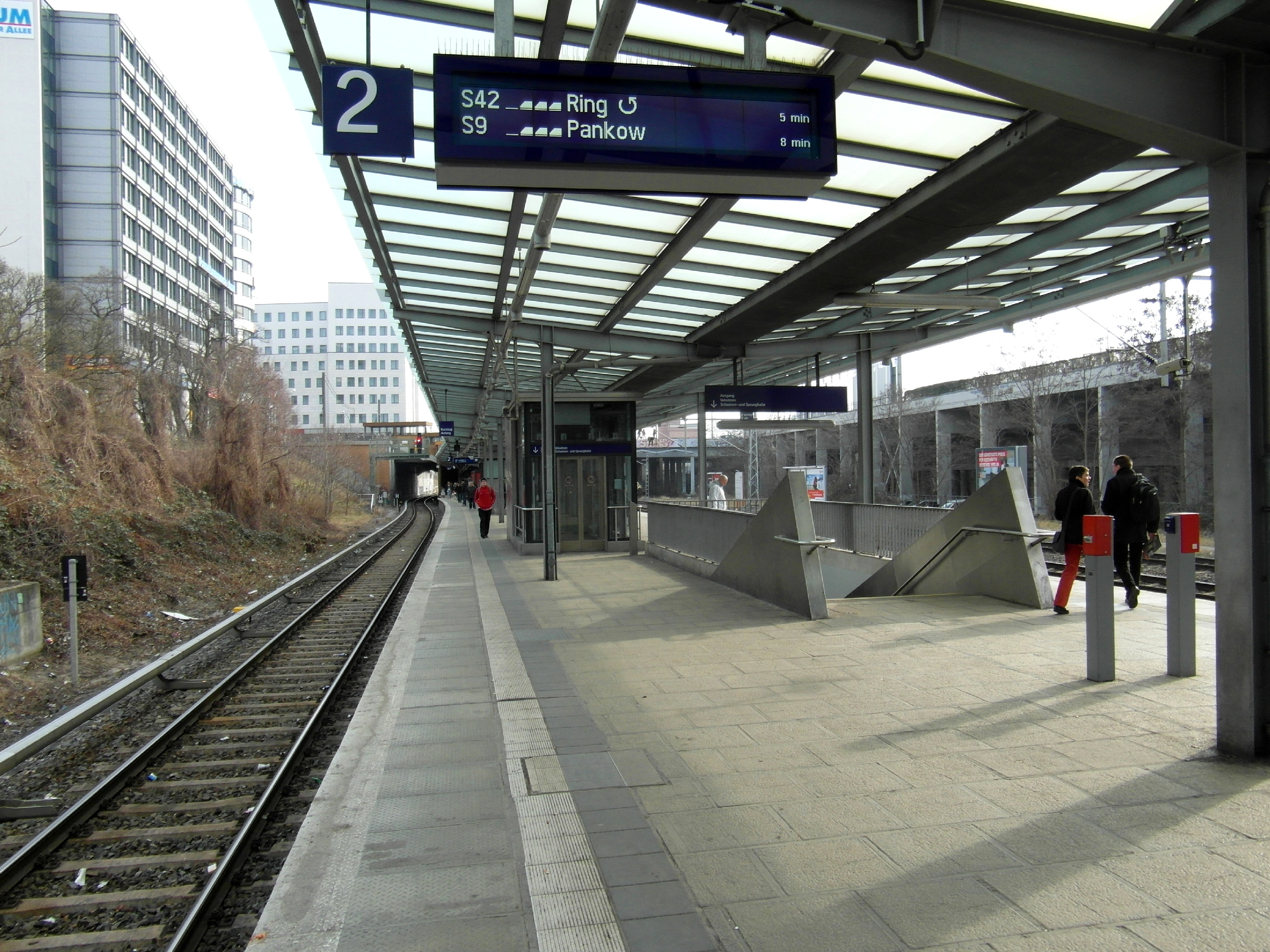

General information
- Owner: Deutsche Bahn
- Operator: DB Netz; DB Station&Service
- Line: Ringbahn
- Platforms: 1 island platform
- Tracks: 2
- Connections: S41 S42 S8 S85

Other information
- Fare zone: VBB: Berlin A/5555
- Website: www.bahnhof.de

Services
Preceding station	Berlin S-Bahn	Following station
Greifswalder Straße One-way operation	S41	Storkower Straße Ringbahn (clockwise)
Greifswalder Straße Ringbahn (counter-clockwise)	S42	Storkower Straße One-way operation
Greifswalder Straße towards Birkenwerder	S8	Storkower Straße towards Wildau
Greifswalder Straße towards Waidmannslust	S85	Storkower Straße towards Grünau
Location

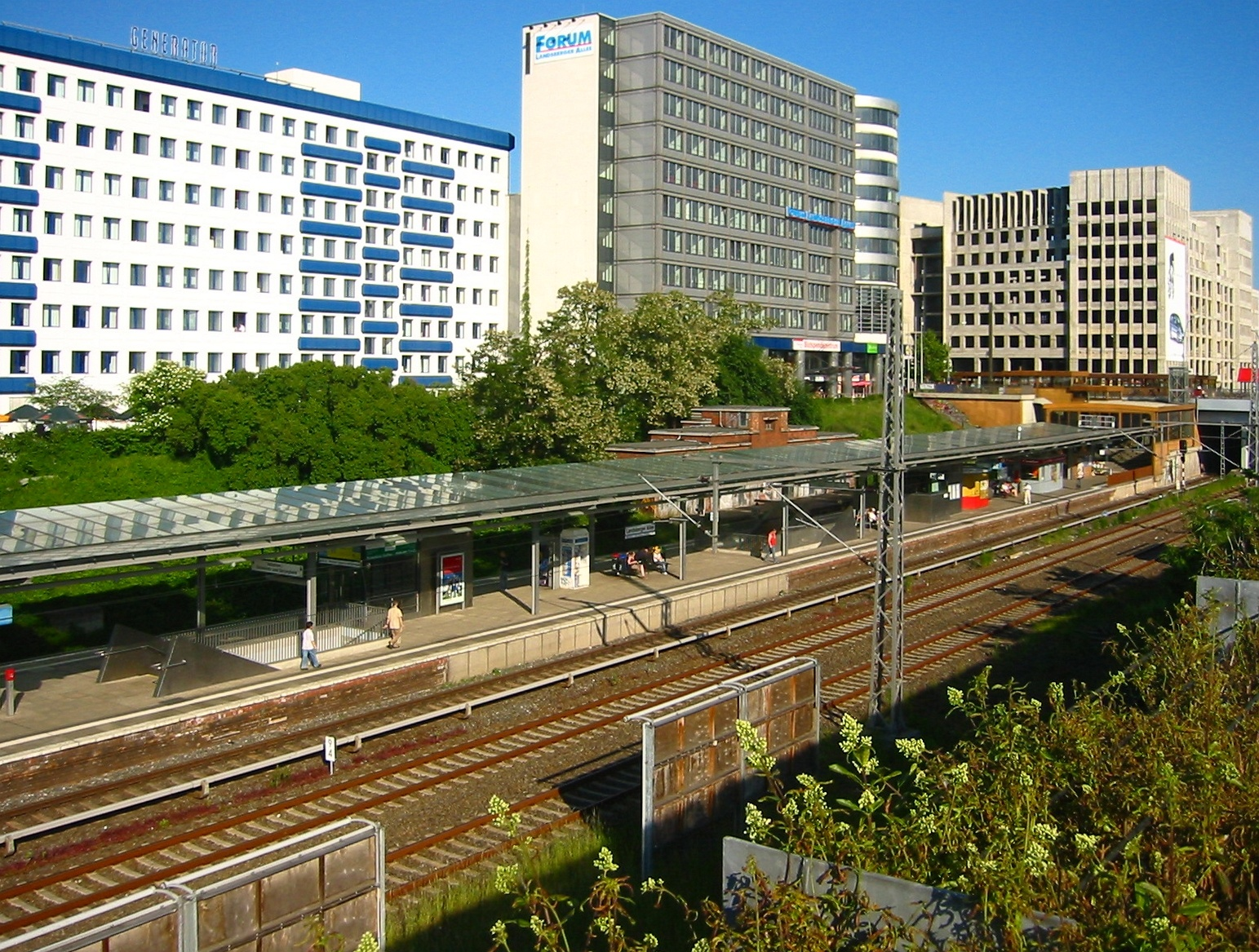
A view of Landsberger Allee station from the west.

Landsberger Allee is a railway station in the Prenzlauer Berg district of Berlin, close to the district's border with Fennpfuhl. It is served by the S-Bahn lines S41, S42, S8 and S85. The station was named Leninallee in 1950 and has changed name several times since.

== Notable places nearby ==
- Schwimm- und Sprunghalle im Europasportpark (SSE)
- Velodrom
