= Berlin Prenzlauer Allee station =

Railway station in Berlin, Germany

Prenzlauer Allee
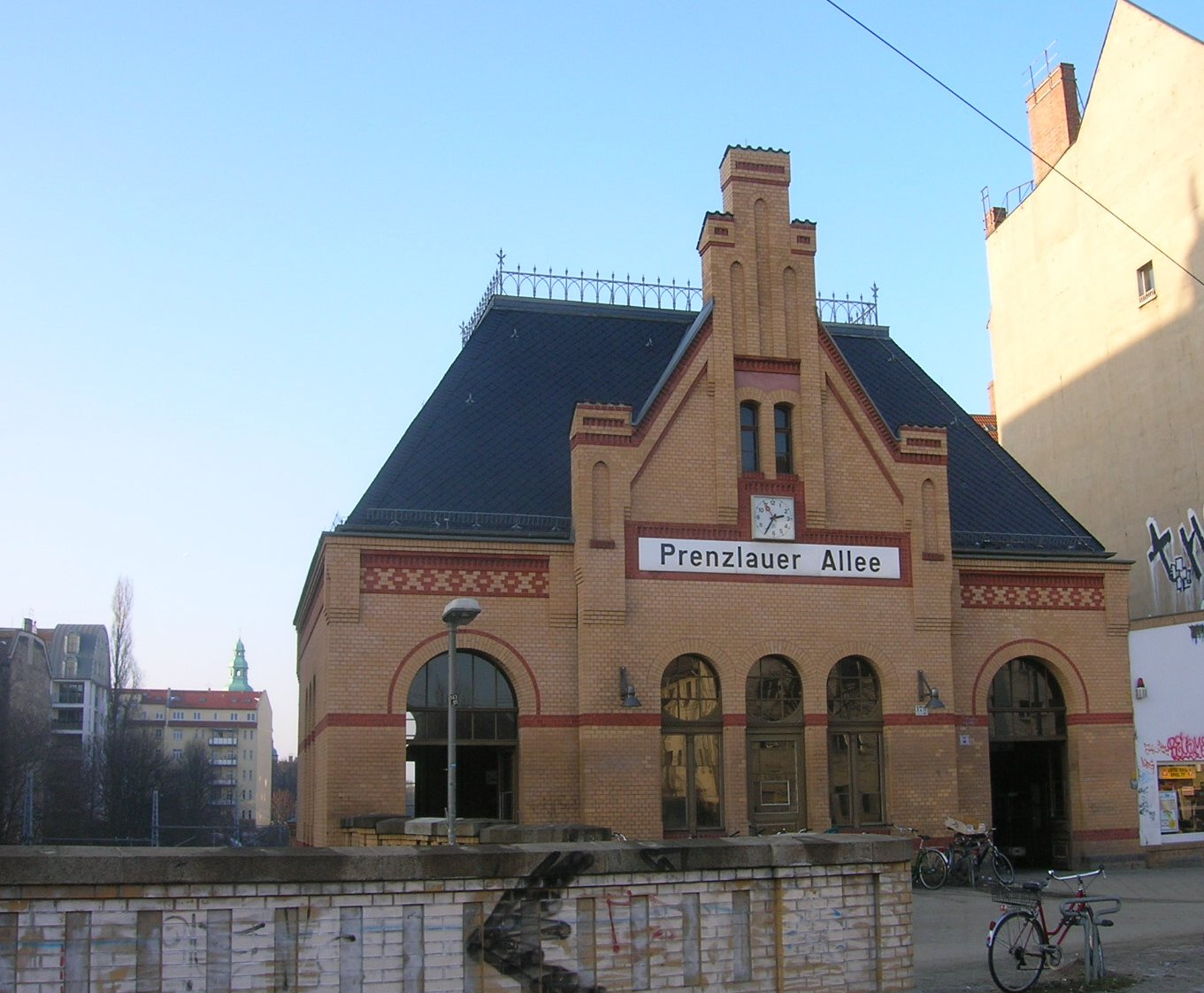

General information
- Location: Pankow, Berlin, Berlin; Germany
- Coordinates: 52°32′38″N 13°25′34″E
- Owner: DB Netz
- Operator: DB Station&Service
- Line: Ringbahn
- Platforms: 1 island platform
- Tracks: 2
- Connections: S41 S42 S8 S85

Other information
- Station code: n/a
- DS100 code: BPLA
- Category: 4
- Fare zone: VBB: Berlin A/5555

History
- Opened: 1 May 1892

Services
Preceding station	Berlin S-Bahn	Following station
Schönhauser Allee One-way operation	S41	Greifswalder Straße Ringbahn (clockwise)
Schönhauser Allee Ringbahn (counter-clockwise)	S42	Greifswalder Straße One-way operation
Schönhauser Allee towards Birkenwerder	S8	Greifswalder Straße towards Wildau
Schönhauser Allee towards Waidmannslust	S85	Greifswalder Straße towards Grünau
Location

Prenzlauer Allee is a railway station in the Prenzlauer Berg neighbourhood of Berlin, named after the Prenzlauer Allee road. Situated on the Berlin Ringbahn, it is served by the S-Bahn lines S41, S42, S8 and S85. The station is barrier-free.

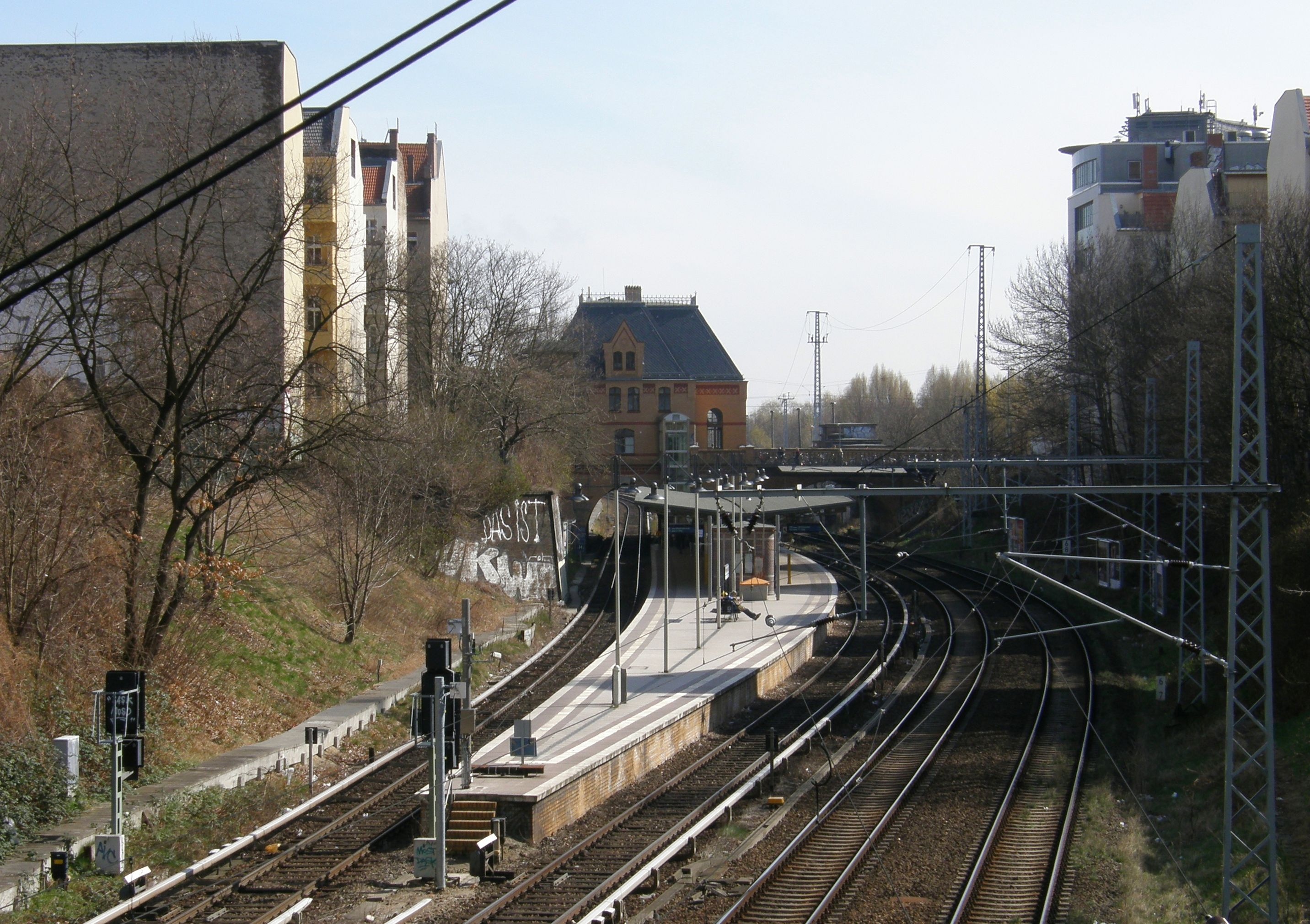
Platforms

== History ==
The station was opened on 1 May 1892 where Prenzlauer Allee crosses the Ringbahn tracks at right angle. It consists of a platform for S-Bahn trains and a clinker brick style reception building, which was damaged in World War II. Unlike other reception buildings of nearby stations, it has been rebuilt in its original condition.

== Other services and connections ==
The station can also be reached via the line of the Berlin tram network and by BVG bus line 156.
