= Berlin Greifswalder Straße station =

Railway station in Berlin, Germany

Greifswalder Straße
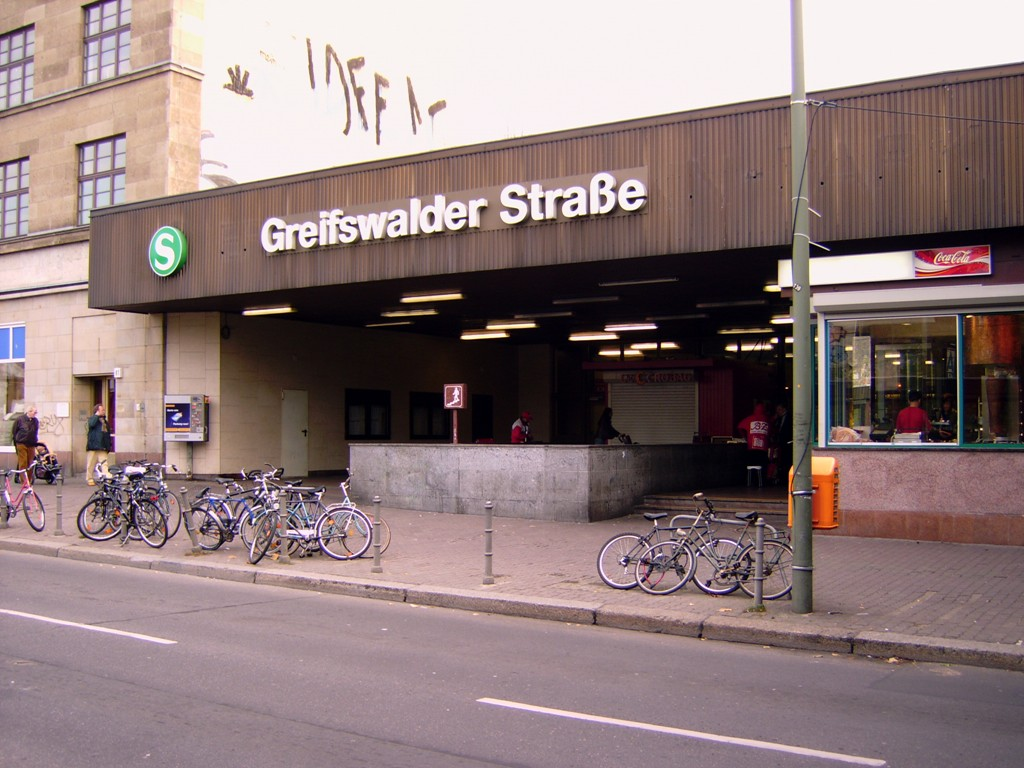

General information
- Location: Pankow, Berlin, Berlin; Germany
- Coordinates: 52°32′23″N 13°26′22″E
- Owner: Deutsche Bahn
- Operator: DB Netz; DB Station&Service
- Line: Ringbahn
- Platforms: 1 island platform
- Tracks: 2
- Connections: S41 S42 S8 S85

Other information
- Station code: n/a
- Category: 4
- Fare zone: VBB: Berlin A/5555

History
- Opened: 1 February 1929

Services
Preceding station	Berlin S-Bahn	Following station
Prenzlauer Allee One-way operation	S41	Landsberger Allee Ringbahn (clockwise)
Prenzlauer Allee Ringbahn (counter-clockwise)	S42	Landsberger Allee One-way operation
Prenzlauer Allee towards Birkenwerder	S8	Landsberger Allee towards Wildau
Prenzlauer Allee towards Waidmannslust	S85	Landsberger Allee towards Grünau
Location

S-Bhf. Greifswalder Straße is a railway station in the Prenzlauer Berg district of Berlin. It is served by the S-Bahn lines S41, S42, S8 and S85.
