= Berlin Storkower Straße station =

Railway station in Berlin, Germany

Storkower Straße
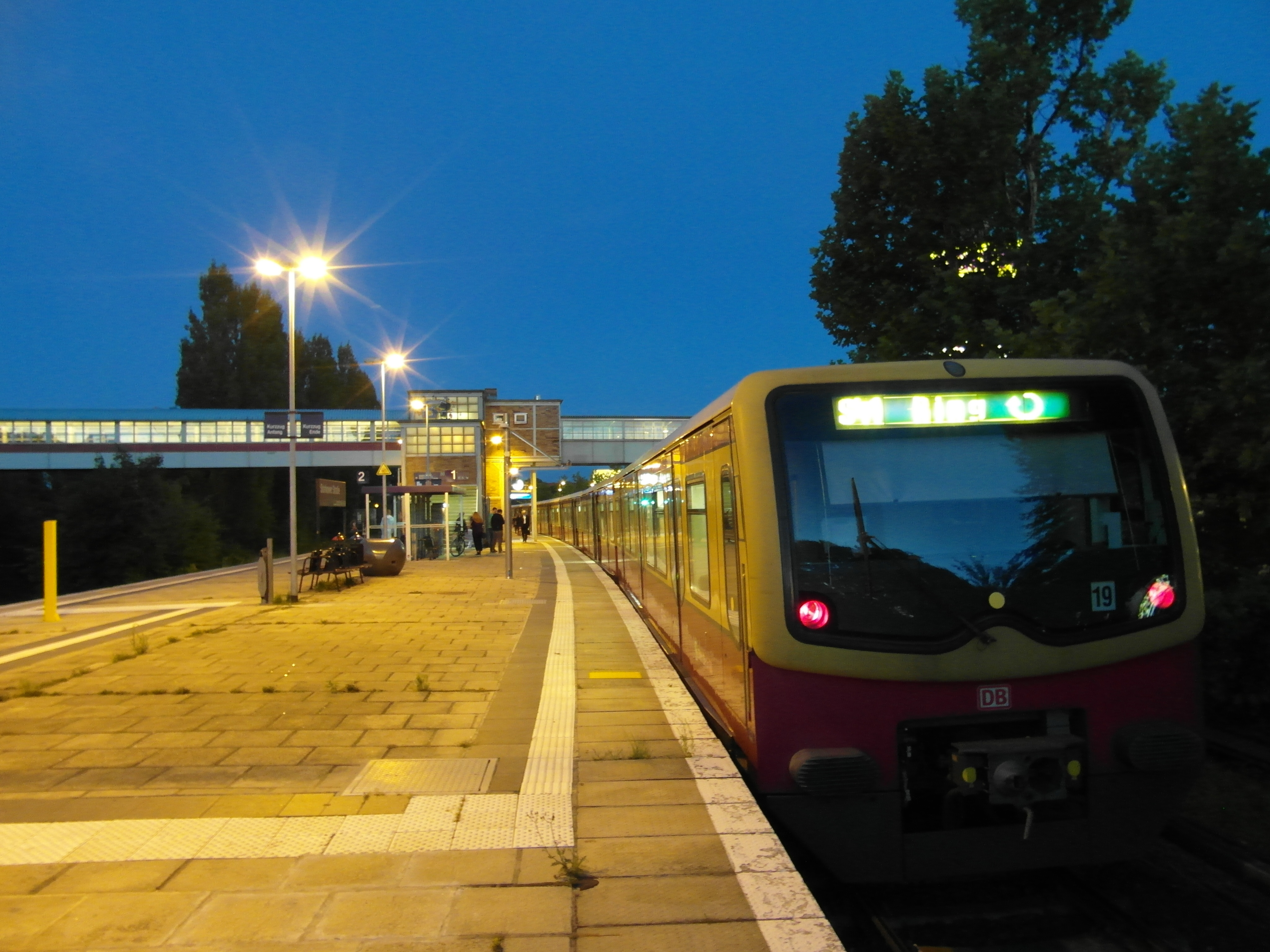
- Platform view

General information
- Location: Storkower Straße, Fennpfuhl; Hermann-Blankenstein-Straße, Prenzlauer Berg; Pankow, Berlin, Berlin; Germany
- Coordinates: 52°31′26″N 13°27′52″E
- Owner: Deutsche Bahn
- Operator: DB InfraGO
- Line: Ringbahn
- Platforms: 1 island platform
- Tracks: 2
- Train operators: S-Bahn Berlin
- Connections: 156 240

Other information
- Station code: 6042
- DS100 code: BSTO
- IBNR: 8089041
- Category: 4
- Fare zone: VBB: Berlin A/5555
- Website: www.bahnhof.de

History
- Opened: 4 May 1881; 145 years ago

Services
Preceding station	Berlin S-Bahn	Following station
Landsberger Allee One-way operation	S41	Frankfurter Allee Ringbahn (clockwise)
Landsberger Allee Ringbahn (counter-clockwise)	S42	Frankfurter Allee One-way operation
Landsberger Allee towards Birkenwerder	S8	Frankfurter Allee towards Wildau
Landsberger Allee towards Waidmannslust	S85	Frankfurter Allee towards Grünau
Location

Storkower Straße is a railway station in the Prenzlauer Berg locality of Berlin, close to the locality's border with Fennpfuhl. Located at the Ringbahn it is served by the S-Bahn lines S41, S42, S8 and S85.

== History ==
The station was opened in 1881 under the name of Zentralviehhof, as the vast area south of the station then was the site of Berlin's central slaughterhouse that received animals by rail here. An over 400-metre (0.25 mi) long pedestrian bridge (called the Langer Jammer, i.e. "Long Misery") crossed the processing plant connecting the station with the Friedrichshain residential areas.

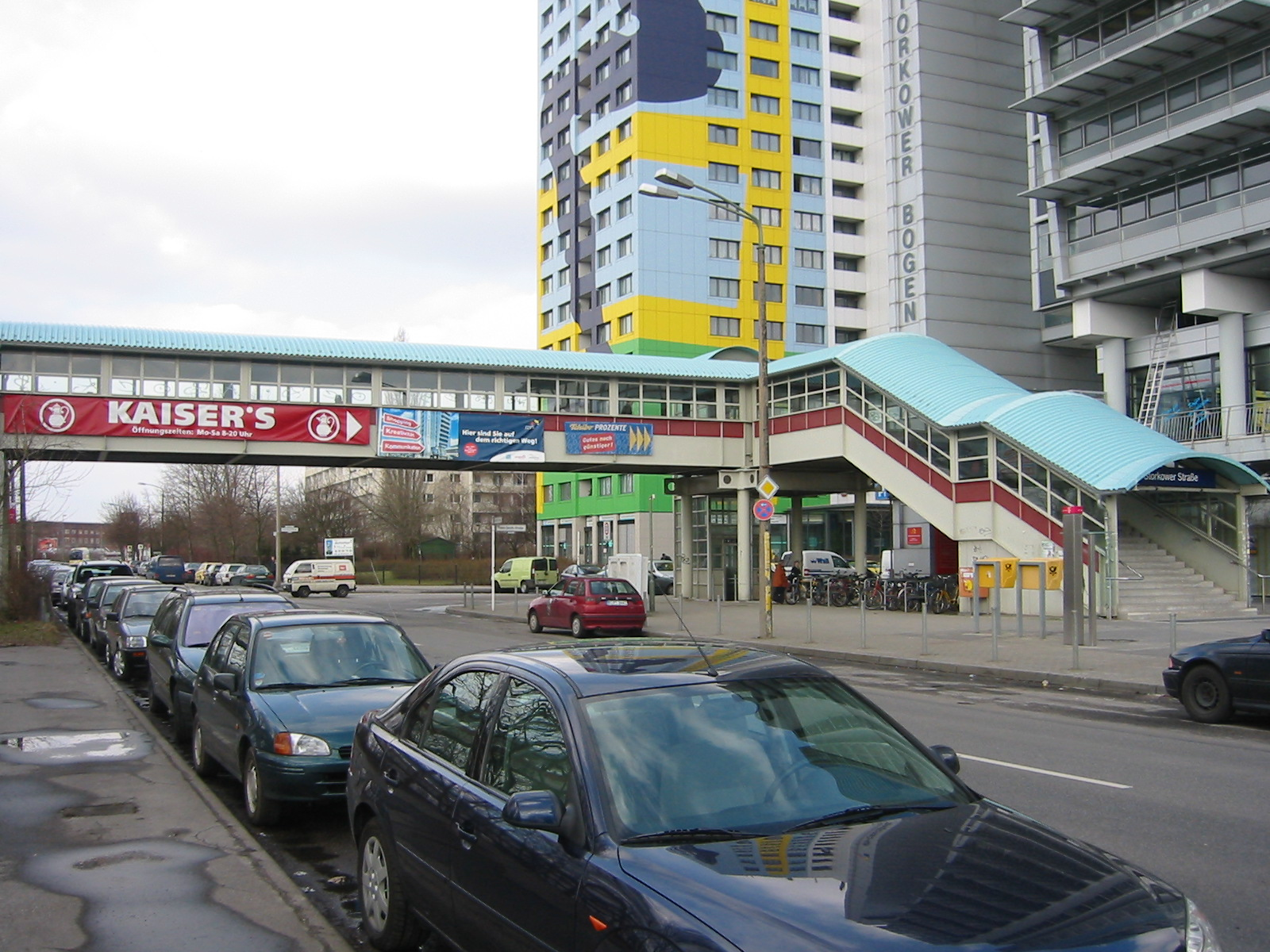
The northern entrance to the station on Storkower Straße

The station was renamed in the 1970s, while in 1991 the slaughterhouse finally closed. The notorious bridge except for about 150 m (490 ft) above the tracks was demolished in 2002. The remaining portion of the bridge, which stretches from Storkower Straße north of the station to Hermann-Blankenstein-Straße south of the station, was renovated and now serves as the only entrance and exit to the station.
