= Berlin Frankfurter Allee station =

Railway station in Berlin, Germany

Berlin Frankfurter Allee
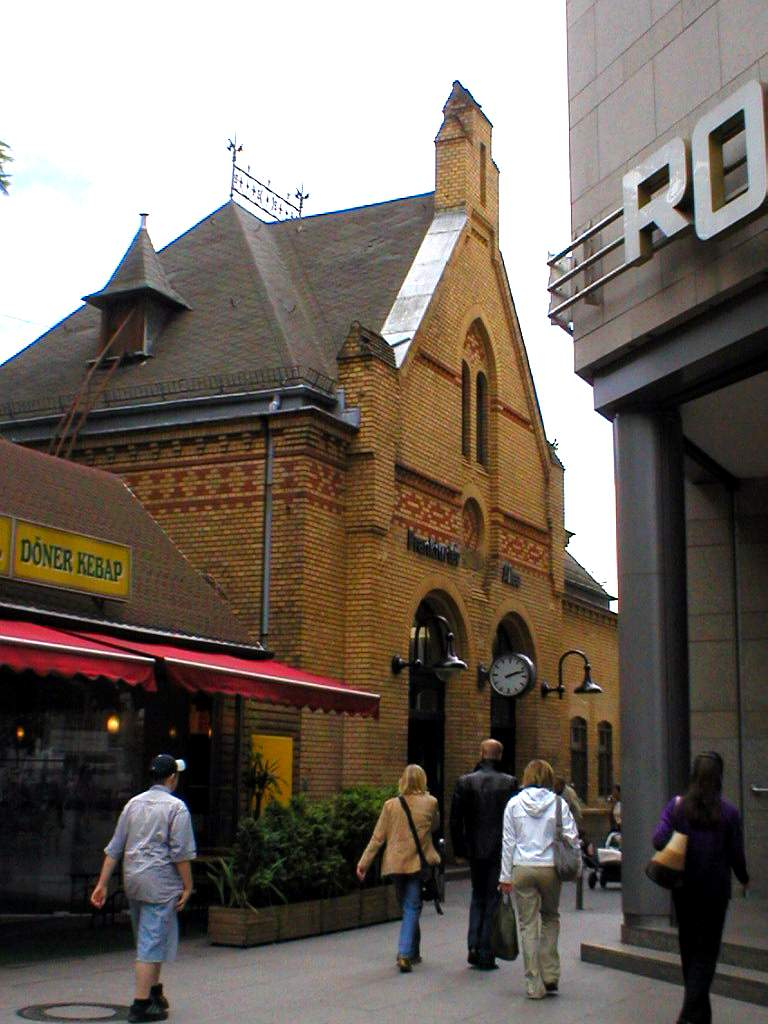
- Entrance building

General information
- Location: Berlin, Berlin; Germany
- Coordinates: 52°30′51″N 13°28′29″E
- Owner: DB Netz
- Operator: DB Station&Service
- Line: Ringbahn (KBS 200.41, 200.42, 200.8, 200.85)
- Platforms: 1 island platform
- Tracks: 2
- Connections: U5

Construction
- Structure type: Embankment

Other information
- Station code: 526
- DS100 code: BFAL
- Category: 4
- Fare zone: VBB: Berlin A/5555
- Website: www.bahnhof.de

History
- Opened: 1 May 1872; 154 years ago 21 December 1930; 95 years ago
- Electrified: 1 February 1929; 97 years ago
- Former names: 1872–1897 Friedrichsberg; 1897–1949 Frankfurter Allee; 1949–1961 Stalinallee

Key dates
- 1890/1891: current building erected

Services
Preceding station	Berlin S-Bahn	Following station
Storkower Straße One-way operation	S41	Ostkreuz Ringbahn (clockwise)
Storkower Straße Ringbahn (counter-clockwise)	S42	Ostkreuz One-way operation
Storkower Straße towards Birkenwerder	S8	Ostkreuz towards Wildau
Storkower Straße towards Waidmannslust	S85	Ostkreuz towards Grünau
Preceding station	Berlin U-Bahn	Following station
Samariterstraße towards Berlin Hbf	U5 transfer at Frankfurter Allee	Magdalenenstraße towards Hönow
Location

Berlin Frankfurter Allee is a railway station situated on Frankfurter Allee in the Friedrichshain district of Berlin, close to the district's border with Lichtenberg. It is served by the S-Bahn lines S41, S42 (the ringbahn), S8, S85 and the U-Bahn line U5.

== History ==
The station was first opened on 1 May 1872 as Friedrichsberg. In 1890-91 the current station Frankfurter Allee was erected, in addition to the platform between the tracks, the station had a brick entrance building. When the U5 was built at the end of the 1920s, the old Ringbahn bridge was torn down and replaced with a wider bridge. There was intended to be a direct connection between the underground U5 station and the above ground S-bahn station;- however, this was never developed. It is not practical to build such a connection now as the S-bahn platform would need to be on the bridge over the road. As the rails are not wide apart enough to fit a platform between them, the bridge would need to be entirely rebuilt. The station was named Stalinallee between 1949 and 1961.
