= Berlin Schönhauser Allee station =

Station of the Berlin U-Bahn

Coordinates: 52°32′58″N 13°24′50″E

Schönhauser Allee
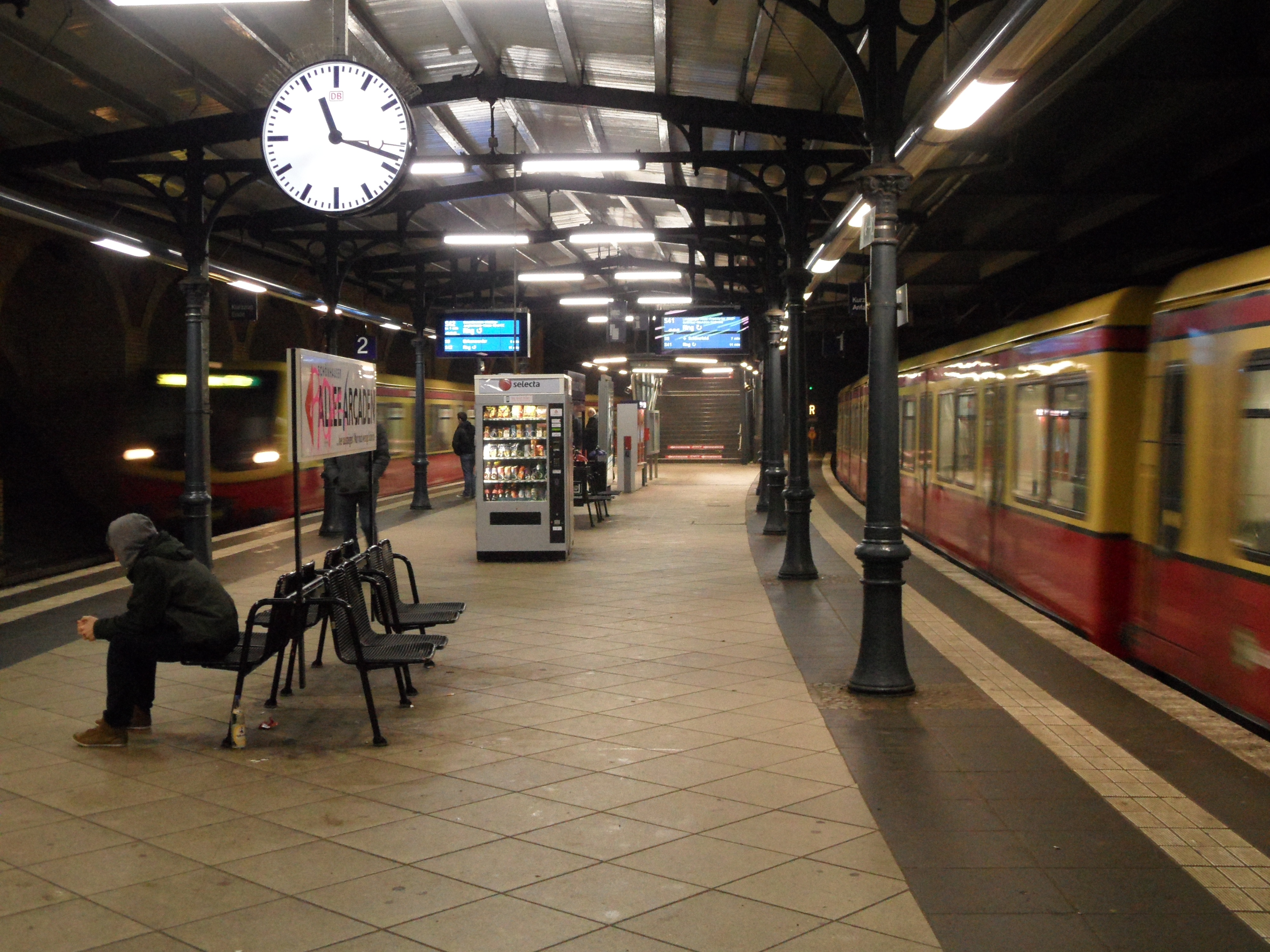

General information
- Owner: DB Netz
- Operator: DB Station&Service
- Line: Ringbahn
- Platforms: 1 island platform
- Tracks: 2
- Connections: S41 S42 S8 S85 U2

Construction
- Structure type: Below grade (S-Bahn); Elevated (U-bahn)

Other information
- Fare zone: VBB: Berlin A/5555

History
- Opened: :1 August 1879; 147 years ago : 1913; 113 years ago

Services
Preceding station	Berlin S-Bahn	Following station
Gesundbrunnen One-way operation	S41	Prenzlauer Allee Ringbahn (clockwise)
Gesundbrunnen Ringbahn (counter-clockwise)	S42	Prenzlauer Allee One-way operation
Bornholmer Straße towards Birkenwerder	S8	Prenzlauer Allee towards Wildau
Bornholmer Straße towards Waidmannslust	S85	Prenzlauer Allee towards Grünau
Preceding station	Berlin U-Bahn	Following station
Eberswalder Straße towards Ruhleben	U2	Vinetastraße towards Pankow
Route map
U-Bahn station
S-Bahn station
Location

Berlin Schönhauser Allee is a U-Bahn and S-Bahn railway station in the Prenzlauer Berg district of Berlin, servicing the U2 as well as S-Bahn routes S8, S41, S42, and S85. Built in 1913 and opened as "Bahnhof Nordring", the station was renamed to "Schönhauser Allee" in 1936. On an average day approximately 500 trains and more than 26,000 people pass through the station.

At this station, the elevated U2 crosses the below-grade S-Bahn, while at the other crossing of the U2 and the Ringbahn, Messe-Nord/ICC S-Bahn station and Kaiserdamm U2 station, the U2 crosses S-Bahn below-ground on the bottom deck of a road bridge.

== S-Bahn Station ==
=== History ===
While this section of the Ringbahn was completed in 1871, the first major segment to open, a station on this location did not open until 1879. The first station building was constructed a decade later in 1889. The station received high ridership due to the development of the surrounding neighborhood, now called Prenzlauer Berg. Electric tram service along Schönhauser Allee began in 1900, further increasing ridership and heightening the importance of the station as a transport hub.

On June 27, 1922, an two overcrowded trains collided to the west of the station resulting in the deaths of 45 people, to date the deadliest railway accident in the history of Berlin. Most of the deaths were caused by people riding on the sides of the trains due to extreme overcrowding falling off of the sides and onto the tracks after the initial collision, directly into the path of each oncoming train.

Service was temporairly disrupted due to electricity shortages towards the end and immediately following the conclusion of World War II

After German reunification, plans were drawn up for transit-oriented development around the station including the construction of a shopping complex over the S-Bahn tracks. Since the station platforms would be almost completely covered by the new development, the station itself underwent a major renovation between 1995 and 1997. As part of the renovation, both surface station buildings were demolished. Once the renovation was complete construction began on the shopping market, with construction on the new Schönhauser Allee Arcade completed in 1999.

In Spring 2017, the S-Bahn platforms received a light refurbishment with new decorations placed on the arches of the northern retaining wall

== U-Bahn Station ==
=== History ===
Due to heavy ridership at the S-Bahn station and on its feeder tram routes, plans were drawn up in the 1900s for a rapid transit line linking Spittelmarkt to the Schönhauser Allee station on the Ringbahn via Alexanderplatz. Ministerial approval was granted on December 22, 1907, with construction commencing in March 1910. The entire segment was built in three years, opening for service in 1913, and traffic rose quickly due to the station's importance as a multimodal hub.

By 1929, the station had nine million passengers a year making it the fourth-busiest U-Bahn station in Berlin, behind only Potsdamer Platz (13 million), Alexanderplatz, and Hallesches Tor (11 million each). The 90-second headways required were difficult to maintain due to the station's function as a terminal for the route, and an extension to Vinetastraße was proposed to make turning trains easier, completed in 1930.

==== Second World War and Cold War ====
Schönhauser Allee station survived World War II with minor damage, however at the end of April 1945, train service was completely suspended due to the fighting in the capital. On May 26, 1945, the subway station reopened with single-track service between Alexanderplatz and Schönhauser Allee, and on June 8, double-track service was possible again. The line from Schönhauser Allee to Vinetastraße did not resume operations until August 1, 1945. With the reopening of the current Mohrenstraße station on August 18, 1950, the current U2 line was fully operational again.

In 1955/1956, the BVG-Ost built another entrance on the north side of the station to complement the southern and central exits. This entrance is clad in sandstone and leads into a narrow entrance hall lined with yellow tiles.

With the construction of the Berlin Wall in 1961, passenger flows shifted considerably.

Since the underground S-Bahn station at Potsdamer Platz was closed due to its location on the Berlin Wall, the escalators there were removed and used for the Schönhauser Allee station. A direct connection between the S-Bahn and U-Bahn lines, with a narrow tunnel between the two platforms, was opened in 1962. On the occasion of Berlin's 750th anniversary in 1987, the U-Bahn station, like several neighboring stations, received among other things a fresh coat of paint. However, a major renovation was never undertaken before German reunification.

==== Post-Reunification ====
As part of the U2 extension to Pankow, the BVG renovated the entire elevated railway viaduct between Senefelderplatz and Vinetastraße, and also repaired the station.

Since 2004, the BVG has been renovating the station in individual projects. Since then, an elevator has been installed between the platform and street level. In 2005/2006, the BVG renovated the central entrance to the S-Bahn, and in 2007, the southern entrance. The station was renovated again in 2010.

== Gallery ==
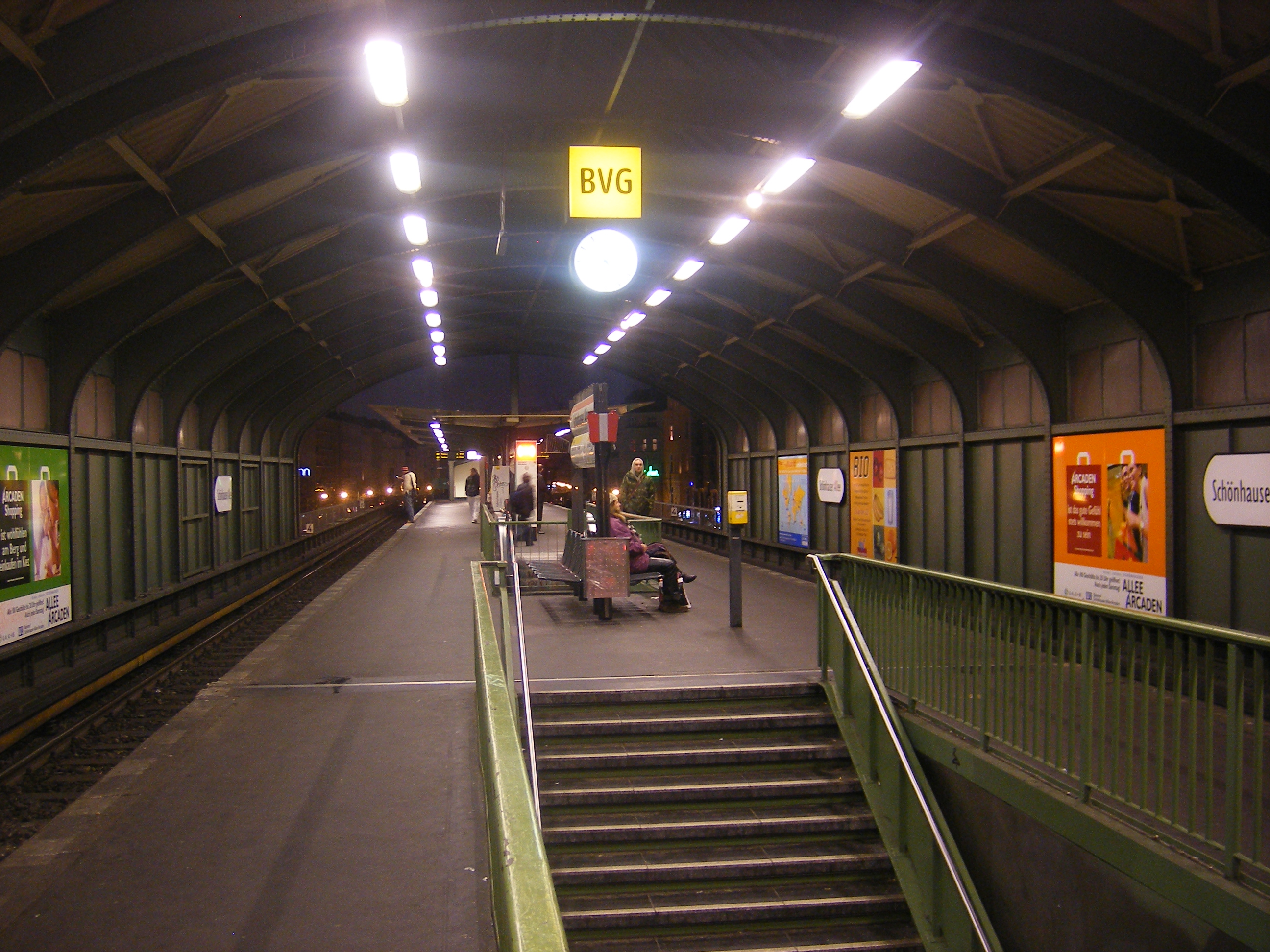
U-Bahn platforms at Schönhauser Allee

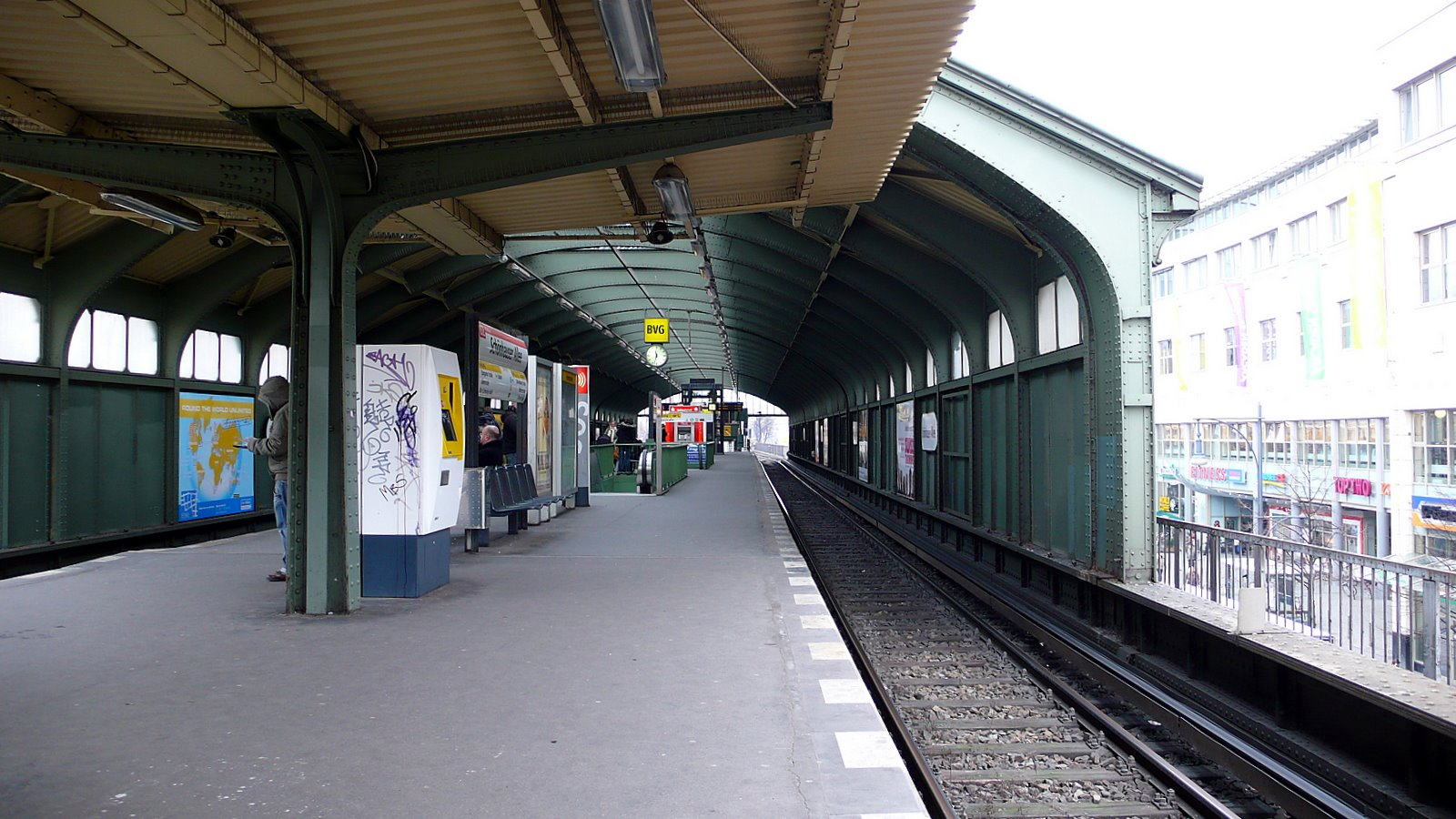
U-Bahn Platform
