= Fennpfuhl =

- Quarter of Berlin
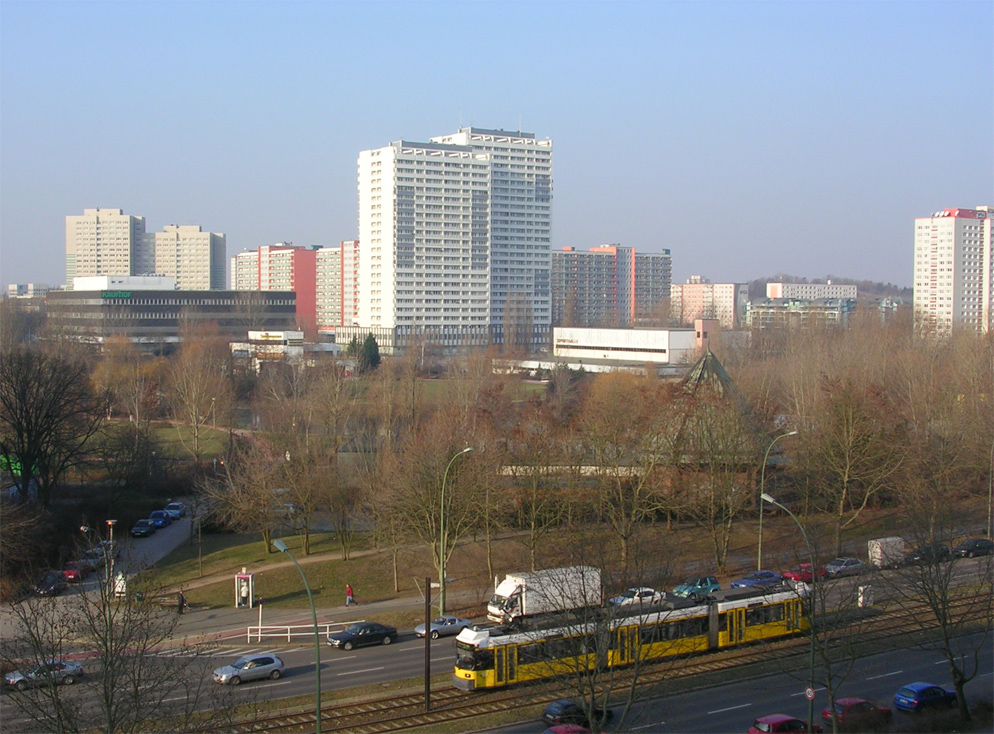
- Skyline with the Fennpfuhlpark

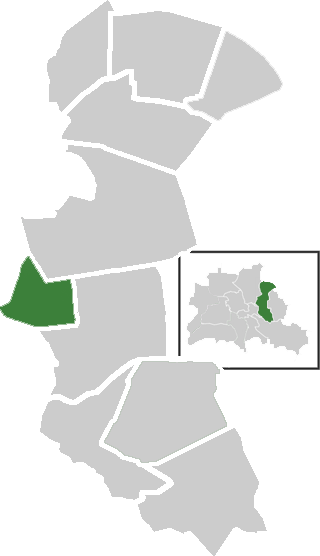
- Location of Fennpfuhl in Lichtenberg district and Berlin
- Interactive map of Fennpfuhl
- Location within Germany Location within Berlin
- Coordinates: 52°31′42″N 13°28′27″E
- Country: Germany
- State: Berlin
- City: Berlin
- Borough: Lichtenberg
- Founded: 1961

Area
  - Total: 2.12 km^{2} (0.82 sq mi)
- Elevation: 60 m (200 ft)

Population (2024-12-31)
  - Total: 34,484
  - Density: 16,300/km^{2} (42,100/sq mi)
- Time zone: UTC+01:00 (CET)
  - Summer (DST): UTC+02:00 (CEST)
- Postal codes: 10369
- Vehicle registration: B
- Website: Official website

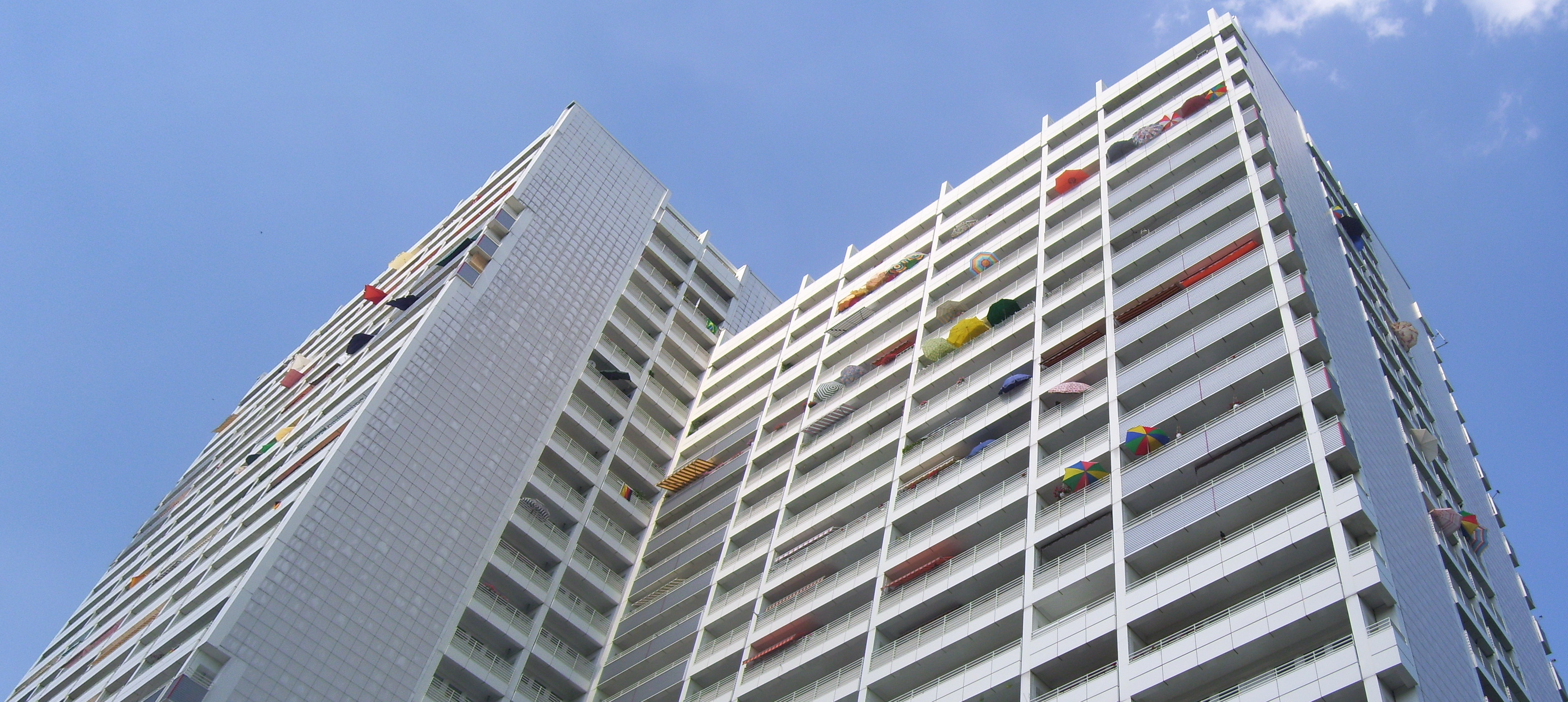
Skyscraper on Anton-Saefkow-Platz

Fennpfuhl (German: [ˈfɛnˌp͡fuːl]) is a German locality (Ortsteil) in the borough (Bezirk) of Lichtenberg, Berlin. With a population of 30,932 (2008) in an area of 2.12 km^{2} (0.82 sq mi), it is the second most densely populated locality in Berlin (14,591/km²) after Friedenau.

== History ==
In April 1961, the land development of the area called Lichtenberg (Nord) at that time, was begun and planning was subdivided into three sections. The area to be built upon covered an area of 175 hectares (430 acres). In the Erich-Kuttner-Straße on the edge of the area (section I), the first Plattenbau, one of the most commonly built type of residence in East Germany, was built. The building, which was built as an experimental sample is under monument protection today. On December 2 1972, construction of the quarter began, the plan being to develop an area for almost 50,000 inhabitants. Populated since the early 1970s, it was officially completed on May 12, 1986.

== Geography ==
Fennpfuhl is situated in the eastern side of the city on the outside edge of the Hundekopf (dog's head), the colloquial name for central Berlin surrounded by the Ringbahn. It borders the localities of Lichtenberg, Alt-Hohenschönhausen, Weißensee and Prenzlauer Berg (both in Pankow district). An urban park (Fennpfuhlpark), characterized by numerous sculptures is situated in the middle of the quarter.

== Transport ==
As urban railways, the locality is served by the S-Bahn lines S4 (Ringbahn), S8 and S9, at the stations of Storkower Straße and Landsberger Allee. It is also served by the tramway lines M5, M6, M8, M13, 16 and 21.

== Photo gallery ==
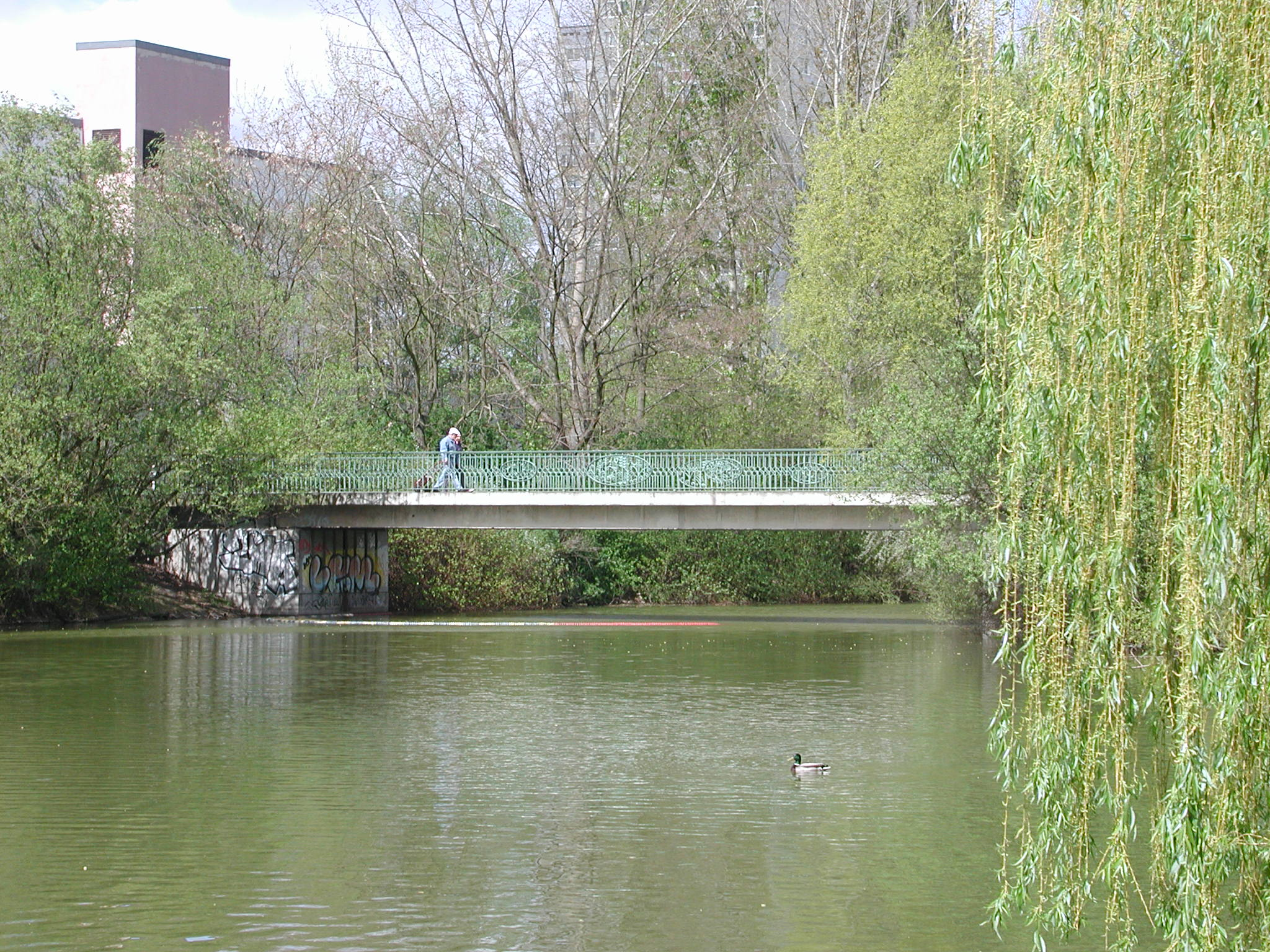
A bridge on the lake in Fennpfuhlpark

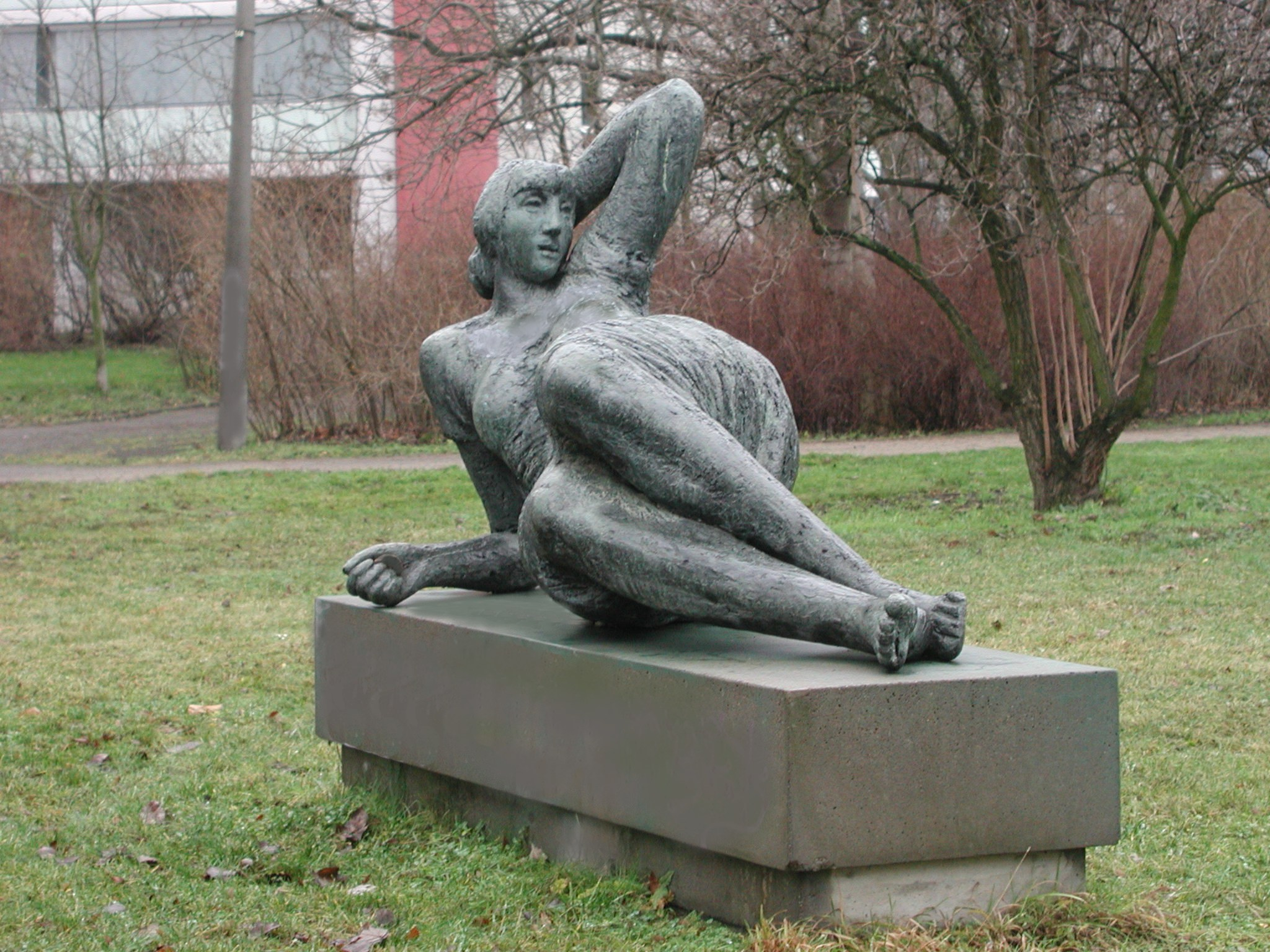
The sculpture "Große Liegende" by Siegfried Krepp in Fennpfuhlpark

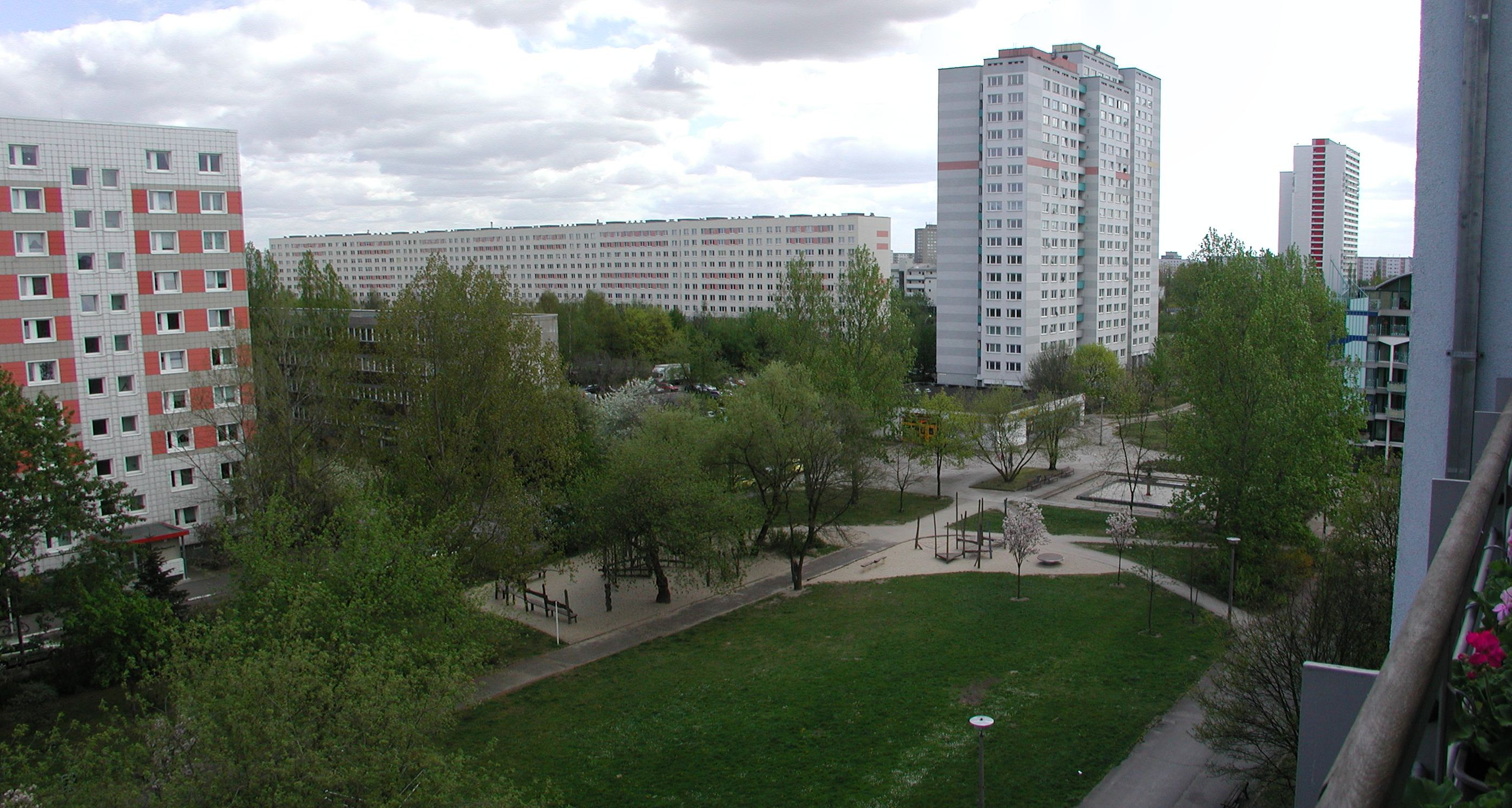
Otto-Marquardt-Straße
