= Prenzlauer Allee =

Street in Berlin, Germany

Coordinates: 52°32′39″N 13°25′38″E

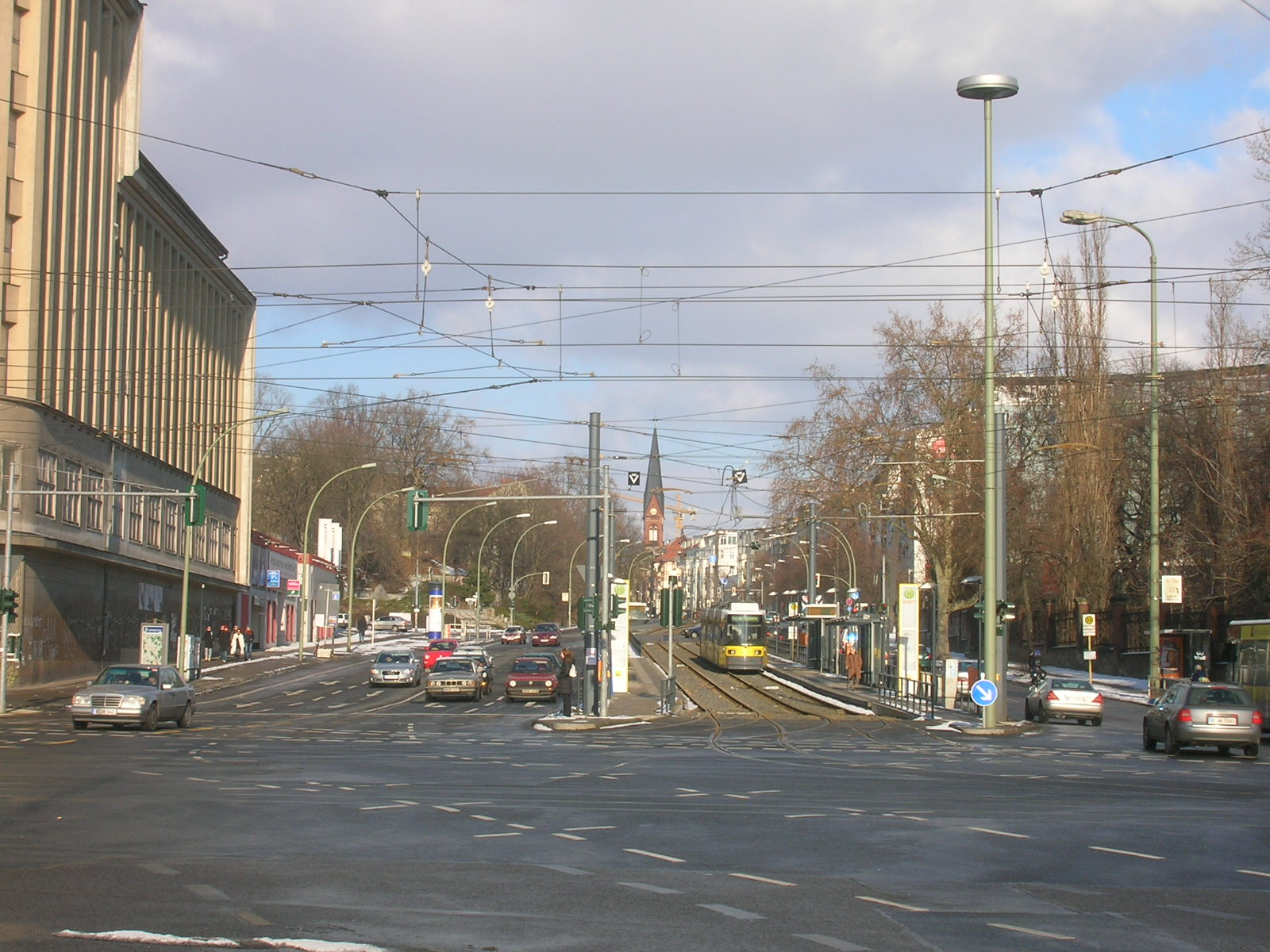
Prenzlauer Tor

Prenzlauer Allee is a major avenue in the Prenzlauer Berg district of the German capital Berlin and one of the main thoroughfares of the north-eastern Pankow borough. The arterial road connects the centre of former East Berlin at Alexanderplatz via Karl-Liebknecht-Straße with the far north-eastern districts and the orbital motorway Berliner Ring (BAB 10) via the Bundesautobahn 114.

It starts at Prenzlauer Tor, formerly the site of a historic city gate on the road to Prenzlau, leading uphill northwards to the border with the Pankow district, where it continues as Prenzlauer Promenade. Between the dual carriageway run the tracks of the Berlin tram M2 line. The Ringbahn of the Berlin S-Bahn network stops at Berlin Prenzlauer Allee station.

== History ==
The road was used early on as a long-distance trade route to Prenzlau, hence its later name. Until about 1824, it was called Heinersdorfer Weg; Heinersdorf was the first village on the road outside Berlin. With the design and planning by Salomo Sachs and the approval of a new building on 3 December 1824, it was named Prenzlauer Chaussee and from 1878 was finally designated an Allee. A newly founded stock corporation and the Prussian government implemented Sachs' plans.
