= Berlin-Waidmannslust station =

Railway station in Berlin, Germany

Coordinates: 52.6064°N 13.3211°E

Waidmannslust
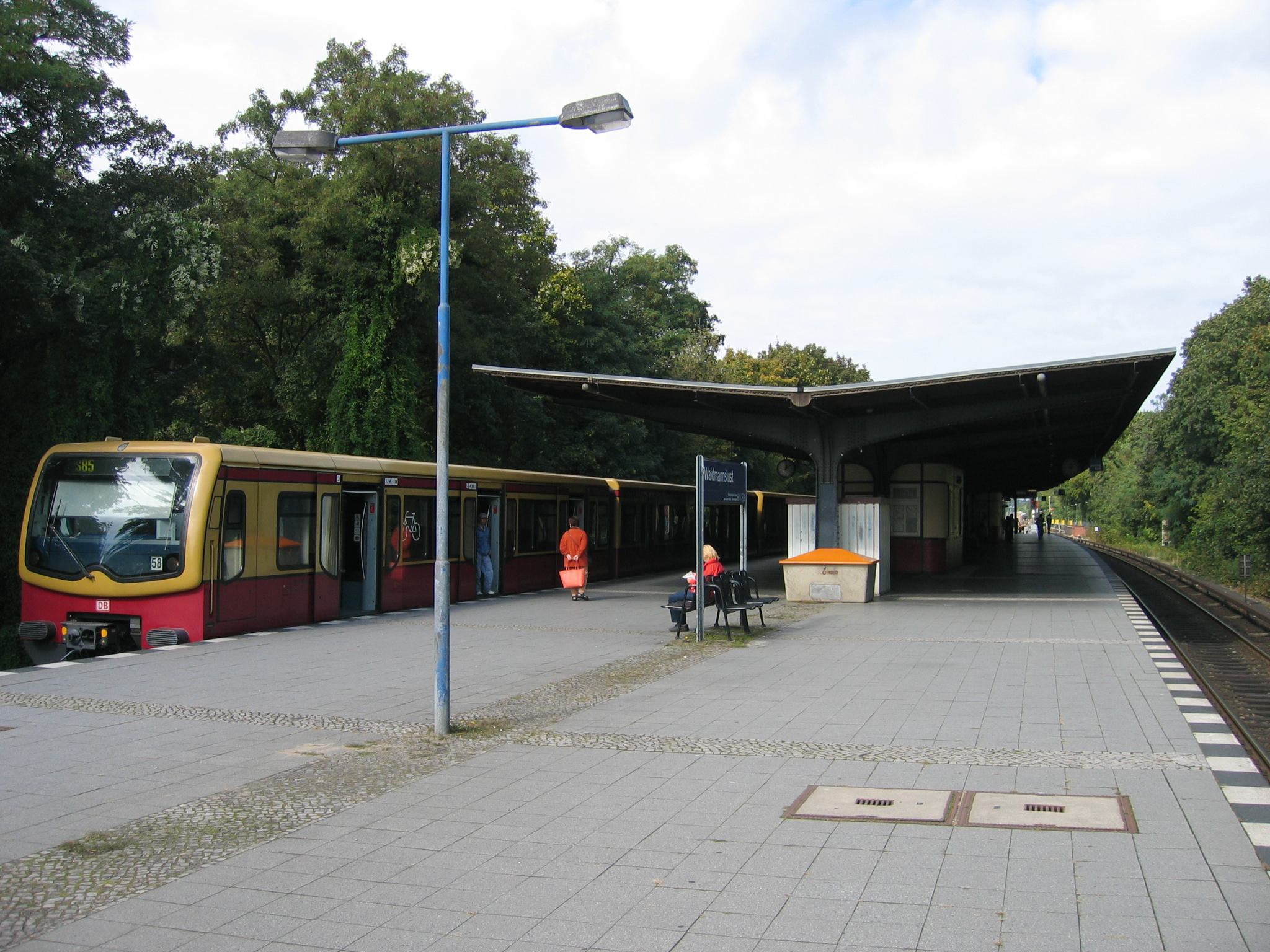

General information
- Location: Waidmannslust, Reinickendorf, Berlin; Germany
- Line: Northern Railway
- Platforms: 1
- Tracks: 2

Other information
- Station code: 6472
- DS100 code: BWAI
- Category: 4
- Fare zone: : Berlin B/5656

History
- Opened: 20 May 1884; 142 years ago
- Electrified: 5 June 1925; 101 years ago

Services
Preceding station	Berlin S-Bahn	Following station
Hermsdorf towards Oranienburg	S1	Wittenau towards Wannsee
Terminus	S85	Wittenau towards Grünau
Location

Berlin-Waidmannslust (in German S-Bahnhof Berlin-Waidmannslust) is a railway station in the neighbourhood of Waidmannslust, in the city of Berlin, Germany. It is served by the Berlin S-Bahn and by several local buses.

== History ==
On 20 May 1884 the former colony of Waidmannslust received its own demand point at the Berlin Nordbahn. This was financed by the forester and innkeeper Ernst Bondick, who in this time the development and settlement of his lands promoted. Bondick took a particularly clever approach here: on the day on which a count of the departing passengers was on a trial basis, he invited all acquaintances to his restaurant, so that the railway administration was impressed by the rush and set up a permanent operation. Since long ago, the northern runway between Berlin and Stralsund had been operating here since 1877. From 1891 the line was double-railed and raised in the years 1908-1912 on their current level, here were built by the long-distance tracks separate suburban tracks between Gesundbrunnen and Frohnau. The station building and the bridges over the Waidmannsluster Damm date from this time and are now a listed building. On 5 June 1925 the line was electrified as far as Birkenwerder, then later to Oranienburg.

On 2 May 1929 the extension of the tram line along the Wittenauer Cyclopstraße (now partially Jean-Jaurès-Straße) to Waidmannslust station was opened with line 68. With the increased wartime adjustment of bus lines came on 16 October 1939 the amplifier line 274 added. Both lines then operated until 1 July 1942 to the station Waidmannslust.

After 1945, the section Wilhelmsruh-Birkenwerder was reduced to one track each for long-distance and commuter rail. Since there were no evasive routes along the route, the trains could only run at hourly intervals. Only in 1948 was the clock by two dodges in Waidmannslust and Frohnau compressed to 20 minutes. After 1952, in addition, the long-distance traffic in the Berlin area, since the route was now in the western part of the city, abandoned, the tracks were not used for the expansion of the S -Bahn line.

During the construction of the Berlin Wall in 1961, the S-Bahn between the stations Frohnau and Hohen Neuendorf was interrupted. In the same year the southern entrance was bricked up. Despite the shrinking passenger numbers as a result of the S-Bahn boycott, which began after 1961, operations along the northern runway were maintained and continued even after the Reichsbahn strike in 1980. Only with the assumption of the operating rights by the BVG on 9 January 1984 was the short-term decommissioning. Since the passengers after the takeover with massive protests for an operation pronounced, was already on 1 October 1984 the traffic resumed until Frohnau. However, this only lasted until 5 May 1986, after which the route was extensively renovated and the second track completely restored. The work was completed on 22 December 1986.

In 2004, S85 had been introduced from this station to Grünau. In 2017, the S26 to Teltow Stadt replaced S85 service.

After German reunification, the gap was closed on the West Berlin city boundary between Frohnau and Hohen Neuendorf, so that since 31 May 1992 again continuous S-Bahn operation on the Northern Railway to Oranienburg is possible. A planned backfilling of the southern pedestrian tunnel prevented the district Reinickendorf, by taking over this in their own responsibility. In 2001, the access structure was renovated and restored to its original state. On 29 January 2007 an elevator was put into operation.

Since October 2011, the electronic interlocking Waidmannslust controls the section between Schönholz (a) and Hohen Neuendorf (a). This is the first section that has been converted to the new train control system of S-Bahn Berlin (ZBS). However, the building of the control computer is not at Waidmannslust station, but at Hermsdorf station. After several years of delays in March 2012 began the reconstruction of the previously closed southern platform access, in this course, the staircase and its roof were rebuilt. At the end of the same year, access was released. 900,000 euros were invested for this purpose.
