= Berlin Ringbahn =

Railway line in Germany

Berliner Ringbahn
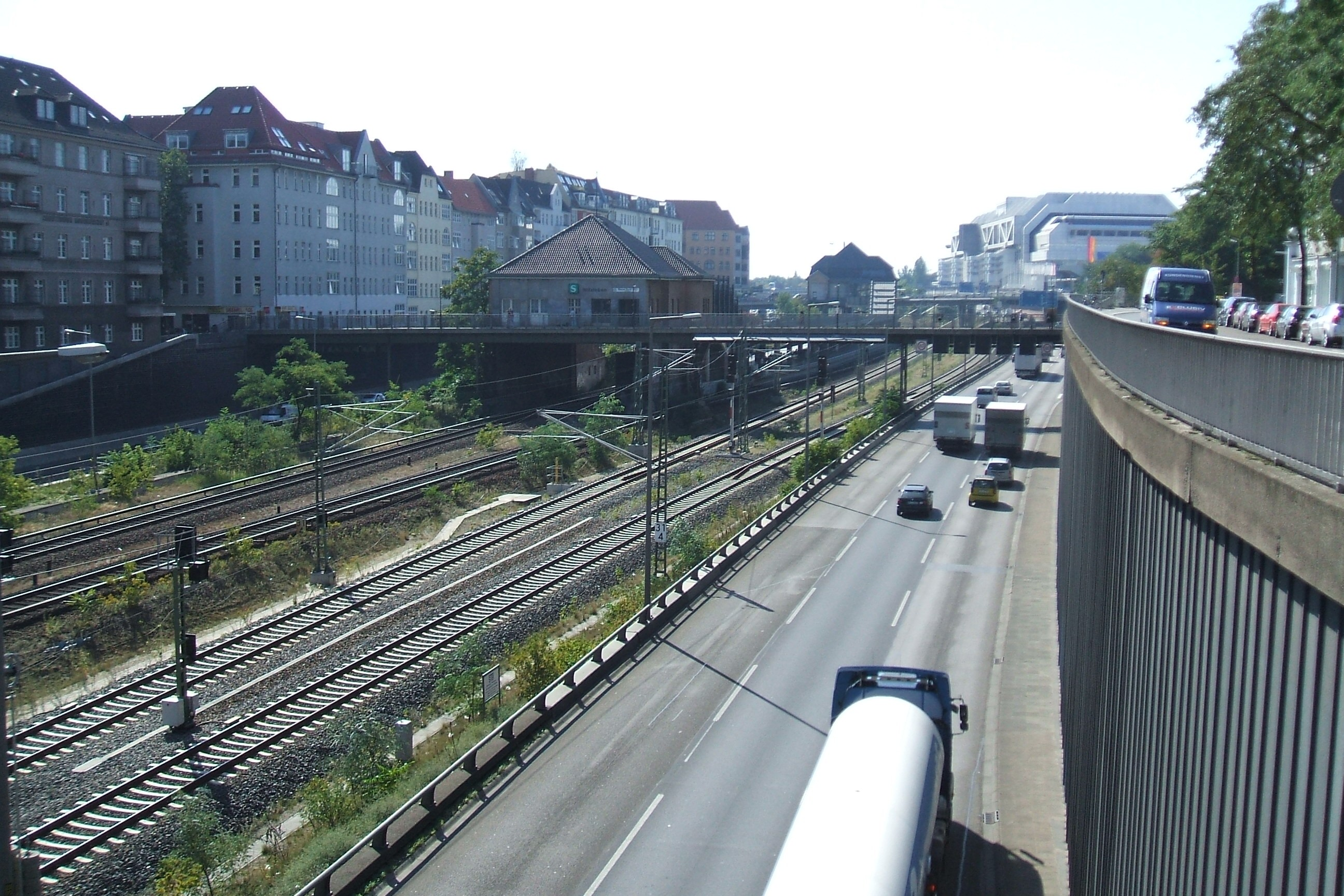
- Ringbahn, Messe Nord ICC station

Overview
- Line number: 6020 (S-Bahn); 6170 (mainline)
- Locale: Berlin, Germany

Service
- Route number: 200.41; 200.42

Technical
- Track gauge: 1,435 mm (4 ft 8 1/2 in) standard gauge
- Electrification: S-Bahn: 750 V third rail; main line: 15 kV/16.7 Hz AC overhead catenary
Route map
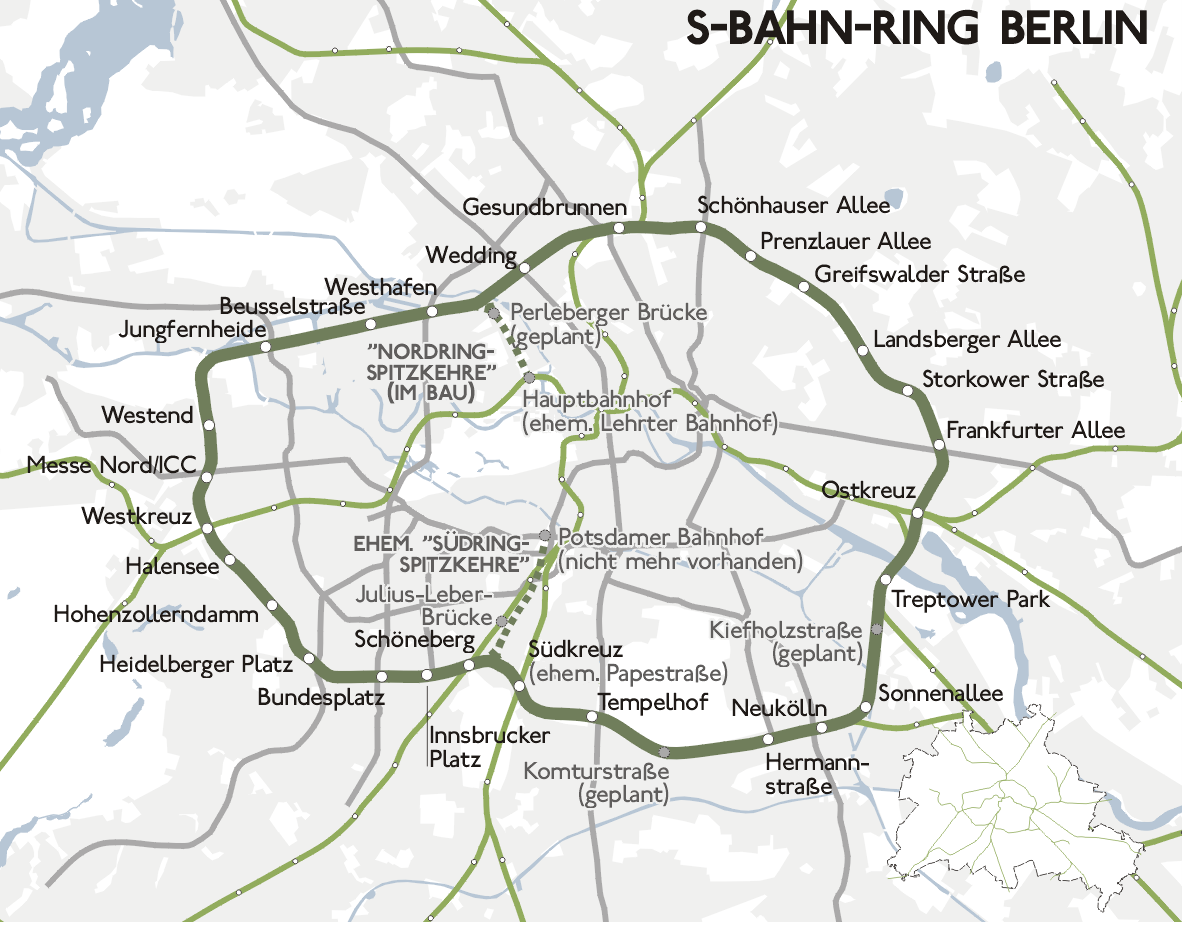
- Source: German railway atlas

The Ringbahn (German for circle railway) is a 37.5 km (23.3 mi) long circle route around Berlin's inner city area, on the Berlin S-Bahn network. Its course is made up of a pair of tracks used by S-Bahn trains and another parallel pair of tracks used by various regional, long distance and freight trains. The S-Bahn lines S41 and S42 provide a closed-loop continuous service without termini. Lines S45, S46 and S47 use a section of the southern and western ring, while lines S8 and S85 use sections of the eastern ring. The combined number of passengers is about 400,000 passengers a day. Due to its distinctive shape, the line is often referred to as the Hundekopf (Dog's Head).

The Ringbahn is bisected by an east–west railway thoroughfare called the Stadtbahn (city railway), which crosses the Ringbahn from Westkreuz (Western Cross) to Ostkreuz (Eastern Cross), forming a Südring (Southern Ring) and a Nordring (Northern Ring). The north-south S-Bahn link (with the North-South S-Bahn-tunnel as its core) divides the Ringbahn into a Westring (Western Ring) and an Ostring (Eastern Ring), crossing at Gesundbrunnen station in the north and both Schöneberg station and Südkreuz in the south. These four sections served as tariff zones of the suburban fare structure before World War II. Over time, these four rings ceased to exist with the removal of track connections. Only at Westkreuz does an original such track remain, used only for utility purposes. At Ostkreuz, a newly-designed bypass provides access to southern branches without having to enter the station. Gesundbrunnen is not a typical crossing, but rather has parallel tracks that curve to the south after leaving the station, allowing trains to run towards Südkreuz.

The approximately 88-square-kilometre (34 mi^{2}) area encompassed by the Ringbahn comprises the "Berlin A" zone in the Verkehrsverbund Berlin-Brandenburg's fare structure. The Ringbahn also serves as the border for Berlin's low-emission zone, established on 1 January 2008.

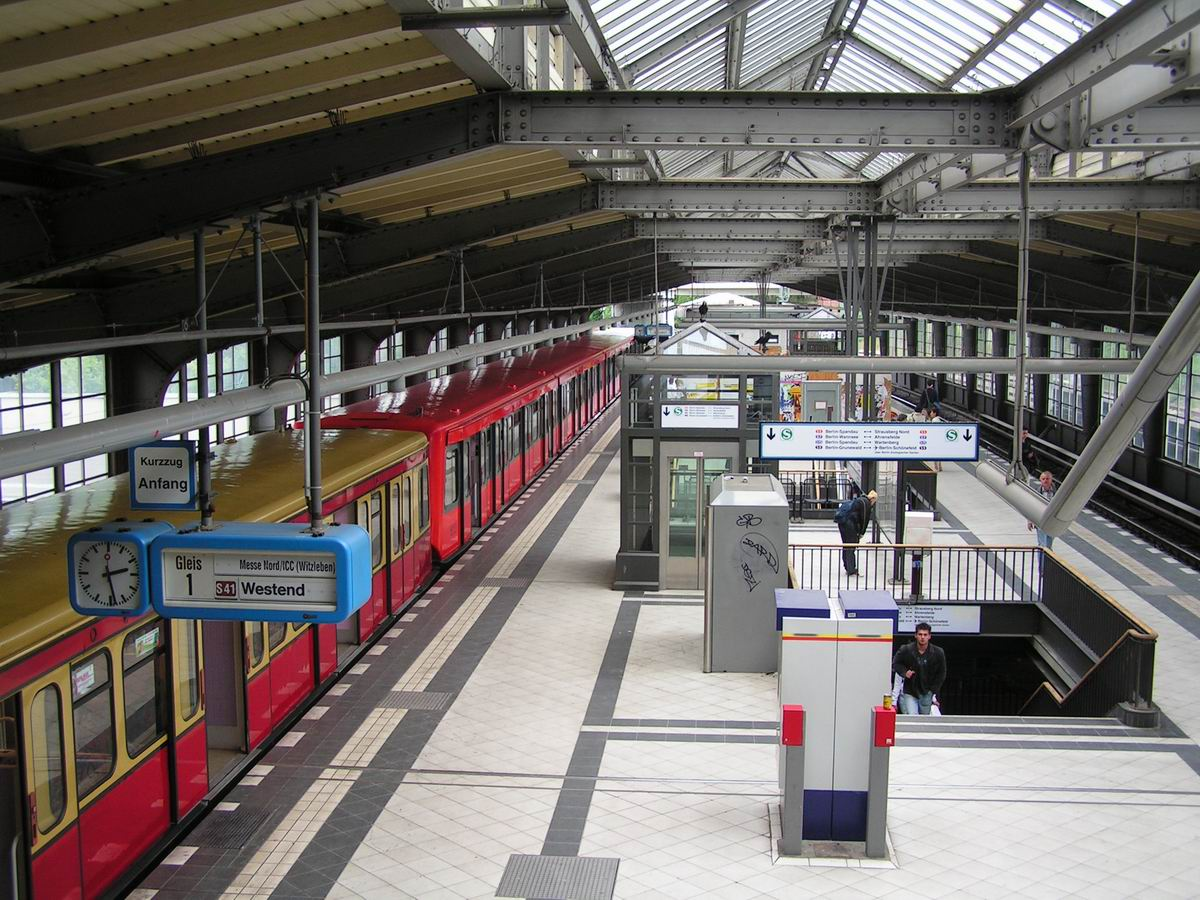
Ringbahn platform at Westkreuz

== History ==
=== Background ===
In 1851, the Königliche Bahnhofs-Verbindungsbahn (Royal Station Connection Railway) was completed between the termini of some railroads terminating in Berlin: initially the Stettiner Bahnhof and the Anhalter Bahnhof, but later to include the Schlesischer Bahnhof. It was laid in the streets, which disrupted traffic as well as local residents. Thus, in order to reduce disruption of traffic, trains ran at night, as the train bell had to be rung constantly.

Plans were soon developed to build a ring line primarily for freight, running outside the then city limits. Funding for construction was possible only after the victory in the war with Austria of 1866. The Lower Silesia-March [of Brandenburg] Railway Company was commissioned to construct and manage the line: construction began in 1867 and was completed in 1877.

=== Route ===
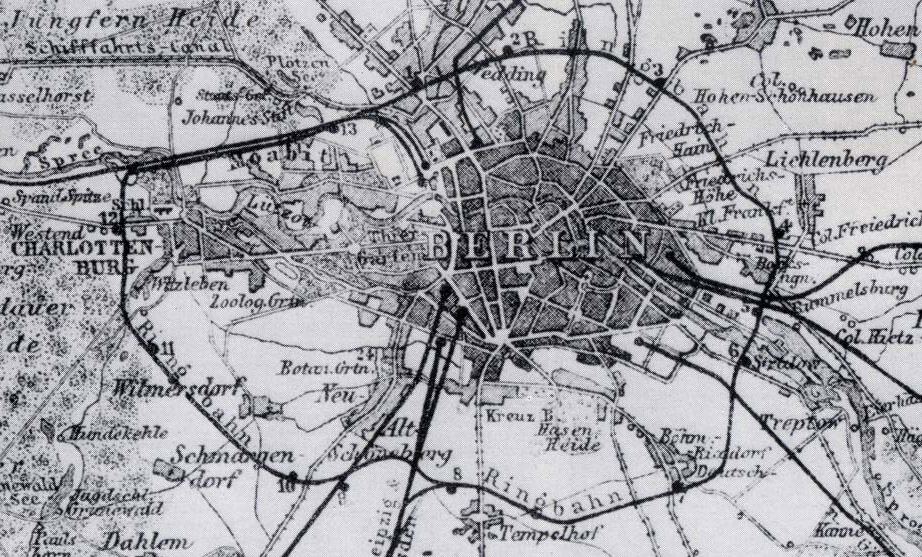
Ring Railway in 1877

The first section opened on 17 July 1871 from Moabit through Gesundbrunnen, Central-Viehhof (now Storkower Straße), Stralau-Rummelsburg (now Ostkreuz), Rixdorf (now Neukölln) and Schöneberg (later Kolonnenstraße, at the side where there is the new Julius-Leber-Brücke) to Potsdamer station (and, from 1891 onward, to a separate annex, Potsdamer ring station). From there, trains returned in the opposite direction. The line crossed the Anhalt Railway (and later the Royal Prussian Military Railway) on bridges.

With the opening of the section from Schöneberg through the still-independent city of Charlottenburg (now Westend station) to Moabit on 15 November 1877, the ring was complete for freight and long-distance trains, while the suburban trains running on the Ringbahn would still visit and reverse at Potsdamer station in the city center, turning north from the ring, running parallel to the Berlin–Potsdam–Magdeburg Railway. This section from the actual ring into the Potsdamer ring station became known as the Südringspitzkehre (Southern ring switchback or hairpin turn), reflecting the need for trains to reverse there to continue their trip around the ring. Passengers could change at the Kolonnenstraße station across the platform to continue to ride on the Ringbahn without going all the way to the Potsdamer Ringbahnhof.

From 1 January 1872 onwards, freight was carried on the line to freight yards separate from the passenger stations. The line was electrified in 1926. In 1930, ring line operation was combined with the Stadtbahn and suburban services as the Berlin S-Bahn.

Since the trains were pulled by steam locomotives, they had to be refilled with water and coal and serviced at relatively short intervals; this was possible by reversing at Potsdamer Bahnhof. Even after electrification, the management of the railway company wanted to spare the passengers the need to change at the Papestraße or Schöneberg stations to a properly provisioned train traveling from the suburbs to downtown Berlin. Originally, there were not even the necessary rails for continuing on the Ringbahn between Schöneberg and Papestraße stations.

The Reichsbahn planned to replace the level crossings between the Ringbahn and Südringspitzkehre with over- and underpasses together with the building of the north-south S-Bahn line in the late 1930s, but this was omitted as one of many planned changes after the proclamation of Hitler's Welthauptstadt Germania on 30 January 1937. In World War II, the Potsdamer and Anhalter stations were heavily bombed; the Südringspitzkehre was closed in 1944 and was never reopened.

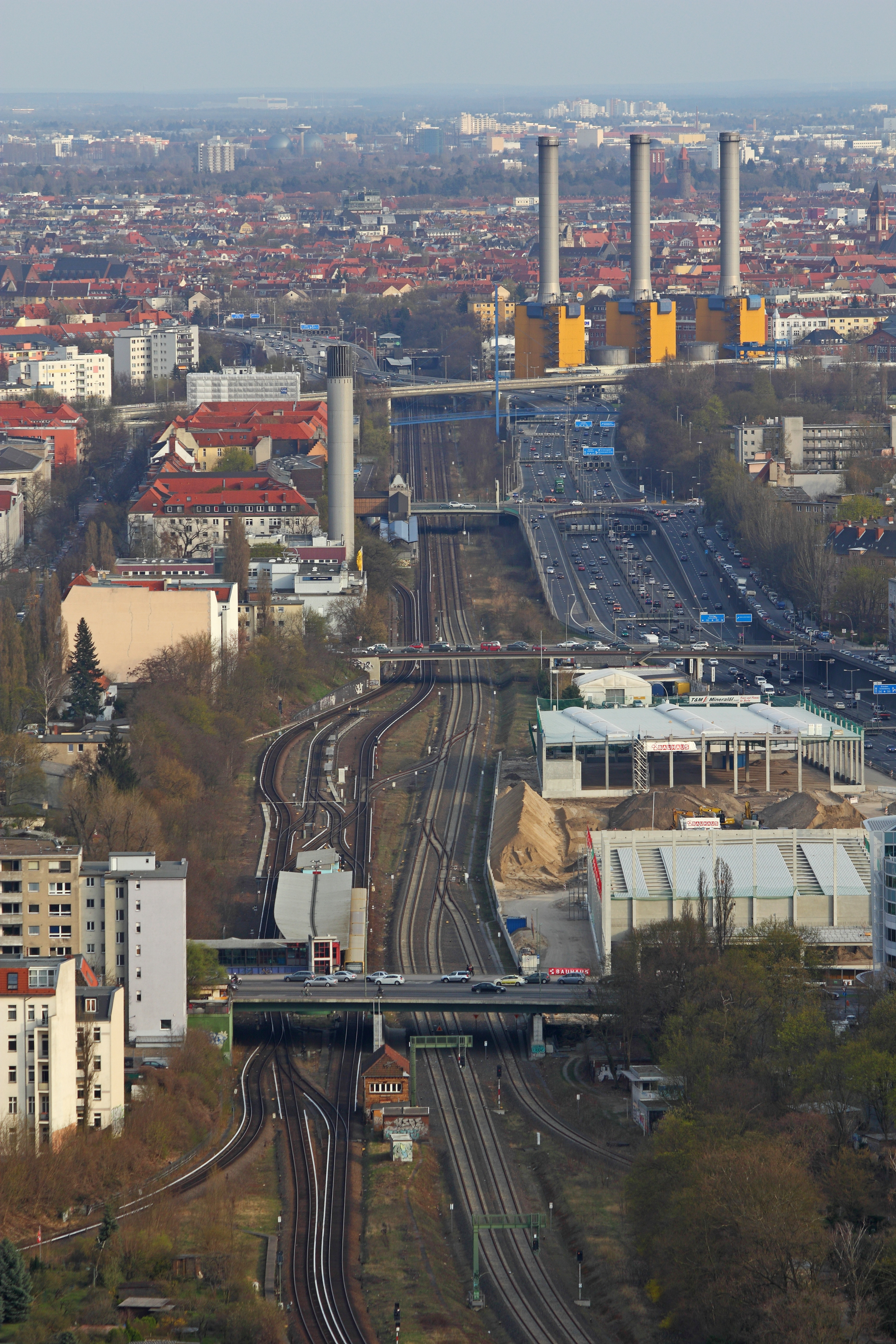
Ringbahn, as seen from Funkturm Berlin

=== The Berlin Wall division ===
From 1944 until the construction of the Berlin Wall in 1961, S-Bahn trains ran over the direct line between Papestraße (now Südkreuz) and Schöneberg opened in 1933, making a complete circle. With the building of the Wall, the line was broken in two places:

- In West Berlin a separate line on a three-quarter ring ran between Gesundbrunnen and Sonnenallee or Köllnische Heide.
- In East Berlin the remaining section ran between Schönhauser Allee and Treptower Park, on the suburban lines to Bernau and Königs Wusterhausen or Schönefeld Airport.

The building of the Berlin Wall in 1961 prevented continuous operation, after which passenger numbers on the West Berlin side, between Gesundbrunnen and Sonnenallee, declined. This was caused partly by a politically motivated call for a boycott, because revenue from the West Berlin S-Bahn, which was operated by East German railways, supported the East German government. The East Berlin section, from Schönhauser Allee to Treptower Park, remained in operation as it formed part of a major north-south tangent.

After the 1980 S-Bahn strike, service on the western part of the ring was suspended for about 13 years.

On 9 January 1984, a treaty between East Germany and the West Berlin Senate came into force and turned over responsibility for operation of the S-Bahn in West Berlin to the West Berlin transport authority BVG. It was initially planned to restore the section between Westend and Sonnenallee.

=== Reunification ===
After German reunification in 1990, plans were changed, so that in 1993 the south ring was reopened to the junction with the line towards Baumschulenweg with a connection to the Goerlitz line. The reconstruction of the connection between Sonnenallee and Treptow Park required large-scale renovation that was not feasible in the short term. The western part of the ring line was put back into operation in stages:

- 17 December 1993: Between Baumschulenweg, Neukölln and Westend
- 15 April 1997: Between Westend and Jungfernheide
- 19 December 1997: Between Neukölln and Treptower Park
- 19 December 1999: Between Jungfernheide and Westhafen
- 17 September 2001: Between Schönhauser Allee and Gesundbrunnen, over the old border, and the part of the section from Bornholmer Straße to Schönhauser Allee is closed for reconstruction work.

More than 12 years after the fall of the Wall, the last gap of the S-Bahn between Westhafen, Wedding and Gesundbrunnen, was fully restored on 16 June 2002. Promotional material for the reopening referred this as the "Wedding Day," an allusion to the English word "wedding." Services operated under the "screw concept," as trains entered the ring from the south at Neukölln and circled around it one and a half times, at the time the trip around the ring could not be achieved in less than 63 minutes.

Since 28 May 2006, circular service has been operated as lines S41 (clockwise) and S42 (anticlockwise). Trains take around 60 minutes, running every five minutes in peak hours and every ten minutes between the peaks, and in the evenings, using the greatly accelerated 481/482 series trains. Some sections of the ring are used by other lines. On the southern ring from the Görlitz line in the southeast, line S47 terminates at Hermannstraße, S46 at Westend and S45 at Berlin Südkreuz station, with some terminating at Bundesplatz. On the eastern section of the ring, lines S8, S85 and S9 operate between Schönhauser Allee and Treptower Park.

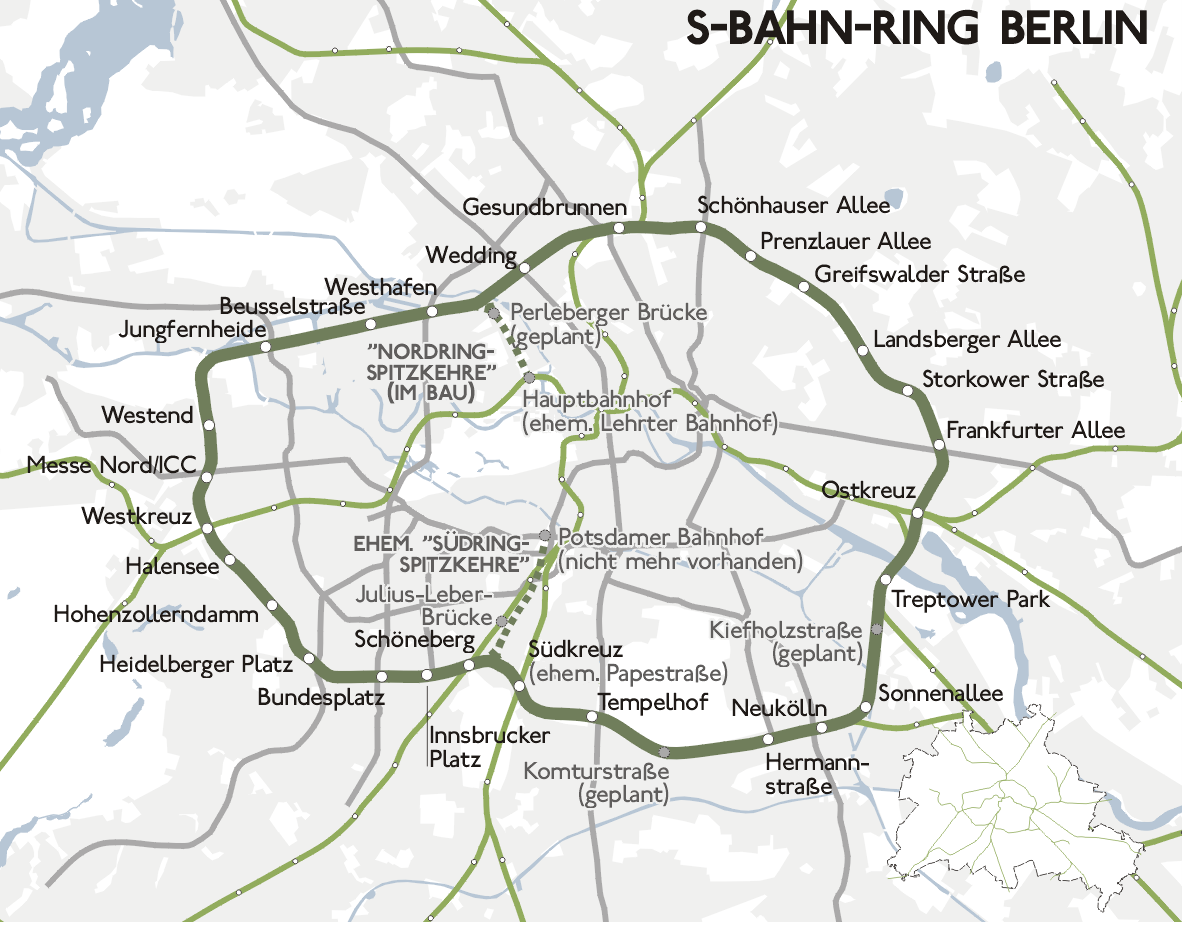

Overview
- Other name: Ringbahn
- Locale: Berlin

Service
- System: Berlin S-Bahn
- Operator(s): S-Bahn Berlin GmbH
- Rolling stock: DBAG Class 481; DBAG Class 483; DBAG Class 484

Technical
- Electrification: 750 V DC Third rail

== Services ==
Under what is called the "mushroom concept," the long-distance lines on the northern part of the ring for regional or long-distance services were rebuilt and electrified. On the ring line, regional and mainline services stop at Gesundbrunnen and regional services stop at Jungfernheide.

The majority of the former ring line freight yards have been closed down or dismantled. Part of the former freight inner ring between Neukölln and Tempelhof is still used for freight, with a depot at Berlin-Moabit. The freight line is closed in the vicinity of Südkreuz and Ostkreuz.

== Branches and connection curves ==
=== S-Bahn ===
Branches from the ring line are:

- from Gesundbrunnen and Schönhauser Allee via Bornholmer Straße to Pankow and Schönholz (operating)
- from Treptower Park and Neukölln to Baumschulenweg (operating)
- from Jungfernheide via Wernerwerk to Gartenfeld (Siemens Railway, out of service and partially dismantled)
- from Jungfernheide via Siemensstadt-Fürstenbrunn to Spandau (S-Bahn tracks removed)

There are connecting curves between the ring line and the Stadtbahn at Ostkreuz and Westkreuz.

- The south ring curve at Ostkreuz was completely rebuilt between 28 August 2009 and 10 December 2017.
- The north ring curve at Ostkreuz was closed on 28 May 2006 and dismantled.
- A connection between Charlottenburg and Messe Nord/ICC (north ring curve) was used until 1944; after destruction in World War II it was not rebuilt.
- The connecting curve between Charlottenburg and Halensee (south ring curve) was rebuilt in the early 1990s with only one track. Currently, it is used for service traffic and on weekdays by two line S46 services daily.

The Südringspitzkehre spur to Potsdamer Bahnhof was closed in 1944 due to war damage and never rebuilt. Its reconstruction is being considered in the planning options for line S21.

=== Mainline ===
The following long-distance and freight curves connect with the ring line:

- from Berlin-Moabit, for freight from the west, formerly connecting the Hamburger Bahnhof and Lehrter Bahnhof, still used for freight.
- in Wedding/Westhafen since 2006, connecting to the North-South mainline from both directions towards Hauptbahnhof
- in Gesundbrunnen/Schönhauser Allee, connecting from both directions to the Stettin Railway and the northeast
- in Frankfurter Allee/Ostkreuz, from both directions to the Berlin Frankfurter Allee–Berlin-Rummelsburg line to Berlin-Lichtenberg station and Rummelsburg classification yard
- in the Treptow Park area, from the north to the Görlitz line (out of service)
- in Neukölln, from the west to the Görlitz line
- in Hermannstraße, from the east to the Neukölln–Mittenwald line
- in Tempelhof/Südkreuz, a freight rail from the east to Berlin-Marienfelde (out of service)
- in Südkreuz/Schöneberg, a freight rail towards Zehlendorf (out of service)
- in Westkreuz/Halensee, from both directions to the Wetzlar line
- in Westend/Jungfernheide, from both directions to Spandau

== See also ==
- Berlin outer ring
- Circle line (London Underground)
- Koltsevaya Line
- Yamanote Line
- City Circle Line
- Circle MRT line
- Seoul Subway Line 2
