= S85 (Berlin) =

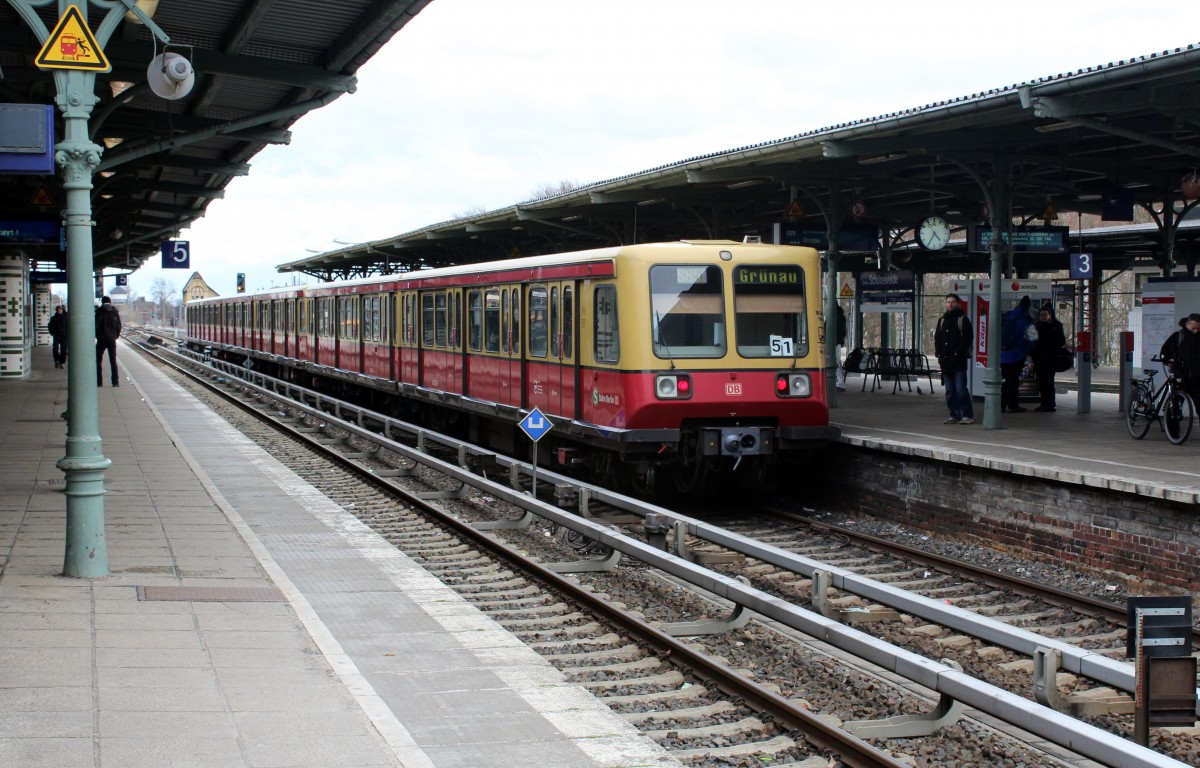

Overview
- Locale: Berlin
- Termini: Flughafen BER; Frohnau/Pankow
- Former connections: Grünau-Frohnau/Pankow

Service
- System: Berlin S-Bahn
- Operator(s): S-Bahn Berlin GmbH
- Rolling stock: DBAG Class 481; DBAG Class 485

Technical
- Electrification: 750 V DC Third rail
Route map
{{Routemap |inline = yes |title = Berlin S85 |title-color = white |title-bg = #66AA22 |navbar = S85 (Berlin S-Bahn) |navbar pos = 2 |map = \\exKINTACCa~~ ~~Flughafen BER~~ \\exACC~~ ~~Waßmannsdorf~~ \\exACC~~ ~~Schönefeld (bei Berlin)~~ \\exSTR+GRZq~~ ~~ ~~Brandenburg–Berlin state border \\exACC~~ ~~Grünbergallee
\\exACC~~ ~~Altglienicke~~

S85 is a line on the Berlin S-Bahn.

The S85 was created on 2 June 1991, replacing the Brown route of the East Berlin S-Bahn between Buch and Spindlersfeld (via the eastern part of the Ringbahn).
