= Sportforum Hohenschönhausen =

German multi-purpose sports complex

Coordinates: 52.5406°N 13.4828°E

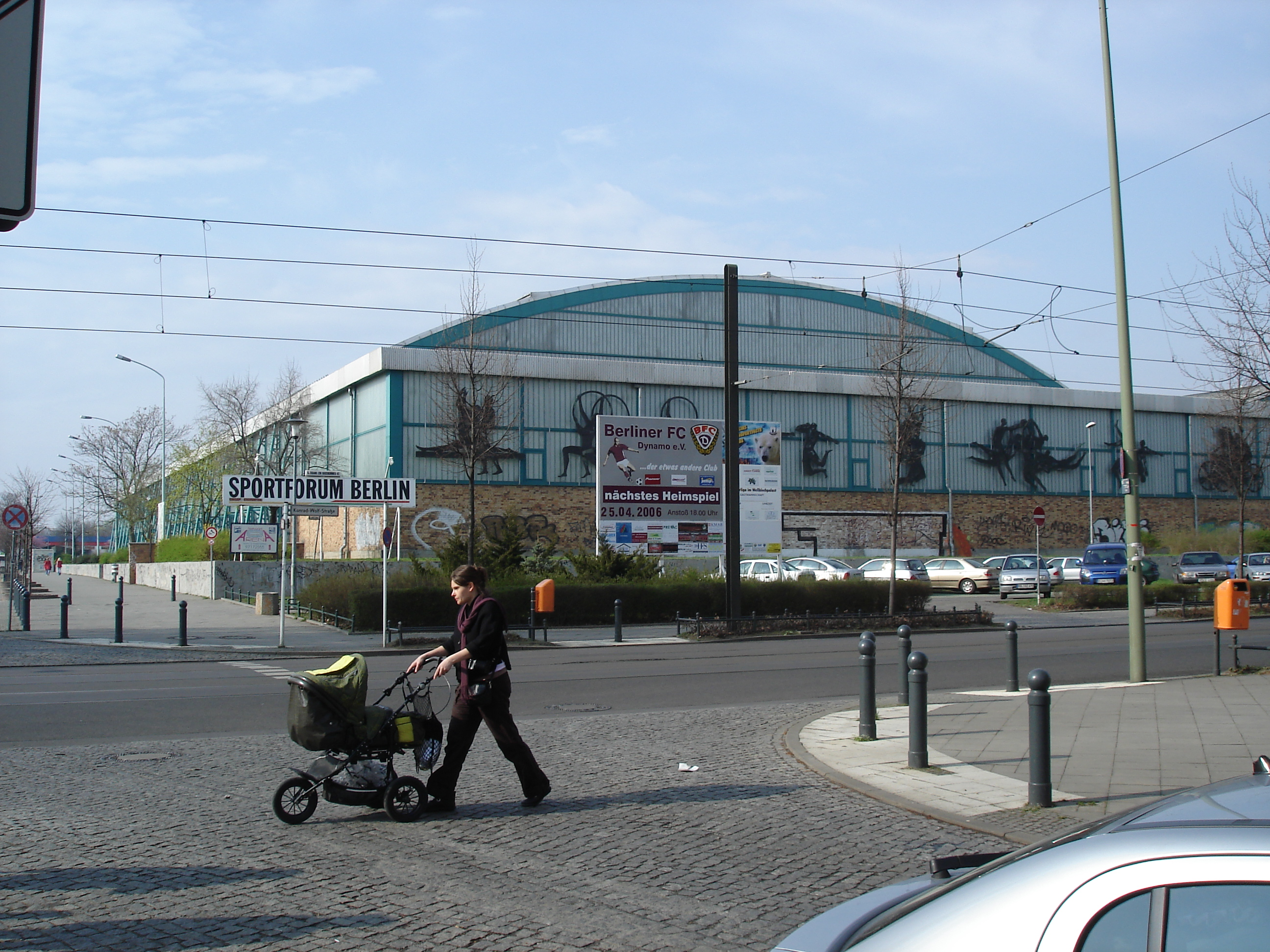
The Sportforum sports halls complex seen from the Konrad-Wolf-Straße in 2006

Sportforum Hohenschönhausen, officially named Sportforum Berlin, is a multi-purpose sports complex in the locality of Alt-Hohenschönhausen of the borough of Lichtenberg in Berlin. The Sportforum was also known as the Dynamo-Sportforum during the East German era.

Sportforum Hohenschönhausen covers an area between 45 and 50 hectares, and comprises 35 sports facilities, including three ice rinks, two athletics halls, a football stadium, as well as eight other halls and open spaces for various sports.

Development of the Dynamo-Sportforum began in 1954. The original building ensemble, which was built in individual sections from 1955 to 1960 based on designs by an architectural collective led by Walter Schmidt, is a protected building of cultural heritage. Expansion of the Sportforum continued into the 1980s. The complex is the second largest sports complex in Berlin after the Olympiapark.

The Dynamo-Sportforum was a training center where top athletes and future Olympic medalists trained during the East German era. It was the headquarter of sports association SV Dynamo and home to sports club SC Dynamo Berlin. The Olympic Training Center Berlin (OSP Berlin) is now the main user of the facilities. Around 20 sports clubs are also based in the Sportforum and more than 3,000 athletes use the facilities every day.

== Location ==
The Sportforum Hohenschönhausen is located in the western part of the locality of Alt-Hohenschönhausen of the borough of Lichtenberg in Berlin. It is bordered on the north by an industrial area (on which, among other establishments, the Berliner-Kindl-Schultheiss-Brauerei is located), on the east by the St. Andrew and St. Mark's Cemetery (German: Friedhof der St. Andreas – und St. Markusgemeinde), on the south by the Konrad-Wolf-Straße and on the west by the Weißenseer Weg.

The Dynamo-Sportforum was originally located in the former borough of Weißensee. The borough of Weißensee was divided in 1985 and a new borough of Hohenschönhausen was formed. The locality of Hohenschönhausen then became part of the new borough of Hohenschönhausen. The borough of Hohenschönhausen was absorbed by the borough of Lichtenberg in 2001 and the locality of Hohenschönhausen became the locality of Alt-Hohenschönhausen at the same time.

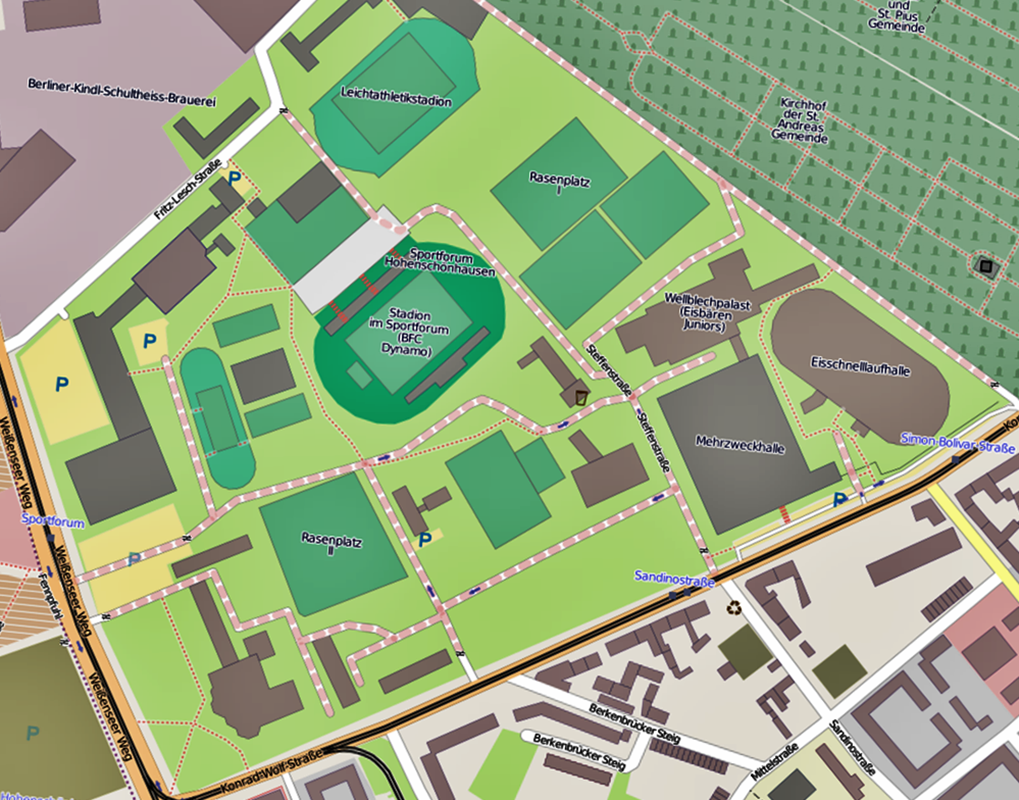
A map of the main part of the Sportforum Hohenschönhausen

== Facilities ==
The Sportforum Hohenschönhausen covers an area between 45 and 50 hectares, and comprises 35 sports facilities, including three ice rinks, two athletics halls, a football stadium, as well as eight other halls and open spaces for athletics, swimming, handball, volleyball, judo, fencing, archery, beach volleyball and football. The Sportforum is the second largest sports complex in Berlin after the Olympiapark.

=== Development ===
In 1952, the Magistrate of East Berlin donated part of today's Sportforum Hohenschönhausen to the Volkspolizei, who built a large football facility for their athletes on the site. At the time, the sports complex only extended up to the Steffenstraße, opposite today's Sandinostraße. Steffenstraße has since been integrated into the sports complex.

In 1953, the Ministry for State Security decided to create a large sports complex in the area. At the same time, the new sports association SV Dynamo was officially founded. SV Dynamo was the new sports association of the Ministry of the Interior and the Ministry for State Security. (Note: SV Dynamo built on the existing structures of the former sports association of the Volkspolizei, the SV Deutsche Volkspolizei.) An architectural competition was held in 1953 for the construction of the new sports complex. The competition was won by an architectural collective led by Walter Schmidt.

Development of the Dynamo-Sportforum began in 1954:

- The former sports field of the Volkspolizei was transformed into a football stadium by raising the ground on both long sides for stands.
- The football stadium was supplemented by a stadium building (German: Stadiongebäude), with sports functional areas, such as office rooms, a conference room and a canteen. The stadium building was completed in 1954. Today, the building houses, among other things, the BFC Dynamo office.
- An athletics stadium with a two-storey boarding school building was created in the north-eastern part of the area. The boarding school building was completed in 1956.
- On the southern edge of the area, on today's Konrad-Wolf-Straße, new sports fields were created on a former cemetery area.
- A temporary wooden building for the construction management was completed in 1957. Today, the building serves as a clubhouse (German: Vereinshaus), with office areas for various users of the sports complex.

The first new major sports facility was the Dynamo-Sporthalle on Weißenseer Weg. The large sports hall was completed in 1958. The Dynamo-Sporthalle was then supplemented with adjoining sports halls for judo, fencing and ball sports to the north. The adjoining sports halls were completed in 1960. Construction was carried out by the state-owned company VEB Industriebau Berlin for the Ministry of the Interior and the Ministry for State Security of East Germany.

The sports complex was then expanded according to requirements by the adding of additional facilities. Expansion continued well into the 1980s:

- An uncovered artificial ice rink was completed in 1958.
- A three-storey sports hotel was completed in the south-western corner of the area in 1962.
- The existing sports fields on the south-eastern corner of the sports complex were transformed into an uncovered speed skating rink in 1962.
- The artificial ice rink was covered by a simple roof and transformed into an ice hockey arena in 1963. The ice hockey arena is today known as the Wellblechpalast.
- A large swimming hall with a 50-meter competition pool with eight lanes was completed in north-western part of the sports complex in 1964.
- An outdoor swimming pool was completed in 1967.
- A new building complex for the Children and Youth Sports School (KSJ) Werner-Seelenbinder was completed in 1968.
- An administration building was completed in 1968. The building was built for the administration of the Sportforum.
- A new speed skating track with a referee tower was completed in 1969.
- The outdoor swimming pool was given a retractable steel roof structure in 1970. The outdoor swimming pool was decommissioned in 1999. The building was transformed into a provisional archery hall in 2001.
- A large sports halls complex on today's Konrad-Wolf-Straße was completed in 1972. The sports halls complex contains, among other things, athletics facilities, gymnastics halls, an ice rink for ice skating, a hall for ball sports, a boxing hall, a ballet hall and three weight rooms.
- A smaller separate sports functional building, today known as the C barracks (German: Baracke C), was built next to the stadium building in the 1970s. The building contains locker rooms and sanitary rooms with toilet facilities and showers.
- The swimming hall was supplemented by the world's first swimming machine in 1976.
- The sports hotel was supplemented by a congress center in the late 1970s. The sports hotel and congress center was structurally completed in 1988.
- The speed skating rink was covered by an indoor building. The building was completed in 1986 as the world's first covered speed skating oval.
- A first airdome was completed west of the large sports halls complex in 1986. The first airdome was replaced 1999. The airdome was then completely renovated in 2017.

The original building ensemble, that was built from 1955 to 1960 to designs by the architectural collective led by Walter Schmidt, is now a protected building of cultural importance.

The sports complex also includes artworks, such as mural and mosaic artworks by Wolfgang Frankenstein in the foyer of the Dynamo-Sporthalle and foyer of the swimming hall, the copper artwork Sport-Fries by Wolfgang Frankenstein on the facade of the large sports halls complex towards the Konrad-Wolf-Straße and the two sculptures Seated Swimmers (German: Sitzende Schwimmerinnen) by Gustav Weidanz and Standing Swimmer (German: Stehende Schwimmerin) by Waldemar Grzimek.

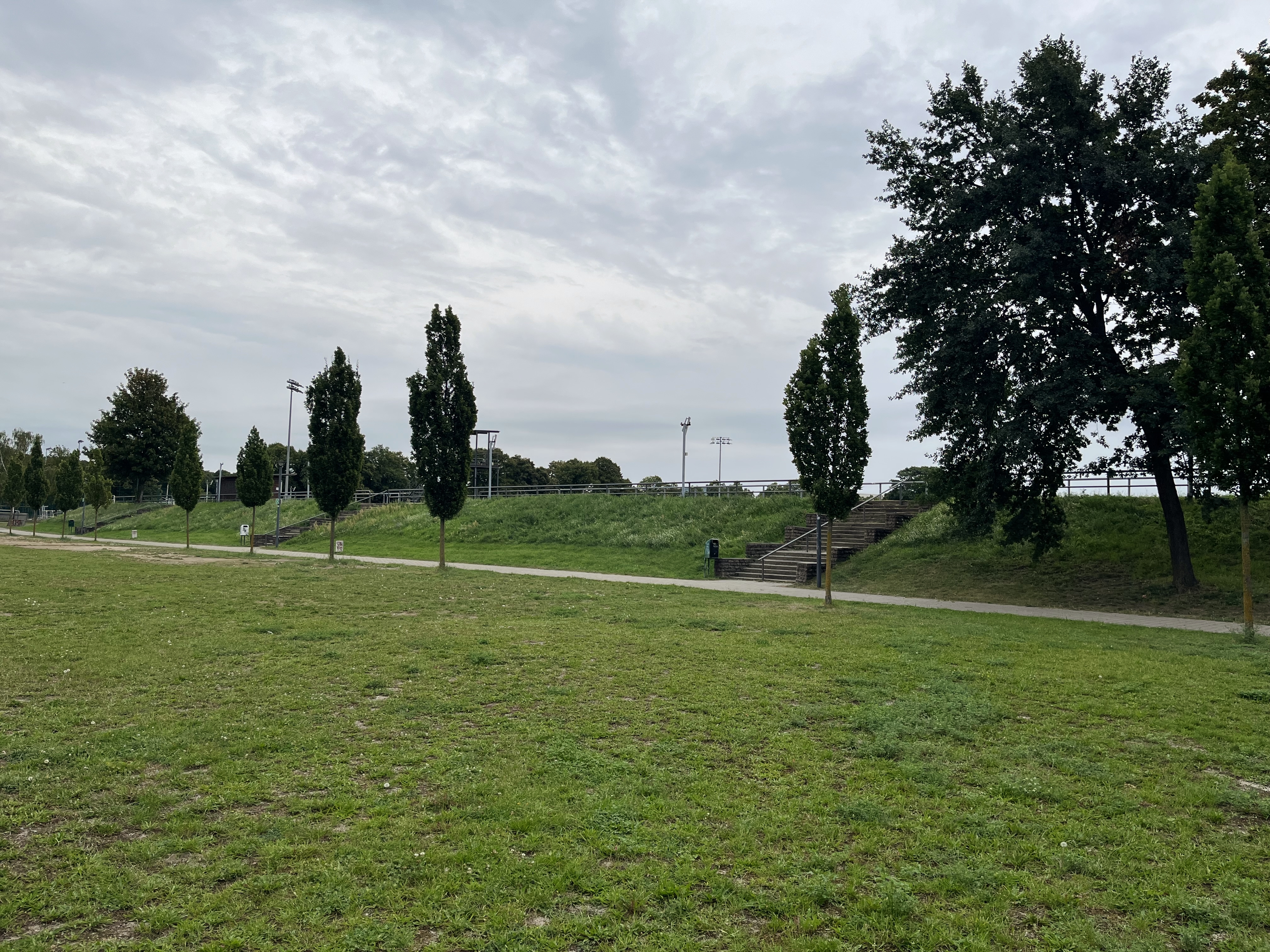
The Stadion im Sportforum seen from the north in 2023

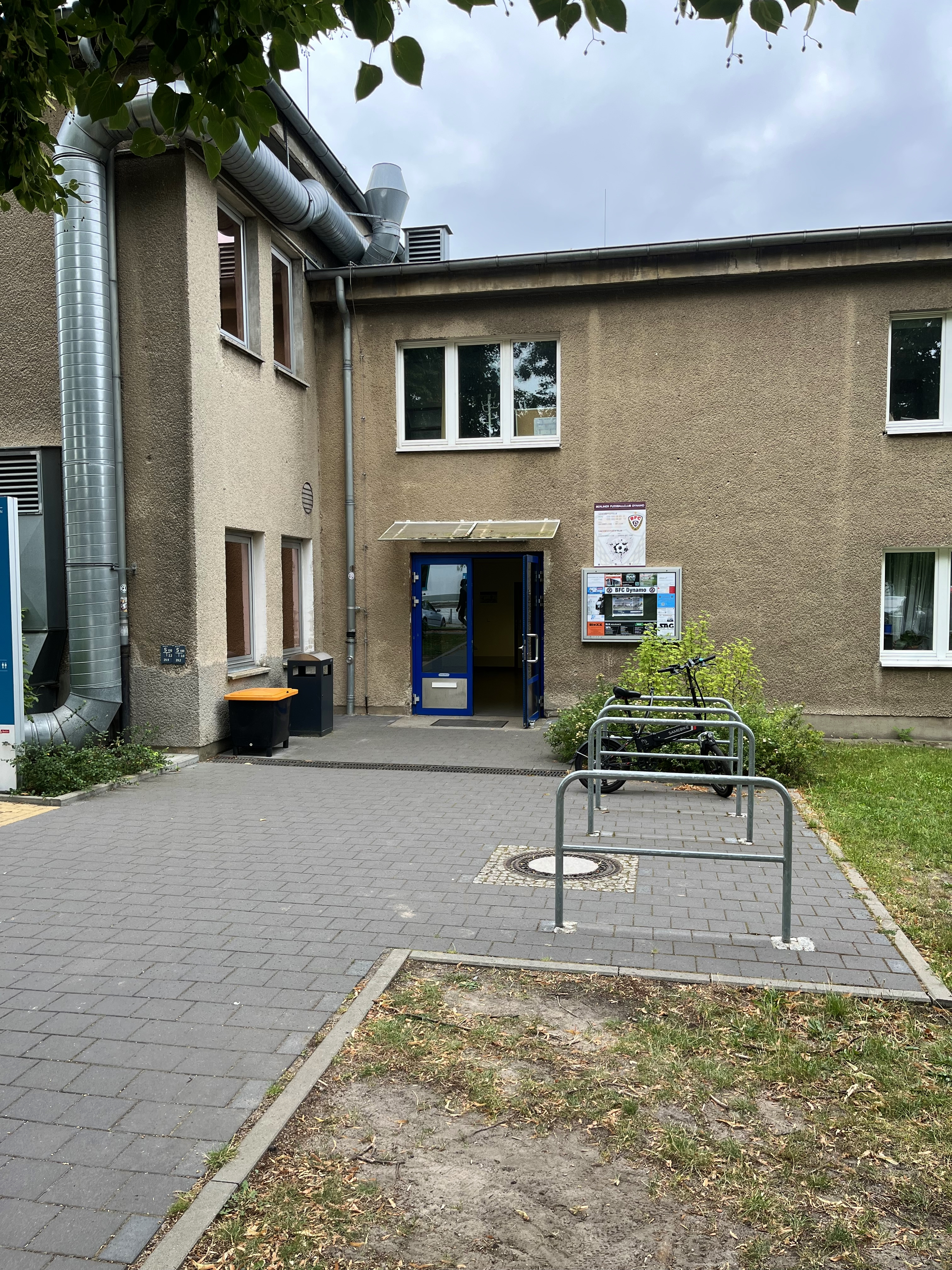
The stadium building with the BFC Dynamo office in 2023

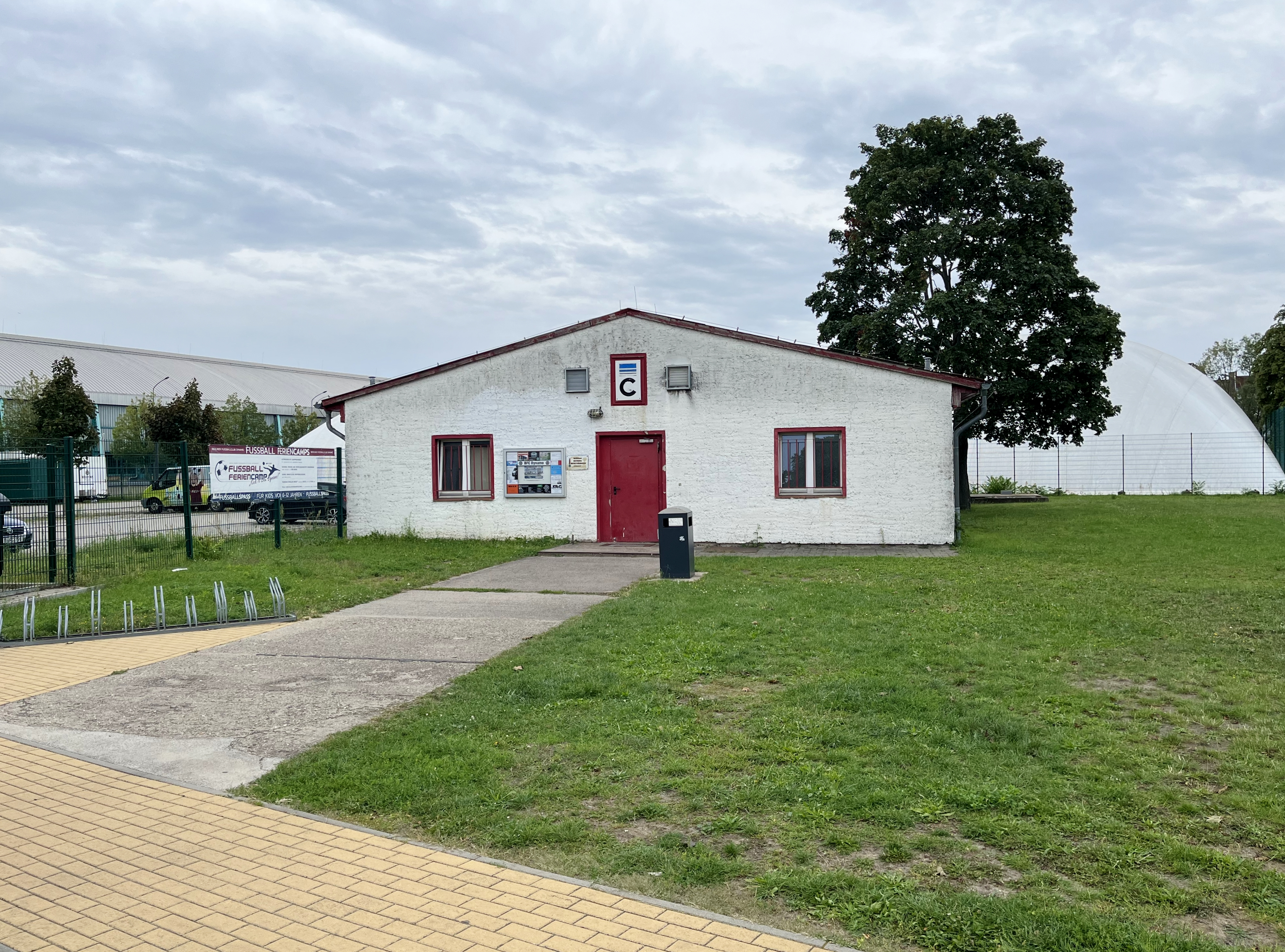
The C barracks, with the airdome in the background, in 2023
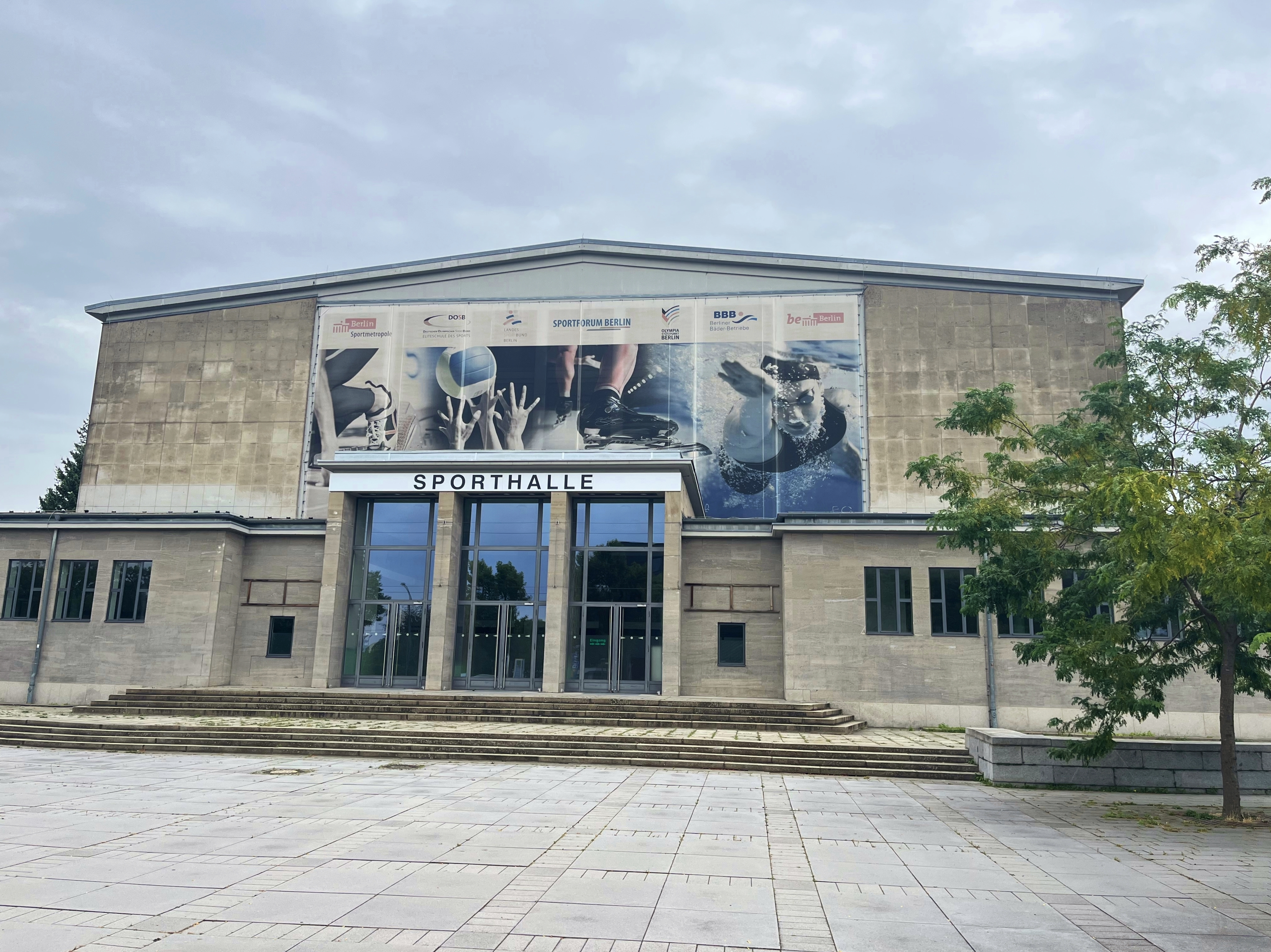
The Dynamo-Sporthalle seen from the Weißenseer Weg in 2023

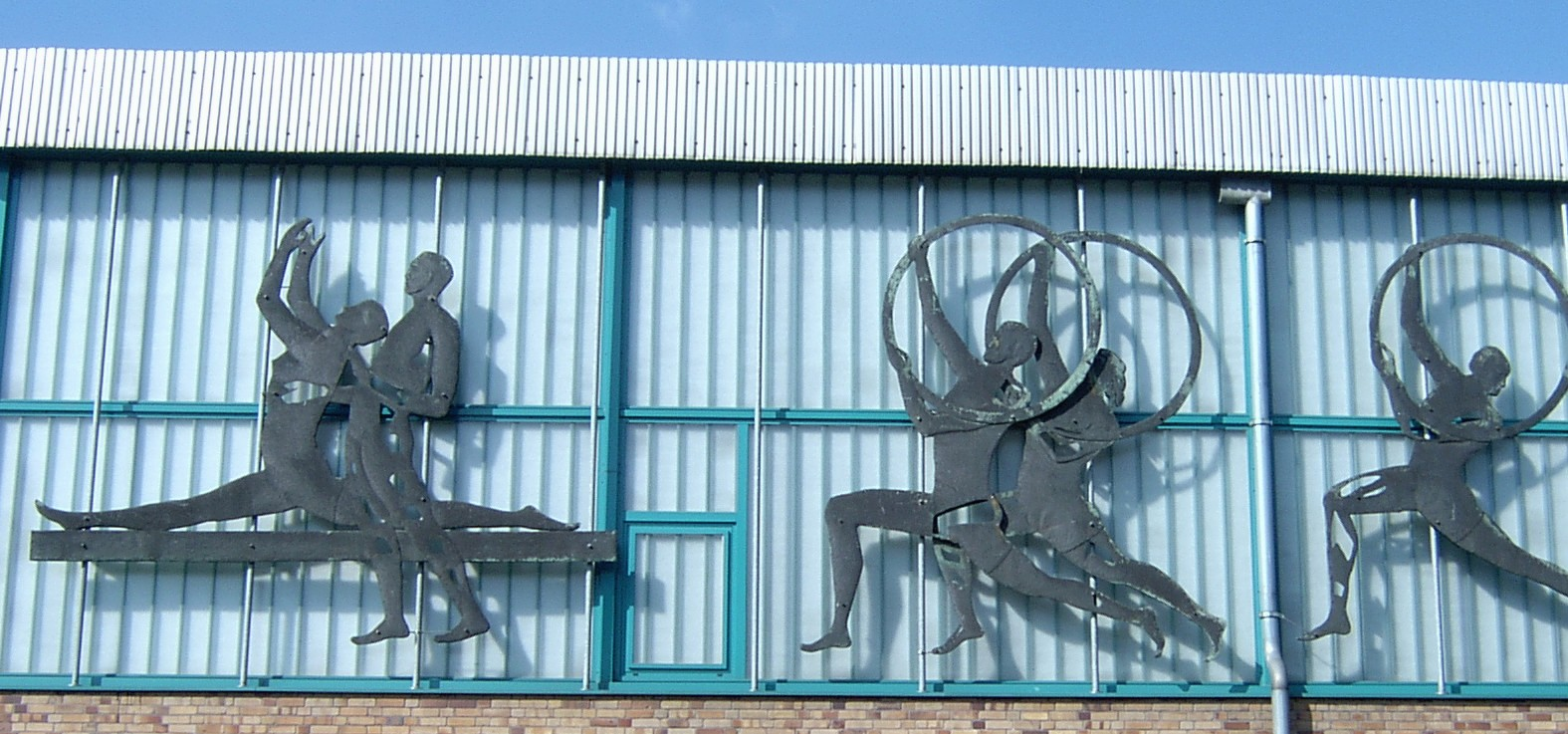
Parts of the copper artwork Sport-Fries at the facade of the large sports halls complex

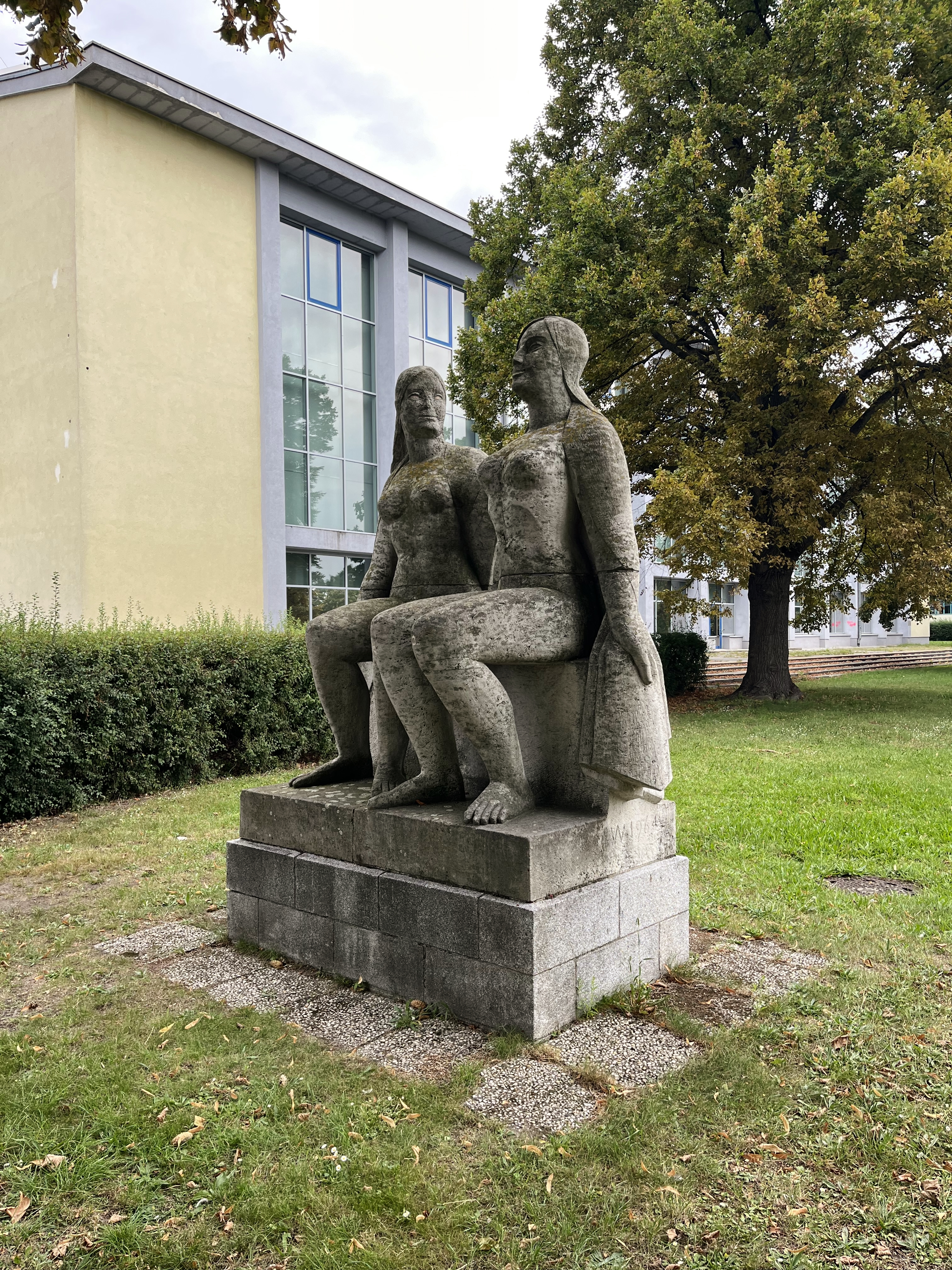
The sculpture Seated Swimmers in front of the swimming hall

== Use of the site ==
The Dynamo-Sportforum was built as a training center for elite sport. It was used by top athletes and future Olympic medalists of East Germany.

The sports club SC Dynamo Berlin, with its many sports, disciplines and squads, was the main user of the sports complex for decades. The Central Management Office (German: Büro der Zentralen Leitung) (BdZL) of the sports association SV Dynamo also had its offices in the Dynamo-Sportforum.

The Olympic Training Center Berlin (OSP Berlin) has used the Sportform since the beginning of the 1990s and is now the main user of the facilities. The former sports medicine building of SV Dynamo in the Sportforum has been the headquarters of the OSP Berlin since 1992. More than 300 national team athletes regularly train in the facility. The OSP Berlin is the largest Olympic training center in Germany.

The Sportforum is home to eleven state training centres. Around 800 Berlin state team athletes regularly train in the facility. The facility also houses the School and High-Performance Sports Center Berlin (SLZB), the "House of Athletes" with around 200 rooms to rent, and the Institute for Sports Science of the Humboldt University of Berlin, with approximately 500 students.

The SLZB sports school in the Sportforum holds a special position in world sports. There is no other school in the world with as many Olympic medals or participation in Olympic Games, World and European championship titles as well as School World Championships as the SZLB. The SLZB was known as the elite Children and Youth Sports School (German: Kinder- und Jugendsportschule) (KJS) "Werner Seelenbinder" during the East German era.

Around 20 sports clubs as based in the Sportforum and more than 3,000 athletes use the facilities every day. The main users among the sports clubs based in the Sportforum are SC Berlin, Berliner TSC, BFC Dynamo, Eisbären Berlin junior teams and Alba Berlin junior teams. Other users are Füchse Berlin, SSG Humboldt zu Berlin, SC Charlottenburg and SV Preußen Berlin.

== Dynamo-Sporthalle ==
The first new major sports facility built in the Dynamo-Sportforum was the Dynamo-Sporthalle on Weißenseer Weg at the western end of the sports complex. The sports hall was built between 1955 and 1958. The Dynamo-Sporthalle was then supplemented with adjoining sports halls for judo, fencing and ball sports in the north. The adjoining sports halls were built between 1957 and 1960.

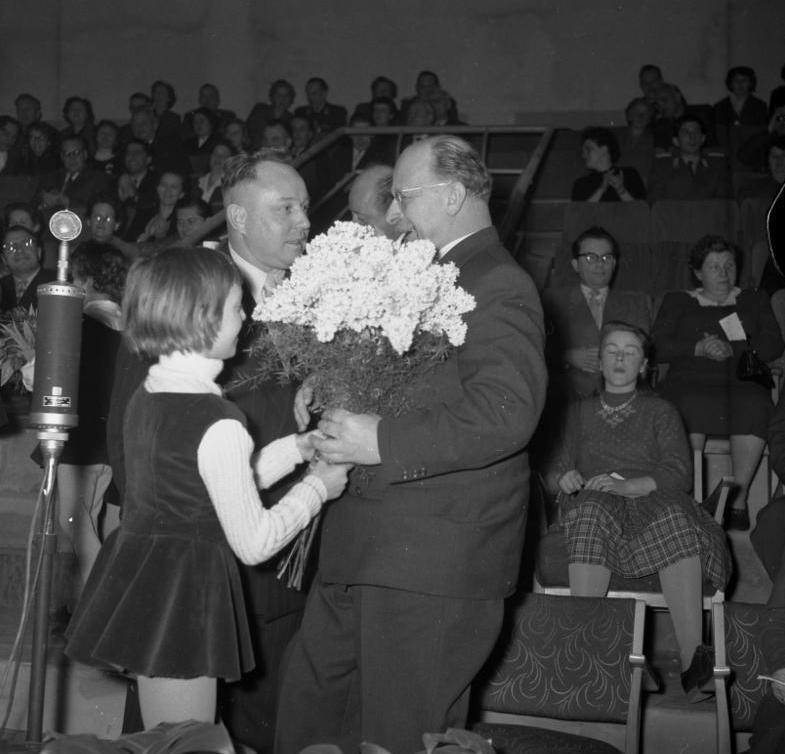
The inauguration of the Dynamo-Sporthalle on 25 January 1958 with the SV Dynamo President Erich Mielke (center) and the SED First Secretary Walter Ulbricht (right)

The Dynamo-Sporthalle and the adjoining sports halls form part of the original building ensemble of the Sportforum Hohenschönhausen. The building complex was erected by the state-owned company VEB Industriebeau Berlin to designs by an architectural collective led by German architect Walter Schmidt. The Dynamo-Sporthalle was also adorned with mural and mosaic artworks by the German artist Wolfgang Frankenstein. The Dynamo-Sporthalle and the adjoining sports halls are today protected buildings of cultural importance.

The Dynamo-Sporthalle has a capacity of between 1,700 and 4,000 spectators depending on the type of event. The large sports hall measures 64 meters in length, 30 meters in width and 15 meters in height inside. Dynamo-Sporthalle therefore allows for several different sports, such as gymnastics, handball, volleyball, judo, boxing, basketball, badminton, table tennis and archery. In the adjoining sports halls, there are further halls for, among other things, volleyball, basketball, judo and fencing, as well as weight lifting rooms and meeting rooms.

The Dynamo-Sporthalle is the home arena for the handball club VC Olympia Berlin. In addition, national and international sports events of the highest class within a number of different sports take place in the hall up to 230 days per year.

The Dynamo-Sporthalle has also been used for other type of events, such as congresses, political mass meetings and balls:

- The first Women's congress of the Democratic Women's League of Germany (DFD) took place in the Dynamo-Sporthalle on 25 June 1964.
- The football club BFC Dynamo regularly held an annual tradition ball each year in the Dynamo-Sporthalle during the East German era. A special event at each tradition ball was the voting of the BFC Dynamo player of the previous year (German: BFC-Fußballer des Jahres). The annual BFC Dynamo tradition ball was a highlight of the year for the sponsoring members of BFC Dynamo and the political VIPs of East Berlin. The event also included prominent guests from the East German cultural scene, such as American singer and actor Dean Reed, who performed during the BFC Dynamo tradition ball in 1979.
- The Dynamo-Sporthalle was also the location for the special party congresses of the Socialist Unity Party (SED) on 8-9 and 16–17 December 1989, when the party decided to rename itself SED-PDS.
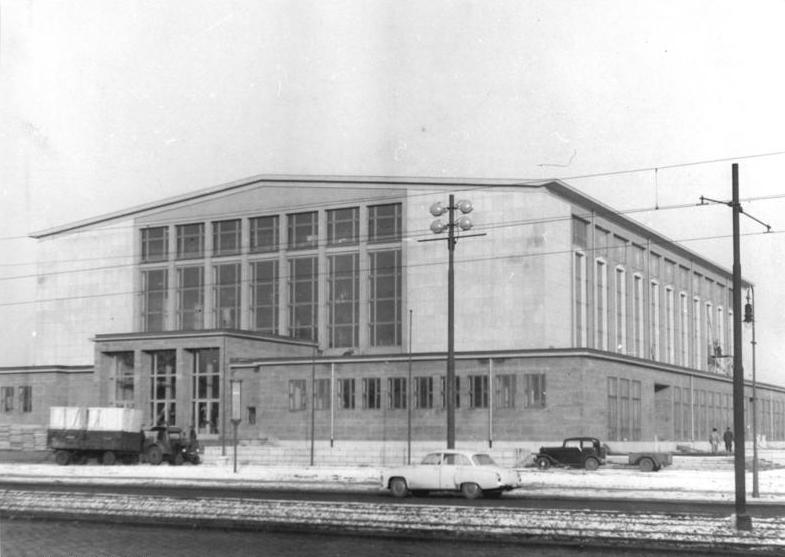
The Dynamo-Sporthalle in 1958

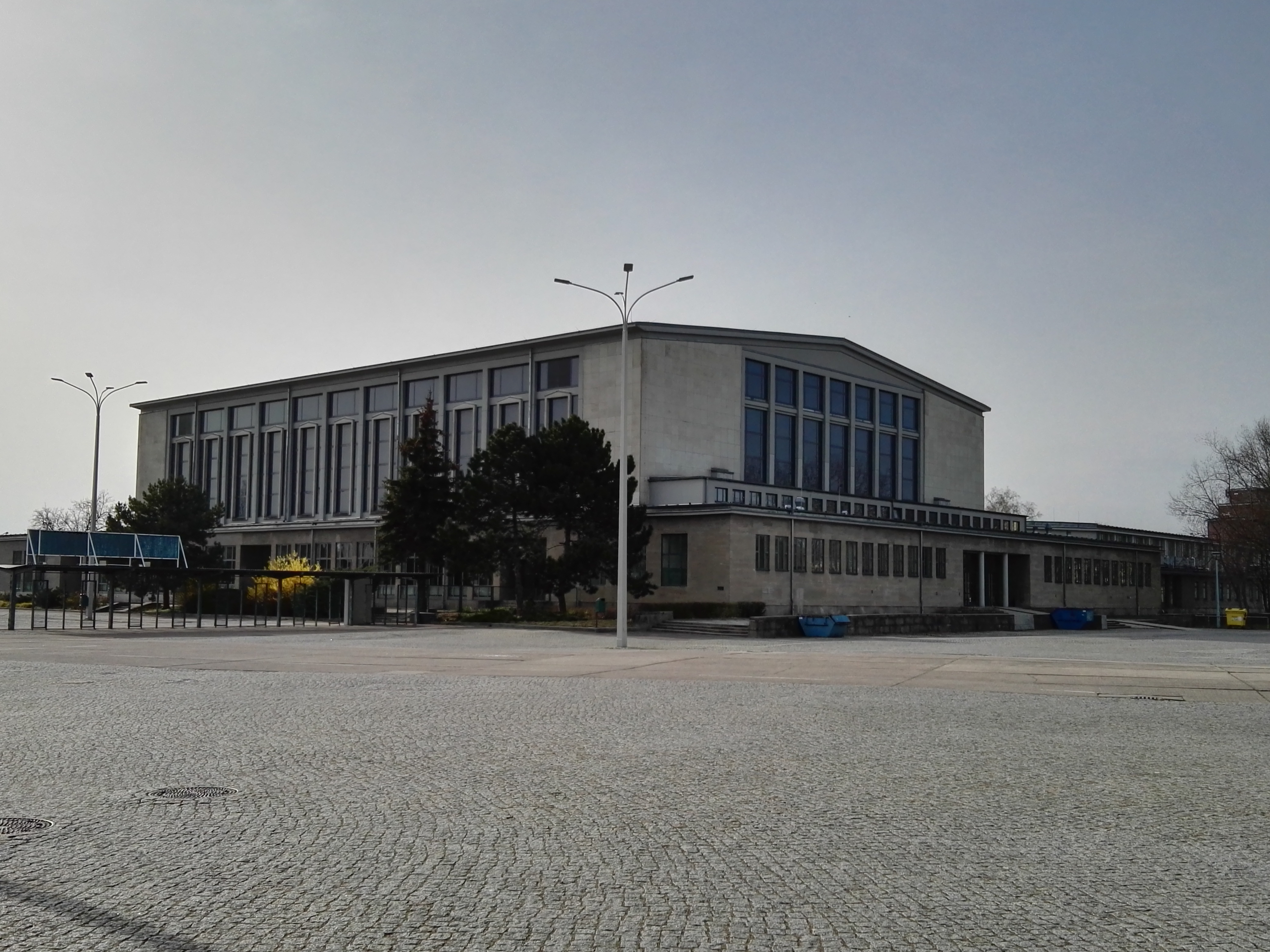
The Dynamo-Sporthalle in 2016

== Ice sports arenas ==
An uncovered articial ice rink was completed in the Dynamo-Sportforum in 1958. The ice rink was then covered with a simple roof and transformed into an ice hockey arena in 1963. (Note: The former SC Dynamo Berlin goaltender Hartmut Nickel skated for the first time on the rink of the Wellblechpalast in 1963. Nickel claims that the roof did not exist at the time, but were added later. Nickel said: "When we played, the lamps were rocked by the wind. And when it was damp, they burst.")

The ice hockey arena came to be known colloquially as "The Corrugated Palace" (German: Wellblechpalast) for its corrugated roof. The name was initially coined by a journalist after Die Wende, but eventually became popular. The stadium was officially named Wellblechpalast in 2001.

The ice hockey arena served as home arena of the ice hockey team of SC Dynamo Berlin during the East German era. The ice hockey department of SC Dynamo Berlin became ice hockey club EHC Dynamo Berlin in 1990. The club was then renamed EHC Eisbären Berlin in 1992. The Wellblechpalast served as the home arena to Eisbären Berlin until 2008.

The ice hockey arena has a capacity for 4,695 spectators, of which 3,112 are standing and 1,357 are seated. The arena is still used as a training facility by the professional team of Eisbären Berlin. It also serves as the home arena of the youth teams of Eisbären Berlin.

An uncovered skating rink was completed in 1962 from existing sports fields on the southeast corner of the Dynamo-Sportforum. The speed skating rink was covered with an indoor hall in 1986. The speed skating indoor arena opened on 17 November 1986, as the first covered speed skating oval in the world, a year prior to the Thialf in Heerenveen.

The speed skating arena has a capacity of 3,966 spectators, of which 1,996 are seated and 1,970 standing. The speed skating oval has a 400 × 11 meters standard track and a smaller 262 × 7 meters training track. The speed skating oval also has an inner 60 × 30 meters ice rink. This smaller ice rink is connected to the entrance building via a tunnel.

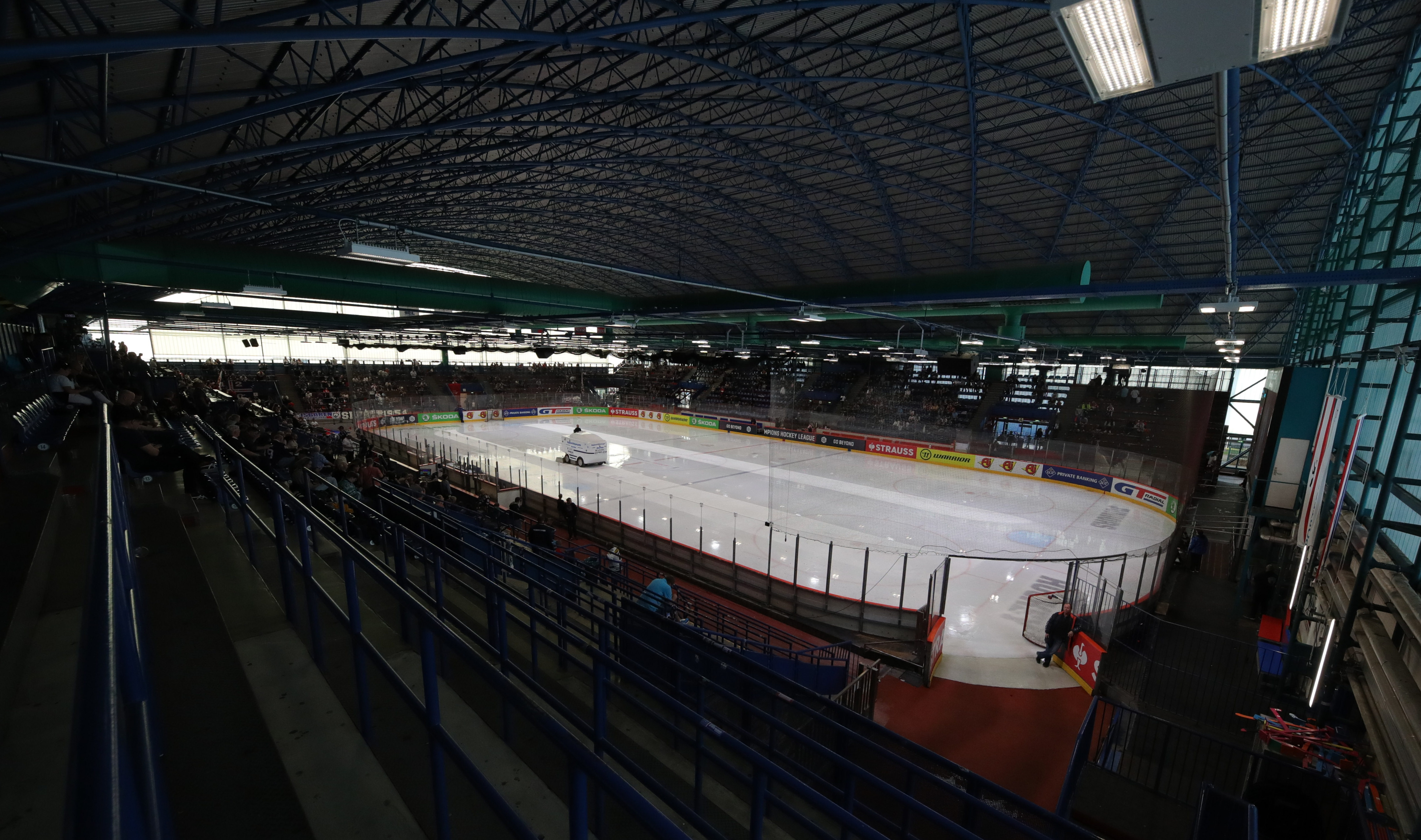
Inside the Wellblechpalast in 2022

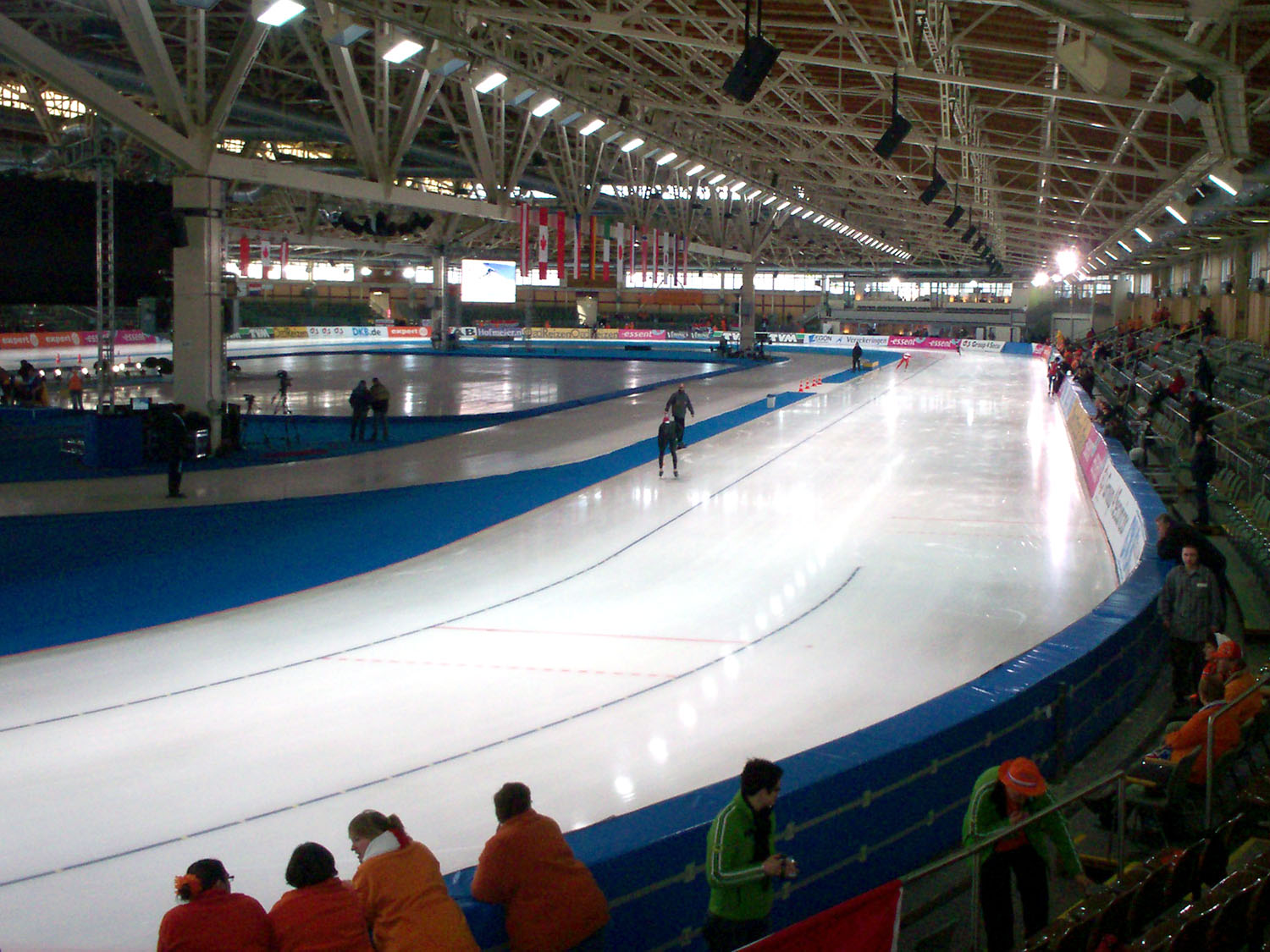
Inside the speed skating oval during 2008–09 ISU Speed Skating World Cup in Berlin in 2008

=== Speed skating track records ===
- 500 m (m): 34.85; Jeremy Wotherspoon, 14 March 2003
- 500 m (w): 37.52; Jenny Wolf, 6 November 2009
- 1000 m (m): 1:08.53; Shani Davis, 6 November 2009
- 1000 m (w): 1:15.04; Christine Nesbitt, 11 March 2012
- 1500 m (m): 1:44.47; Shani Davis, 8 November 2009
- 1500 m (w): 1:54:88; Jorien ter Mors, 8 December 2013
- 3000 m (m): 3:46.17; Håvard Bøkko, 25 October 2008
- 3000 m (w): 4:00.75; Martina Sáblíková, 6 November 2009
- 5000 m (m): 6:09.76; Sven Kramer, 17 November 2006
- 5000 m (w): 6:59.26; Martina Sáblíková, 10 February 2008
- 10000 m (m): 13:09.06; Sven Kramer, 10 February 2008
- Team pursuit (m): 3:40.79; Netherlands, 19 November 2006
- Team pursuit (w): 3:01.03; Canada, 11 March 2012

== Swimming facilities ==
A large swimming hall with a 50-meter competition pool with eight lanes was completed in north-western part of the sports complex in 1964. The swimming hall was then supplemented by an outdoor swimming pool in 1967.

The outdoor swimming pool was given a retractable steel roof structure in 1970. The swimming hall was also supplemented by the world's first swimming machine in 1976. The swimming machine was built in an adjoining building. It was shrouded in mystery and subject to the greatest secrecy during the East German era.

The outdoor swimming pool was decommissioned in 1999. The building was transformed into a provisional archery hall in 2001. Supporters of BFC Dynamo subsequently used the bucket seats that had been left over from the demolition of the outdoor swimming stadium, to replace the dilapidated wooden benches at the football stadium.

The swimming facilities were extensively refurbished in the 2000s. The swimming machine was renovated and brought up to its current high-tech level in 2001, at a cost of 1.75 million Euros. The large swimming hall was also renovated from 2005 and onwards, for a cost of 12–13.5 million Euros. The renovation of the swimming hall was completed in 2007. The swimming hall is now one of the most modern in Europe.

The entire swimming complex covers 4,500 square meters in total.

- The large swimming hall has a 50-meter competition pool with eight lanes, including a diving pool and a 10-meter diving platform, and a grandstand with 1,200 seats. It also comprises a 12.5 × 7.5 meters training pool and a smaller 7 × 5 meters teaching pool. The competition pool has the latest technology for performance diagnostics, including a system for automatically controlling swimming speed above and below water.
- Adjoining buildings comprises a 17.5 × 9 meters special training facility, a 4.50 x 3.80 meters countercurrent pool, and a 2 × 1.50 meters relaxation pool.
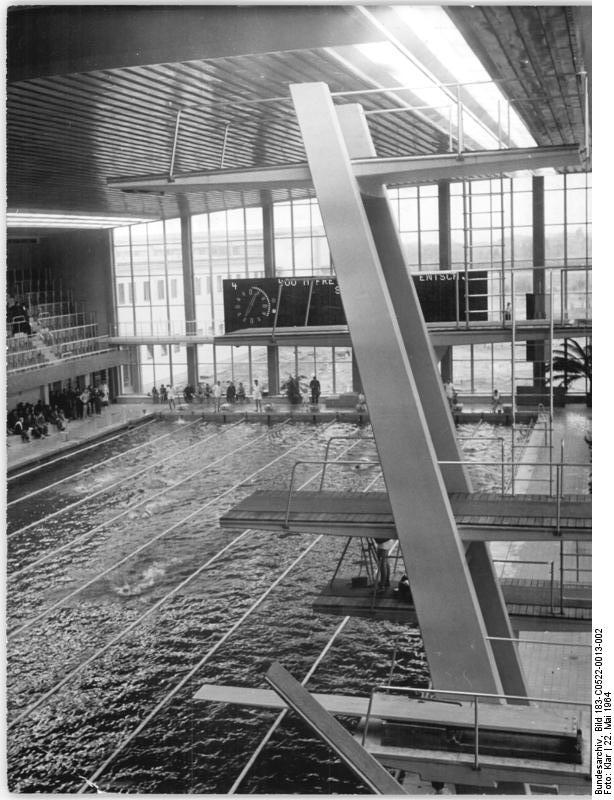
Inside the large swimming hall in 1964

== Football stadium ==
Stadion im Sportforum
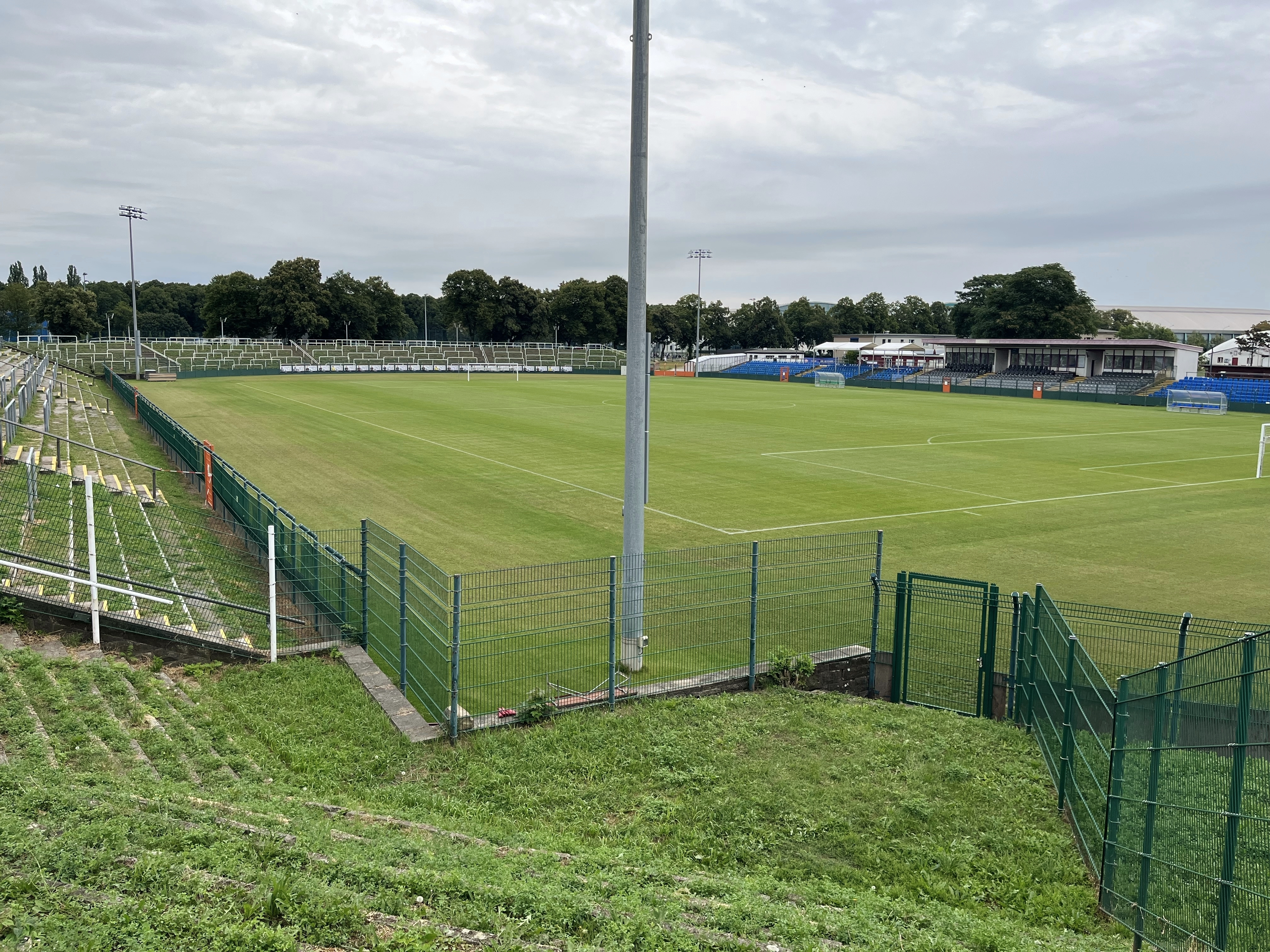
- Stadion im Sportforum in 2023
- Interactive map of Stadion im Sportforum
- Former names: Stadion Steffenstraße; Dynamo-Stadion im Sportforum
- Address: Weißenseer Weg 51-55, 13053 Berlin
- Owner: State of Berlin
- Capacity: 12,000 (Note: Some sources suggest that the capacity is 12,400.); Currently reduced to 4,500 Capacity history: 8,000 (1955–1961); 10,000 (1961–1965); 12,000 (1965–1968); 14,000 (1968–1972); 20,000 (1972–1985); 15,000 (1985–1992); 12,000 (1992–)
- Surface: Grass
- Scoreboard: Manual
- Record attendance: 20,000 (BFC Dynamo–Liverpool F.C., 29 November 1972)
- Field size: 100 x 72
- Public transit: Sportforum (M13), Sandinostraße (M5)

Construction
- Built: 1954–1959
- Renovated: 1975–1976, 2006–2007
- Expanded: 1961, 1965, 1968, 1972
- Cost: 1 million Mark
- Architects: Walter Schmidt and Heinz Scharlipp (1954)
- Builders: Ministry of the Interior and the Ministry for State Security
- General contractor: VEB Industriebau Berlin

Tenants
- BFC Dynamo (1955, 1961–1975, 1986–1987, 1992–2014, 2021–); SG Dynamo Hohenschönhausen (1957–1966)

=== Dynamo-Stadion (1954–1989) ===
A sports field has existed on the site of the current football stadium since the 1920s. The history of the current football stadium then began in the 1950s.

In 1952, the Magistrate of East Berlin donated part of today's Sportforum Hohenschönhausen to the Volkspolizei, who built a large football facility for their athletes on the site. In 1953, the East German Ministry for State Security decided to create a large sports complex in the area. The existing sports field was then converted into a football stadium in 1954, by raising the ground on both long sides for stands. (Note: A centrally located football stadium is depicted in the early plans for the Dynamo-Sportforum by architects Walter Schmidt and Heinz Scharlipp. However, sources vary on the year of the completion of stadium. Some sources suggest that the stadium was completed in 1959. Other sources suggest that the stadium was completed in its current form in 1970. But some sources state that the stadium was built in 1954 and then refurbished in 1973. SC Dynamo Berlin played the short transitional 1955 season during the autumn of 1955 at the stadium. The team drew 8,000 spectators to the stadium for its match against BSG Rotation Babelsberg in the third matchday of the 1955 DDR-Oberliga on 2 October 1955.) The stadium was built with the help of the National Construction Work (German: Nationales Aufbauwerk) (NAW) (de).

SC Dynamo Berlin played the 1954–55 season at the Walter-Ulbricht-Stadion in Mitte. The team moved its home matches to the football stadium in the Dynamo-Sportforum for the short transitional 1955 season. The stadium was also called Stadion Steffenstraße at this time. The capacity of the stadium was 8,000 spectators during the 1955 season. (Note: The facility was still called Sportplatz Steffenstraße at the time. The facility was listed as a second home venue of SC Dynamo Berlin under the name "Sportplatz Steffenstraße" with a capacity of 8,000 spectators at the beginning of the 1956 season.) SC Dynamo Berlin functionary Günther Purrmann praised the Dynamo-Sportforum after the 1955 season, as it offered all facilities for training, such as good changing rooms, a small canteen and a bright room for theory lessons. But above all, the football stadium offered better contact with the crowd, compared to the very large Walter-Ulbricht-Stadion. Nevertheless, SC Dynamo Berlin returned to the Walter-Ulbricht-Stadion for the 1956 season.

SC Dynamo Berlin moved permanently to the Dynamo-Sportforum after the construction of the Berlin Wall began on 13 August 1961. The team played its first match at the football stadium in the Dynamo-Sportforum during the 1961–62 season against BSG Motor Zwickau on the 16th matchday of the 1961–62 DDR-Oberliga on 13 September 1961. The stadium had been expanded since the 1955 season and had a capacity of 10,000 spectators at the start of the 1961–62 season.

The Dynamo-Sportforum was still on the outskirts of Berlin in the early 1960s. The sports complex was surrounded by thousands of small gardens. Hohenschönhausen was primarily known as an excursion destination among Berliners. There was only one tram connection to the Dynamo-Sportforum. During the 1955 season, the transport options to the stadium had been poor. The Dynamo-Stadion im Sportforum was refurbished for the first match of SC Dynamo Berlin at the stadium at the beginning of the 1961–62 season. The stadium was repainted and flowers were planted all around. Transport connections to the stadium were also improved for the 1961–62 season. Special shuttle buses were arranged from the S-Bahn stations Leninallee and Stalinallee, as well as from Antonplatz.

The stadium was gradually expanded during the 1960s. The capacity was 10,000 spectators at the start of the 1965–66 season. The northern end towards the ice hockey arena, which was still open, was closed with a relatively flat earth embankment, except for the entrance, in the autumn of 1965. The capacity of the stadium thus increased to 12,000 spectators. At the same time, the large car park next to the Dynamo-Sporthalle was created and snack bars were established. The capacity was then further expanded to 14,000 spectators in 1968. The stadium had a total capacity of 14,000 spectators at the start of the 1969–70 season, of which 5,000 were seated and 9,000 standing. The clubhouse of BFC Dynamo, the "BFC-Casino", was then opened in the Dynamo-Sportforum in August 1969.

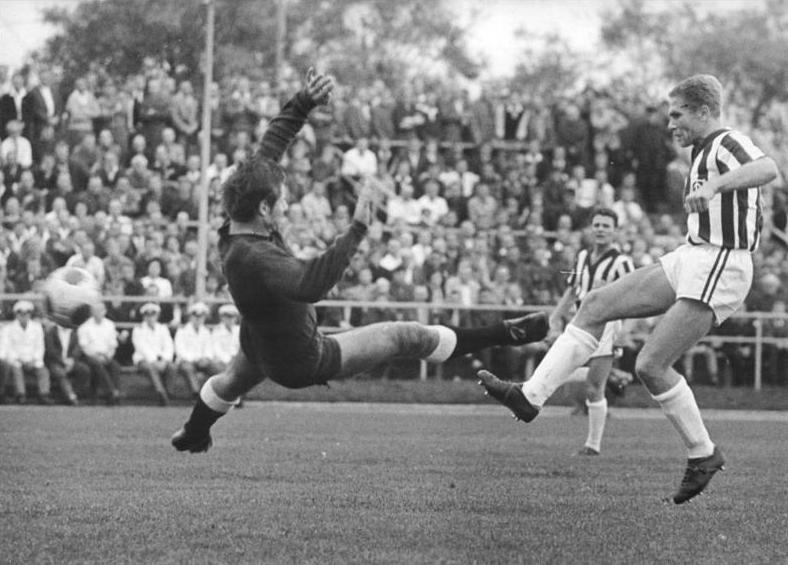
The match between SC Dynamo Berlin and SC Leipzig at the Dynamo-Stadion im Sportforum on 18 September 1965

The team drew average attendances between 3,000 and 6,000 spectators in the DDR-Oberliga at the Dynamo-Stadion im Sportforum in the 1960s. (Note: Average league attendances from the 1961–62 season to the 1968–69 season:) The highlights were matches against local rivals ASK Vorvärts Berlin, and matches against the various top teams during the period, such as SC Empor Rostock, SC Motor Jena and SC Leipzig. In the late 1960s, the matches against local rival 1. FC Union Berlin drew the largest crowds. SC Dynamo Berlin drew 10,000 spectators to its match against SC Empor Rostock in on 25 March 1962, 9,000 spectators to its match against SC Motor Jena on 9 August 1964 and 10,000 spectators to its match against SC Leipzig on 18 September 1965. BFC Dynamo then drew 12,000 spectators to its match against FC Vorwärts Berlin on 26 February 1966 and a whole 13,500 spectators to its match against 1. FC Union Berlin on 3 May 1969.

BFC Dynamo began playing occasional matches that required floodlights at the larger Friedrich-Ludwig-Jahn-Sportpark in Prenzlauer Berg from November 1968. The Friedrich-Ludwig-Jahn-Sportpark was the home ground of FC Vorwärts Berlin at the time. However, the stadium became vacant when FC Vorwärts Berlin was relocated to Frankfurt an der Oder on 31 August 1971. BFC Dynamo played its home matches in the 1971–72 European Cup Winners' Cup and two home matches in the 1971–72 DDR-Oberliga at Friedrich-Ludwig-Jahn-Sportpark during the 1971–72 season. However, more matches at the stadium were not possible after the summer of 1972, as the Friedrich-Ludwig-Jahn-Sportpark was then undergoing extensive renovation for the upcoming 10th World Festival of Youth and Students.

BFC Dynamo finished the 1971–72 DDR-Oberliga as runners-up and qualified for the 1972–73 UEFA Cup. However, neither the Friedrich-Ludwig-Jahn-Sportpark nor the Walter-Ulbricht-Stadion were available for the upcoming UEFA Cup matches. Both were undergoing extensive renovation for the 10th World Festival of Youth and Students. Instead, the Dynamo-Stadion im Sportforum underwent a complete transformation in just five weeks between the end of July 1972 and September 1972. The flat terraces on the side opposite the main stand and on the two curved ends were substantially raised, the exit in the curved end towards the Weißenseer Weg was closed and the old office building at the main stand was demolished. A new 500-seat grandstand and a more spacious 35-metre office building were built at the main stand. Bleechers made of steel pipes were also built on the earth embankments along the long sides. All these measures increased the capacity to 20,000 spectators, of which 7,500 were seated. A total of 6,000 cubic meters of soil was moved for the transformation of the stadium. The redevelopment was made possible, among other things, by numerous voluntary work assignments from Free German Youth (German: Freie Deutsche Jugend) (FDJ) groups and members of SV Dynamo. The current grandstand and office building at the main stand dates from this time.

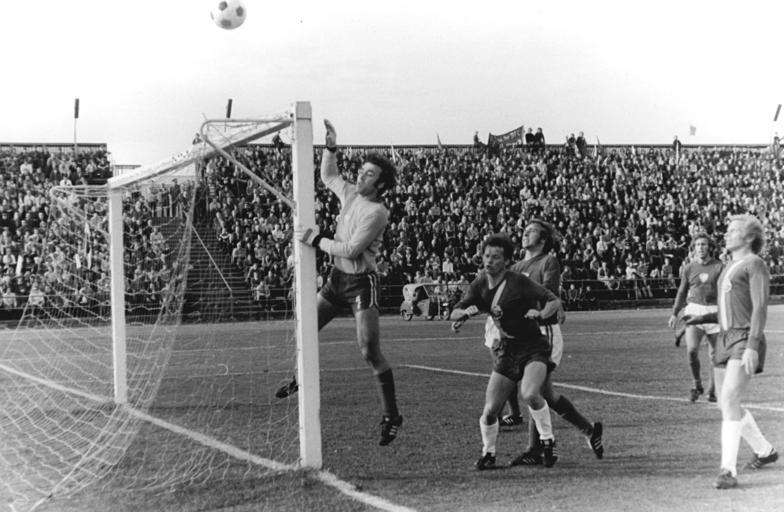
The match between BFC Dynamo and F.C. Hansa Rostock at the stadium on 28 September 1974

BFC Dynamo played all four home matches in the 1972–73 UEFA Cup at the Dynamo-Stadion im Sportforum. The match against Liverpool F.C. in the Round of 16 on 29 November 1972 was attended by 20,000 spectators. The attendance is still a record attendance for the stadium. BFC Dynamo then remained at the Dynamo-Stadion im Sportforum for a couple more seasons. The surroundings around Dynamo-Sportform had now changed dramatically. The ruling Socialist Unity Party (SED) had decided on an housing construction program at the 8th Party Congress in 1971. The construction of the huge residential area Fennpfuhl, which was the first new large building project of its kind, started in the immediate vicinity of the Dynamo-Sportforum at the end of 1972. The Dynamo-Sportforum was soon surrounded by ten-storey prefabricated buildings. Thousands of people now lived in the vicinity of the stadium.

The number of spectators for BFC Dynamo at the Dynamo-Stadion im Sportforum increased in the 1970s. BFC Dynamo drew 14,000 spectators to its match against 1. FC Union Berlin on 26 December 1971, 15,000 spectators to its match against 1. FC Union Berlin on 30 September 1972 and 15,000 spectators to its match against SG Dynamo Dresden on 19 May 1973. An average of 12,000 people attended the last six matches of BFC Dynamo at the stadium in the second half of the 1973–74 season. A whole 19,000 spectators watched the match between BFC Dynamo and 1. FC Magdeburg at the Dynamo-Stadion im Sportforum on 8 March 1975.

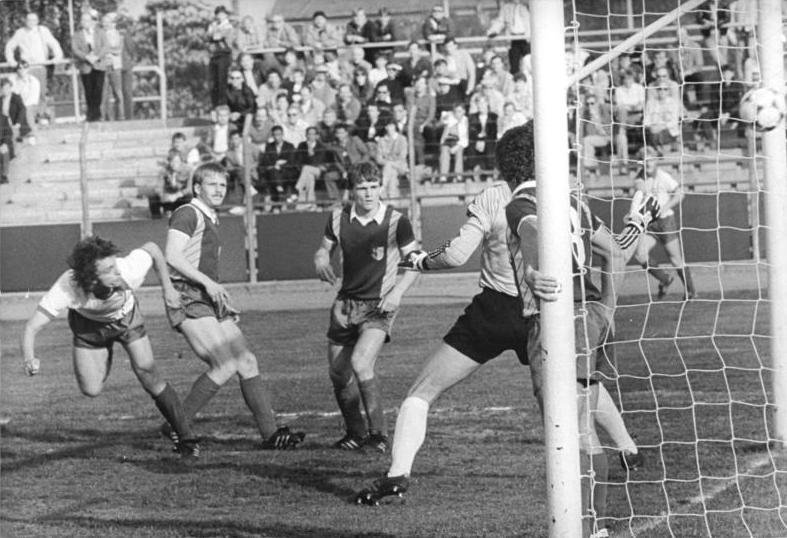
A goal by the BFC Dynamo player Thomas Doll on a header in the match between BFC Dynamo and 1. FC Magdeburg at the stadium on 9 May 1987

BFC Dynamo eventually moved its home matches to the Friedrich-Ludwig-Jahn-Sportpark for the 1975–76 season, due to upcoming repair work at the Dynamo-Stadion im Sportforum. The move was meant to be temporary, but eventually became permanent. (Note: The annual Special edition (German: Sonderausgabe) from Deutsches Sportecho and Die neue Fußballwoche mentioned the Friedrich-Ludwig-Jahn-Sportpark as a stadium of BFC Dynamo for the first time ahead of the 1976–77 season.) The repair work continued also during the 1976–77 season. The Dynamo-Stadion im Sportforum would rarely be used for larger matches from then. The stadium would mainly be used by the reserve team BFC Dynamo II. BFC Dynamo II had played in the second tier DDR-Liga since the 1968–69 season. The team was transferred to the Next Generation Oberliga (German: Nachwuchsoberliga) (de) after the 1975–76 season, but returned to the DDR-Liga in the 1984–85 season under coach Werner Voigt.

The capacity of the Dynamo-Stadion im Sportforum was reduced to 15,000 spectators in 1985. BFC Dynamo returned to the Dynamo-Stadion im Sportforum for the 1986–87 season, as the Friedrich-Ludwig-Jahn-Sportspark was going to be completely redeveloped during the season for the 750th anniversary of Berlin. The steel pipe bleechers on the earth embankments along the long sides had long since disappeared and had not been rebuilt. (Note: The capacity was listed at 14,000 spectators in the annual Special edition from Deutsches Sportecho and Die neue Fußballwoche at the beginning of the 1986–87 season. Also BFC Dynamo II played at the stadium during the season. The edition listed the capacity at 18,000 spectators for BFC Dynamo II.) BFC Dynamo played its 1986–87 European Cup matches against Örgryte IS and Brøndby IF at the stadium. The match against Örgryte IS in the First round on 1 October 1986 was attended by 15,000 spectators at the Dynamo-Stadion im Sportforum. BFC Dynamo then returned to the Friedrich-Ludwig-Jahn-Sportpark for the 1987–88 season.

=== The contemporary stadium (1990–present) ===
BFC Dynamo was renamed FC Berlin on 19 February 1990. FC Berlin moved its home matches to the Stadion im Sportforum for the 1990–91 season. The team played its home matches in the 1990 Intertoto Cup and its first four home matches in the 1990–91 NOFV-Oberliga at the Stadion im Sportforum. However, after the 18-year-old FC Berlin supporter Mike Polley was killed in a riot in Leutzsch during the away match against FC Sachsen Leipzig on 3 November 1990, the team returned to the Friedrich-Ludwig-Jahn-Sportpark, as the larger Friedrich-Ludwig-Jahn-Sportpark could be controlled more easily by the police.

FC Berlin played its historic first match in the DFB-Pokal against SC Freiburg in the first round of the 1991–92 DFB-Pokal on 27 July 1991 at the Stadion im Sportforum, but would remain at the Friedrich-Ludwig-Jahn-Sportpark in the first seasons of the 1990s. However, after two unsuccessful attempts to win promotion to 2. Bundesliga, FC Berlin eventually returned permanently to the Stadion im Sportforum at the beginning of the 1992–93 season. The team would now play in the Sportforum Hohenschönhasen for many seasons to come. The Friedrich-Ludwig-Jahn-Sportpark would then rarely be used by the club in the remaining seasons of the 1990s.

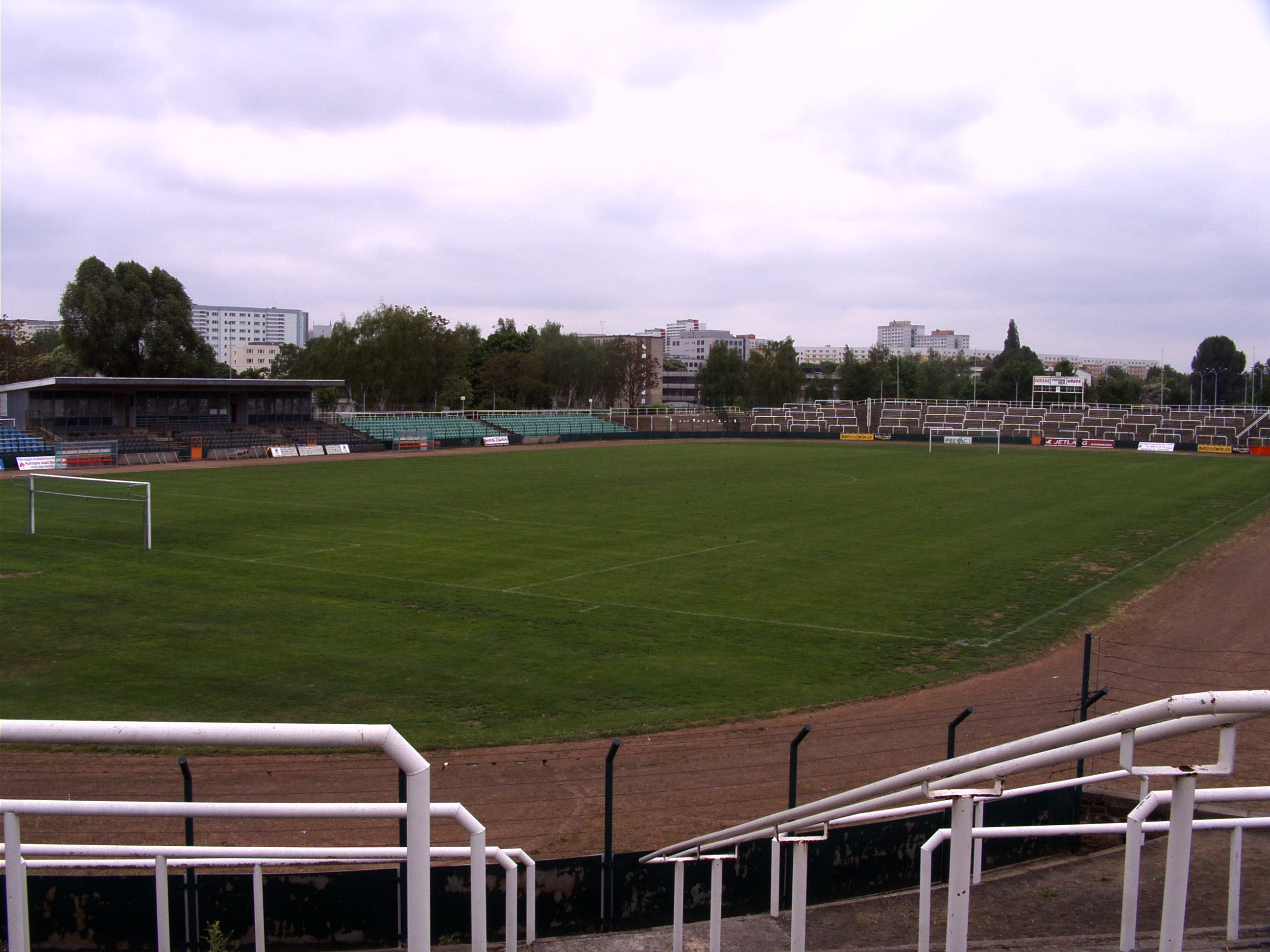
The Stadion im Sportform in 2006

The capacity of the Stadion im Sportforum had been reduced to about 12,000 spectators by 1992. (Note: The capacity was listed at 12,000 spectators, including 4,000 seated and 8,000 standing, in Die neue Fußballwoche already at the beginning of the 1990–91 season.) The team drew just a couple of hundred spectators on average per match at the Stadion im Sportforum in the beginning of the 1990s. The highlights were the matches against 1. FC Union Berlin. FC Berlin drew 2,338 spectators to its match against 1. FC Union Berlin on 24 September 1994 and 2,170 spectators to its match against 1. FC Union Berlin 21 October 1995. FC Berlin under Club President Volkmar Wanski announced plans in April 1998 to buy the stadium from the State of Berlin and modernize the stadium. The plans included the construction of a new covered grandstand and a floodlight system. The club wanted to transform the stadium into a Bundesliga-sized stadium with a capacity of 18,000 seats. However, the plans never materialized.

The team saw slightly rising attendance figures at the Stadion im Sportforum at the end of the 1990s. Active supporters of BFC Dynamo were traditionally found at the northern curved end, popularly known as the "Nordwall" stand. BFC Dynamo drew 4,220 spectators to its match against 1. FC Union Berlin on 23 November 1999 and then a whole 8,258 spectators to its match against 1. FC Magdeburg in the play-offs for the Regionalliga Nord on 27 May 2001. The average attendance for BFC Dynamo in the successful 2000–01 season at the Stadion im Sportforum was the highest since 1990–91 season. However, BFC Dynamo suffered a financial crash after the 2000–01 season. Insolvency proceedings were opened against the club on 1 November 2001.

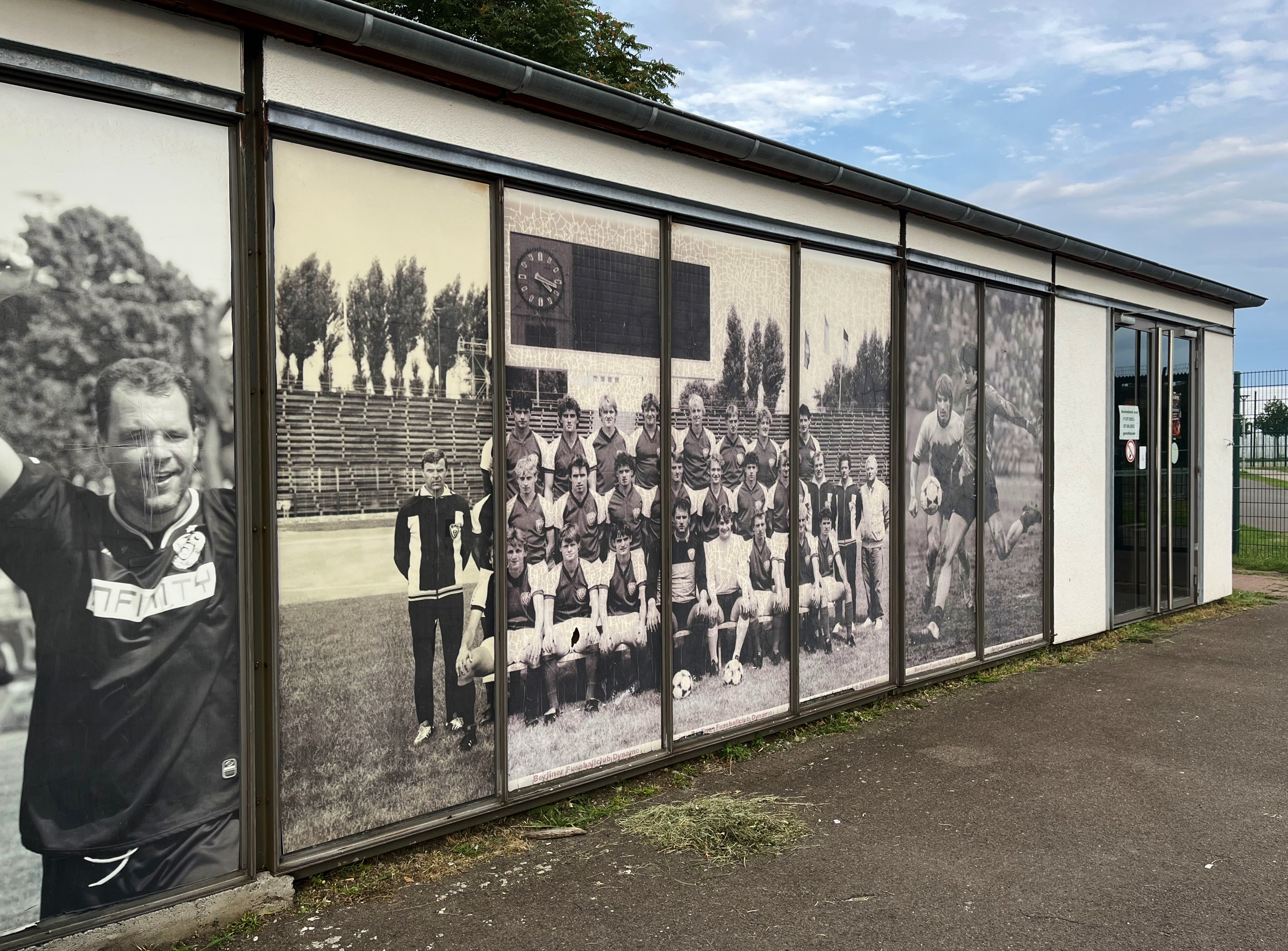
The clubhouse of BFC Dynamo in 2023

Supporters of BFC Dynamo installed new bucket seats on the main stand and built a new clubhouse next to the main stand in 2001–2003. (Note: A former BFC Dynamo supporters page claims that BFC Dynamo supporters replaced the dilapidated wooden benches with modern bucket seats in September 2001.) The bucket seats had been left over from the demolition of the swimming stadium in the Sportforum Hohenschönhausen. The Stadion in Sportforum was then equipped with a 25-metre player tunnel and plexiglass-clad coaching benches in November 2004. BFC Dynamo under Club President Mario Weinkauf announced plans in April 2006 to build a new modern stadium for 10,000–15,000 spectators in the Sportforum Hohenschönhausen. However, these plans did not materialize either.

BFC Dynamo drew 6,647 spectators to the derby against 1. FC Union Berlin at the Stadion im Sportforum on 13 May 2006. The match was abandoned in the second half, when supporters of BFC Dynamo invaded the pitch to storm the away section. As a result of the riots, the stadium was closed for matches in the NOFV-Oberliga Nord at the end of the 2005–06 season. BFC Dynamo thus temporarily had to move to the Friedrich-Ludwig-Jahn-Sportpark. The Stadion in Sportforum was then refurbished during the first half of the 2006–07 season to increase safety. The stadium was not allowed to open until certain requirements from the NOFV had been met. The refurbishment included a new fence. BFC Dynamo returned to the Stadion im Sportforum in the match against SV Germania Schöneiche in the 2006–07 NOFV-Oberliga Nord on 11 November 2006. The main stand was now secured by a modern fence, but the side opposite the main stand (German: der Gegengerade) still remained closed at the time. The team would have to play two more matches at the Friedrich-Ludwig-Jahn-Sportpark in March 2007, in the league matches against Tennis Borussia Berlin on 17 May 2007 and MSV Neuruppin on 31 March 2007.

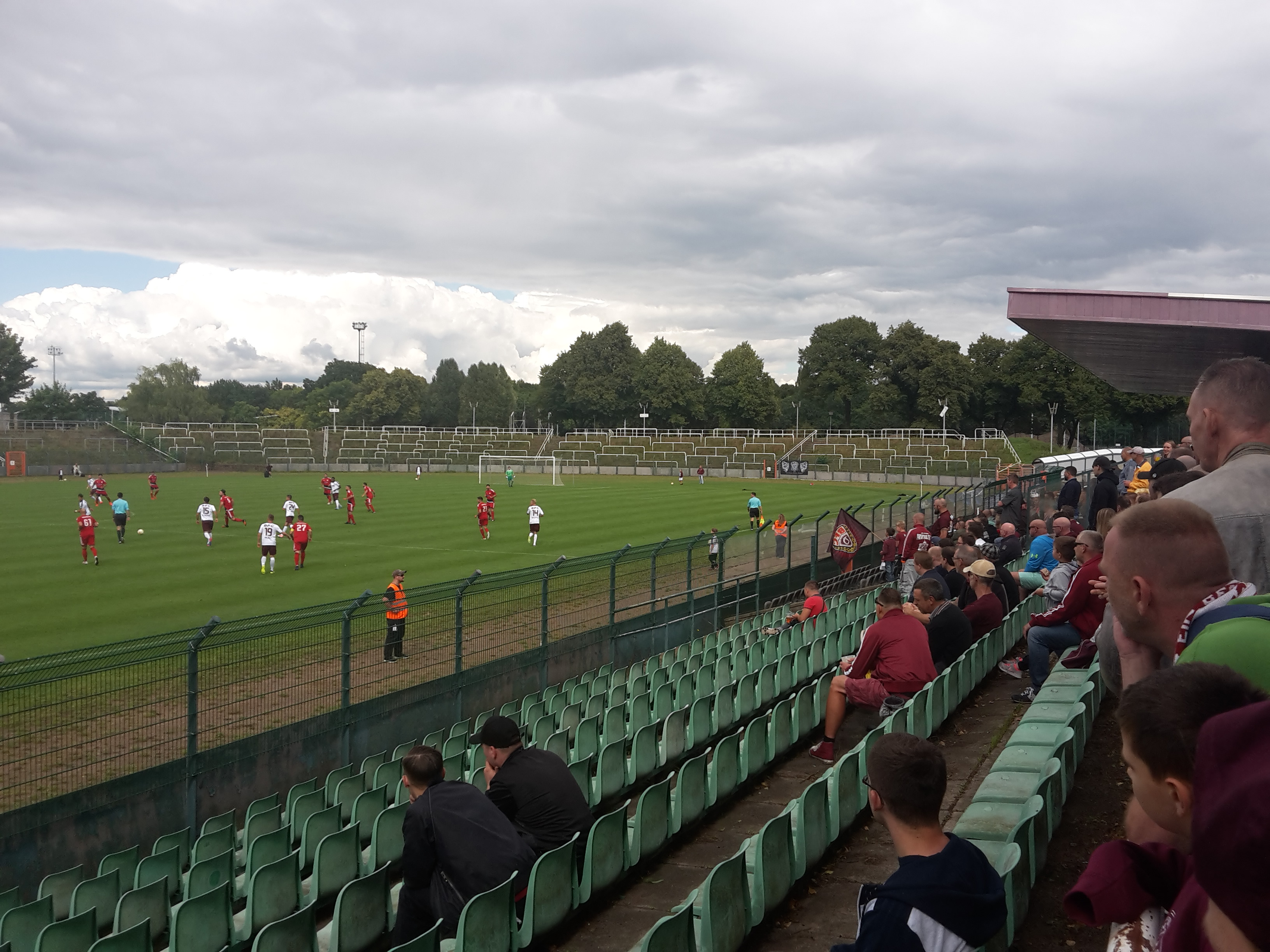
The match between BFC Dynamo and Türkspor FK at the stadium in the first round of the 2017–18 Berlin Cup on 2 September 2017

BFC Dynamo won promotion to the Regionalliga Nordost at the end of the 2013–14 season. The team moved permanently to the Friedrich-Ludwig-Jahn-Sportpark for the 2014–15 season, due to increased media and spectator interest following its promotion. The 2014–15 Regionalliga Nordost meant matches against well-known opponents such as 1. FC Magdeburg and FC Carl Zeiss Jena. The more central location of the Friedrich-Ludwig-Jahn-Sportpark was seen by the club as an opportunity to attract more spectators. However, BFC Dynamo continued to play occasional minor matches at the Stadion im Sportforum, such as minor matches in the Berlin Cup and friendly matches. BFC Dynamo then returned to play two home matches in the Regionalliga Nordost at the Stadion im Sportforum at the end of the 2018–19 season, due to safety issues at the Friedrich-Ludwig-Jahn-Sportpark. The deteriorating state of the floodlights at the Friedrich-Ludwig-Jahn-Sportpark, had resulted in a temporary closure of the stadium. The move to the Stadion im Sportforum was greeted by some supporters of BFC Dynamo as a move to the true home of the club.

BFC Dynamo remained at the Friedrich-Ludwig-Jahn-Sportpark for another season. The large stadium in the Friedrich-Ludwig-Jahn-Sportpark was then planned to be demolished in the autumn of 2020 for a complete redevelopment. However, the demolition was eventually postponed and the operating permit for the stadium was extended until 31 December 2020. BFC Dynamo could therefore continue to play at the Friedrich-Ludwig-Jahn-Sportpark during the first half of the 2020–21 season. The 2020–21 Regionalliga Nordost was eventually suspended due to the COVID-19 pandemic. BFC Dynamo finally officially announced on 21 March 2021 that the club was going to move back to the Sportforum Hohenschönhausen for the next season.

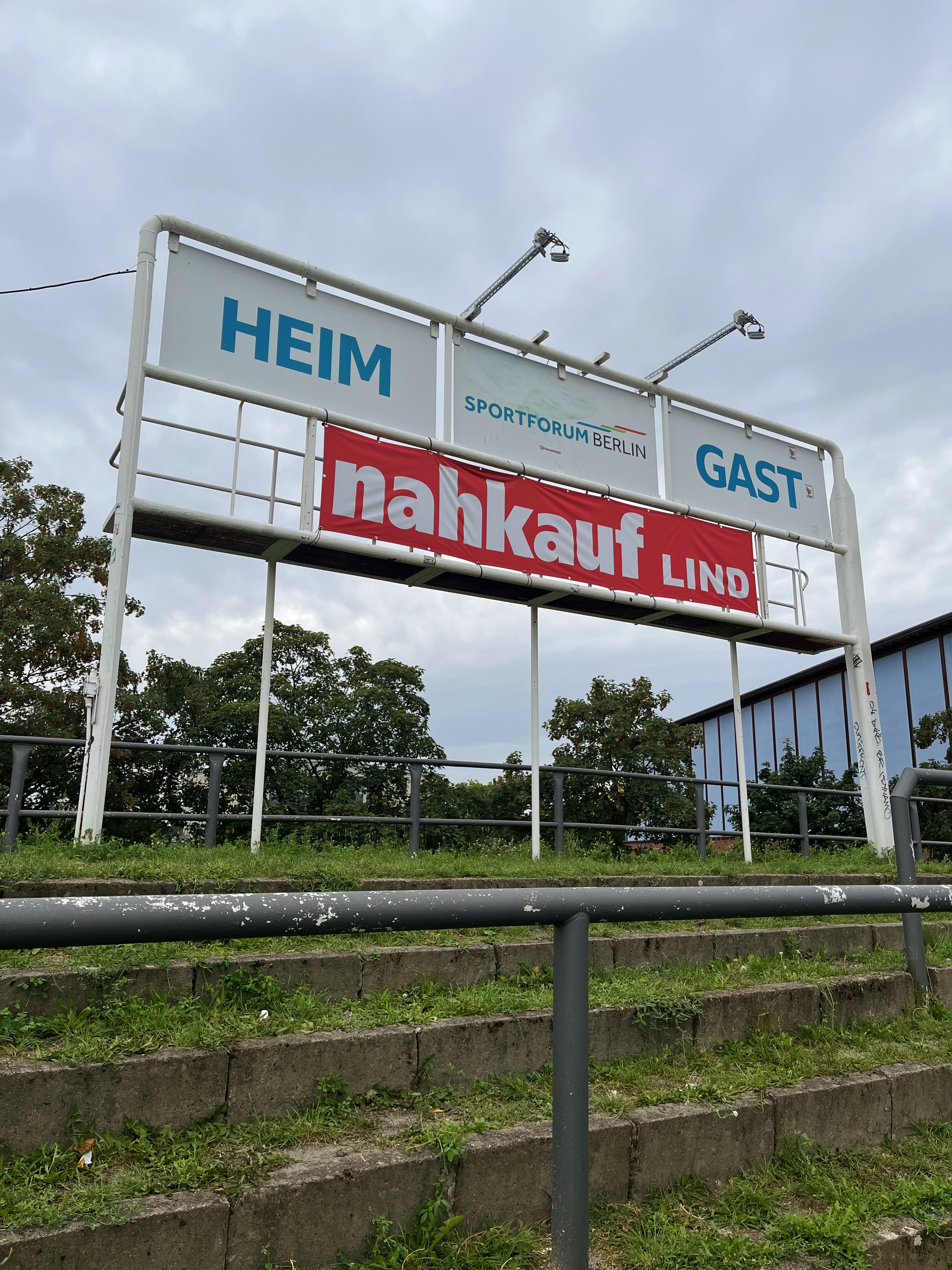
The manual scoreboard at the Stadion im Sportforum in 2023

The Stadion im Sportforum was equipped with a floodlight system in April 2021. The floodlight system installed was the mobile floodlight system that had previously been used at the Friedrich-Ludwig-Jahn-Sportpark as a replacement for the old floodlight system that had been shut down due to its poor structural and technical condition. The mobile floodlight system was no longer needed at the Friedrich-Ludwig-Jahn-Sportpark at the time, as the operating permit for the large stadium had expired. A floodlight system was needed in order for the Stadion im Sportform to meet the requirements from the German Football Association (DFB) for matches in the Regionalliga Nordost.

The Stadion im Sportforum has a total capacity of around 12,000. The total capacity is currently reduced to about 4,500, as of April 2024. The stadium has a seating area on the main stand. The seating capacity is around 2,000 seats, of which 400 are roofed. (Note: One source states that the seating capacity is 1,700 and the standing capacity 10,300.) The stands on the opposite side of the main stand and at the two curved ends are standing areas. Away supporters are located on the southern curved end towards the Weißenseer Weg. The terraces on the stands opposite the main stand and at the two curved ends are filled with gravel and equipped with crush barriers. The stadium has an old manual scoreboard above the southern curved end towards the Weißenseer Weg. BFC Dynamo organized a work effort in the summer of 2021 to get the stadium in shape for the 2021–22 season. Supporters gathered and cleared sections of the old stadium from weeds. Members of the interest group IG BFC'er also restored the iconic manual scoreboard in time for the first home match of 2021–22 Regionalliga Nordost.

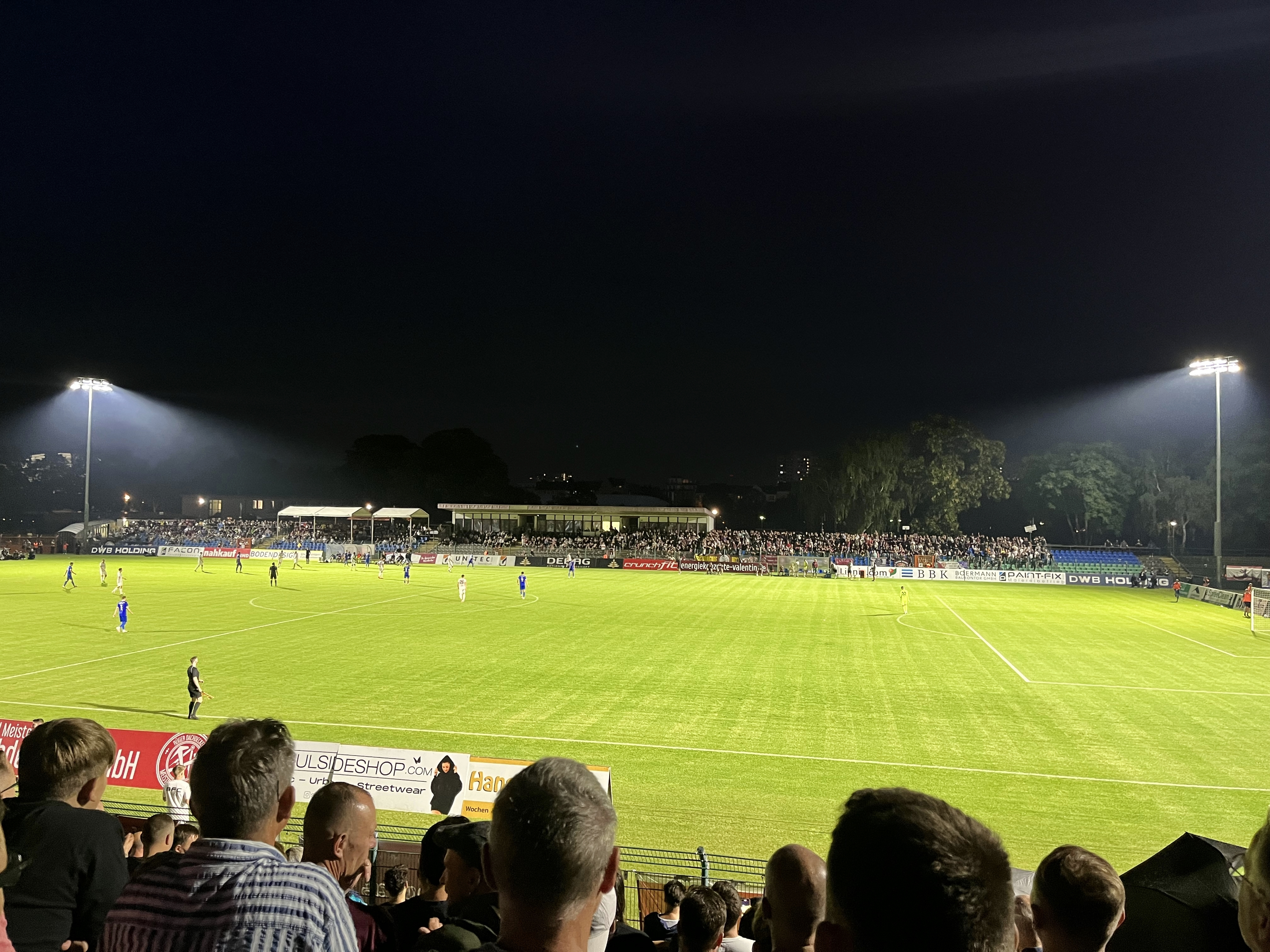
The match between BFC Dynamo and FC Carl Zeiss Jena in the 2023–24 Regionalliga Nordost on 25 August 2023

BFC Dynamo played its first home match at the Stadion im Sportforum in the 2021–22 Regionalliga Nordost against FC Energie Cottbus on 28 July 2021. The match was attended by 2,000 spectators. BFC Dynamo then played its match against VfB Stuttgart in the first round of the 2021–22 DFB-Pokal at the Stadion im Sportforum on 7 August 2021. It was the first match in the DFB-Pokal at the Stadion im Sportforum since FC Berlin played SC Freiburg at the stadium in the 1991–92 DFB-Pokal on 27 July 1991. The stadium was initially only allowed to admit 2,000 spectators for the match, due to the COVID-19 pandemic. However, the day before the match, BFC Dynamo was allowed to sell an additional 1,000 tickets. The match was eventually attended by 2,631 spectators.

The attendance for BFC Dynamo at the Stadion im Sportforum in the 2021–22 Regionalliga Nordost was almost tripled compared to the last comparable league season before the COVID-19 pandemic. The match between BFC Dynamo and FC Carl Zeiss Jena on 10 April 2022 was attended by 3,219 spectators. BFC Dynamo had great success in the 2021–22 Regionalliga Nordost and reached the play-offs for the 3. Liga. The first match of the play-offs was played at the Stadion im Sportforum. The stadium was allowed to admit 5,000 spectators for the match. 4,420 spectators watched the first match of the play-offs for the 3.Liga between BFC Dynamo and VfB Oldenburg at the Stadion im Sportforum on 28 May 2022. (Note: Some media reported an attendance of 5,000 spectators for the match.) In April 2024, BFC Dynamo reported that the club had achieved its highest attendance figures since Die Wende in the Sportforum Hohenschönhausen during the 2023–24 season, thus setting a new attendance record since 1990.

=== Panorama ===
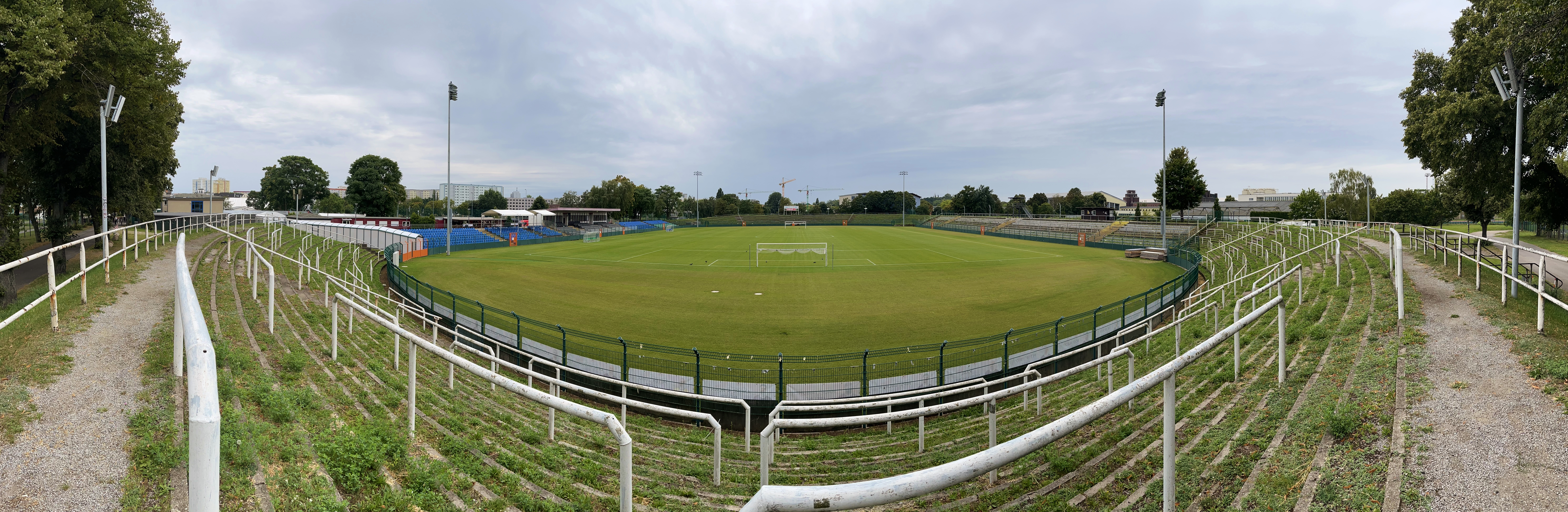
A panorama of the football stadium seen from the northern curved end in 2023

=== The future of the football stadium ===
The Stadion im Sportforum does not meet the requirements of the German Football Association (DFB) for play in the 3. Liga. (Note: Among several requirements, a stadium in the 3. Liga must have a capacity of more than 5,000 spectators, of which at least 2,000 are seated, under-soil heating and an existing floodlight system with an illumination of at least 800 Lux or a new floodlight system with an illumination of at least 1000 Lux, according to the DFB regulations for the 3. Liga as of 2023.) Among other things, the stadium lacks enough seats, under-soil heating and a sufficiently powerful floodlight system.

The Sportforum Hohenschönhausen is planned for a complete redevelopment, which will be carried out in several stages. However, the current football stadium is not included in the plan. The redeveloped Sportforum Hohenschönhausen will be organized around a central facility called "Forum Park". The Forum Park will be located exactly where the current football stadium is now located. The current stadium is thus planned to be demolished. Also the current clubhouse would have to make way for the Forum Park. However, a new, much smaller football stadium is planned to be built on the edge of the sports complex, towards the Konrad-Wolf-Straße. The new smaller stadium was originally planned to hold only 1,000-1,500 spectators.

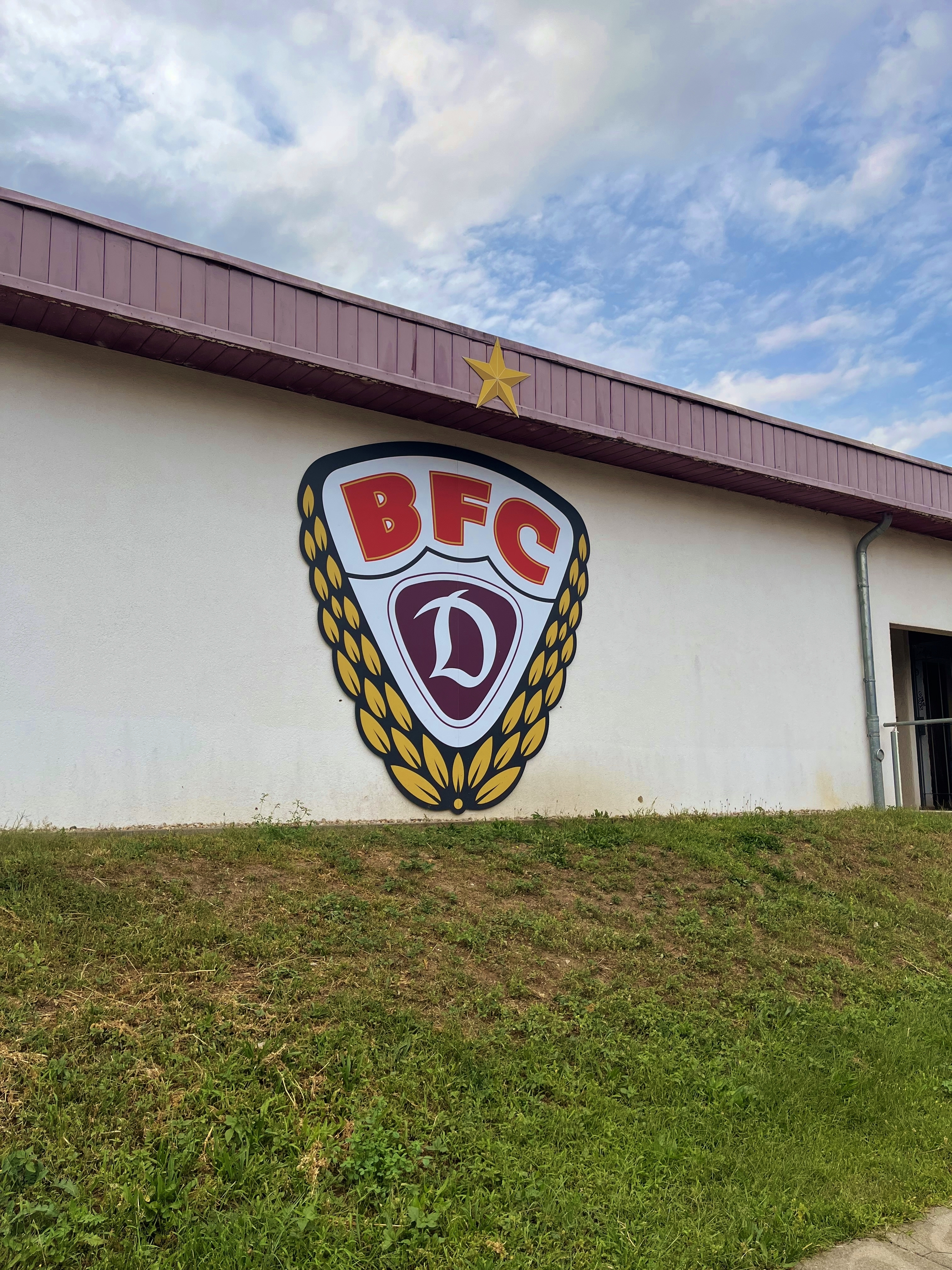
The crest of BFC Dynamo with a championship star at the back of the main stand of the Stadion im Sportforum in 2023

The Sportforum Hohenschönhausen is considered the spiritual home of BFC Dynamo. The sports complex is the location of the club offices and the clubhouse, which serves as a meeting point for supporters and parents. About 24 youth teams of BFC Dynamo, aged from U9 to U19, train regularly at the sports complex. Youth matches takes place in the Sportforum Hohenschönhausen at the weekends. The Stadion im Sportforum stands as the center of club life. Supporters of BFC Dynamo started a petition in February 2022 for the Stadion im Sportforum to be included in the plans for the redevelopment of the Sportforum Hohenschönhausen and for the preservation of the stadium as the center of the sports complex. The petition reached 8,000 signatures by March 2022.

BFC Dynamo stood at first place in the 2021–22 Regionalliga Nordost during the second half of the season and promotion to the 3. Liga was a possibility. The question arose where the team would play its matches in the event of a promotion to the 3. Liga. Discussions began with the Senate of Berlin about whether the Stadion im Sportforum could be adapted to 3. Liga requirements. However, the Senate administration announced that there will not be a 3. Liga-stadium in Lichtenberg. BFC Dynamo initially received some support from The Left faction in the borough of Lichtenberg for a 3. Liga stadium in Lichtenberg. However, The Left emphasized that the Sportforum Hohenschönhausen was a matter for the state of Berlin.

Members of the Lichenberg District council in also asked the Senate of Berlin whether and how the Stadion im Sportforum Sportforum Berlin could be adapted to 3. Liga requirements, so that BFC Dynamo could represent Hohenschönhausen and the city of Berlin in the 3. Liga. The club eventually received support from CDU politician Martin Pätzold, who represents Lichtenberg in the Berlin House of Representatives. Pätzold raised the question of a 3. Liga stadium in Sportforum Hohenschönhausen in the Berlin House of Representatives. The CDU in Lichtenberg also started a survey to ask whether respondents were in favor of BFC Dynamo getting a 3. Liga-stadium in Sportforum Hohenschöhausen.

BFC Dynamo eventually failed in the 2021–22 promotion play-offs for the 3. Liga, but the question of the possibility for the team to continue playing its home matches in the Sportforum Hohenschönhausen is still relevant. The supporters of BFC Dynamo has regularly displayed a banner saying "Sportforum stays" (German: Sportforum bleibt). In 2022, the club also received support from CDU politician Kai Wegner, who was then the opposition leader in the state of Berlin. Wegner visited the club in the Sportforum Hohenschönhausen, together with Martin Pätzold. Pätzold arranged round table talks about the future of the football stadium at the end August 2022. The Sports policy spokesman for the parties SPD, CDU, the Greens and FDP, and the State Secretary for Sport, Nicola Böcker-Giannini participated.

The round table talks did not bring any results for the club. The governing coalition of the SPD, the Greens and The Left wanted to proceed with the current plan for the redevelopment. However, the capacity of the new football stadium, which is planned on the edge of the sports complex, would now be somewhere between 3,000 and 4,000 spectators. However, this capacity is only sufficient for play in the Regionalliga Nordost. BFC Dynamo calculates that it would cost between 4,8 and 10 million Euros to adapt the current Stadion im Sportforum to the 3. Liga requirements. The club is prepared to cover nearly 1 million Euros itself.

A repeat election was held in Berlin on 12 February 2023. Kai Wegner was the top-candidate of the CDU in the election. The CDU eventually won the election and became the biggest party in the state of Berlin for the first time since 1999. Martin Pätzold was re-elected to the Berlin House of Representatives as a direct representative in one of constituencies of Lichtenberg. The CDU also became the biggest party in the Lichtenberg District council. In an interview with Berliner Woche in February 2023, Pätzold talked about the issues for the CDU in Lichtenberg. Pätzold stated that one of the goals must be to give BFC Dynamo a future in the borough by building a stadium suitable for the third tier in Sportforum Hohenschönhausen.

A new coalition between the CDU and the SPD was formed in Berlin after the repeat election. The new coalition presented its coalition agreement on 3 April 2023. The coalition plans to adapt the Stadion im Sportforum to the requirements for the 3. Liga, according to the agreement. The Senate in Berlin was planned to invest a total of 4 million Euros in the stadium.

However, in January 2024, the Senate of Berlin suddenly announced that it had decided on an immediate modernization of the Mommsenstadion in the borough of Charlottenburg-Wilmersdorf in West Berlin instead. The Chairman of the Economic Council of BFC Dynamo Peter Meyer expressed his disappointment publicly, saying: "We have lost." And continued: "I am disappointed at how we were dragged through the ring on a leash and at the same time the Mommsenstadion project is being implemented at record speed." Newspaper Berliner Kurier asked: "Does the motto 'West comes before East' apply here again?". The two main football teams playing at the Mommensenstadion, Tennis Borussia Berlin and SC Charlottenburg, only played at the fifth and sixth tiers respectively at the time, at a significant distance from the 3. Liga. During the match between BFC Dynamo and BSG Chemie Leipzig on 7 February 2024 at the Stadion im Sportforum, a banner in solidarity with BFC Dynamo was displayed by the supporters of BSG Chemie Leipzig. The supporters of BFC Dynamo then displayed a second banner saying: "Easy money flows into Mommsen, the East is ripped off again".

But Martin Pätzlold immediately stated that the goal remained that the football stadium in the Sportforum Hohenschönhausen should be expanded for the 3. Liga and reminded that this was also stated in the coalition agreement between the CDU and the SPD. The money for a feasibility study had already been approved. And the Sports policy spokesman for the CDU in Berlin Stephan Standfuß also assured in an interview with Berliner Zeitung a short time later that the question of a modern stadium in the borough of Lichtenberg would continue to be considered. He added: "I think this may have been misunderstood. Because one does not exclude the other."

The Senate of Berlin commissioned a feasibility studie on a redevelopment of the football stadium in Sportforum Hohenscönhausen in January 2024. The study aims to investigate the feasibility of a multifunctional ball sports stadium, suitable for 3. Liga football, with a capacity for approximately 10,000 spectators, in the Sportforum Hohenschönhausen.

The feasibility study commissioned by the Senate of Berlin eventually proposed building a completely new stadium. The study has estimated the cost of a new stadium at 94 million Euros. The feasibility study concluded that the master plan for the redevelopment of the Sportforum Hohenschönhausen and a renovation of the current stadium cannot be implemented at the same time. The master plan can only be implemented if the existing stadium is demolished and rebuilt. The Senate of Berlin favors the proposal.

== Sports hotel and congress center ==
The Dynamo-Sporthotel was built from 1960 to 1962 as a hotel in three storeys with an attached restaurant. The facility was significantly expanded in the late 1970s with a congress center in two to three storeys. The congress center included conference rooms and a cinema. The sports hotel and congress center was structurally completed in 1988.

The Dynamo-Sporthotel and congress center was made a showcase complex for East German sports. The entire facility contained a hotel with 200 beds, a congress center and a restaurant. The sports hotel and congress center is located in the corner between Weißenseer Weg and Konrad-Wolf-Straße, at the south-western corner of the Sportform Hohenschönhausen.

The Dynamo-Sporthotel and congress center was meant to serve the athletes training at the Dynamo-Sportforum. It was used by athletes such as Franziska van Almsick and Claudia Pechstein of SC Dynamo Berlin. The facility was also used for congresses. The Dynamo-Sporthotel hosted the first joint party congress of the two regional associations of the West and East Berlin CDU in 1990.

The facility became vacant towards the end of the 1990s and eventually fell into disrepair. The buildings has since suffered from vandalism and several fires. The site is awaiting redevelopment and the remains of the sporthotel and congress center is planned to be demolished.

The property was acquired company Immonen Group in 2011. In 2012, the company commissioned the Berlin-based Moritz Group, to develop a project at the site and then sell it to investors. The project was called "The Square 3" and included three high-rise buildings to be built on the site. However, the projekt never materialized.

The sports hotel and congress center was supposed to be demolished in 2015. However, the demolition never took place. A new hotel was planned to be built on the site as of 2020. However, these plans did not materialize either. In 2022, The Left faction of the Lichtenberg District council proposed instead to expand the sports areas of the Sportforum Hohenschönhausen to include the area of the sports hotel and congress center, as part of the major modernization plans for the Sportforum Hohenschönhausen.

Eventually, the property got new owners in 2023 and new plans has been made. The new owner plans build residential buildings on the site, as of 2024. The sports hotel and congress center, similar to the Sports and recreation centre (German: Sport- und Erholungszentrum) (SEZ) on Landsberger Allee, from the 1980s, is not classified as a building of cultural heritage, and the borough of Lichtenberg is currently not planning to apply for such protection, as of January 2024. However, any new plans must take the "environmental protection" of the entire "Weißenseer Weg 53" complex into account.

The Berliner Zeitung reported in October 2024 that the sports hotel and congress center is now going to be demolished. Company DLE Land Development GmbH is now planning to build a new residential quarter with up to 600 apartments at the site. Construction is planned to be carried out in five phases from 2025.

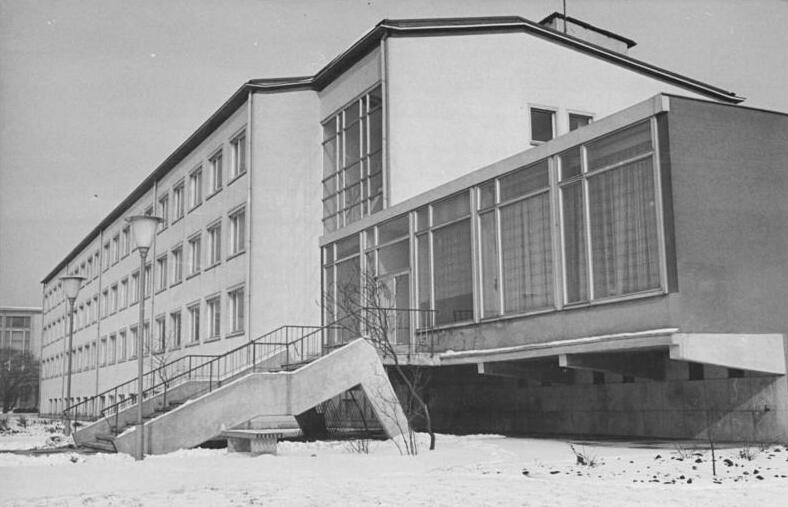
The Dynamo-Sporthotel in 1964

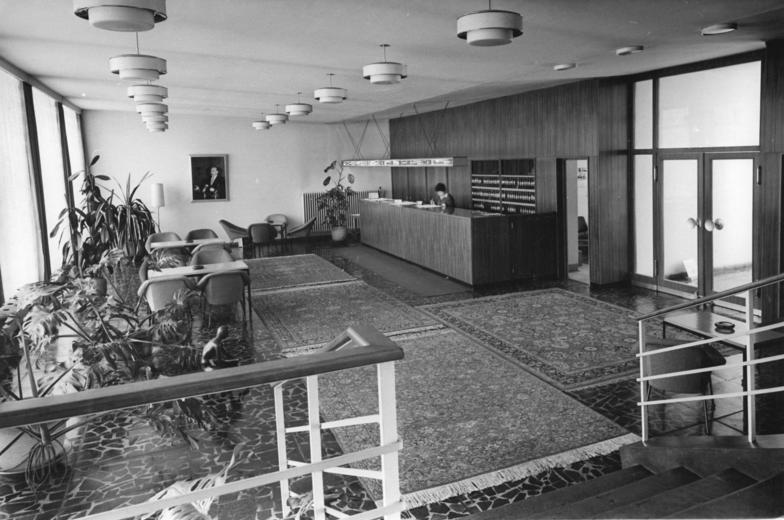
The foyer of the Dynamo-Sporthotel in 1964

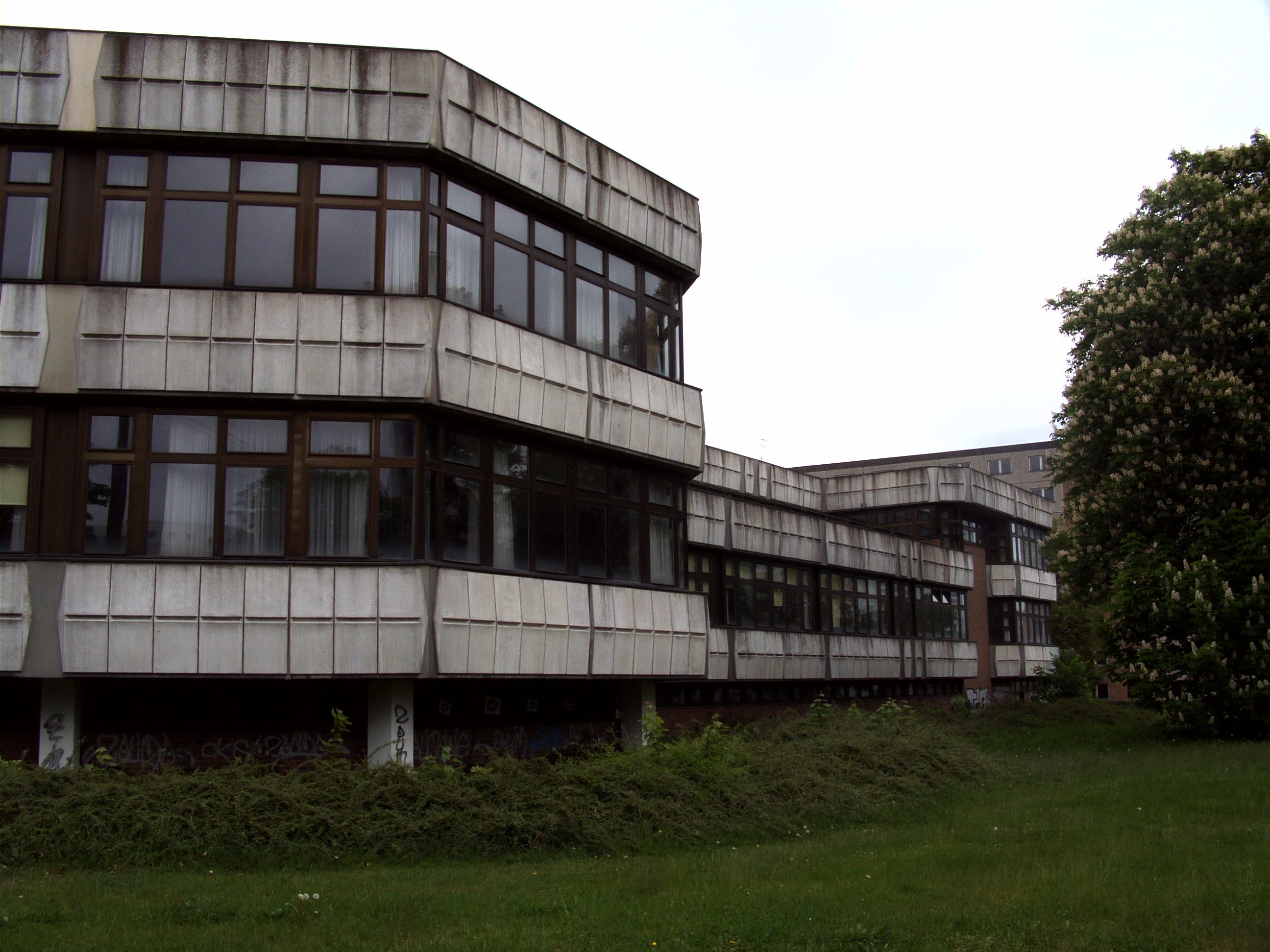
The ruins of the Congress center in 2006

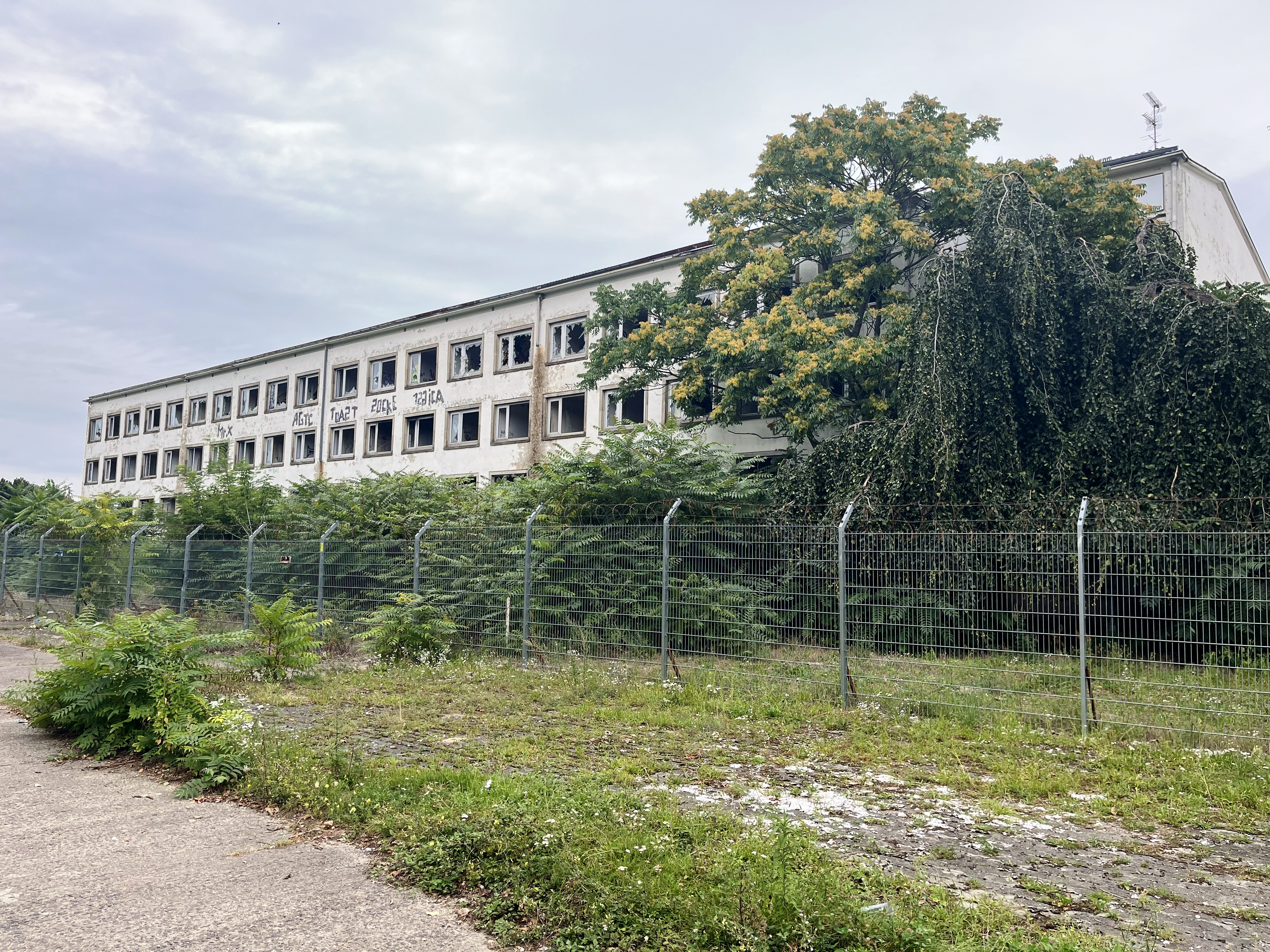
The ruins of the Dynamo-Sporthotel in 2023

== Historical gallery ==
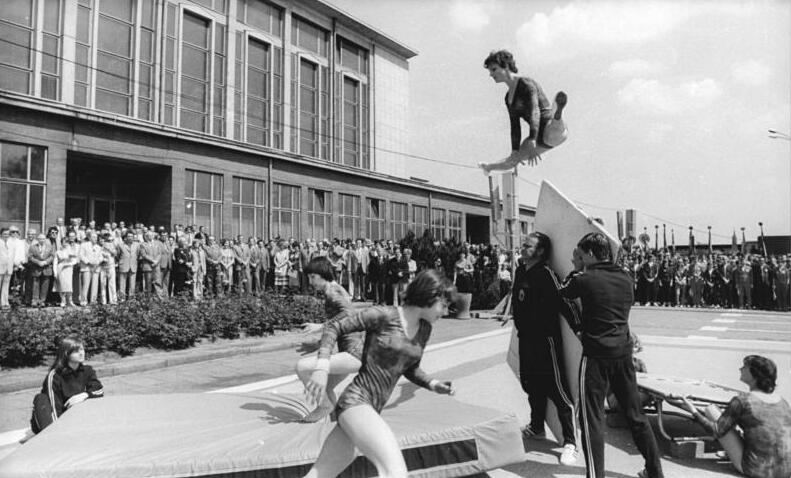
A performance during the DTSB Athletics- and Sports day in front of the Dynamo-Sporthalle in 1958

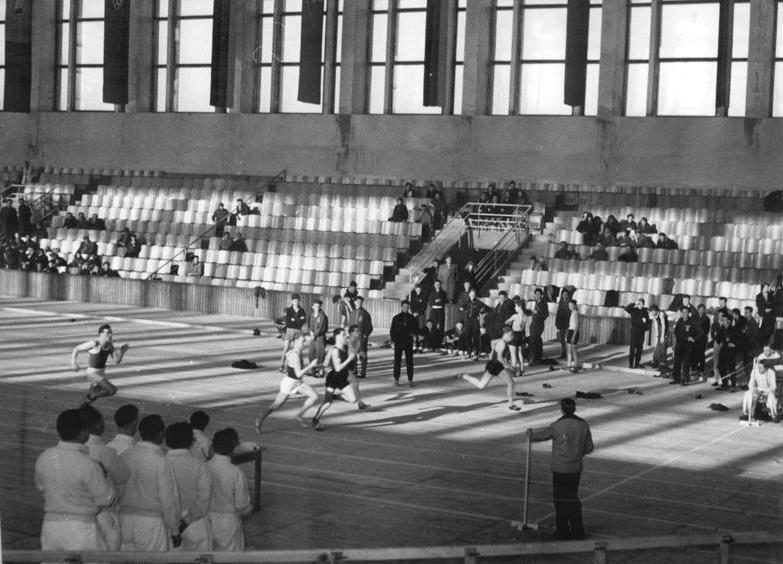
Inside the Dynamo-Sporthalle during an Athletics Festival in 1958

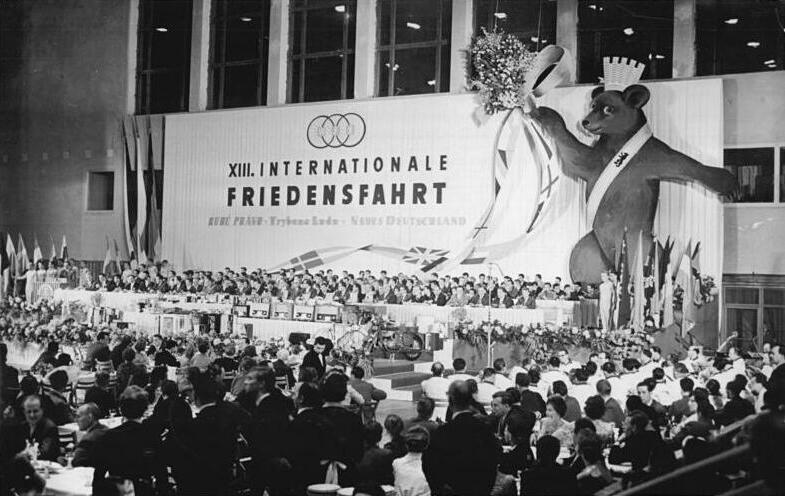
Celebrations during the 1960 Peace Race in the Dynamo-Sporthalle in 1960

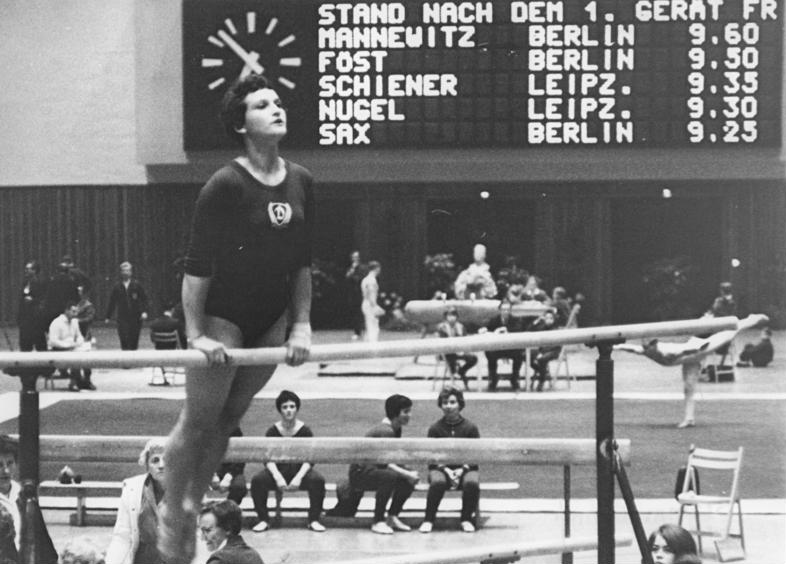
Athlete Ingrid Föst of SC Dynamo Berlin during the Werner-Seelenbinder-Gedenkturnier in the Dynamo-Sporthalle in 1963
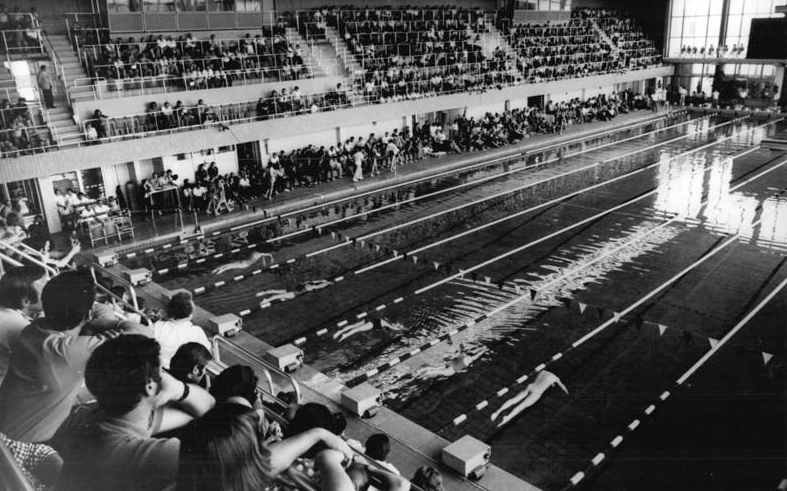
Inside the swimming hall during the East German Swimming Championship in 1976

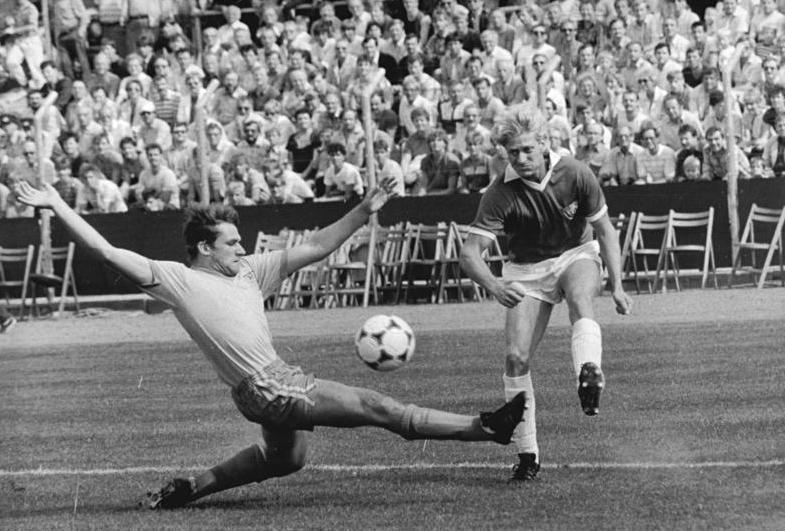
Michael Schulz of BFC Dynamo and defending Mario Roth of FC Vorwärts Frankfurt, during a match at the Dynamo-Stadion im Sportforum on 16 August 1986

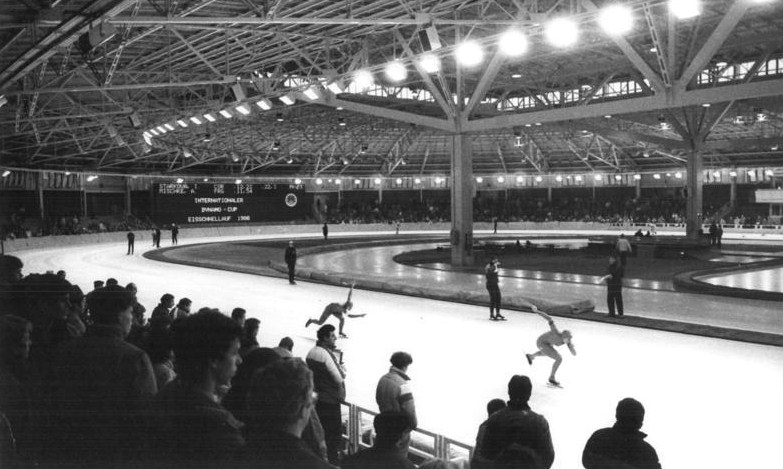
The International Dynamo-Cup in the speed scating ovan in December 1986

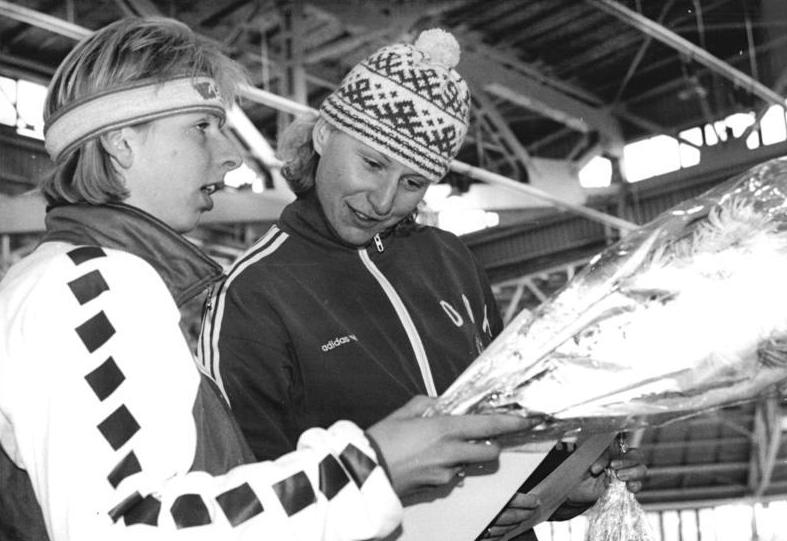
Dutch speed scater Christine Aaftink together with East German speed skater Angela Hauck during the 1989 ISU Speed Skating World Cup in the speed skating oval in 1989

== See also ==
- SV Dynamo
- SC Dynamo Berlin
