= Sportanlage Am Stern =

Association football venue in Germany

- Full name: Sportanlage Am Stern
- Location: Potsdam, Germany
- Capacity: > 1,000
- Surface: Grass

Tenant
- Fortuna Babelsberg

The Sportanlage Am Stern is a football stadium in the south-east of Potsdam, Germany.

Fortuna Babelsberg play their home games here.
