= Fortuna Babelsberg =

German football club

- Full name: Fortuna Babelsberg e.V.
- Founded: 1905
- Ground: Sportanlage Am Stern
- Capacity: 2,000
- Chairman: Christopher Wittke
- Trainer: Kai Möbius
- League: Verbandsliga Brandenburg (VI)
- 2022–23: 1st (Landesliga Nord (VII))
Home colours	Away colours

Fortuna Babelsberg is a German football club from the south-eastern part of the city (Am Stern) of Potsdam in Brandenburg. A former top-flight East German side, they currently play in the Brandenburgliga, the sixth tier of the German football league system.

== History ==
The history of the club begins with the 1906 establishment of Concordia Babelsberg. The club was lost in 1933 when left-leaning worker's sports clubs were disbanded under the Third Reich. A side more politically palatable to the regime was formed in 1934 as VfL Eintracht 06 Babelsberg. This club was also in its turn lost in the aftermath of World War II when organizations across Germany, including sports and football associations, were dissolved by occupying Allied authorities.

=== Play in East German competition ===
After the war a separate football competition emerged in the Soviet-occupied eastern half of the country. Sportgruppe Babelsberg was formed in 1946 out of the former memberships of VfL and SpVgg Potsdam. The Potsdamers established a separate side known as SG Karl Marx Babelsberg in 1948. SG Babelsberg then went on to capture a division title in the Landesliga Brandenburg-West in 1949. On 11 July that year SG became part of Betriebbsportgemeinschaft Märkische Volksstimme Babelsberg, formed only months earlier on 26 May 1949. The new club joined the top-flight eastern competition known as the DDR-Oberliga for the 1949–50 season.

Sport in the German Democratic Republic (Deutsche Demokratische Republik, DDR; commonly East Germany) was subject to manipulation for political purposes, and like other football clubs there, the team would undergo a number of name changes and restructurings. On 30 October 1950 the team was renamed BSG Rotation Babelsberg and affiliated with the country's printing and publishing sector. In 1952, the club merged with BSG Rotation Babelsberg-Ost which had originally played as SG Kinostudio Babelsberg. Through most of the 1950s, Rotation remained in upper-tier play, where they earned mid-to-lower table results.

The 1950–51 season was marked by the outstanding individual performance of Johannes Schöne, who scored 37 goals, a DDR-Oberliga record that was never broken. Three Babelsberg players earned caps with the national side in the course of the decade. The side made several appearances in FDGB Pokal (East German Cup) tournament play, with their best result being an advance to the semifinals in 1951.

Babelsberg was relegated to the DDR-Liga (II) in 1959 after a 14th-place finish. In 1960 the club surrendered its place in the second tier to Sport-Club Potsdam, a side formed out of BSG. The remainder of the club was assigned to third-division play in the 2. DDR-Liga as part of the parent club's second team squad, BSG Rotation Babelsberg II. The Potsdamer side played four seasons in the DDR-Liga before becoming part of BSG Motor Babelsberg after the 1964–65 season. Rotation languished in lower-tier competition, and on 3 May 1969 the team was renamed BSG DEFA Babelsberg.

=== Post unification ===
Following German reunification in 1990 the club adopted the name SG Fortuna Babelsberg and in 1992 won promotion to the Landesliga Brandenburg (VI). Two years later they climbed into the state's highest play class, the Verbandsliga Brandenburg (V), where they would compete for five seasons before being relegated, achieving a tenth place as its best result in the first two seasons.

The club played in the Landesliga again after this before dropping to another level, afterwards to the tier-eight Landesklasse in 2012, they reached tier-seven the Landesliga Nord in 2017 and now they are in tier-six Brandenburgliga since 2023.

== Stadium ==
Fortuna Babelsburg play their home games at Sportanlage Am Stern in the southeast part of Potsdam. The stadium can seat up to 2,000 fans. Until 1986, the club played at the Karl-Liebknecht-Stadion.
