= 1946 in Germany =

- Decades: 1920s; 1930s; 1940s; 1950s; 1960s
- See also: Other events of 1946; History of Germany • Timeline • Years

Events in the year 1946 in Germany.

== Events ==
=== January ===
- January:
  - German steel production limited to 25% of prewar level by the Allied Control Council.
  - British occupation zone denazification responsibilities turned over to the Germans.
  - Soviet 2nd Shock Army returned to the Soviet Union.
- 8 January: Braunschweiger Zeitung founded.

=== February ===
- 1 February: Southwest German Radio Symphony Orchestra founded.
- 5 February: Soviet 47th Army disbanded.
- 20 February: The worst explosion in German history kills more than 300 coal miners in Bergkamen.
- 21 February: Die Zeit founded two days later.

=== March ===
- March:
  - Law for Liberation from National Socialism and Militarism turns denazification responsibility over to the Germans.
  - Seventh United States Army inactivated.
  - Bamberg Symphony founded.
- 2 March: Rheinische Post founded.

=== April ===
- April: Badisches Volksecho founded.
- 2 April: Die Welt founded.
- 3 April: Lübecker Nachrichten founded.
- 8 April: Sozialistische Einheit ceased publication.
- 13 April: Sächsische Zeitung founded.
- 21 April:
  - Merger of the KPD and SPD into the Socialist Unity Party of Germany.
  - Deutsche Volkszeitung ceased publication.
- 23 April:
  - Neues Deutschland founded.
  - Das Volk ceased publication.

=== May ===
- 16 May: Handelsblatt founded.
- 17 May: DEFA film studio founded.
- 20 May: Lausitzer Rundschau founded.

=== June ===
- June: Gehlen Organization established.
- 29 June: Provisional German administration under Soviet supervision established in the state of Mecklenburg-Vorpommern.
- 30 June: June 1946 Bavarian state election.

=== July ===
- July: Europa-Archiv founded.
- 1 July: ABC-Zeitung founded.

=== August ===
- 20 August: Dissolution of the Wehrmacht.

=== September ===
- 6 September: Restatement of Policy on Germany.
- 16 September: BRIXMIS established.

=== October ===
- 1 October: Nuremberg trials conclude.
- 15 October: Hermann Göring commits suicide into his cell of Nuremberg Prison three hours before his execution
- 16 October: Nuremberg executions.
- 20 October:
  - 1946 Berlin state election.
  - 1946 Soviet occupation zone state elections.
  - Rhine Province disestablished.

=== November ===
- 13 November: Münchner Merkur founded.

=== December ===
- 1 December: December 1946 Bavarian state election.
- 5 December: Hamburg Ravensbrück trials begin.
- 11 December: Hörzu founded.
- 21 December: Middle Rhine Football Association founded.
- Christmas: First edition of Auto motor und sport appears.

=== Undated ===
- Average intake per day of 1,080 kilocalories.
- German Association for Housing, Urban and Spatial Development founded.
- Hansawelle founded.
- Südwest Presse founded.
- West German Athletics Championships established.
- Westphalian Football and Athletics Association founded.

== Births ==
- 10 January – Dieter Fersch, German alpine skier
- 23 February — Bodo Hauser, German journalist and writer (died 2004)
- 25 February — Franz Xaver Kroetz, German dramatist
- 27 March — Olaf Malolepski, German musician (Die Flippers)
- 16 April – Mordechai Geldman, Israeli poet and writer (died 2021)
- 17 April — Georges J. F. Köhler, German biologist (died 1995)
- 9 May — Drafi Deutscher, German singer (died 2006)
- 14 May — Elmar Brok, German politician
- 15 May – Klaus-Peter Siegloch, German journalist
- 17 May — Udo Lindenberg, German singer
- 1 June — Werner Müller, German politician and businessman (died 2019)
- 4 June — Hans-Josef Klauck, German theologian and priest (died 2025)
- 26 June — Maria von Welser, German journalist
- 1 July:
  - Stefan Aust, German journalist
  - Rosalie Abella, German jurist
- 10 July – Max Rieger, German alpine skier
- 20 August
  - Henryk M. Broder, German journalist
  - Ralf Hütter, German techno musician
- 2 September — Angelika Volquartz, German politician
- 15 September — Gerd Uecker, German artistic director (died 2024)
- 26 September – Margret Hafen, alpine skier
- 1 October — Michael Sladek, German physician and environmentalist (died 2024)
- 6 October
  - Otmar Bernhard, German politician
  - Renate Holub, German philosopher
- 14 December — Ruth Fuchs, German athlete (died 2023)
- 30 December — Berti Vogts, German football player and manager

== Deaths ==
- February 8 - Felix Hoffmann, German chemist (born 1868)
- February 10 - Eduard Fresenius, German entrepreneur (born 1874)
- May 16 - Bruno Tesch, German chemist and entrepreneur (born 1890)
- June 6 - Gerhart Hauptmann, German dramatist (born 1862)
- September 6 - Alfred Körte, German philologist (born 1866)
- 15 October — Hermann Göring, World War I fighter ace and Reichsmarshall of Nazi Germany (born 1893)
- 16 October — Alfred Rosenberg, Nazi ideologue (born 1893)
- Date unknown — Albert Hinrich Hussmann, artist and sculptor
