= Propaganda in East Germany =

Propaganda in East Germany encompasses the systematic effort of the Socialist Unity Party of Germany under the influence and oversight of the Soviet Union to instill socialist ideology into East German society to maintain political control over the territory between the founding of the GDR in 1949 and its dissolution in 1990. Functioning as a core pillar of the state apparatus, propaganda sought to legitimize the rule of the party while discrediting Western capitalist influences.

The state used a variety of modes to transmit political messages, including mass media channels, interpersonal transmission, agitprop, and architecture. Through censorship, the regime blocked the influx of Western ideas and suppressed any political discourse that contradicted the official party line.

A map of occupied Berlin

== Purpose ==
The purpose of propaganda in the German Democratic Republic was to maintain the Soviet ideology of socialism. Through various forms of propaganda, such as posters, pamphlets and speeches, the Soviet Union censored the ideas of the Allied forces and the outside world from the citizens of Eastern Germany. News published in the GDR was intended to inform the East German public of how current events fit into "the overall pattern of historical necessity," with news editors specifically instructed by the government to extract "from every item of news its possible relevance to the global struggle between capitalism and communism."

The GDR used propaganda to frame the United States and its Western allies, particularly West Germany, as ideological and economic adversaries. A prime example occurred in 1950, when the state officials alleged the United States for sabotaged potato crops in East Germany by airdropping Colorado potato beetles onto crops.

== Media ==
Media for East German propaganda during the Cold War played a very significant role in the persuasion of the East German people at this time. It was the most powerful tool to reach large numbers of East German citizens throughout the entire territory. Filtering what information was circulated, the state used a variety of media outlets to highlight the perceived success of the socialist system and to suppress any information that might prove harmful to that end. This way, the state tried shaping its image for both domestic audiences and international observers and increasing state legitimacy. The types of media that were most prevalent in their propaganda efforts were posters, pamphlets, newspapers, and speeches.

=== Posters ===
During the Cold War period, the state used political posters to emphasize the Soviet Union's importance in establishing a socialist state. Iconographies of Joseph Stalin, creating a cult of personality, portrayed the former Soviet leader as "father of the nation" and builder of socialism. The imagery was paired with messaging framing Soviet institutions as the foundation for a peaceful and stable society. Propaganda posters also utilized negative depictions of Western Allied forces to align public sentiment against Western influences with that of the regime and promote the perceived superiority of socialism and the strength of alliances within the Eastern Bloc.

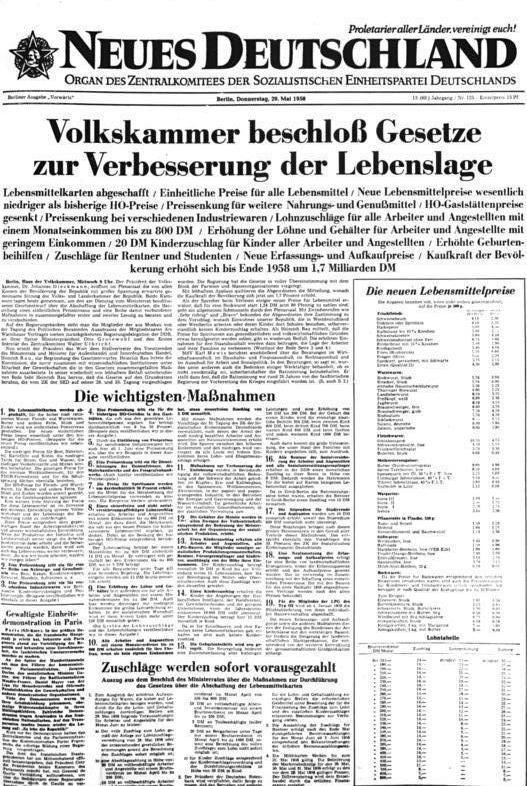
cover of Neues Deutschland newspaper

=== Pamphlets ===
The German Democratic Republic created pamphlets to promote a socialist and peaceful way of life to those living in Eastern Germany. These pamphlets were dropped in the Federal Territory of East German zones in large "propaganda rockets" and small "metal coconuts," along with "occurrence reports" that document the times they were sent and 'outside occurrences' to spread their news in an innovative, creative, and far-reaching way. The "propaganda rockets" allowed for more people to be exposed to the information over a large geographic scale.

=== Newspapers ===
Socialist newspapers were used to transmit the Marxist-Leninist worldview to a wide readership on a regular basis. Scholarly perspectives on newspapers in East Germany find that the medium was not merely used as a monotonous and uniform channel for static socialist ideology that lacked informational content. Rather, the publications were tools of political public relations.

Neues Deutschland was the GDR's state newspaper, financed and public by the Socialist Unity Party. It appeared first on April 23, 1946, and transmitted party-political views on all matters of everyday life, including culture, literature, sports, and social affairs. However, it has been claimed that the GDR's state newspaper, Neues Deutschland, failed to reach much of the East German population. The Neue Zeit was the party magazine of the East German Christian Democratic Union, operating as a bloc party under the control of the SED. The Berliner Zeitung is Berlin's oldest continuous daily newspaper, operating since May 21, 1945. Despite its location in Berlin and its proximity to the party, it could maintain a distinct profile. Targeting a younger readership, Junge Welt also published a children's magazine, which used to include board games.

=== Speeches and Commemoration ===
Public oratories served as a primary method for communicating the SED's political objectives to the public, its progress, and its relation to the Soviet Union to the public. State officials gave speeches at anniversaries and holidays to stress the perceived stability of the socialist system and the success of the collaboration within the Eastern Bloc.

An important component of public oration was speeches delivered at national memorial sites, including former concentration camps like Buchenwald, Ravensbrück, and Sachsenhausen, particularly during liberation anniversaries. Research by the historian Anne-Kathleen Tillack-Graf indicates that these occasions often prioritized current political and economic issues of the GDR over the actual historical experience of people in concentration camps. Accordingly, the main topics of the speakers concerned Cold War issues such as peaceful coexistence, the arms race between the Soviet Union and the USA, or Ronald Reagan's Star Wars. In that regard, the historical narrative was often framed to emphasize the antifascist origins of the GDR and the perceived social strength of the system.

== Architecture ==
The state used architecture and socialist urban planning as key propaganda instruments. A prominent example is the Karl-Marx-Allee, a 2.3-kilometer, 90-meters-wide boulevard in the Berlin districts Friedrichshain and Mitte. From the beginning of its construction, between 1949 until 1961, the boulevard was named Stalinallee. Its design and function incorporate several key propaganda techniques.

The width of the boulevard was not designed for civilian traffic but for a demonstration of power. The wedding-cake style design reflects classic stylistic elements of Stalinist architecture. Incorporating motifs by Karl Friedrich Schinkel, the architects blended Marxist-Leninist ideology with Prussian classicism to legitimize the GDR as the heir of German tradition. Leading architects, including Hermann Henselmann, Egon Hartmann, Hans Hop, Kurt W. Leucht, Richard Paulick, and Josef Souradny, used the scale and ornamentation of the boulevard to communicate the power and grandeur of the German Democratic Republic. The spacious building on the Karl-Marx-Allee featured modern amenities, including hot running water, fitted bathrooms and kitchens, and telephone outlets. While the GDR could not sustain a degree of luxurious construction in the long run due to shortages of raw materials and workers, media portrayals of the boulevard could be used to prove how the state was able to provide a bourgeois standard of living under socialist organization.

== Youth and Education ==
A key aspect of the state's propaganda efforts has been the formation of a socialist personality, targeting East German citizens from early childhood to instill state loyalty early on. In mass youth organizations, children have been integrated into the socialist framework. While membership was officially voluntary, it was closely linked to educational advancements and later career opportunities. Young children between the ages of 6 and 14 were part of the Thälmann Pioneers. Teenagers and young adults organized in the Free German Youth (FDJ).

== Censorship Backlash in 1989 ==
In 1989, the emigration crisis, a massive exodus of East German citizens to West Germany over Hungary and Czechoslovakia, paralyzed the government and became a pivotal event in the collapse of the Soviet Union and the fall of the Berlin Wall. When the GDR state news channels censored the crisis, public approval rates dropped significantly. Despite the state's tight grip on the domestic media, East German citizens with access to alternative information started informing themselves through reports on West German television. Particularly the main evening newscast Tagesschau enabled people to compare domestic reports to those of the West German media landscape and thus to identify discrepancies, which seriously impacted state approval rates at the time. Resulting dissatisfaction was shared by members of the Socialist Unity Party, who realized how misinformation by the state can undermine the regime's long-term legitimacy. However, empirical research has shown that approval ratings remained higher in regions such as Dresden or Greifswald, where people had limited access to Western media outlets, highlights the pivotal role of alternative sources of information and their power to undermine state propaganda efforts.
