= Propaganda in Germany =

Propaganda in Germany may refer to:

- German propaganda during World War I
- Propaganda in Nazi Germany
- Propaganda in East Germany
