= Straße der Pariser Kommune =

Street in Berlin, Germany

Coordinates: 52°30′45″N 13°26′19″E

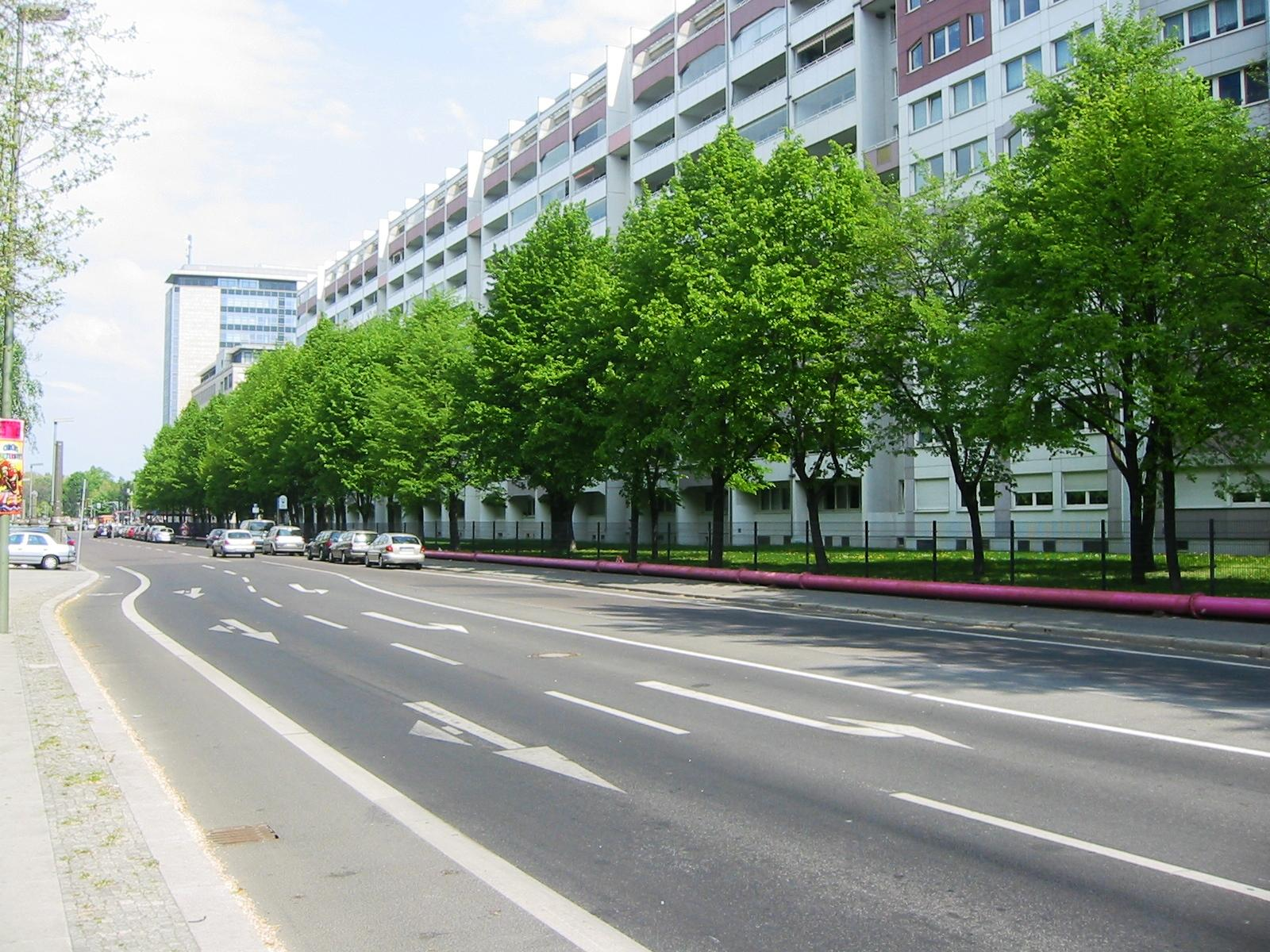
Straße der Pariser Kommune in Friedrichshain

The Straße der Pariser Kommune is a street in Friedrichshain, Berlin, Germany. It was known as Fruchtstraße until March 17, 1971, when it was renamed to commemorate the 100th anniversary of the Paris Commune.

The road begins at the meeting point of Mühlenstrasse and Straulauer Platz, which run parallel to the River Spree, and continues north along the rails of the Ostbahnhof to the Karl-Marx-Allee. It becomes the Friedenstraße just beyond this, where it meets the Palisadenstraße and the Weidenweg.

North of the Ostbahnhof, it is almost entirely lined with communist-era apartment buildings, though some older buildings have been preserved at the intersection with the Karl-Marx-Allee. One may also find along it the Pegasus youth hostel, the DDR-style Ostel, the offices of the Neues Deutschland publishing house, and some clubs and shops.
