= Statue of Joseph Stalin, Berlin =

Bronze statue in Germany

Statue of Joseph Stalin
- de: Stalindenkmal
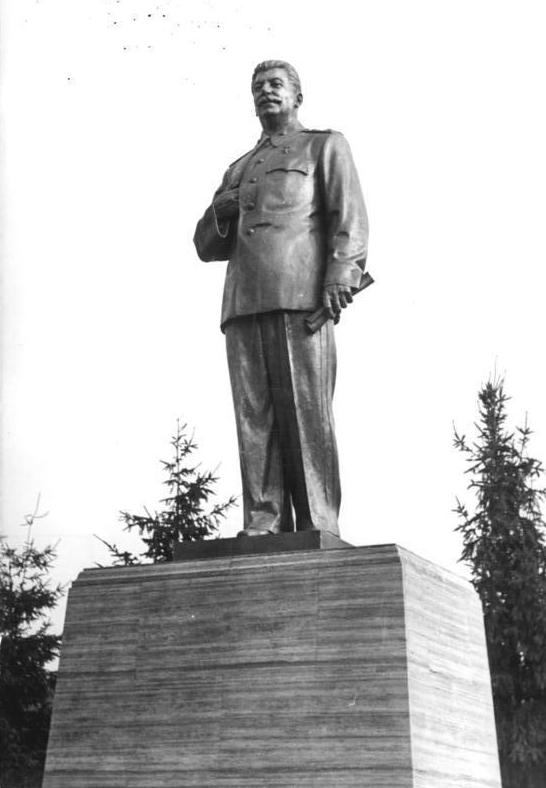
- Statue of Stalin on Stalinallee in Berlin-Friedrichshain, 1951

- Artist: Grigory Postnikov or Nikolai Tomsky and Sergey Merkurov
- Year: 1951
- Medium: Bronze
- Subject: Joseph Stalin
- Dimensions: 4.8 m (16 ft)
- Location: Stalinallee, Berlin
- 52.5175°N 13.4347°E

The Berlin Stalin statue (German: Stalindenkmal) was a bronze portrayal of the Soviet leader Joseph Stalin. A Komsomol delegation had presented the sculpture to the East Berlin government on the occasion of the Third World Festival of Youth and Students in 1951. The monument was formally dedicated on 3 August 1951 after temporary placement at a location on a newly designed and impressive boulevard, Stalinallee, being constructed at the time in what was then the Berlin district of Friedrichshain. Stalin monuments were generally removed from public view by the leadership of the Soviet Union and other associated countries, including East Germany, during the period of De-Stalinization. In Berlin the statue and all street signs designating Stalinallee were hastily removed one night in a clandestine operation and the street was renamed Karl-Marx-Allee and Frankfurter Allee. The bronze sculpture was smashed and the pieces were recycled.

== Location and description ==
Stalinallee, formerly the Große Frankfurter Straße, had been badly damaged in World War II and was renamed on Stalin's birthday, 21 December 1949, in honor of the Soviet head of state. The newly designed street was a political statement in a post-war reconstruction effort starting in 1951 and comprised an imposing tree-lined boulevard with shops, entertainment venues, gastronomy, and especially monumental new apartment blocks. These were to be constructed by and for workers.

The 4.80 meter high bronze statue showed the Soviet head of party and state in a typical military pose with a uniform and medals, in his left hand a scroll. The slightly conical three-meter high pedestal, variously described as being made of marble, concrete or sandstone, was placed on a masonry platform. The temporary location between Andreasstrasse and Koppenstrasse was across the street from a sports hall built in 1951 for the World Festival of Youth and Students (the building was demolished in 1972).

Which Soviet artist created the statue is a matter of debate among experts. According to one source it was presumably created in the atelier of the Soviet sculptor Grigory Postnikov (Григорий Николаевич Постников, 1914–1978). Other sources name Nikolai Tomsky and Sergey Merkurov, the latter because of similarities with a statue erected in 1937 in Moscow. A Russian source states that Tomsky created the monument.

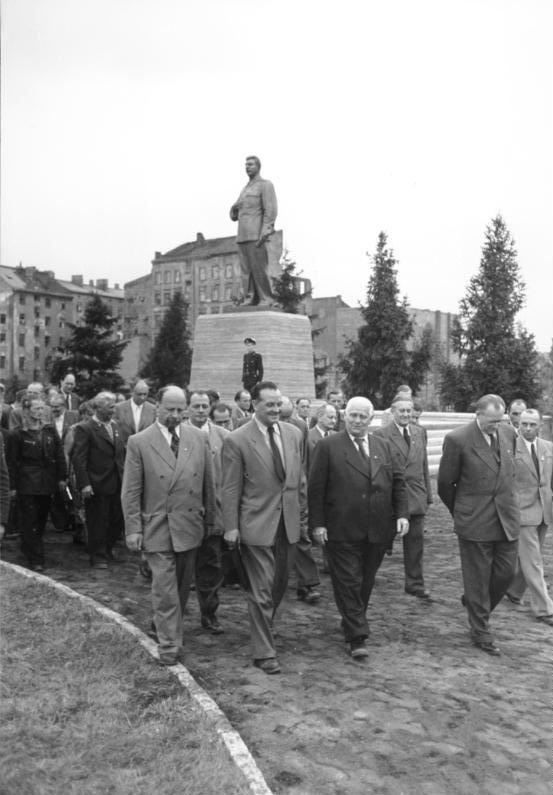
Unofficial photograph taken after the 1951 dedication of the Stalin monument

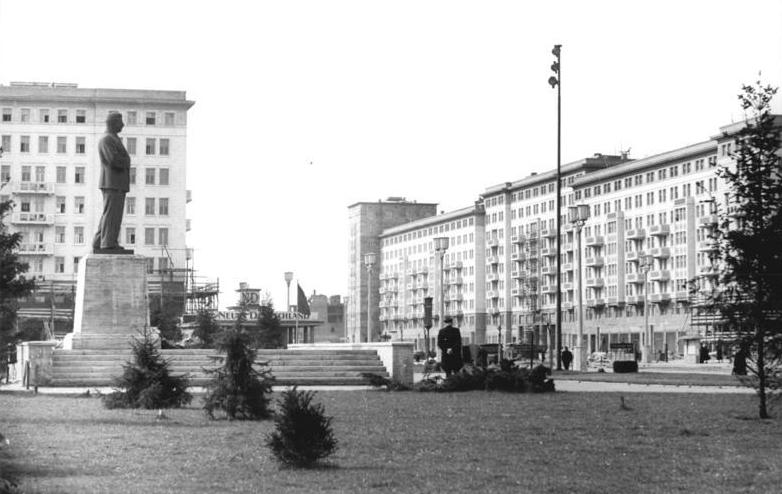
Stalin monument in April 1953 in the context of newly erected buildings on Stalinallee

Contrary to the original intention to move the statue to Strausberger Platz on Stalinallee as soon as that key location was ready for adornment in the late 1950s, it was left at its original location.

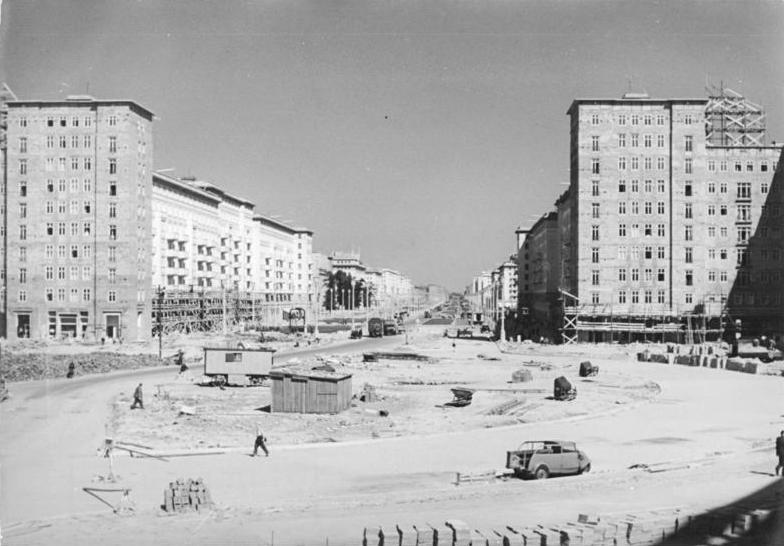
Strausberger Platz under construction in 1953

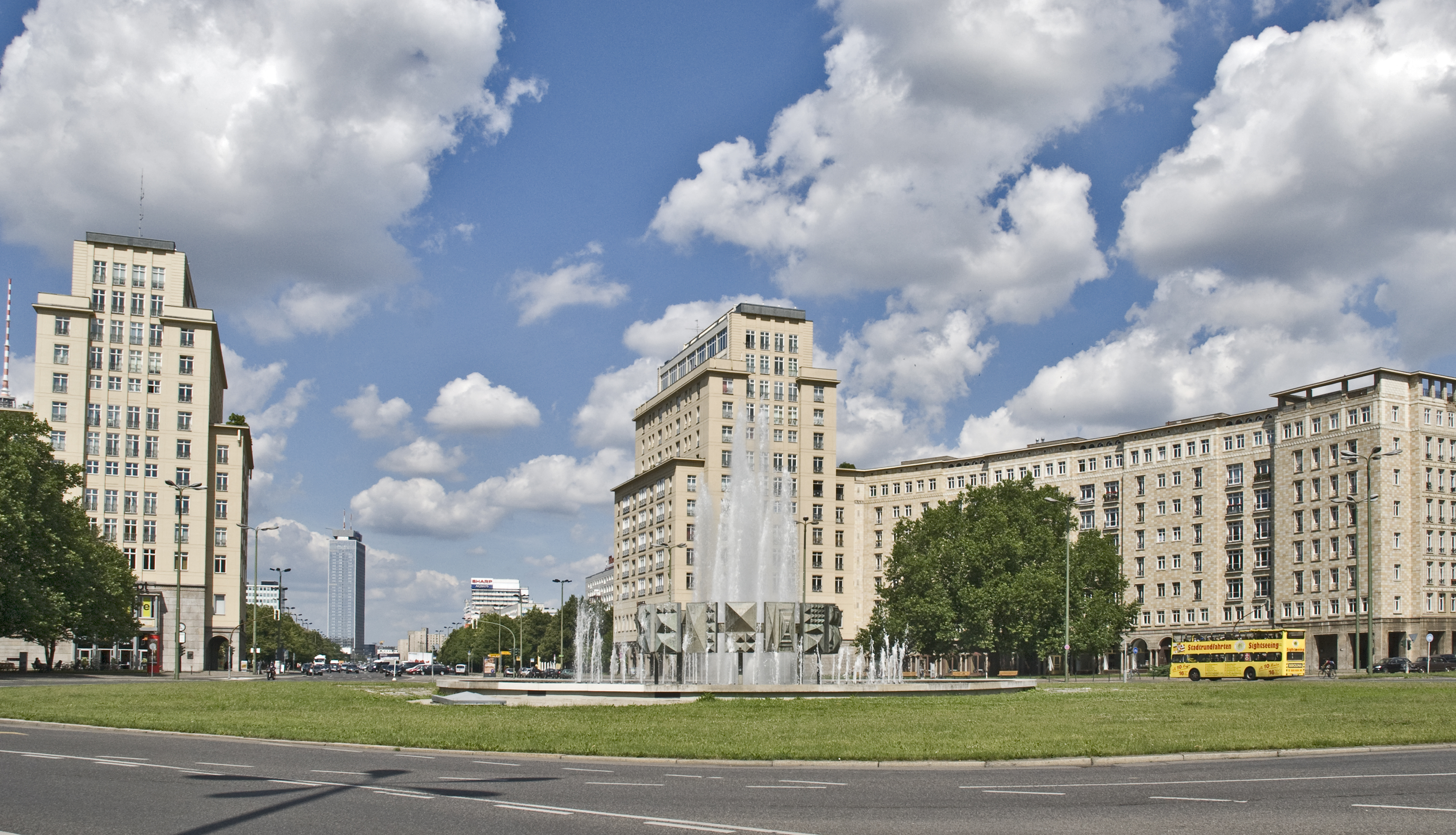
Strausberger Platz in 2011

== Between 1951 and November 1961 ==
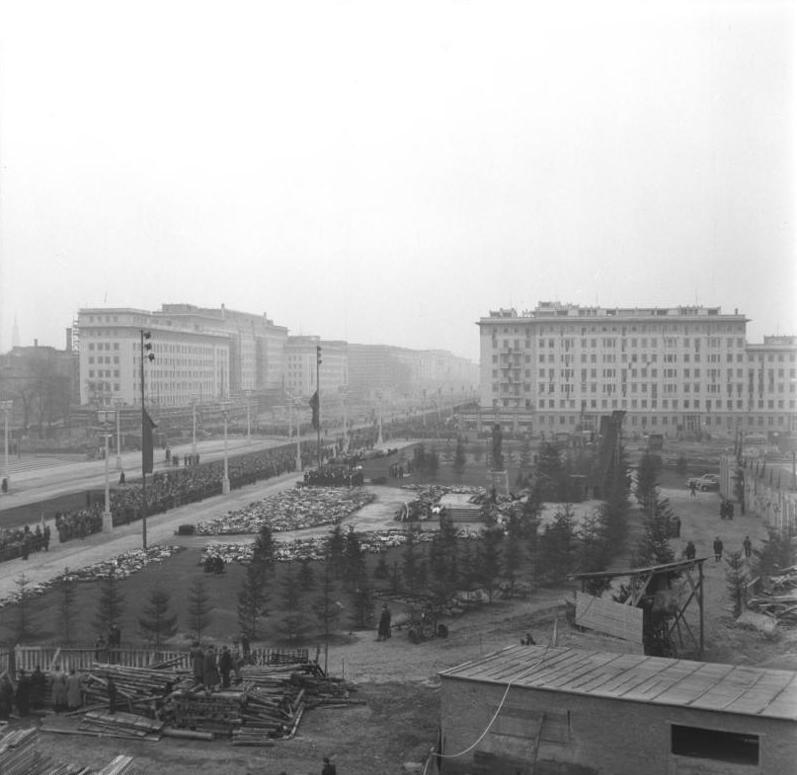
Funeral march passing the Stalin monument on the occasion of Stalin's death in 1953

Stalin died in 1953. On the day of his interment, March 9, the monument was the destination of a funeral march in East Berlin which lasted over seven hours. The deposition of flowers and wreaths, flags draped with black crepe, and flags flown at half-mast on public buildings were intended to express the regard of the German population for the "Genius of Humanity", the "best friend of the German people" and the "brilliant leader of the world peace camp". On the day after Stalin's death, minutes of silence were organized in his memory in schools.

The popular uprising on 17 June 1953 soon turned into a widespread revolt against the government of the German Democratic Republic (GDR) and encompassed many East German cities. The focus of the demonstrations and confrontations in Berlin was originally the Stalinallee. There was turmoil also at the Stalin monument, which was bombarded with stones but not damaged.

Stalin's personality cult, dictatorship and crimes were denounced in a secret speech by Nikita Khrushchev at the 20th Congress of the Communist Party of the Soviet Union in 1956. After it was decided at the 22nd Congress of the Communist Party of the Soviet Union in 1961 to remove Stalin's remains from Lenin's Mausoleum on Moscow's Red Square and to rename several cities which had been named after him, the Soviet government reburied the dictator's corpse in the Kremlin Wall Necropolis, honoring it with a marble bust.

== Clandestine removal of the Berlin monument ==
The governments of other socialist countries, including the GDR, also renounced the Stalin cult. In the night from 13 to 14 November 1961 all the street signs on Stalinallee in Berlin were removed in a clandestine operation. The western section between Alexanderplatz and Frankfurter Tor was renamed Karl-Marx-Allee, the eastern section between Frankfurter Tor and the Lichtenberg viaduct was given the name Frankfurter Allee. That same night the statue was pushed off its pedestal with a bulldozer and a low-load truck brought the bronze statue to a factory hall of Bauunion, a construction company. Several members of a Stalinallee construction team under brigade leader Gerhard Wolf had the job of reducing the statue to small pieces under guard by security forces. The responsible Stasi member gave the following orders: "The monument is to be reduced to unrecognizable pieces. No remnants may be taken away. Nothing is to be said about this entire matter." The statue's pedestal was removed the next morning by soldiers of the GDR's National People's Army.

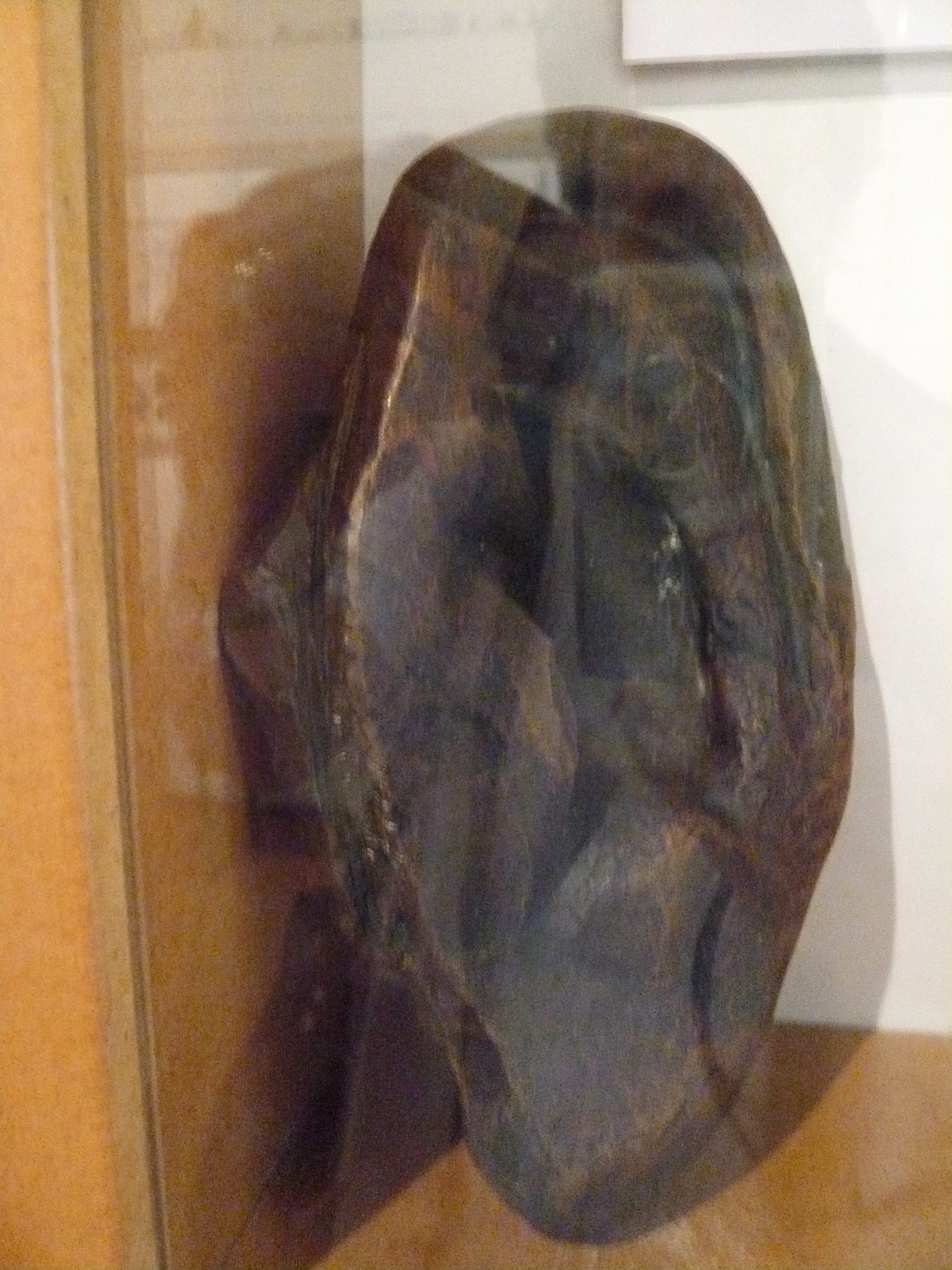
Original piece of the Stalin statue (left ear) on display at Café Sibylle

Some of the workers assigned to destroy the monument nevertheless managed to secretly appropriate fragments of the shattered statue. After the fall of the Berlin Wall and German reunification the brigade leader who had had the task of destroying the head turned over two leftover pieces of the statue, an ear and part of the mustache, to the Geschichtswerkstatt Stalinallee, a group researching the history of Stalinallee. He also provided a report on the details of the monument removal operation. The sculpture had been broken down into small pieces, melted, and used to recast other works of art, perhaps statues of animals for the East Berlin zoo.

On 14 November 1961 the city authorities (Magistrat von Berlin) supplied the daily newspapers with the following announcement about what happened:

Having taken note of the material from the 22nd Congress of the Communist Party of the Soviet Union, the Greater-Berlin city authorities agreed at its meeting of 13 November 1961 on the following measures in connection with the infringement of revolutionary legitimacy which occurred in the period of Stalin's personality cult:

1. The section from Alexanderplatz to Frankfurter Tor of what has up to now been Stalinallee is to be renamed Karl-Marx-Allee.
2. The section of Stalinallee from Frankfurter Tor eastward is to be given the name Frankfurter Allee.
3. The monument to J. W. Stalin is to be removed.
4. The Stalinallee S-Bahn station is to be renamed S-Bahnhof Frankfurter Allee. Correspondingly, the U-Bahn Station Stalinallee is to be renamed U-Bahnhof Frankfurter Allee.
5. In the name VEB Elektroapparatewerke J. W. Stalin, the addition J. W. Stalin is to be deleted. The company is henceforth to bear the name VEB Elektroapparatewerke Berlin Treptow.

== Sequel and memory preservation ==
The location of the Stalin monument was later disguised by replacing the surrounding pavement slabs and installing a fountain. Bushes and trees have since become established there; the three-basin fountain was out of operation for several years but is again functioning, as of summer 2023. Artefacts of the monument and the story of its removal as well as other material and information relating to the history of Stalinallee/Karl-Marx-Allee are on permanent display at Café Sibylle at Karl-Marx-Allee 72.

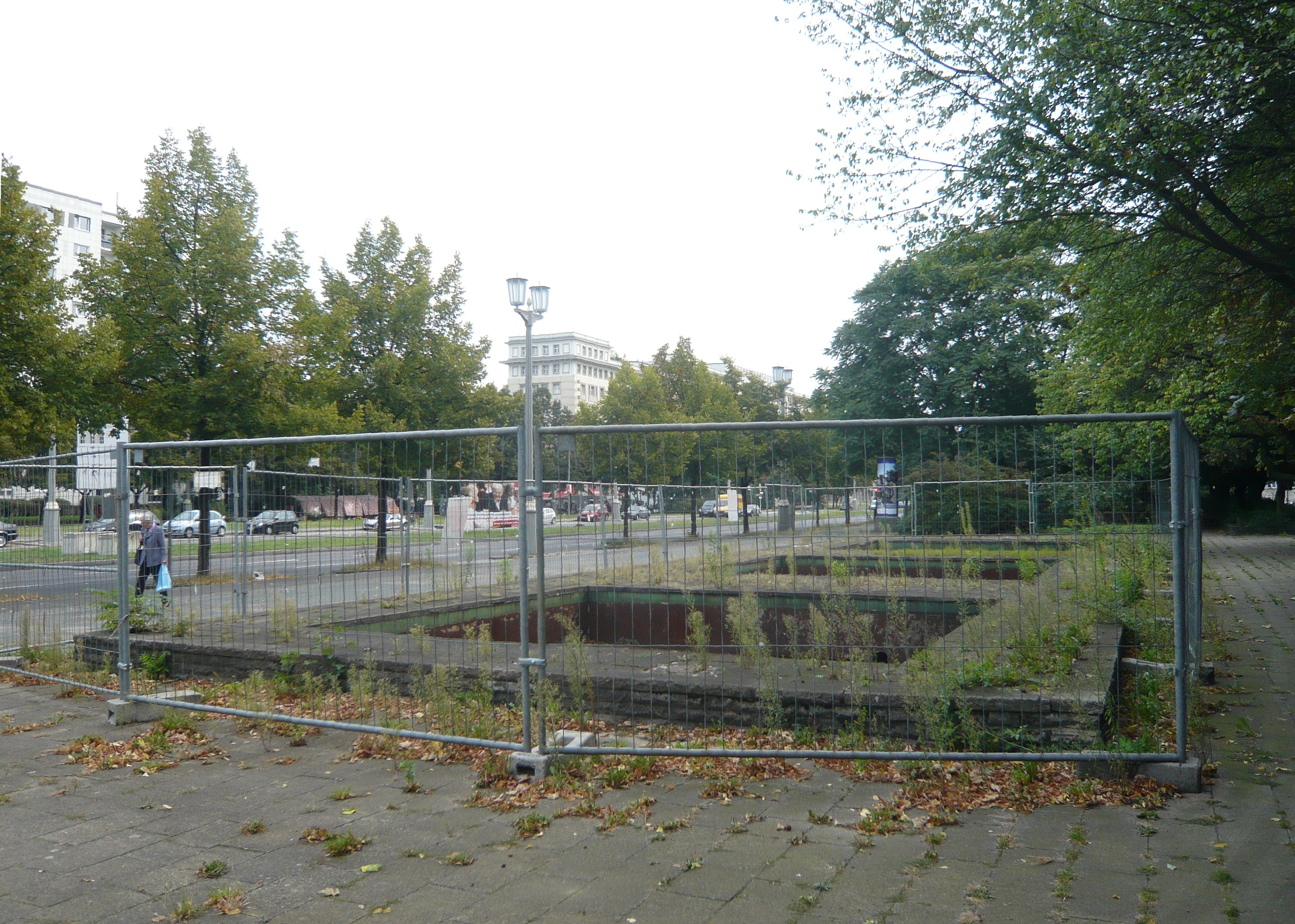
Location of the destroyed Stalin statue in a photograph from 2009

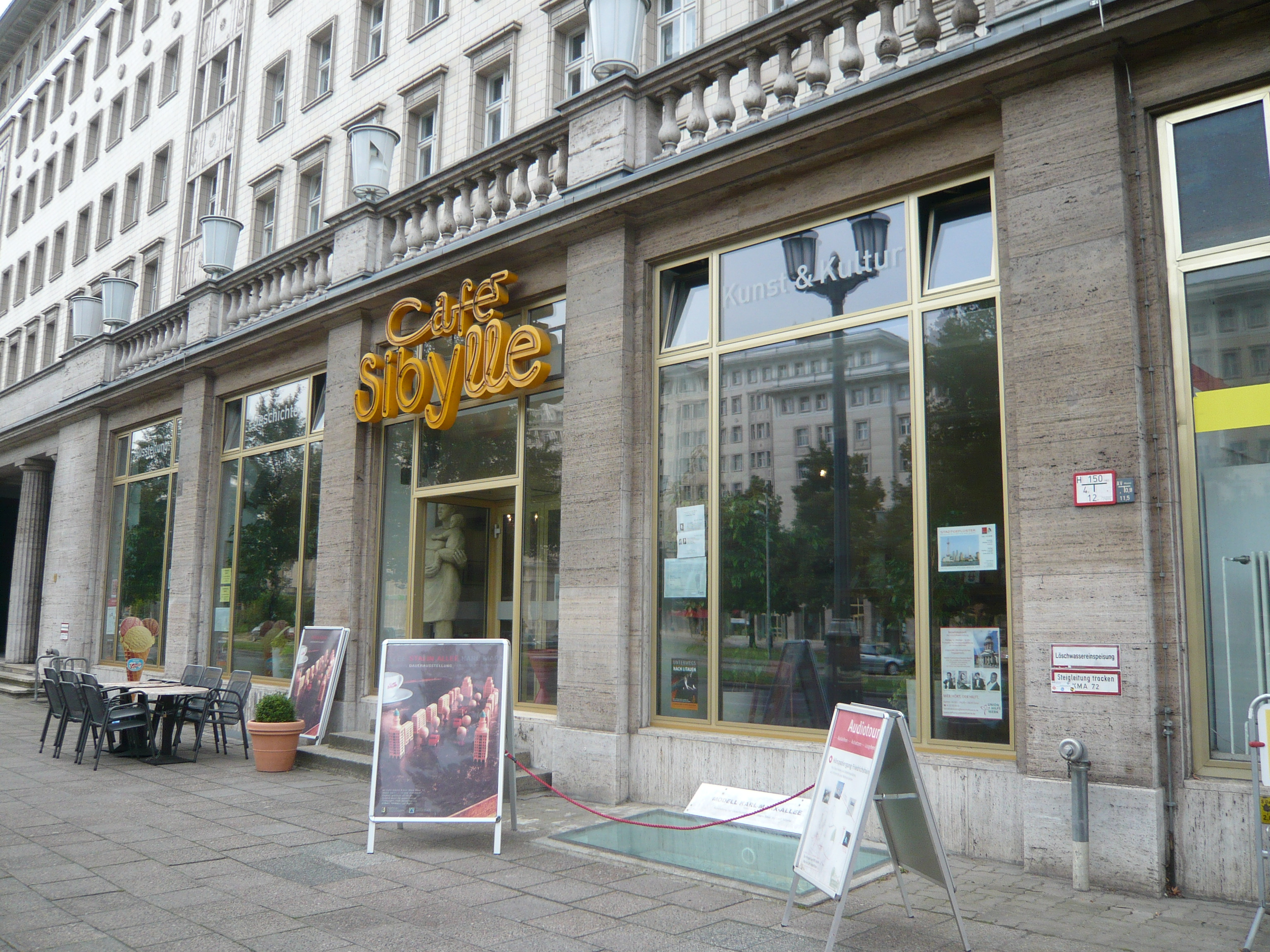
Café Sibylle, which houses an exhibition on the history of Stalinallee

== Stalin monuments in other GDR cities ==
In other East German cities, monuments in honor of Stalin had been erected in central locations. Until de-Stalinization began, they were the setting for state-organized celebratory events and proclamations. The monuments were later quietly removed without public discussion in ways similar to what took place in Berlin.

== Literature (in German) ==
- Günter Feist (Hrsg.), Kunstdokumentation SBZ, DDR 1945–1990: Aufsätze, Berichte, Materialien, Berlin 1996, p. 414 (with the name of the sculptor)
- Jan Feustel: Spaziergänge in Friedrichshain. Haude und Spener, Berlin, 1994, ISBN 3-7759-0357-7; Berlinische Reminiszenzen, Vol. 64, pp. 105–117: Das längste Baudenkmal Deutschlands – Durch die ehemalige Stalinallee.
- Jan Feustel, Verschwundenes Friedrichshain: Bauten und Denkmale im Berliner Osten, Berlin 2001, p. 79
- Achim Hilzheimer, Von der Frankfurter zur Stalinallee: Geschichte einer Straße, Berlin 1997, pp. 19–22, 29
- B. Kohlenbach u.a. (Hrsg.), Denkmale in Berlin: Bezirk Friedrichshain, Berlin, 1996, p. 42
- Wolfgang Weber: DDR – 40 Jahre Stalinismus: Ein Beitrag zur Geschichte DDR. Arbeiterpresse Verlag und Vertriebsgesellschaft, Essen 1992, ISBN 3-88634-056-2, p. 62.

(This article incorporates information from the German Wikipedia)
