= Egon Hartmann =

German architect and city planner

Egon Hartmann

Egon Hartmann (24 August 1919 – 6 December 2009) was a German architect and city planner who won prizes for his city planning concepts for both East and West Berlin.

== Early life and education ==
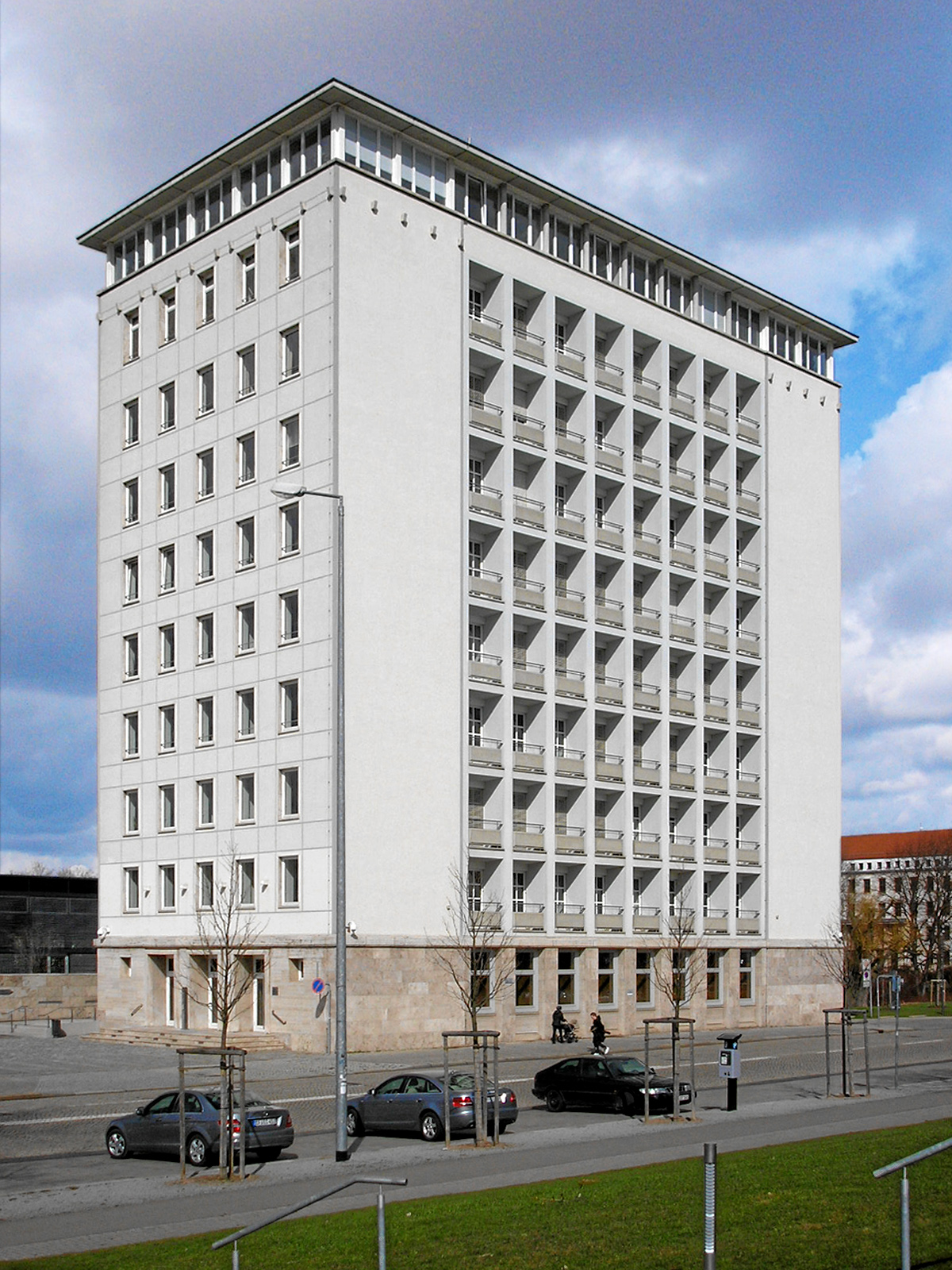
Hartmann's high-rise office building Hochhaus des Thüringer Landtags, Erfurt

Egon Hartmann was born on 24 August 1919 in Reichenberg (Liberec), Czechoslovakia. After graduating from the Staatsgewerbeschule technical high school in 1938, he moved to Berlin to work for the architect Henry König. However, he was drafted into the army in January 1939 and was among the troops that entered Prague during the invasion of Czechoslovakia in March 1939. While injured and on medical leave from the army, he started studying at Bauhaus University, Weimar in winter 1942/43. In late 1944, he was severely wounded in the Courland Pocket, and lost his lower jaw, which made him undergo 48 surgeries and caused him problems for the rest of his life. He resumed his studies in Weimar in 1946, graduating in 1948. In 1962, he obtained a doctoral degree from TH Darmstadt with a thesis about the city development of Mainz, supervised by Max Guther and Karl Gruber.

== Career as architect and city planner ==
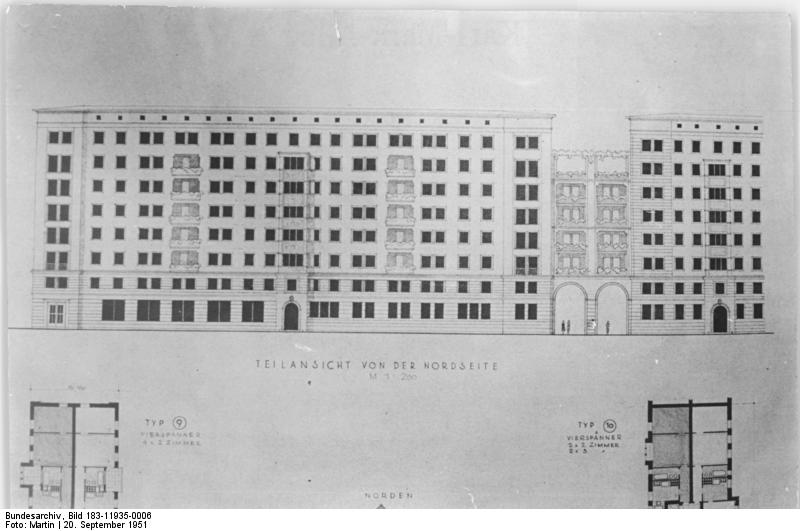
Design drawing by Hartmann for Stalinallee, 1950

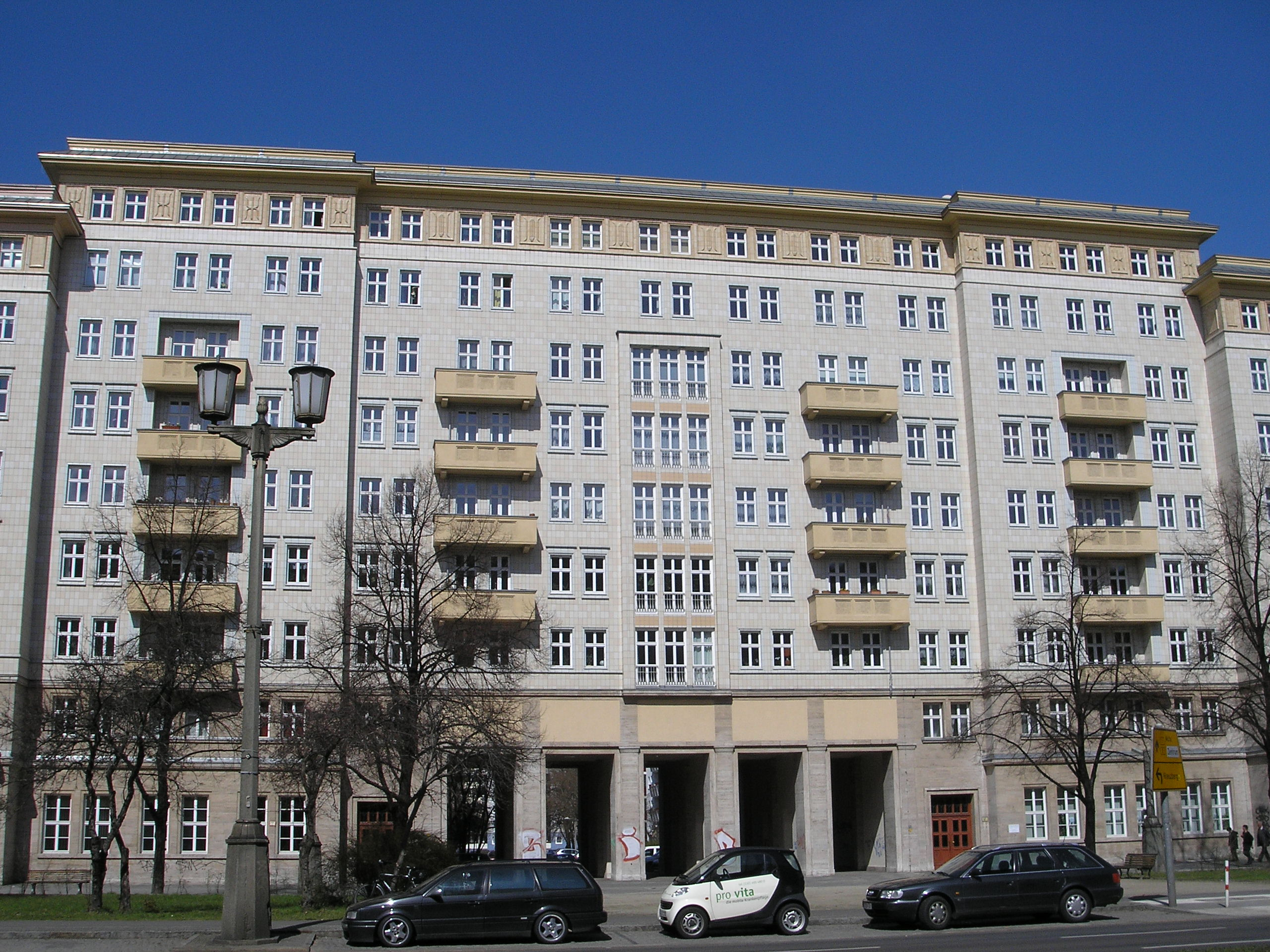
Block B of Karl-Marx-Allee in Berlin, the former Stalinallee

From 1950 to 1954, Hartmann worked for the city and town planning office of Thuringia, becoming its chief architect in 1951. During this time he designed a high-rise government office building in Erfurt now used by the Landtag of Thuringia. This was the first high-rise building in East Germany outside of East Berlin.

In 1951, he won the contest to design the Stalinallee in Berlin. However, Richard Paulick was appointed lead planner, and eventually, only block B was based on Hartmann's designs. His overall plan, while reminiscent of Stalin-era designs for Moscow, is very similar to plans from 1915 for the Straße des 18. Oktober boulevard in Leipzig that leads to the Monument to the Battle of the Nations. In 1954, he did not return from a vacation in Austria, but went to West Germany and took up a position as city planner in Mainz, where he worked among other things on a concept for the post-war reconstruction of the city. In 1958, he won a second prize in a West German competition to plan the reconstruction of Berlin, the same prize level as Hans Scharoun and beating Le Corbusier, whose entry was not ranked. Having been sidelined and with his urban planning initiatives not supported in Mainz, Hartmann moved to Munich in 1959, where he became city director of constructions in 1964 and worked until his retirement in 1976. He was one of the main planners of the Neuperlach satellite district.

== Later life and death ==
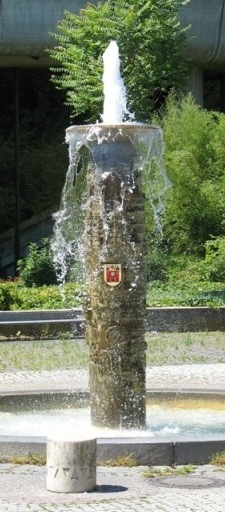
Reichenberger Brunnen, Augsburg

After his retirement at age 57, Hartmann concentrated on his interests in the arts, creating drawings and sculptures. He also designed fountains, including the Reichenberger Brunnen fountain in Augsburg, the twin town of his hometown Liberec (Reichenberg), and a glass fountain in Bad Reichenhall. Hartmann died in Munich on 6 December 2009.

== Sources ==
- Cohen, Jean-Louis; Frank, Hartmut; Ziegler, Volker (4 March 2019). Ein neues Mainz?: Kontroversen um die Gestalt der Stadt nach 1945 (in German). Walter de Gruyter GmbH & Co KG. pp. 249–250. ISBN 978-3-11-041480-6. Archived from the original on 9 September 2020.
- Metzendorf, Rainer (2012) [2011/12]. "Egon Hartmann und das neue Mainz" (PDF). Mainzer Zeitschrift, Mittelrheinisches Jahrbuch für Archäologie, Kunst und Geschichte. 106/107: 309–326. Archived (PDF) from the original on 4 August 2018.
- Metzendorf, Rainer; Sebald, Eduard (21 October 2019). Egon Hartmann und der Wiederaufbau von Mainz (PDF) (1. Auflage ed.). Berlin: Gebr. Mann Verlag. ISBN 978-3-7861-2842-7. OCLC 1124998625. Archived (PDF) from the original on 12 July 2020.
- Wolfrum, Sophie (April 2010). "Egon Hartmann | 1919–2009". Bauwelt (in German). Archived from the original on 9 September 2020.
- "Landtagsgebäude". Thüringer Landtag (in German). Archived from the original on 13 May 2020.
