= Deutsche Volkszeitung (1945) =

Former daily newspaper in Germany

- Cover of the 15 October 1945 issue of Deutsche Volkszeitung
- Type: Daily
- Editor-in-chief: Paul Wandel; Sepp Schwab
- Founded: 13 June 1945
- Ceased publication: 21 April 1946
- Political alignment: Communist Party of Germany
- Language: German
- Headquarters: Berlin
- Circulation: 350,000 (October 1945)
- OCLC number: 29607627

Deutsche Volkszeitung ('German People's Newspaper', abbreviated DVZ) was a newspaper published daily from Berlin, Germany between 1945–1946. It was the organ of the Central Committee of the Communist Party of Germany (KPD).

== Foundation ==
The first issue was published on 13 June 1945. Deutsche Volkszeitung was the first "working-class newspaper" to emerge in Berlin after the Second World War. Its circulation at this point was 100,000 copies.

== Wandel's editorship ==
Paul Wandel, who had returned from exile in Moscow on 10 June 1945, was named editor-in-chief of the newspaper. According to a 1989 interview with Wandel, the decision to launch Deutsche Volkszeitung had been taken during a conversation between Joseph Stalin and German communist leaders just a few days earlier. Wandel had been proposed by Walter Ulbricht as the editor-in-chief of the new publication. During this period Deutsche Volkszeitung was the sole newspaper published in the Soviet occupation zone not subject to SMAD censorship. Wandel withdrew from the post on 24 July 1945. Sepp Schwab became the new editor-in-chief of the newspaper.

== Siemens controversy ==
In the summer of 1945 Deutsche Volkszeitung ran a number of articles about anti-fascist resistance in the concentration camps during the war. An article in the 5 August 1945 issue of the newspaper claimed that Siemens had produced and installed the crematoria and gas chambers at Auschwitz. Siemens denied the claim, contracted a lawyer and threatened legal actions against the newspaper. Deutsche Volkszeitung repeated the claim in its 22 August 1945 issue. Siemens Chairman Wolf-Dietrich von Witzleben then responded by writing to Lewis Lyne, Commandant of the British Sector in Berlin, asking him to take action against the newspaper. Witzleben was arrested twice by Allied troops following the Deutsche Volkszeitung articles.

== Merger with Das Volk ==
By October 1946 the newspaper reached a daily circulation of 350,000 copies. The final issue of Deutsche Volkszeitung was published on 21 April 1946. On 23 April 1946, the newspaper was replaced by Neues Deutschland (organ of the Socialist Unity Party of Germany, SED), founded as a result of the merger of Deutsche Volkszeitung and the SPD organ Das Volk. During the merger talks between SPD and KPD the idea of making Deutsche Volkszeitung as the 'national organ' of SED had been discussed (whilst making Das Volk the Berlin local organ of the party). On 25 April 1946 the SED leadership named Sepp Schwab co-editor-in-chief of Neues Deutschland.
