= Albert Hinrich Hussmann =

German sculptor

Albert Heinrich Hussmann
- Albert Hinrich Hußmann
- Born: 3 March 1874; Cuxhaven, Germany
- Died: 15 November 1946 (aged 72); Furstenberg, Germany
- Education: Academy of Fine Arts in Berlin
- Known for: Horse and rider statues
- Notable work: Grazing horse
- Spouse: Wally Hussmann
- Awards: Golden Medal of Art (1914)

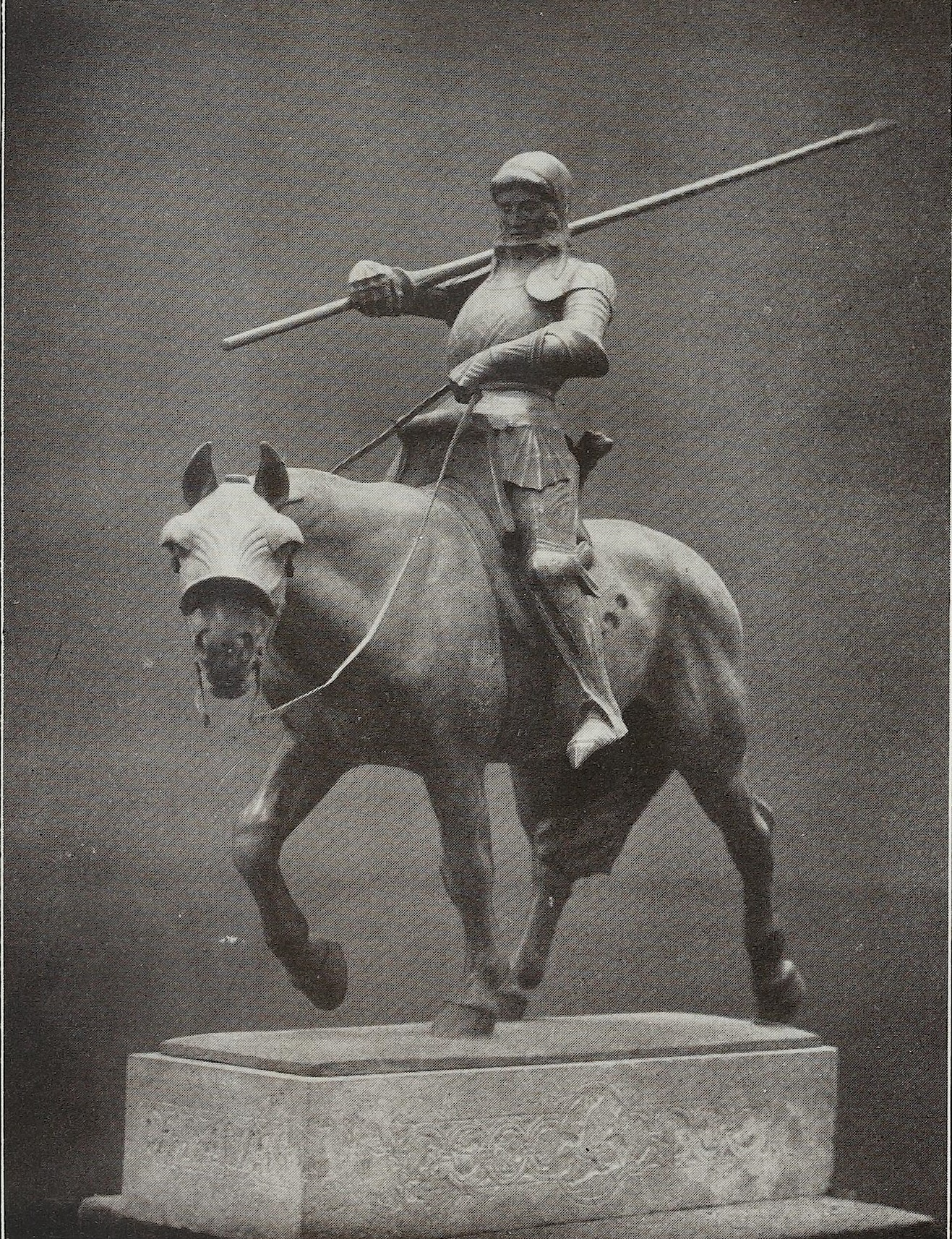
Parzifal by Albert Hinrich Hußmann

Albert Hinrich Hussmann (1874–1946) was a German artist and sculptor specializing in horse and rider statues.

Hussmann was born on 3 March 1874 in Cuxhaven, Germany. He studied at the Academy of Fine Arts in Berlin. His statues were featured several times in the Great Berlin Art Exhibition. Hussmann designed pieces for the Bavarian porcelain company Rosenthal from 1909 through 1943.

Hussmann died on 15 November 1946 in Lüdingworth, Germany.
