= Karl-Marx-Allee =

Street in Berlin, Germany

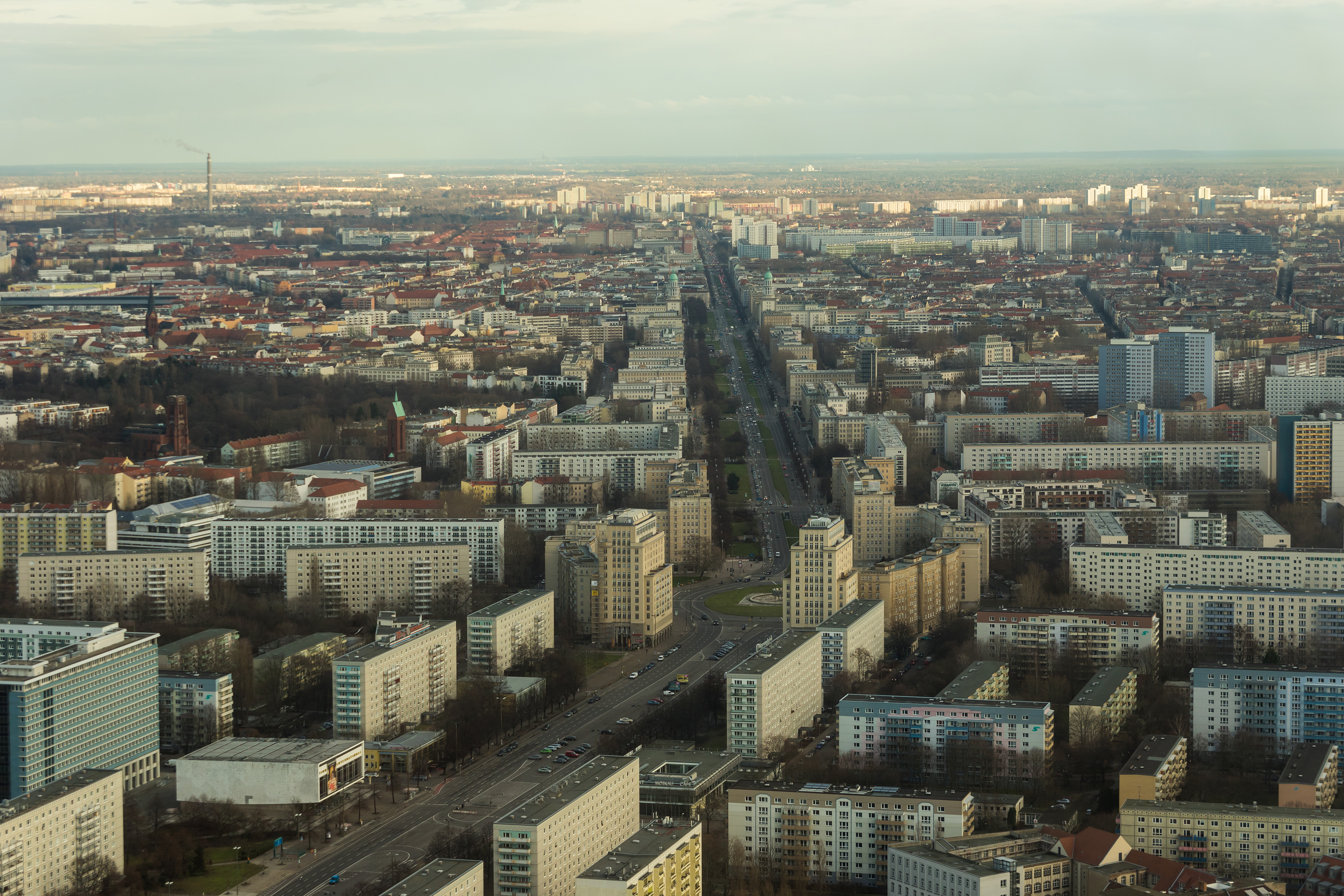
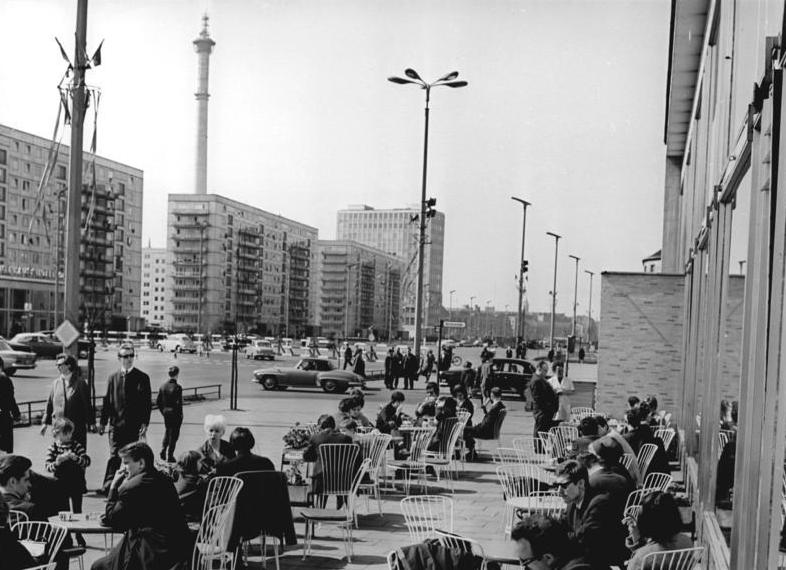
- Aerial view of Karl-Marx-Allee with the twin towers of Frankfurter Tor in the background The western part of the boulevard is marked by panel buildings (1967)
- Interactive map of Karl-Marx-Allee
- Former names: Full length: Frankfurter Straße; (c. 1701–before 1786); Große Frankfurter Straße; (before 1786–1872); Main part: Große Frankfurter Straße; (1872–1949); Weberwiese to east end: Frankfurter Allee; (1872–1949); Full current length: Stalinallee; (1949–1961)
- Part of: Bundesstraße 1; Bundesstraße 5
- Namesake: Karl Marx
- Type: Boulevard
- Length: 2.3 km (1.4 mi)
- Width: 90 m (300 ft)
- Location: Berlin, Germany
- Quarter: Mitte, Friedrichshain
- Nearest metro station: Alexanderplatz; Schillingstraße; Strausberger Platz; Weberwiese; Frankfurter Tor
- Coordinates: 52°31′04″N 13°26′07″E
- West end: Alexanderstraße; Alexanderplatz; Otto-Braun-Straße
- Major junctions: Schillingstraße; Berolinastraße; Strausberger Platz; Lichtenberger Straße; Andreasstraße; Lebuser Straße; Koppenstraße; Straße der Pariser Kommune
- East end: Frankfurter Tor; Warschauer Straße; Petersburger Straße; Frankfurter Allee

Karl-Marx-Allee (Karl Marx Avenue) is a prominent boulevard in the Berlin districts of Friedrichshain and Mitte, constructed and expanded by the former East Germany between 1949 and 1960 as a showcase of socialist urbanism and architectural grandeur. Originally named Stalinallee from 1949 to 1961, the boulevard formed the centrepiece of the German Democratic Republic's (GDR) postwar reconstruction efforts. It was conceived as a model of dignified workers' housing and civic life, designed by leading architects including Hermann Henselmann, Egon Hartmann, Hans Hopp, Kurt W. Leucht, Richard Paulick and Josef Souradny. The ensemble featured spacious residences, cultural institutions such as the Kino International, as well as restaurants, cafés, and a tourist hotel. These developments were emblematic of East Germany's ideological ambition to "elevate the proletariat" through state-led urban planning.

Stretching 2.3 kilometres (1.4 mi) and spanning 90 metres (300 ft) in width, Karl-Marx-Allee is lined with imposing eight-storey buildings rendered in the wedding-cake style of socialist classicism, reflecting the stylistic idiom of Stalinist architecture then prevalent in the Soviet Union. Notable landmarks include the twin towers at Frankfurter Tor and Strausberger Platz, both designed by Henselmann. The boulevard blends grandeur with local heritage, incorporating traditional Berlin motifs inspired by Karl Friedrich Schinkel, while façades were clad in ornate architectural ceramics. Though subject to decay by the late 1980s—with many tiles falling off, necessitating pedestrian shelters in some areas, the avenue remained widely admired. Philip Johnson referred to it as "true city planning on the grand scale," while Aldo Rossi declared it "Europe's last great street."

The avenue played a symbolic role in key historical events. On 17 June 1953, it became the focal point of the 1953 workers' uprising, when construction workers protested against the state's increased work quotas and sparked a broader rebellion that was ultimately suppressed by Soviet forces, resulting in numerous casualties. A monumental Stalin statue had been installed in 1951 by a Komsomol delegation to honour the Third World Festival of Youth and Students, but it was quietly dismantled in 1961 during the process of de-Stalinization. That same year, the street was renamed after Karl Marx, aligning the public space with a more ideologically durable figure. In subsequent decades, the boulevard became the setting for East Germany's elaborate May Day parades, featuring military hardware and choreographed displays that affirmed state power. The legacy of Karl-Marx-Allee remains a subject of debate in reunified Germany, with occasional suggestions to restore its former name, Große Frankfurter Straße. However, this name referred to a different street in the area before World War II, and such proposals have neither gained widespread support nor been implemented.

== Commerce ==
The boulevard developed into a commerce-centre in the GDR. It also served the ideological function of introducing visitors to the culture of its "socialist sister states". Commerce was a mixed experience for visitors from the West. Most stores would not accept payment for purchased items without a receipt from an East German bank showing that the West German Marks had been exchanged for East German Marks at a rate of 1:1. In the West, the exchange rate was 1:8 but most restaurants and bookstores were not concerned with these requirements so bargains were to be found.

== "Stalin's bathroom" ==
In February 2009, an anonymous author edited the article "Karl-Marx-Allee" in the German-language edition of Wikipedia, claiming that during the time of the GDR the road had acquired the nickname "Stalin's bathroom" due to the buildings' tiled façades. Subsequently, several media outlets reiterated this claim. No alternative verification for the term was given, making it a self-referential claim.

After a letter written to the Berliner Zeitung questioned whether the term "Stalin's bathroom" had actually been in common use during the GDR period, Andreas Kopietz, a journalist at the newspaper, published an article admitting he had invented the phrase and identifying himself as the original anonymous Wikipedia editor, allowing the record to be set straight.

== In popular media ==
The boulevard is referenced under its former name, the Stalinallee, in the satirical poem "Die Lösung" by Bertolt Brecht about the East German uprising of 1953.

== Photographs ==
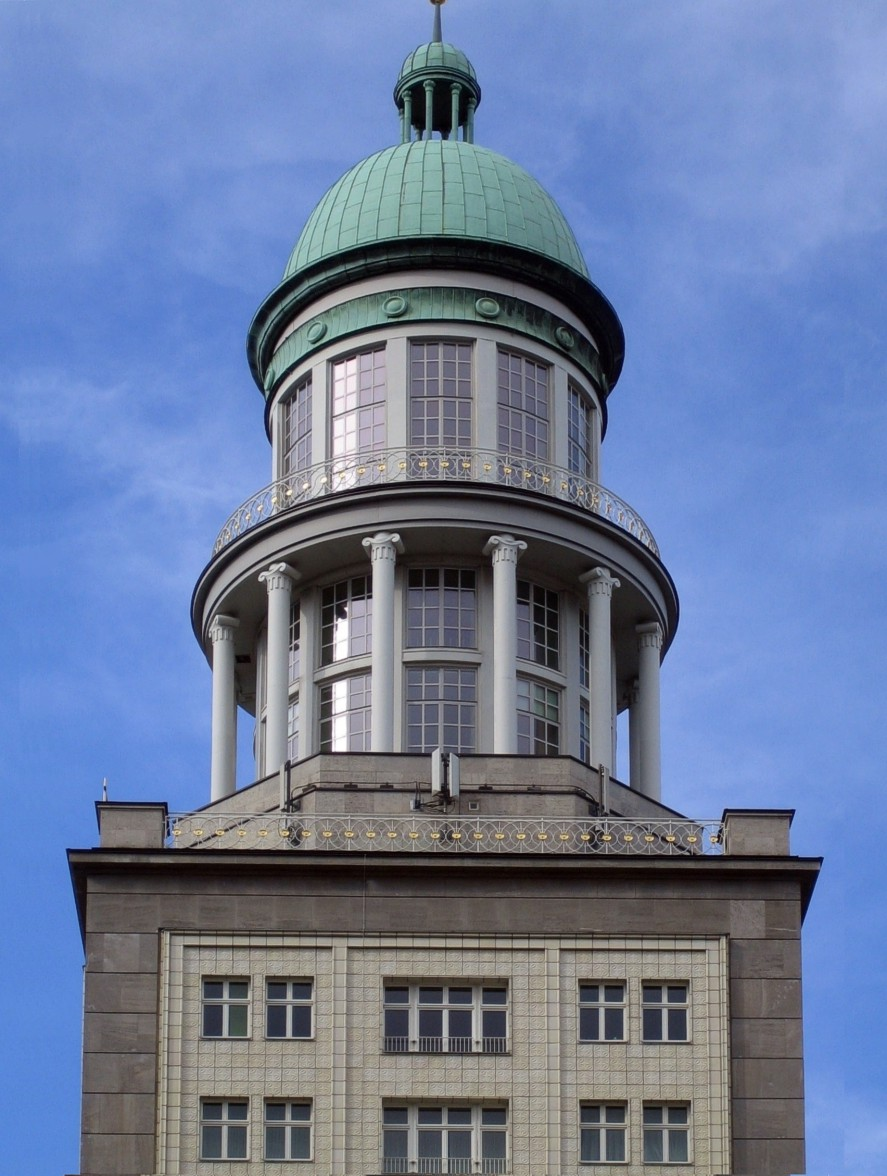
Domed tower at Frankfurter Tor

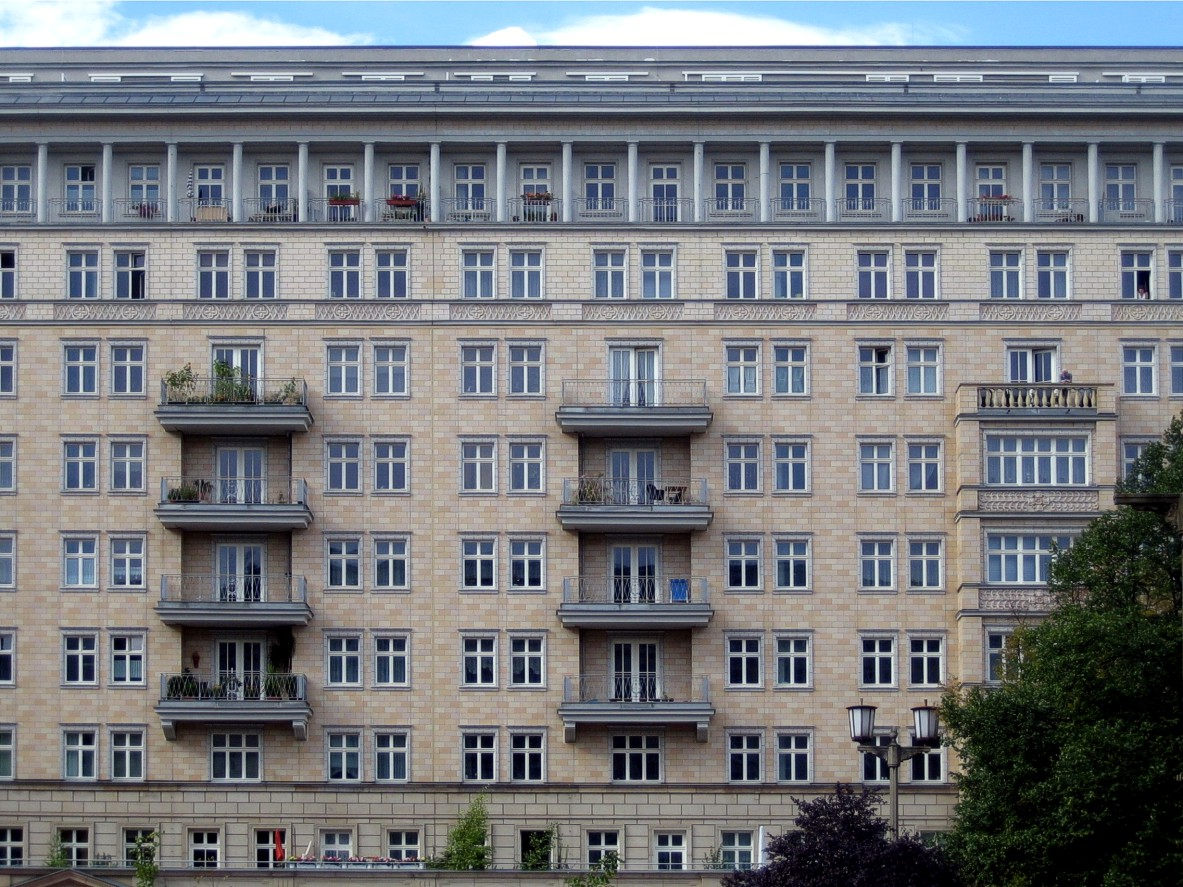
Façade of a Stalinist-era apartment block

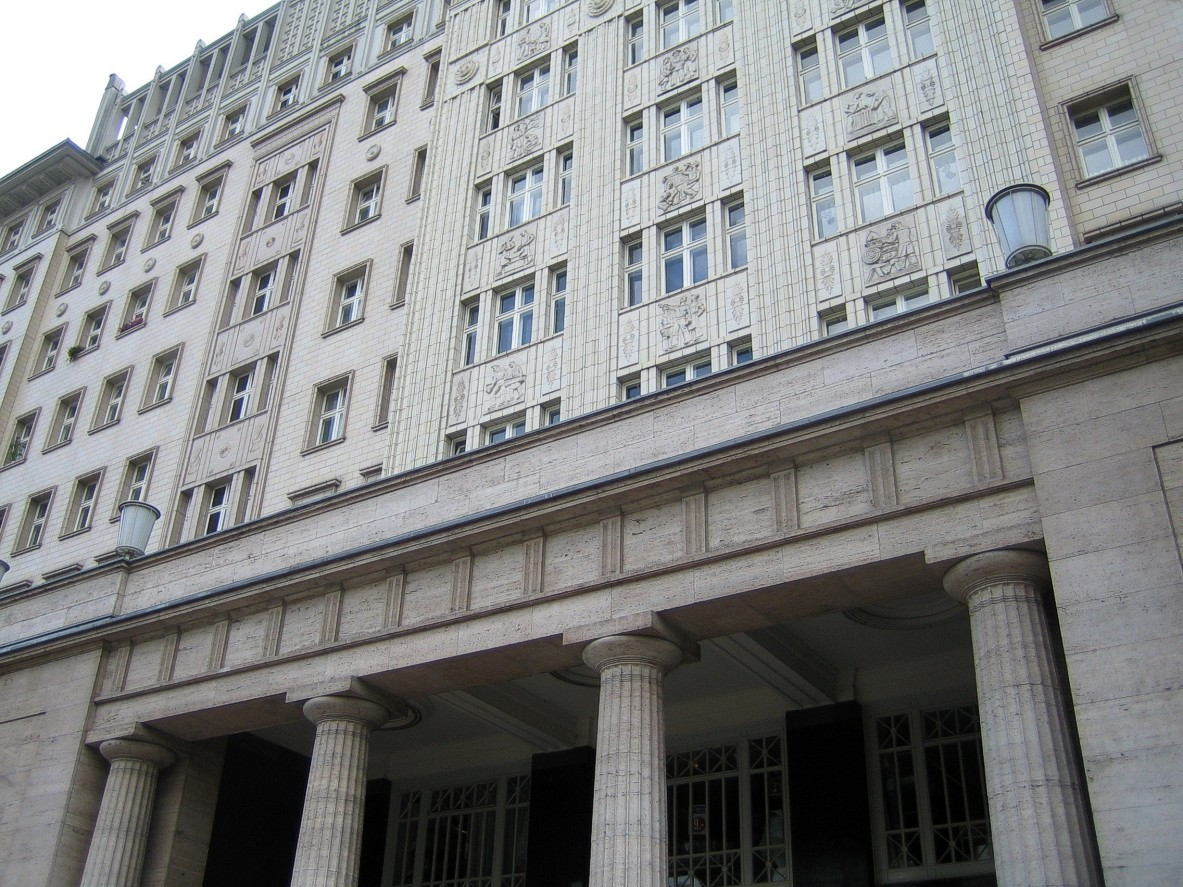
Façade of a Stalinist-era apartment block

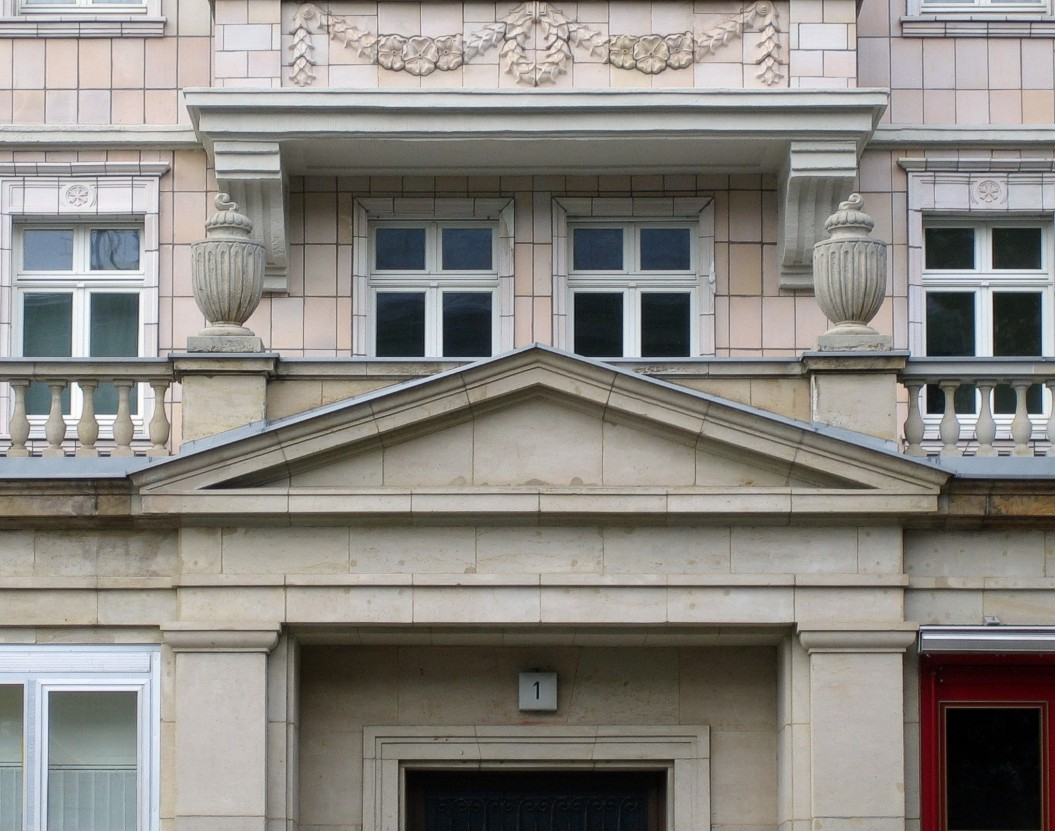
Façade detail

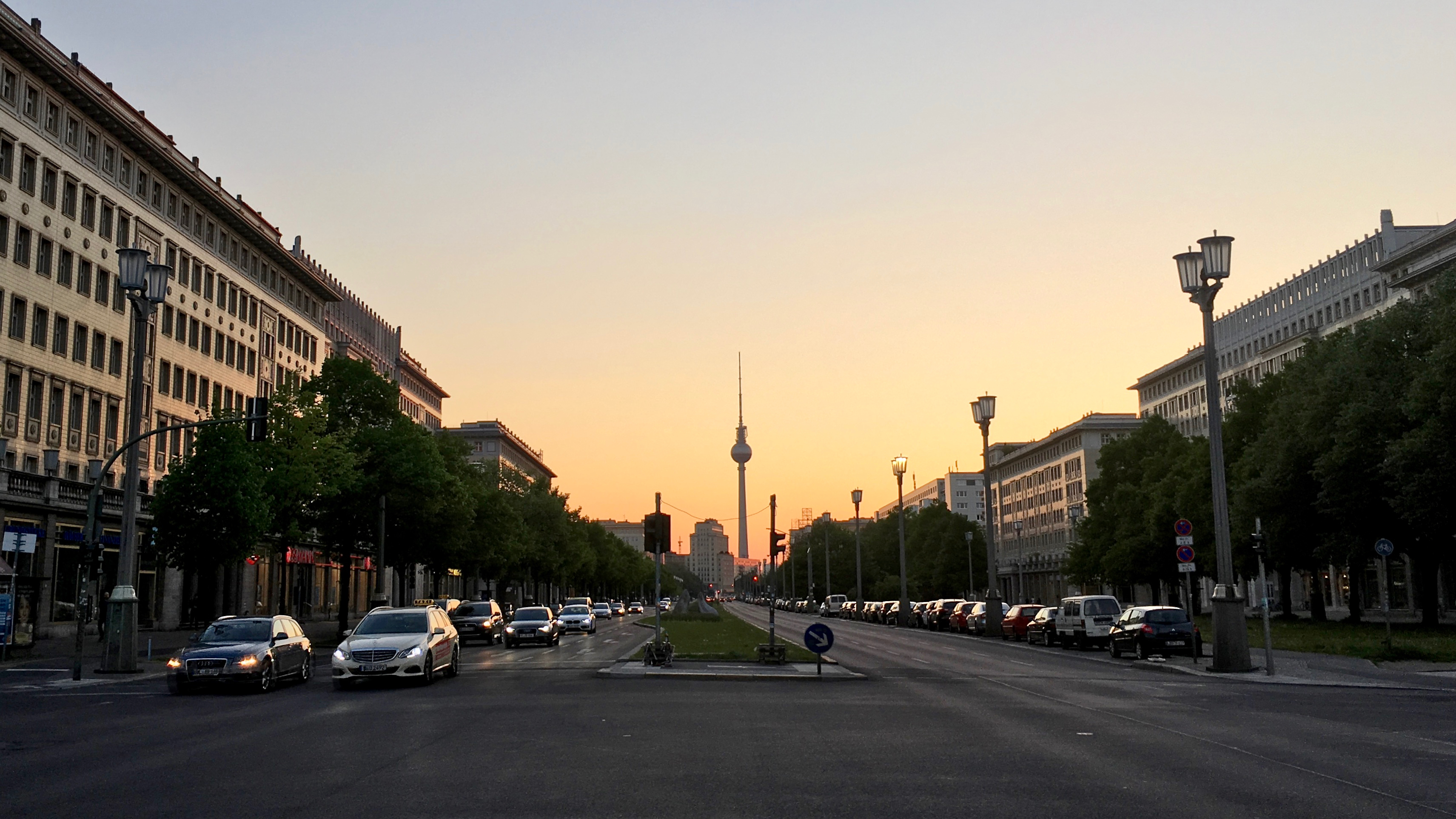
Karl-Marx-Allee looking towards the Berlin TV Tower.

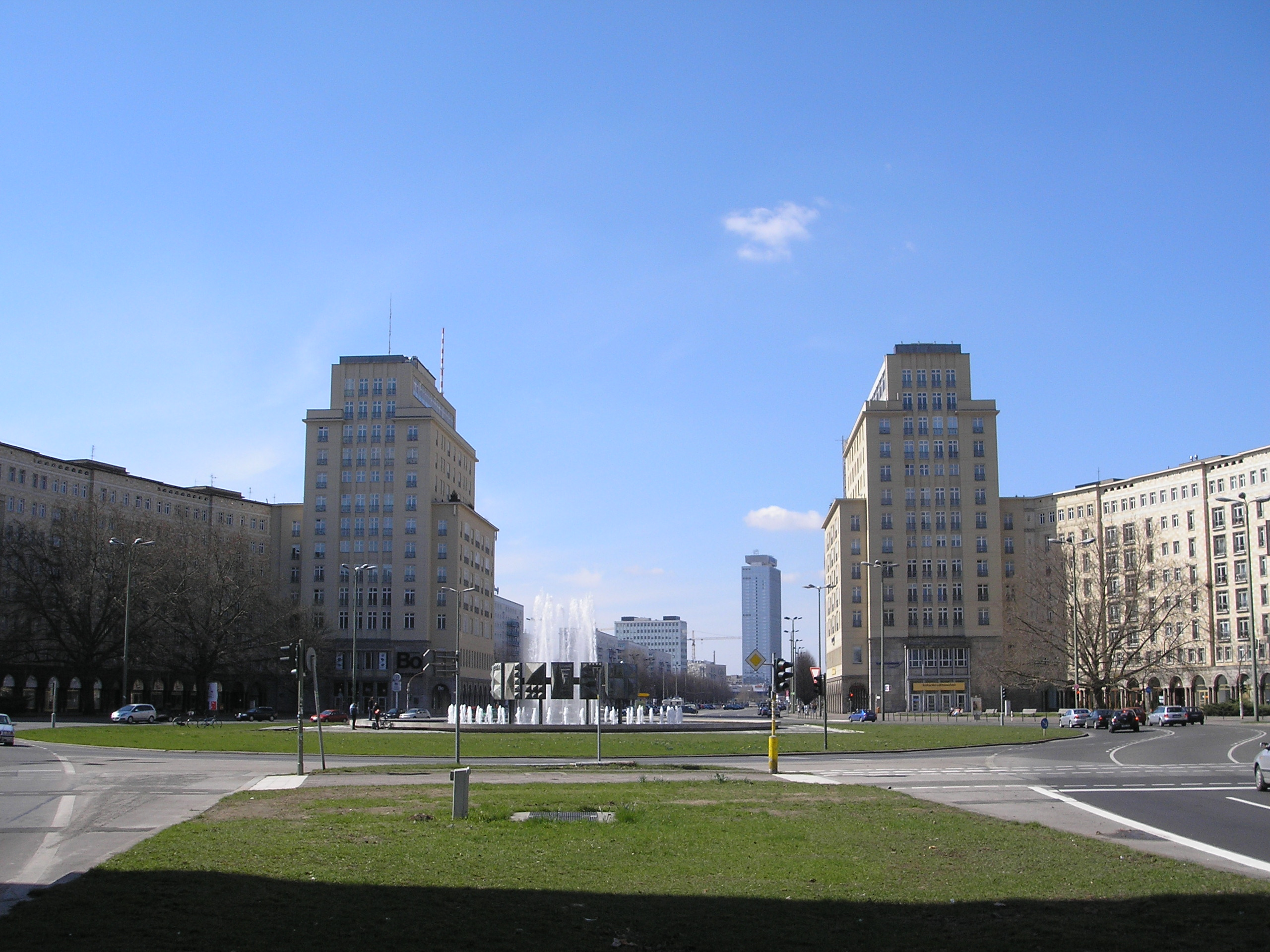
Strausberger Platz, near the western end of the boulevard

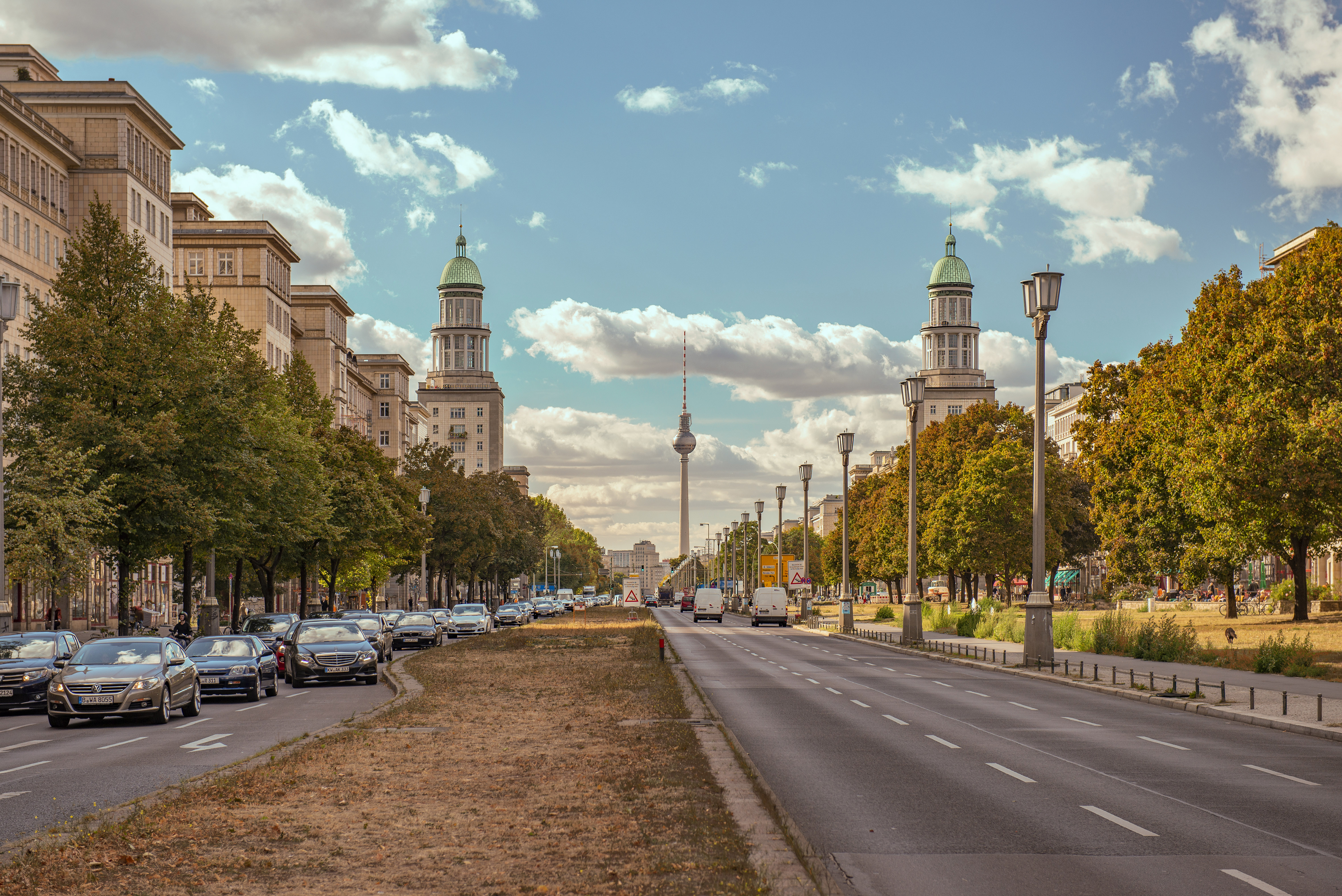
Karl-Marx-Allee with Frankfurter Tor and Television Tower

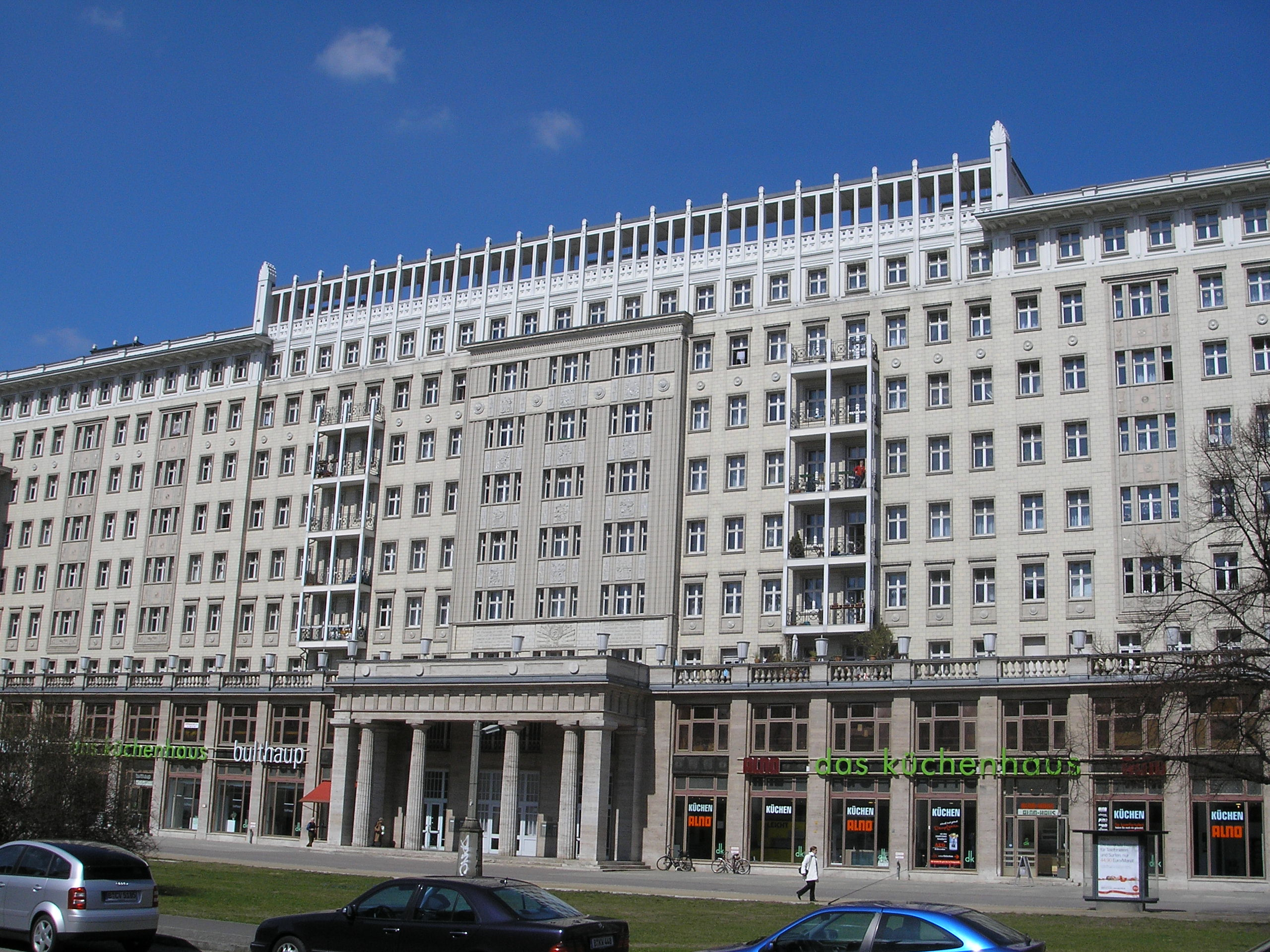
Closeup of a Stalinist-era building

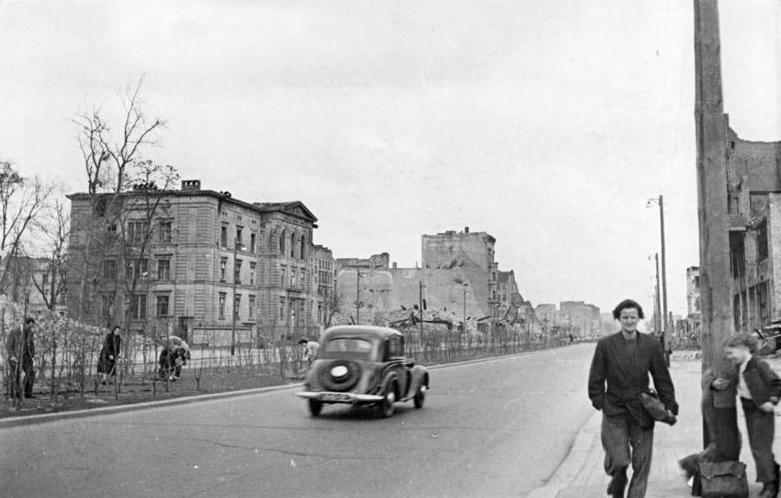
Stalinallee, 1950

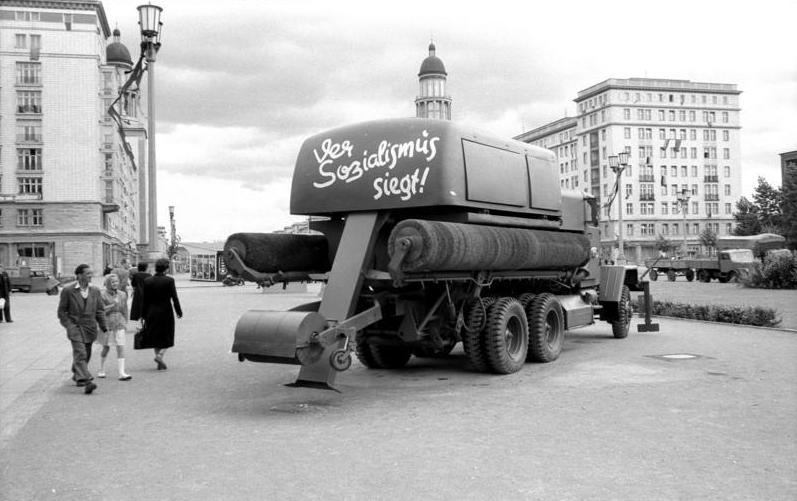
Stalinallee, 1959

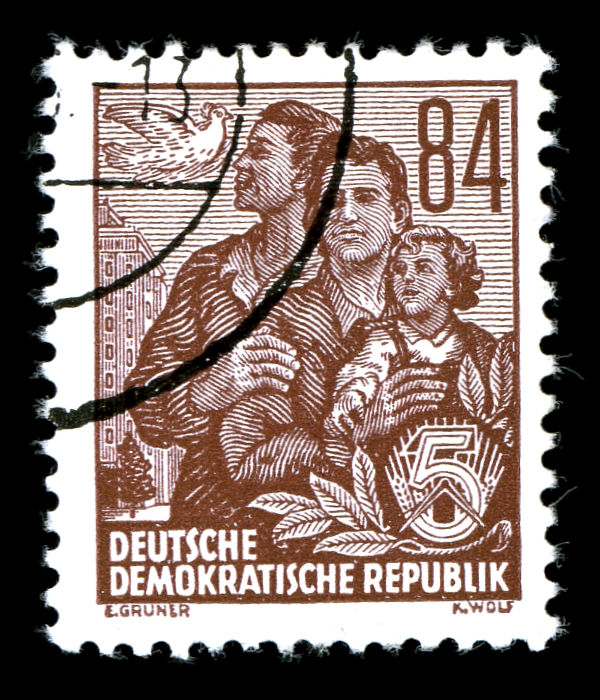
"5-year Plan" postage stamp series, 1953: A family standing before a high-rise near the Weberwiese subway station

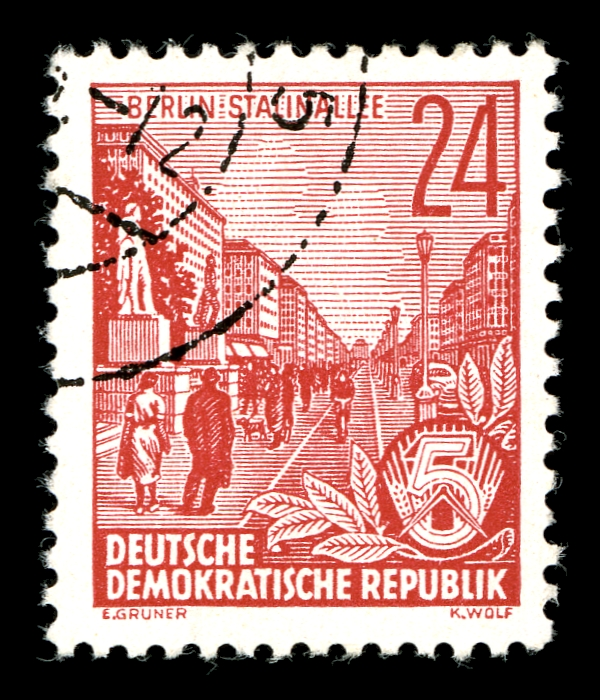
Berlin, Stalinallee

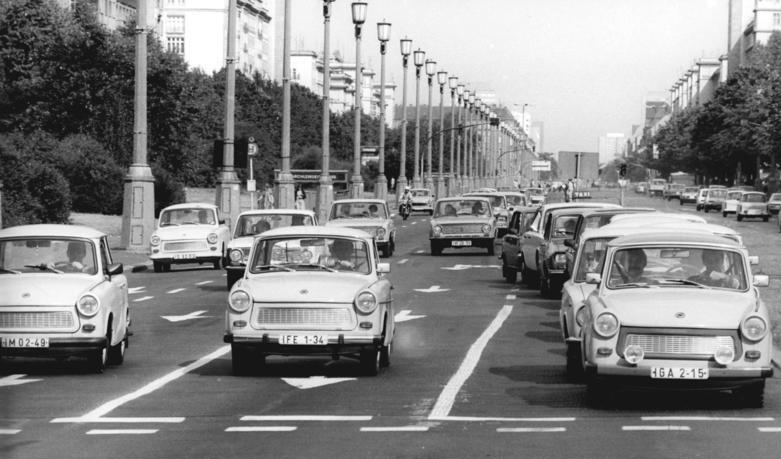
Trabants on Karl-Marx-Allee

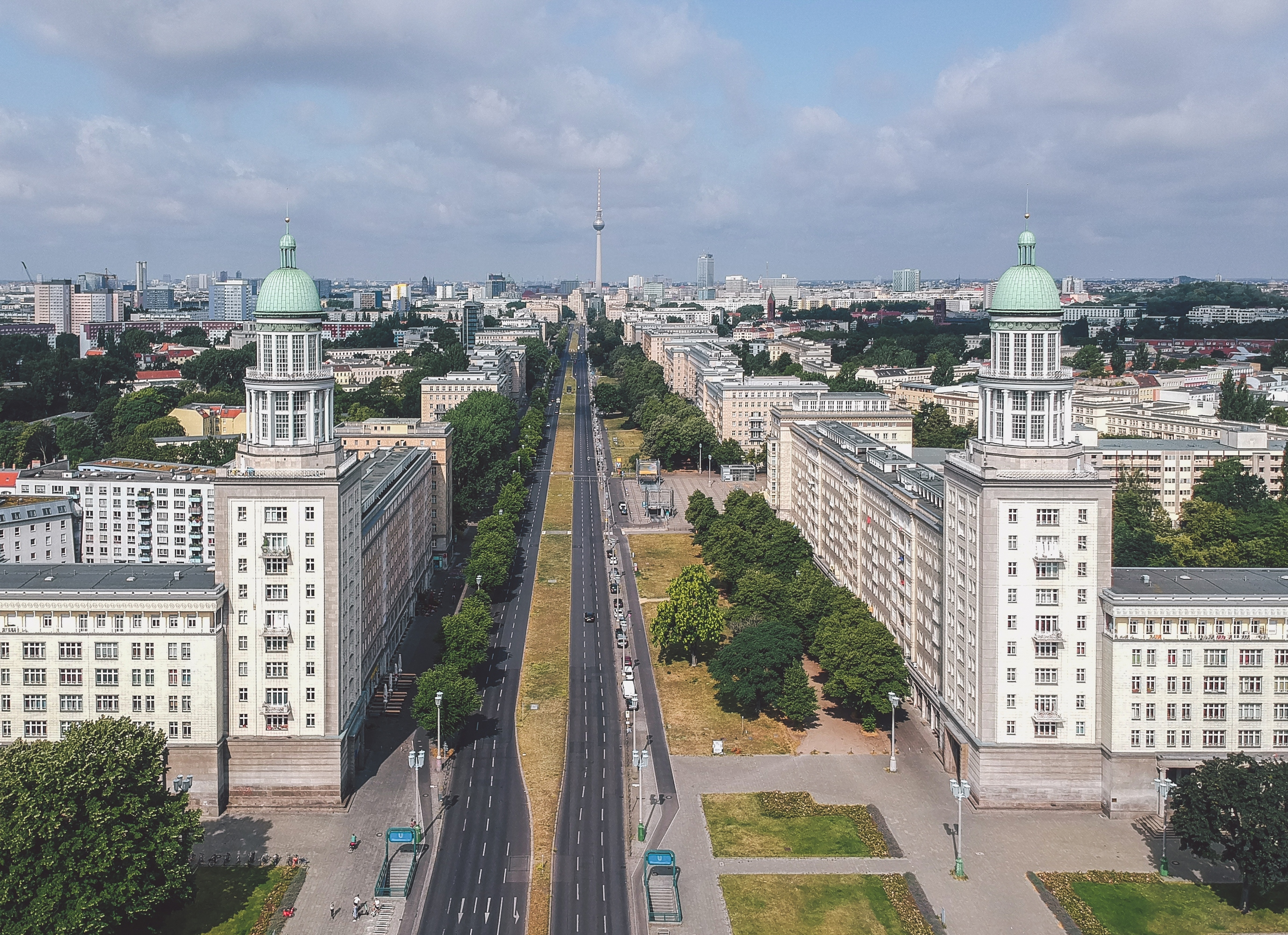
Aerial view over Karl-Marx-Allee, 2019

== See also ==
- Stalinist architecture
- Seven Sisters (Moscow)
- The Straße der Pariser Kommune ("Street of the Paris Commune") connects with Karl-Marx-Allee
