= Strausberger Platz =

Urban square in Berlin, Germany

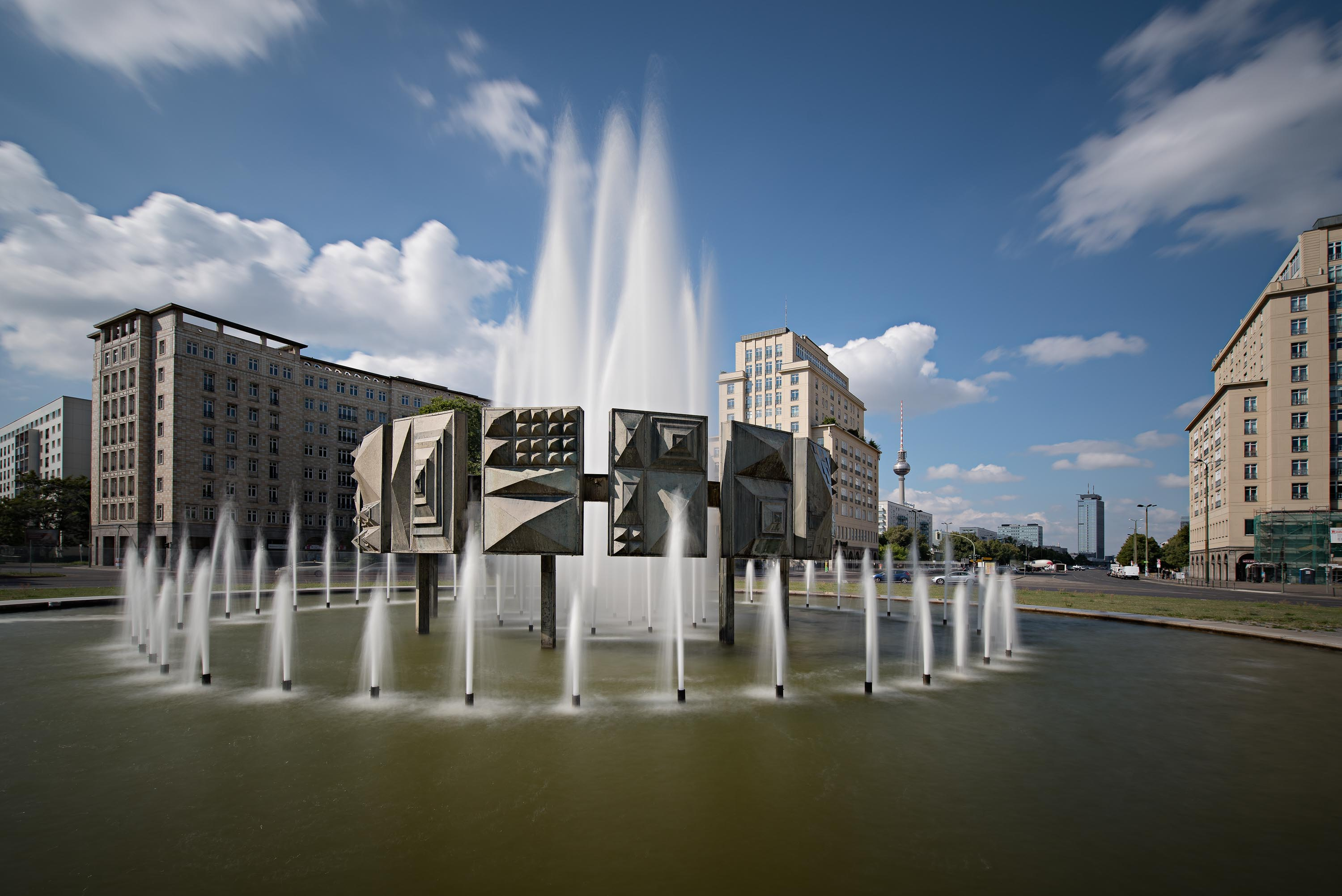
- Fountain in Strausberger Platz
- Interactive map of Strausberger Platz
- Part of: Bundesstraße 1; Bundesstraße 5
- Namesake: Strausberg
- Type: Public square
- Location: Berlin, Germany
- Quarter: Friedrichshain
- Nearest metro station: Strausberger Platz
- Coordinates: 52°31′07″N 13°25′42″E
- Major junctions: Karl-Marx-Allee; Lichtenberger Straße

Construction
- Inauguration: 1967

The Strausberger Platz is a large urban square in the Berlin district of Friedrichshain-Kreuzberg and marks the border to the district of Mitte. It is connected via Karl-Marx-Allee with Alexanderplatz and via Lichtenberger Straße with the Platz der Vereinten Nationen. These two streets intersect in an oval roundabout at Strausberger Platz.

== History ==
The square was the starting point for the East German uprising of 1953, when DDR wanted to increase the 'working norm' making workers work longer for the same pay.

== Gallery ==
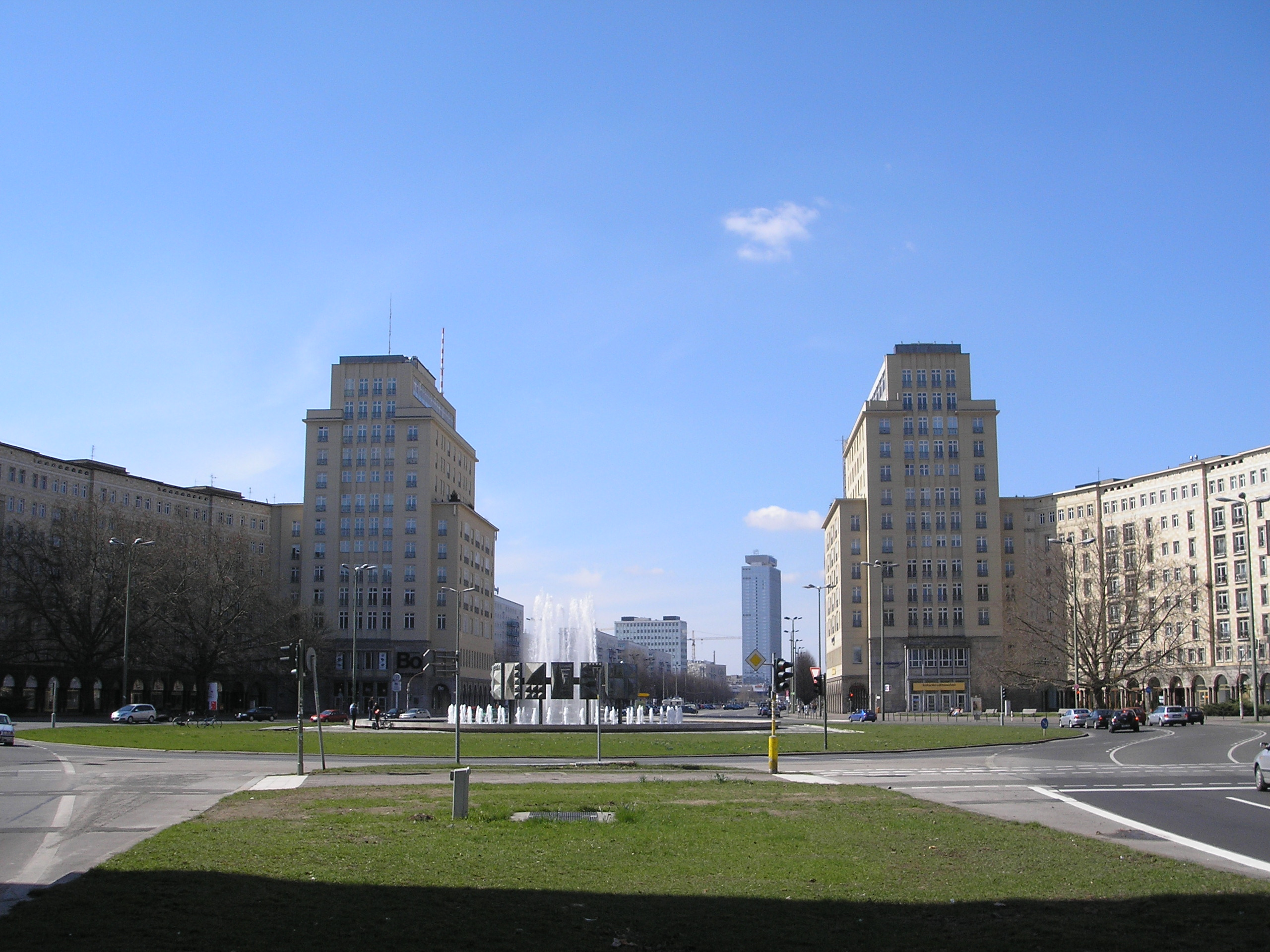

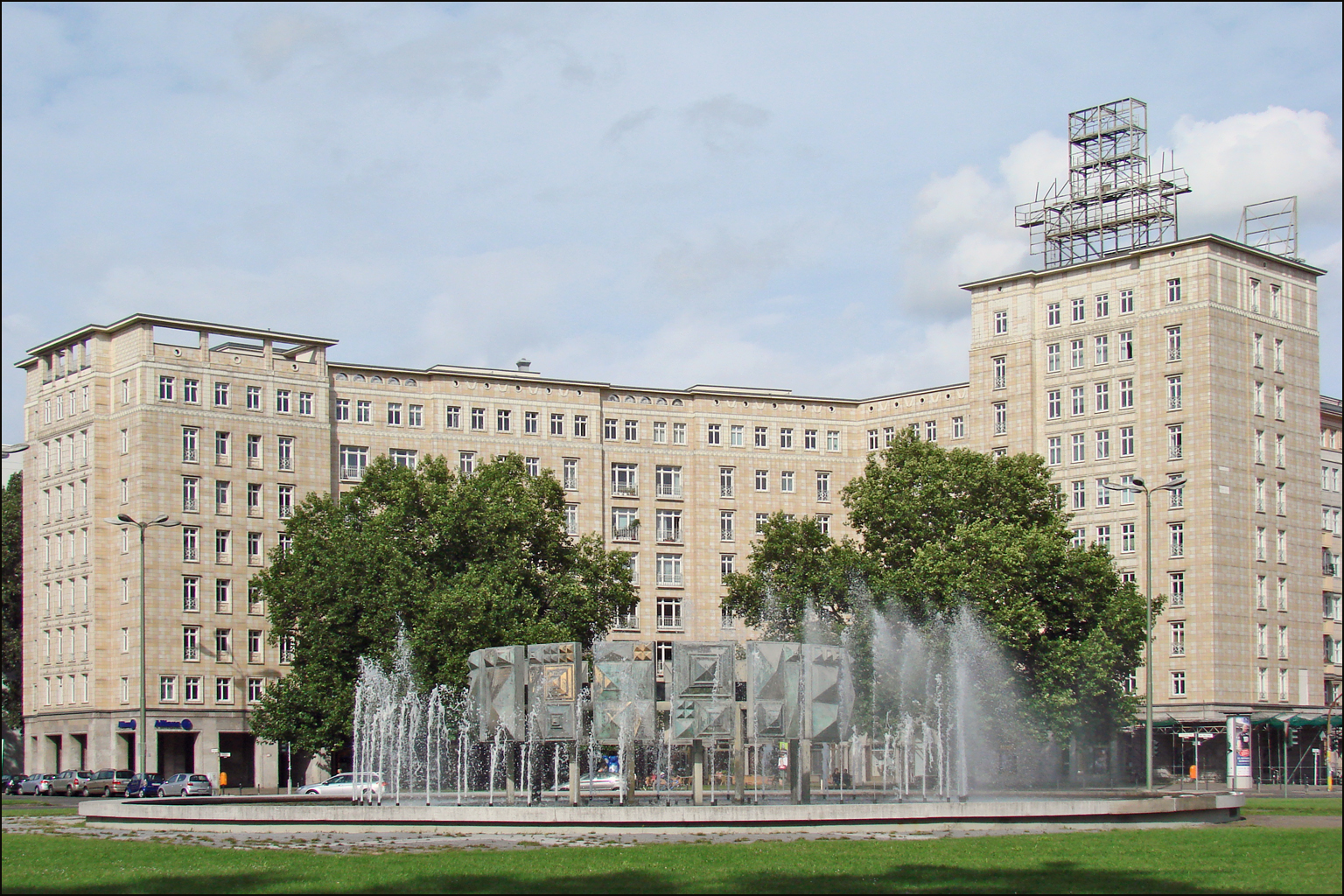

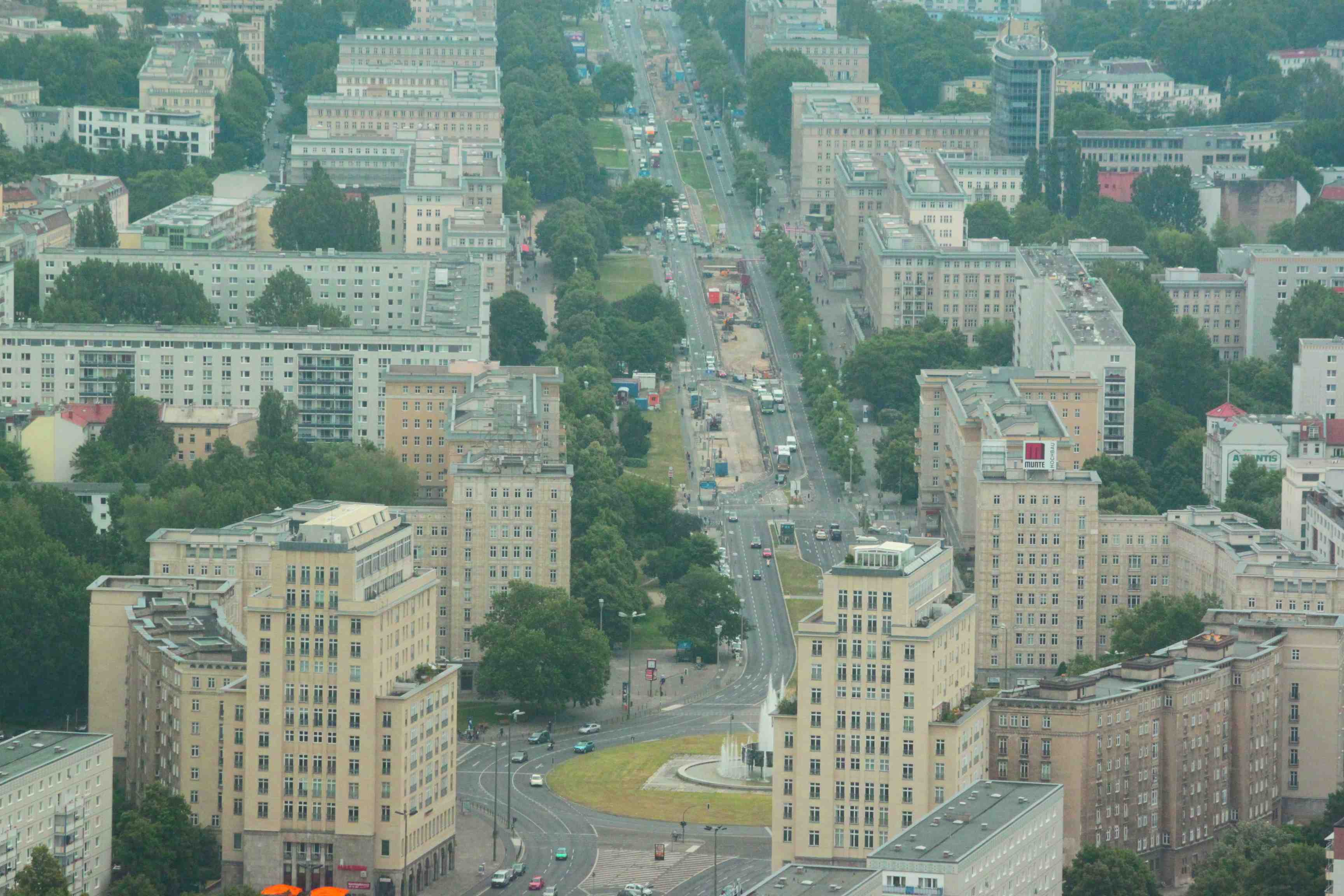
