= Das Volk (1945) =

German social democratic newspaper (1945–46)

- Cover of Das Volk, 15 July 1945 edition
- Type: Daily newspaper
- Founded: 7 July 1945
- Ceased publication: April 1946
- Political alignment: Social Democratic Party of Germany
- Language: German
- Headquarters: Behrenstrasse, Berlin
- Circulation: 250,000 (January 1946)
- OCLC number: 183395573

Das Volk (pronounced [das fɔlk], "The People") was a daily newspaper published from Berlin, Germany. It was the central organ of the Social Democratic Party of Germany (SPD). The first issue of Das Volk was published on 7 July 1945. Das Volk was the second "working-class newspaper" to emerge in Berlin after the Second World War — the first having been the Communist Party of Germany (KPD) organ Deutsche Volkszeitung. During its first twenty days of publishing, Das Volk was printed in Berliner format (a relatively small format at the time). Das Volk heeded the KPD's calls for building an anti-fascist democratic Germany, a parliamentary democratic republic, and unity of the working class. The newspaper was controlled by the left-wing tendency inside the SPD, and supported merger of the party with the KPD.

Otto Meier (politician) was the editor-in-chief. At first, the deputy editor-in-chief was Engelberg Graf, but the Soviet authorities objected to Graf's presence and he was subsequently removed from this post. Max Nierich and Paul Ufermann were later named as deputy editors. In its initial period Das Volk had a circulation of 50,000-100,000 copies. By September 1945 the circulation reached 150,000, and by January 1946 the circulation stood at 250,000.

The paper's editorial offices were inside SPD party headquarters on Behrenstrasse in East Berlin. Meier wanted to move the editorial offices to West Berlin, but this was allegedly blocked by the Soviet authorities.

On 23 April 1946, in the wake of the SPD merging with the KPD to form the Socialist Unity Party of Germany (SED), Das Volk merged with Deutsche Volkszeitung to become the SED organ Neues Deutschland. During the SPD-KPD merger talks the idea of continuing publication of Das Volk had been discussed, but only as a local organ of the SED in Berlin. On 25 April 1946, the SED leadership named Max Nierich co-editor-in-chief of Neues Deutschland.
