= Renate Holub =

German philosopher (born 1946)

Renate Holub (born 6 October 1946) is a German political philosopher and critical social theorist living in California. She has published several books.

== Life ==
Holub was born in Ludwigshafen am Rhein. After studying in Paris, Madrid, London and Rome she received advanced degrees at the University of Wisconsin–Madison(USA). Her dissertation focused on the Italian enlightenment philosopher Giambattista Vico. She has also published a study of the Italian Marxist Antonio Gramsci, entitled Antonio Gramsci: Beyond Marxism and Postmodernism. (1992) Currently, she lives in the San Francisco area and is Professor and Director of the Interdisciplinary Studies department at the University of California, Berkeley. Her research has focused on "Intellectuals, Rights, and States" in a variety of global regions of both developed and developing economies.
