= German Association for Housing, Urban and Spatial Development =

German think tank

The German Association for Housing, Urban and Spatial Development (short term German Association, German: Deutscher Verband für Wohnungswesen, Städtebau und Raumordnung) is a politically independent association and registered with an approved non-profit status. It is concerned with key questions and future perspectives of the housing and real estate industry, urban planning and spatial development.

== History ==
The German Association was founded in 1946. Since then, it has been an important player in post-war Germany, being a platform for discussion and exchange, providing the Federal Ministry of Transport, Building and Urban Development and other important institutions with recommendations and shaping the public discourse. Furthermore, it represented the German side on international congresses like the 20th International congress for housing and urban planning, hosted in 1950 in Amsterdam by the International Association for housing and urban planning which proves its long history as exchange and dissemination point, unifying various points of view within the range of German housing and planning institutions.

== Purpose ==
The German Association has gained experience in horizontal and vertical cross-sector communication. For about 15 years it has also acquired knowledge in transnational co-operation, especially within projects that are funded within the framework of the territorial agenda of the European Union and has acted as lead partner several times. It is partner of various projects in the field of housing, urban and spatial planning. The German association develops recommendations regarding legislation and practice within its own commissions and working groups. According to its history, it sees itself as an independent know how exchange platform and a clearing agent of the federal Ministry of Transport, Building and Urban Development and other related associations. With its branch office in Brussels the German Association is closely connected to other EU institutions and disseminates project results.

== Members ==
Municipalities, associations, research institutes, credit institutions and other companies, politicians as well as individuals are members of the German association.

== Organization ==
The managing committee consists of:

- the honorary presidents Irene Wiese-von Ofen and Karl Ravens,
- the president Jürgen Heyer
- the vice-presidents Josef Meyer and Helmut Rausch
- the bursar Axel Vogt as well as the other members
- Axel Gedaschko, Hartwig Hamm, Norbert Portz, Franz-Georg Rips and Oda Scheibelhuber.

Another board is the Associations council, which is chaired by the president of the association, Jürgen Heyer.
