= Badisches Volksecho =

German newspaper

- Type: Weekly
- Founded: 1946
- Ceased publication: August 11, 1956
- Political alignment: Communist
- Language: German language
- Headquarters: Stuttgart; Mannheim
- Circulation: ~16,000 (1955)
- OCLC number: 310959936

Badisches Volksecho ('Baden People's Echo') was a German-language weekly newspaper. It was published from Stuttgart, West Germany, between April 1946 and March 1947. Later it was published from Mannheim, Karlsruhe, and Stuttgart, West Germany, between April, 1947 to August 11, 1956. It was published by the regional organization of the Communist Party of Germany in Württemberg-Baden. Albeit initially planned as an organ for northern Baden, it became distributed in the French occupation zone as well after the banning of the south Baden organ Unser Tag.

On August 12, 1950 publishing of Badisches Volksecho was suspended by the U.S. military authorities for a period of 90 days, for having printed material deemed 'prejudicial to the prestige of the Allied forces'.

As of 1955, the newspaper had a circulation of around 16,000. Badisches Volkecho was banned in 1956.
