= Sozialistische Einheit (Berlin) =

Old newspaper published from Germany

- Type: Twice-weekly
- Founded: 14 March 1946
- Ceased publication: 8 April 1946
- Political alignment: Socialism
- Language: German language
- Headquarters: 35-37 Behrenstrasse, Berlin
- OCLC number: 724456544

Sozialistische Einheit ('Socialist Unity') was a newspaper published from Berlin, Germany in 1946. The newspaper began publishing twice-weekly on 14 March 1946. It newspaper was issued by the Greater Berlin Organization Committee of Social Democratic Party of Germany (SPD) and the Communist Party of Germany (KPD). The editorial office of Sozialistische Einheit was based in the SPD headquarters on Behrenstrasse in East Berlin.

The ninth and last issue of Sozialistische Einheit was published on 8 April 1946. The daily newspaper Vorwärts-Berliner Volksblatt ('Forward-Berlin People's Newspaper') was set up as a successor of Sozialistische Einheit.
