= Neues Deutschland =

German newspaper

- Type: Daily newspaper (Monday-Saturday)
- Format: Rhenish (between broadsheet and Berliner)
- Publisher: nd.Genossenschaft eG
- Editor-in-chief: Wolfgang Hübner
- Founded: 23 April 1946
- Political alignment: Democratic socialism 1946–1990: Communism; Marxism–Leninism
- Language: German
- Headquarters: Berlin, Germany
- Circulation: 16,028 (Q2, 2022)
- Website: neues-deutschland.de

nd, formerly Neues Deutschland (German pronunciation: [ˈnɔʏəs ˈdɔʏtʃlant], lit. 'New Germany'), is a left-wing German daily newspaper, headquartered in Berlin.

For 43 years it was the official party newspaper of the Socialist Unity Party of Germany (SED), which governed East Germany (officially known as the German Democratic Republic), and as such served as one of the party's most important organs. The Neues Deutschland that existed in East Germany had a circulation of 1.1 million as of 1989 and was the communist party's main way to show citizens its stances and opinions about politics, economics, etc. It was regarded by foreign countries as the communist regime's diplomatic voice.

Since the fall of the Berlin Wall, the Neues Deutschland has lost 99% of its readership and has a circulation of 16,028, as of 2022. Between 2019 and 2020, the number of sold copies and subscriptions declined by 14.8%. Since 1990, the newspaper has changed its political outlook and, now, has a democratic socialist political stance. The newspaper was, both politically and financially, tied to one of its former owners, The Left (Die Linke), which owned the publishing house and printing presses until the end of 2021. Since 2022, the newspaper is published by a cooperative of staff and subscribers and officially named nd.

== East Germany ==
On March 7, 1953, the front page of Neues Deutschland announced that "The heart of the greatest human being of our era, comrade J.W. Stalin, has stopped beating".

ND was formed in 1946 as a "licensed newspaper" (lizenzzeitung) after the Social Democratic Party of Germany (SPD) and the Communist Party of Germany (KPD) were forcibly merged to form the SED in the Soviet occupation zone of Germany. The first edition of ND was published on 23 April 1946 in conjunction with the founding of the SED. ND replaced the SPD organ Das Volk and the KPD organ Deutsche Volkszeitung. Karl Maron was the first chief editor of the daily and served in the post until 1950.

While Neues Deutschland was the SED's Zentralorgan, its journalists were recruited from the party's broad membership.

Before the reunification of Germany in October 1990, ND had a circulation of a million and was second only to the youth newspaper junge Welt in readership. During this period the editor-in-chief of ND was Wolfgang Spickermann. However, it has been claimed that Neues Deutschland failed to reach much of the East German population.

== After reunification ==
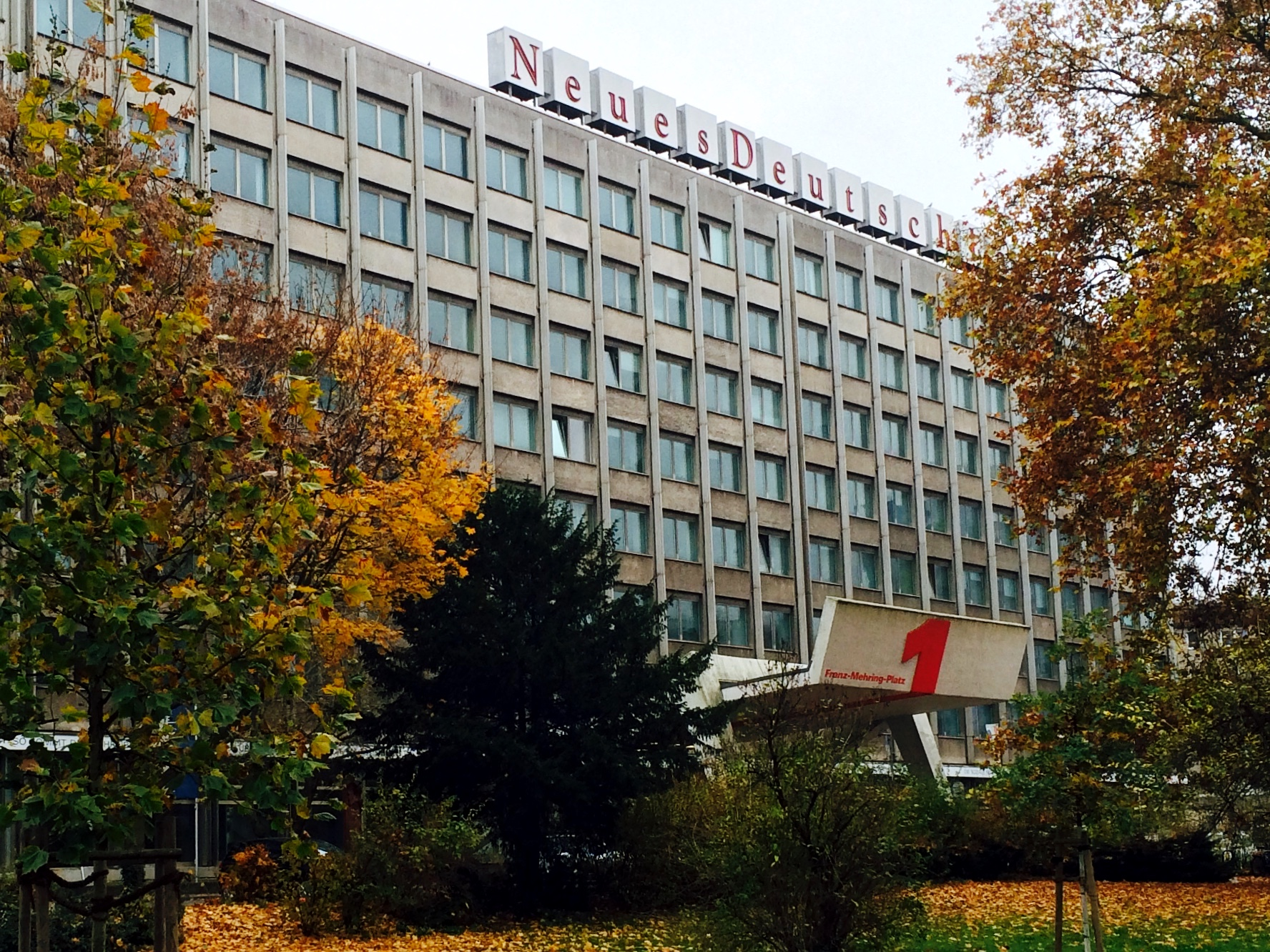
Current editor's office building in Berlin

After reunification, ND's readership diminished greatly. In 2020, ND had a circulation of 18,595. While most large newspapers in Germany have a problem with declining circulation, ND is particularly vulnerable in that the majority of its readers are over 60 years old. ND produces both a national edition and regional editions for Berlin and Brandenburg.

Jürgen Reents, who had political roots in both the Party of Democratic Socialism and the Green Party, became the editor in chief of ND in 1999. One of his major goals was to transform ND's image from a propaganda leaflet to a more respected newspaper. In October 2005 the editors moved from Elsenbrücke to Franz-Mehring Platz in Berlin. Three months later, Olaf Koppe took over management of the newspaper.

Each issue of the daily between 1945 and 1990 was digitalized by the Berlin State Library in June 2013.

=== Profile ===
ND is now oriented towards a democratic socialist viewpoint and was owned partially by the political party The Left, a direct descendant of the SED. The twin goals of the newspaper are to give those in eastern Germany a voice and to represent the democratic socialist viewpoint without being the organ of The Left or any other political party. While eastern German themes dominate the features and the community pages, the political section looks at leftist politics throughout Germany. Authors and politicians from diverse political backgrounds have also been represented on the pages of the newspaper. For example, Friedrich Schorlemmer, a known critic of The Left and the political left in general, has been a guest writer.

Other traditional sections of a newspaper are also included, such as an advice page, a television guide, notifications and classifieds, opinion columns, and theme sections dealing with health, environment, and other issues. The letters to the editor are often cited as examples of viewpoints of the Left party from other media sources. As with most daily German newspapers, ND is published daily Monday through Friday, with a weekend edition published on Saturdays.

In November 2006, the newspaper also started a youth insert called Sacco and Vanzetti. Beginning in March 2007, ND started publishing online.

From 1 January 2022, the newspaper is published by a cooperative, thereby becoming independent from The Left. It also officially took on the name "nd".
