= Silvio Meier =

East German left-wing activist and squatter

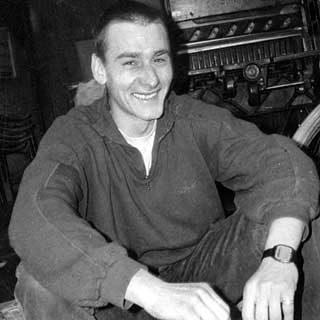
- Born: 1965; Quedlinburg, East Germany
- Died: 21 November 1992 (aged 26–27); Samariterstraße (Berlin U-Bahn); Berlin, Germany
- Cause of death: Killed by neo-Nazis
- Occupation: Printer

Silvio Meier (1965–1992) was an East German activist and squatter who was killed by neo-Nazis in Berlin on 21 November 1992. After moving to East Berlin in 1986, Meier became involved in oppositional politics with the Church from Below (Kirche von Unten). His death has been commemorated with an annual memorial march and the renaming of a street in the Berlin district of Friedrichshain.

== Career ==
Silvio Meier was born in 1965 and grew up in the East German town of Quedlinburg. He trained as a toolmaker, before moving to East Berlin in 1986 where he quickly became involved in the punk movement and oppositional politics. With others, he ran a radical library at the church at Zionskirchplatz and published a samizdat newsletter called Infoblatt mOAningstar (the capital letters "OA" referencing Offene Arbeit). He helped to found the Kirche von Unten (Church from Below) organisation, which campaigned for a space to organise alternative events. One such event was a clandestine concert in the Zionskirchplatz church on 17 October 1987 which attracted one thousand people, with the band Die Firma supporting the headliners Element of Crime, who were from West Berlin. Meier had good connections to the West Berlin anarchist scene because his older brother was living in exile there. After the bands had played, the gig was attacked by neo-Nazis and the police watched but did not intervene, causing a controversy in both East and West German media (Überfall auf die Zionskirche).

Along with other activists, Meier and his partner were picked up and interrogated by the Stasi in 1988, after a demonstration near the Pergamon Museum. When the Berlin Wall came down in 1989, Meier was involved in squatting Schreinerstrasse 47 in Friedrichshain, one of the first buildings to be occupied in East Berlin. This was the beginning of a housing movement which squatted over 100 buildings by mid-1990 and then declined after the Battle of Mainzer Straße in November.

== Death and legacy ==
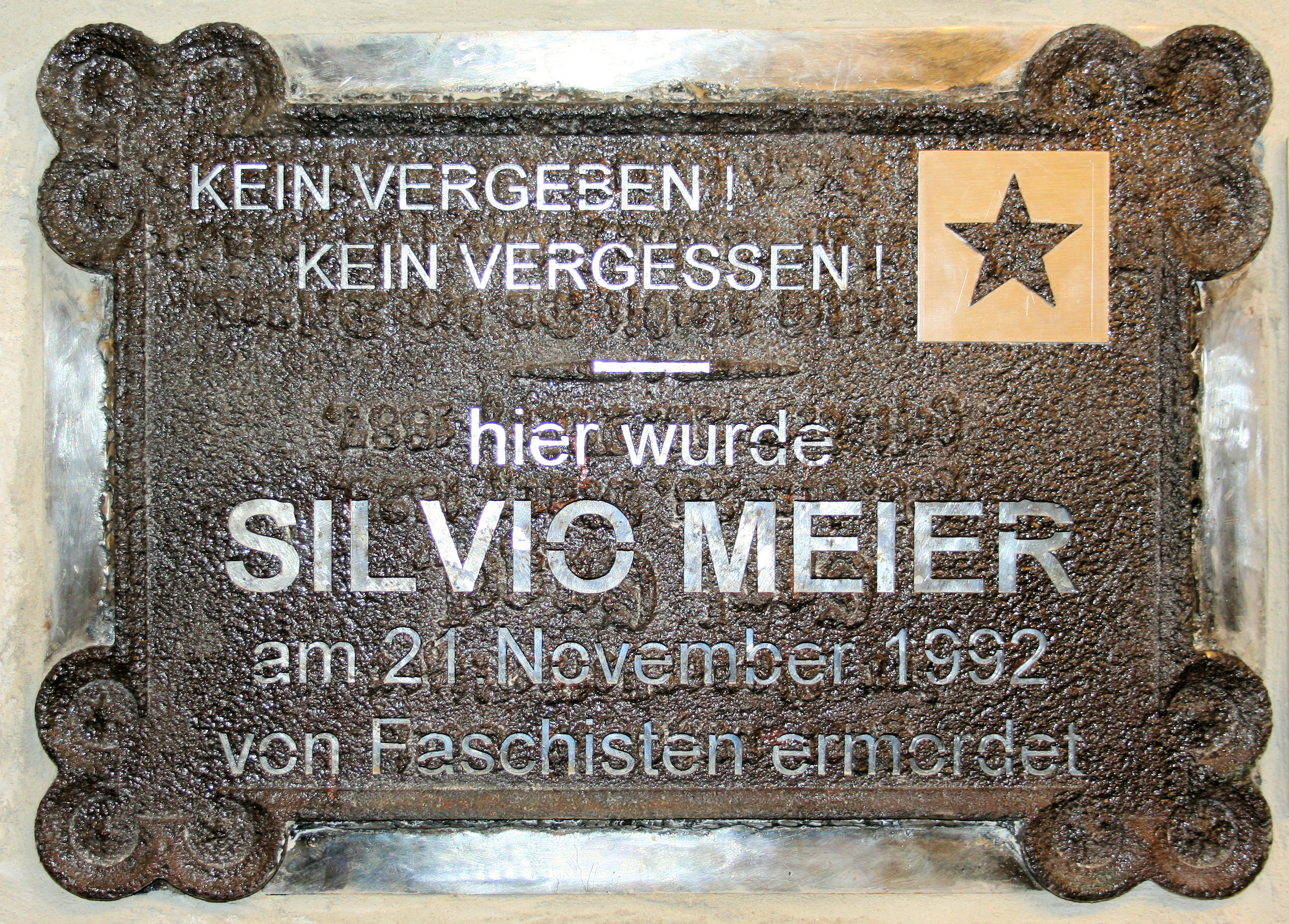
Plaque (a repurposed grave marker) dedicated to Meier at Samariterstraße U-Bahn station

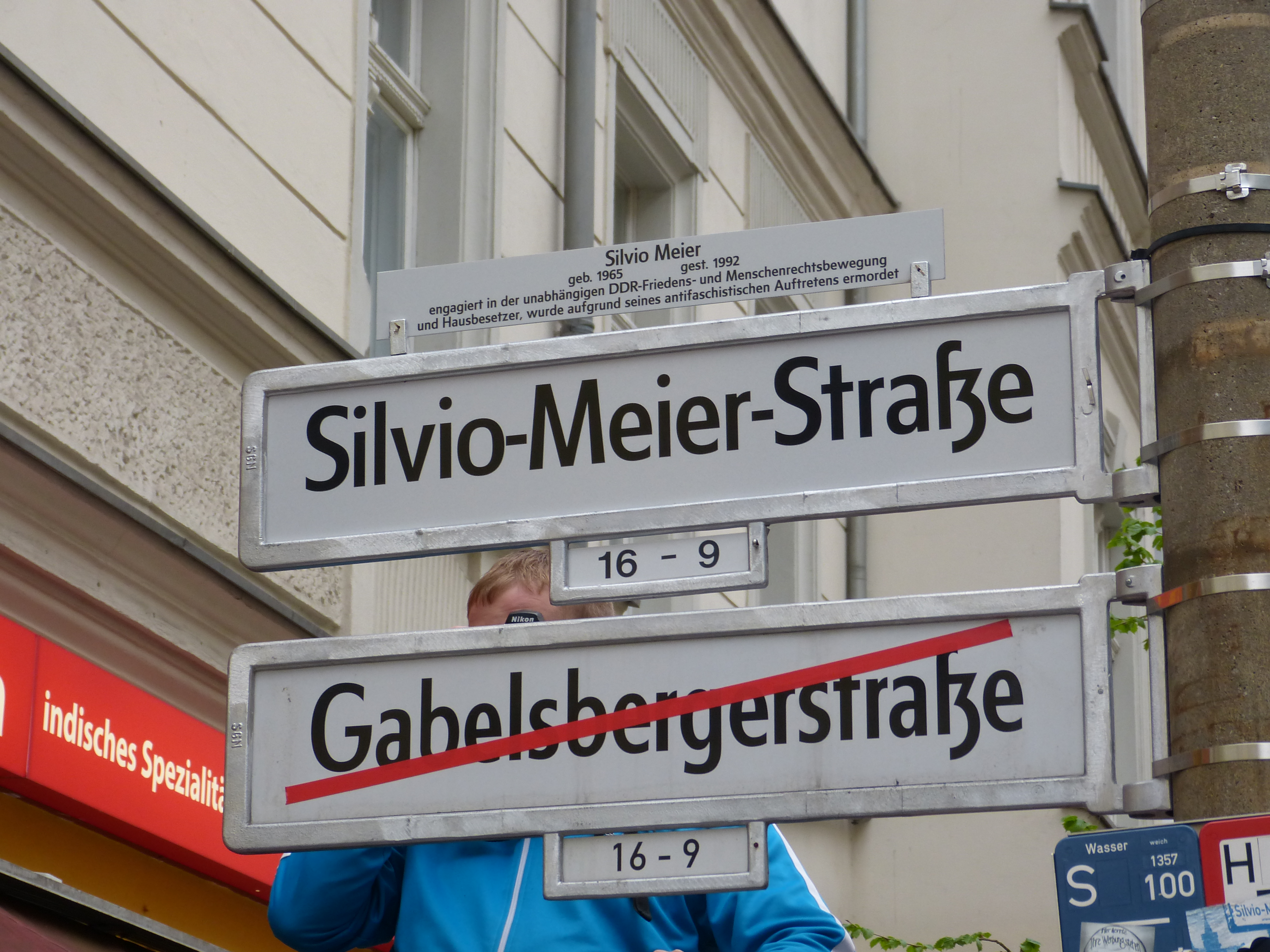
The street in Friedrichshain renamed in 2013

In 1992, Meier was living at Schreinerstrasse 47 and working as a printer. He had a one-year-old son and called his house "Villa Felix" after him. On 21 November 1992, Meier intended to go to the Eimer club in Mitte with some friends. At the Samariterstraße U-Bahn station on the corner of Samariterstraße and Frankfurter Allee, the group encountered a gang of neo-Nazis from Lichtenberg. A confrontation ensued, in which Meier was stabbed in the chest and another man was knocked unconscious. Meier died from his wounds, at the age of 27.

The following day, a group of 100 people met at Schrienerstrasse 47. They marched to a youth club named after Judith Auer in Lichtenberg which was known to be frequented by neo-Nazis and ransacked it. In 1993, a 17-year-old man was sentenced to four and a half years imprisonment for the manslaughter of Meier and two others also received suspended sentences. All three were associated with the youth club.

A plaque was erected at the U-Bahn station where Meier was murdered and a commemorative march happens every year on 21 November. Numbers grew from 200 participants in 1994 to 5,000 marchers in both 2012 and 2013. It was cancelled in 2018 and occurred again in 2019. In April 2013, a street in Friedrichshain was renamed Silvio-Meier-Straße. The naming concerned friends of Meier, who believed he would not have wanted to have been made into a hero. The previous year a self-managed social centre in Bologna had named a square after Meier.

In 2016, the Silvio Meier Prize was created by the Friedrichshain-Kreuzberg borough as a means to recognise actions taken against right-wing extremism. It was awarded to two anti-fascist activists. The following year it was received by the campaign Stand Up Against Racism.
