= Hildegard Trabant =

East German woman killed at the Berlin Wall in 1964

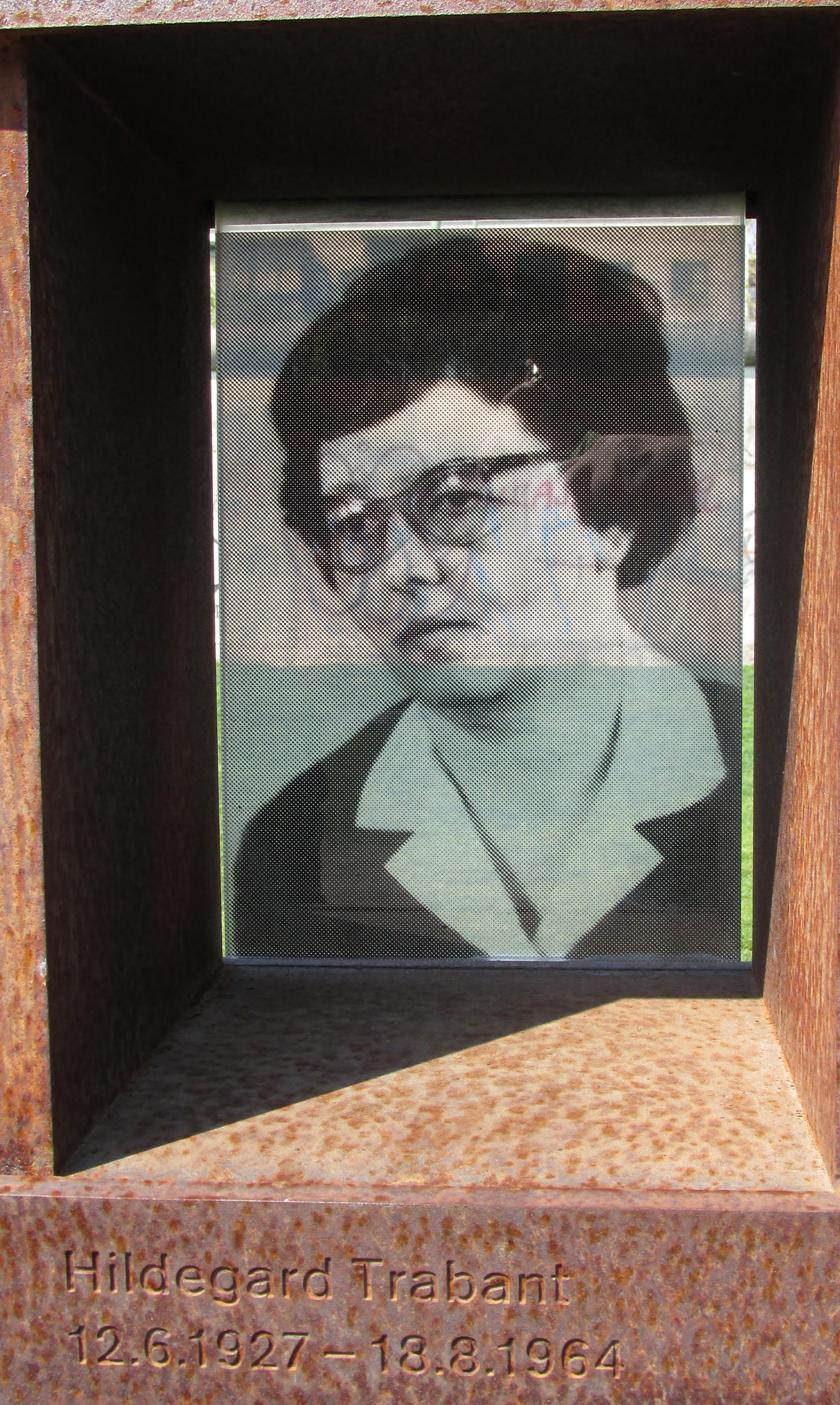
- Trabant's photo at the Berlin Wall Memorial
- Born: Hildegard Johanna Maria Pohl; 12 June 1927; Berlin, German Reich
- Died: 18 August 1964 (aged 37); East Berlin, East Germany
- Cause of death: Shot by a guard whilst attempting to enter West Berlin from East Berlin
- Body discovered: Closed S-Bahn tracks between the Schönhauser Allee and Gesundbrunnen stations 52.549483°N 13.401828°E
- Resting place: Friedhof Nordend, Berlin-Rosenthal; 52.595945°N 13.406458°E
- Monuments: White Crosses, Berlin; "Window Of Remembrance", Berlin
- Known for: Being one of eight women killed at the Berlin Wall; Probably being the only Berlin Wall victim who was classified as an attempted escapee, yet was loyal to, and not critical of, the East German government
- Political party: SED

Hildegard Johanna Maria Trabant (née Pohl; 12 June 1927 – 18 August 1964) was an East German woman who became the fiftieth known person to die at the Berlin Wall. Trabant was shot and killed by East German border guards during a crossing attempt, one of only eight women victims of the Berlin Wall, and was the only escapee victim known to have a record of loyalty toward the East German regime.

== Biography ==
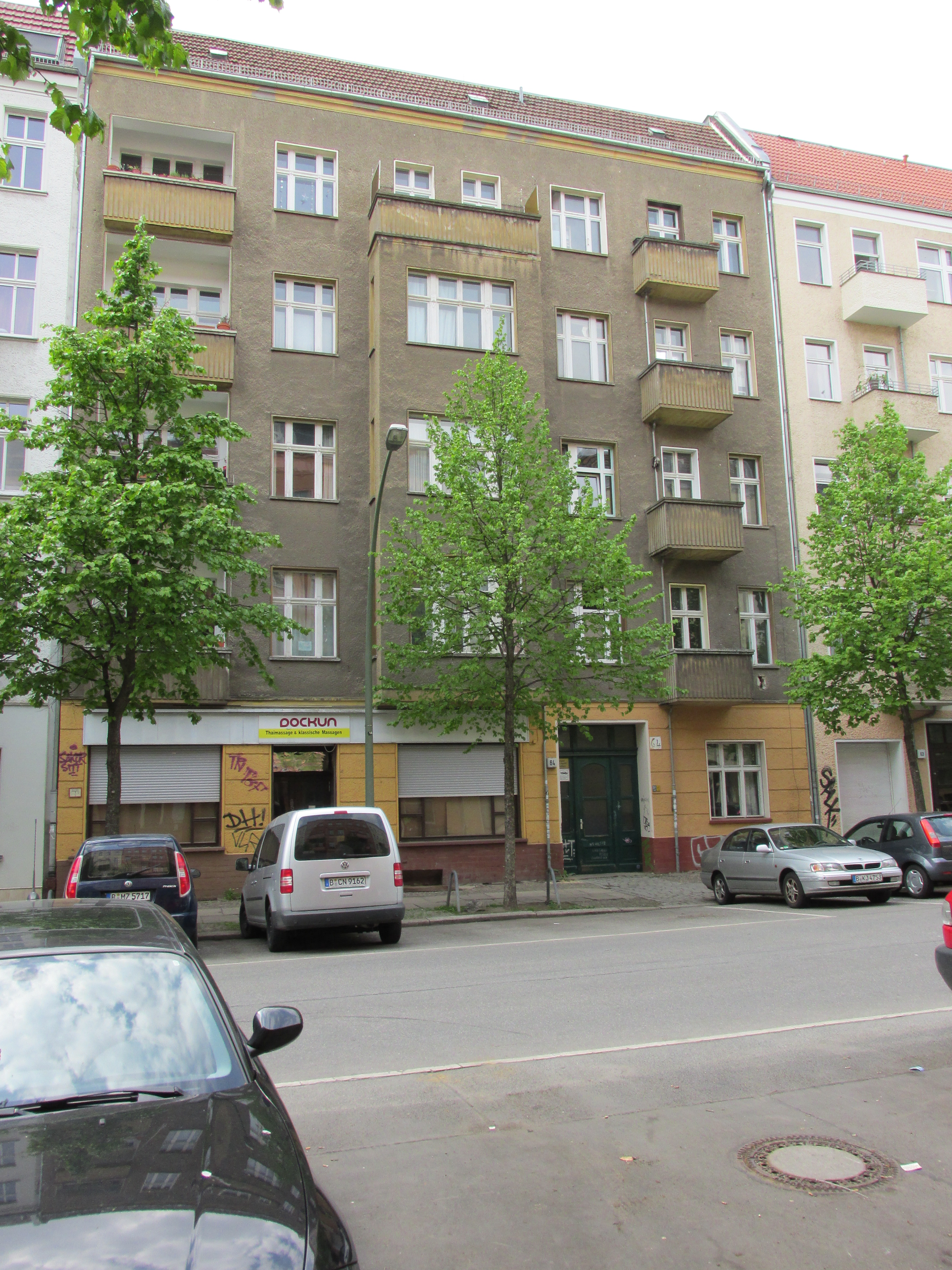
Hildegard Trabant's former residence at Richard-Sorge-Straße 64 (then, Tilsiter Straße 64), in Berlin-Friedrichshain, taken in 2014

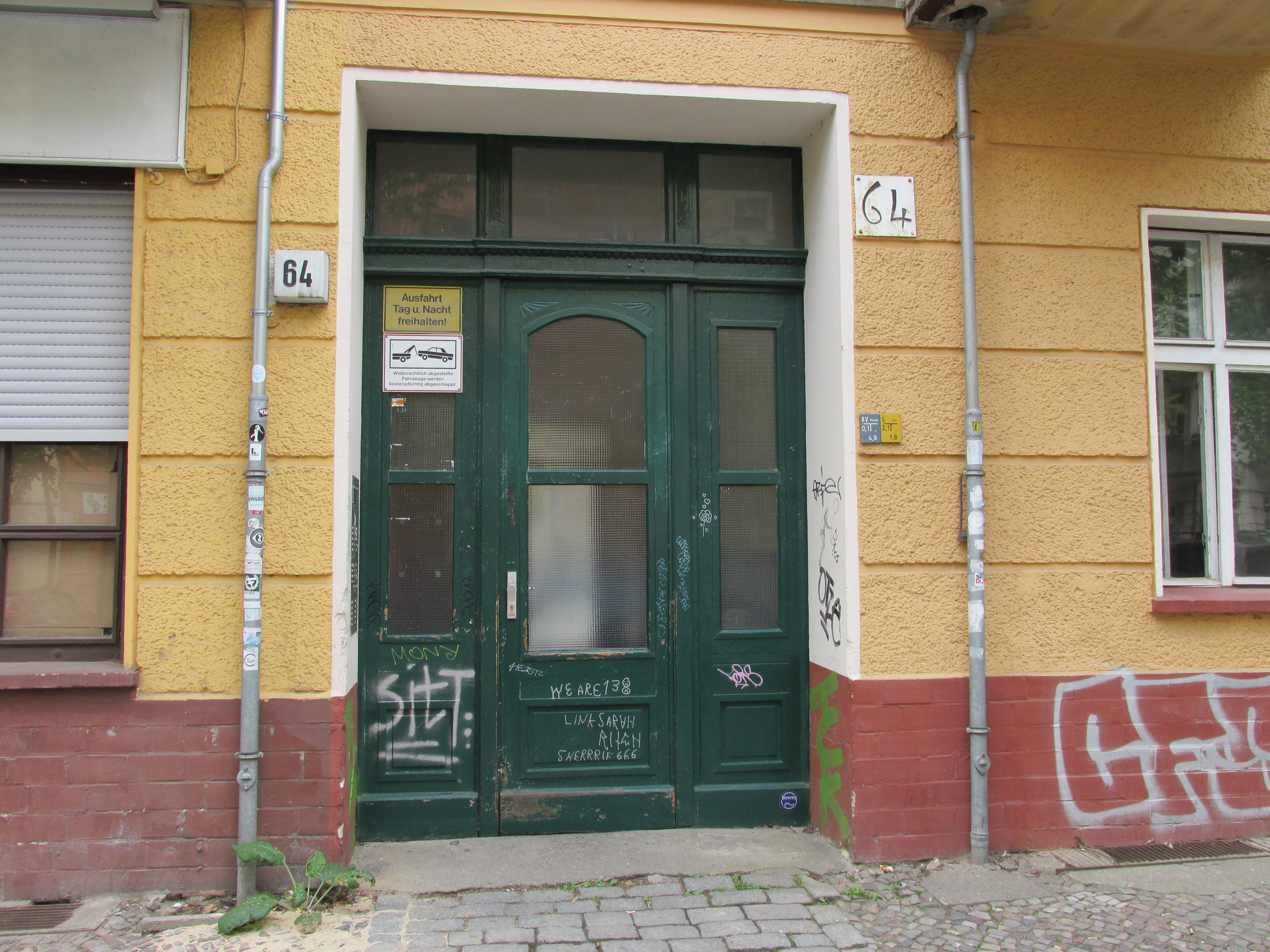
Richard-Sorge-Straße 64, in Berlin. This is the front door to the former residence of Hildegard Trabant, in Berlin-Friedrichshain, taken in 2014

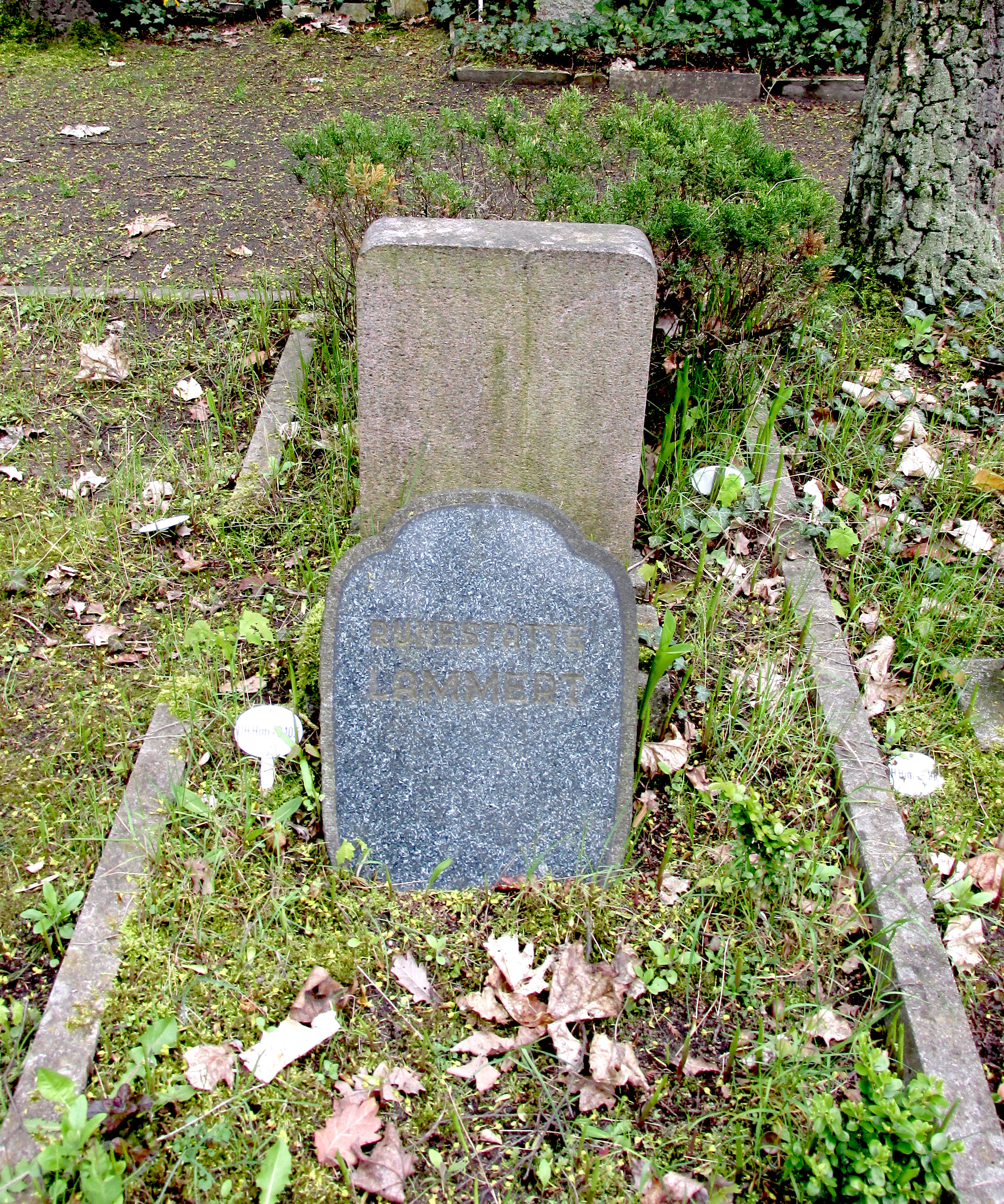
Hildegard Trabant's grave at the Friedhof Nordend, in Berlin-Rosenthal. Marked as UH Him – B102, taken in 2014

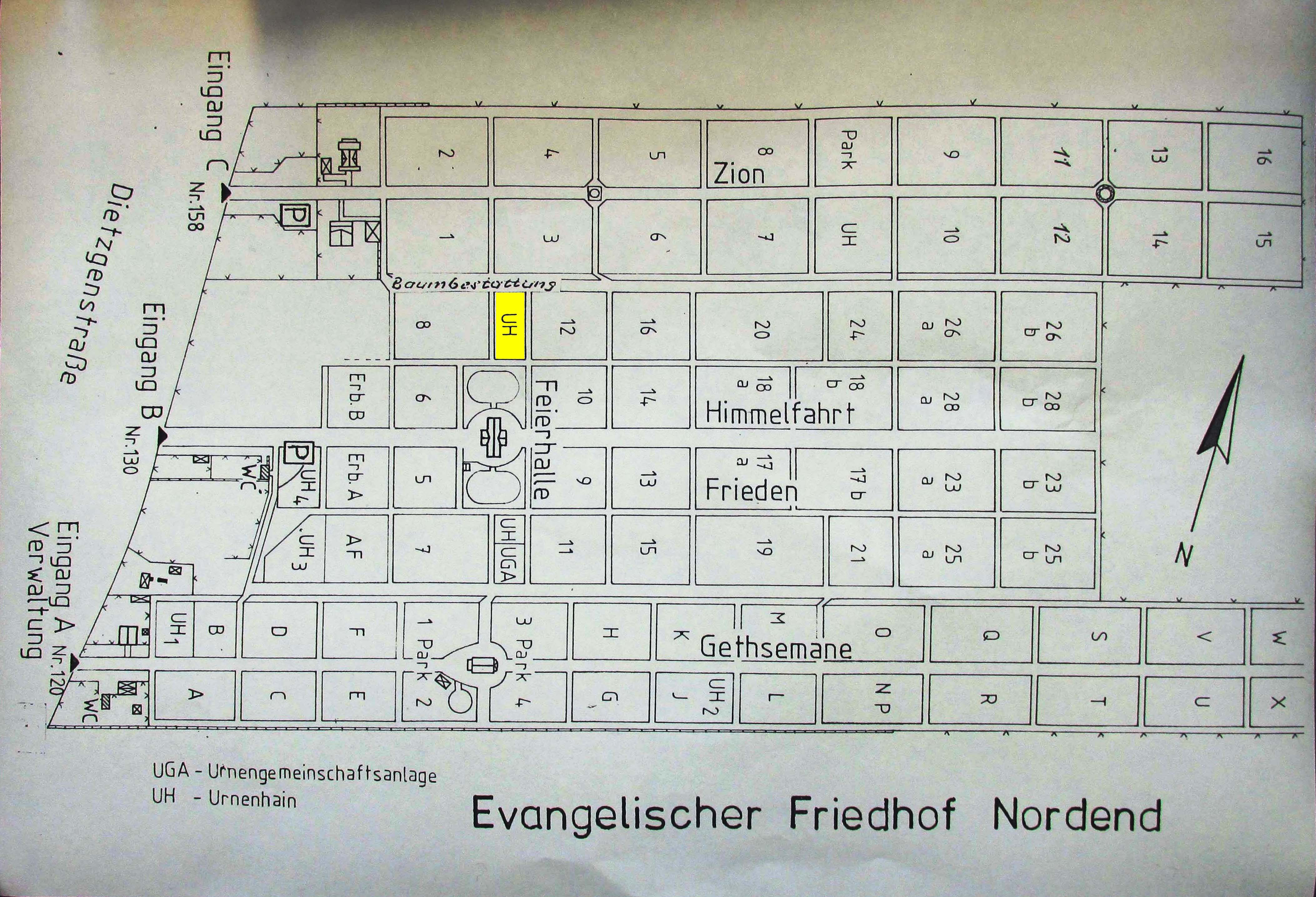
Map of the Friedhof Nordend, in Berlin-Rosenthal. The location of Hildegard Trabant's grave is highlighted in yellow.

Hildegard Pohl was born on 12 June 1927 in Berlin, Weimar Republic, and grew up in the city. She was loyal to the East German regime, having joined the governing Socialist Unity Party in 1949 at the age of 22, where she was valued as an active party member. In 1954, she married Günter Horst Trabant, a People's Police officer who was employed in the passport and registration division; the couple had no children due to a lower abdomen operation that rendered Hildegard unable to bear children. The Trabants lived in an apartment complex on Tilsiter Straße 64 (now Richard-Sorge-Straße), in the Friedrichshain district of East Berlin, near U-Bahnhof Frankfurter Tor, as well as U-Bahnhof Weberweise. Possibly facilitating their residence there, Trabant was a property manager in the Kommunale Wohnungsverwaltung Friedrichshain, a municipal housing administration in Friedrichshain.

== Death ==
On 18 August 1964, Günter Trabant reported to his office that he had not seen his wife since 7:00 in the morning the day prior, 17 August, and that some of her clothes were missing. At 6:50 in the evening the same day, Hildegard Trabant was shot trying to cross the border between East Berlin and West Berlin. Trabant had attempted to leave via a disused S-Bahn line between S-Bhf Berlin-Gesundbrunnen and S-Bhf Berlin-Schönhauser Allee, and had managed to overcome the inner wall, but was discovered by East German border guards as she was hiding behind some shrubs before reaching the other side. She ignored verbal challenges to come out from behind the shrubs and surrender. Instead, she ran back towards the inner wall and East Berlin, to avoid arrest. One of the guards fired a warning shot to get Trabant to stop, but when she continued to run, a second shot was fired, hitting her in the back. Trabant died about an hour later at the Police Hospital ("Krankenhaus der Volkspolizei" – now known as the Army Hospital ("Bundeswehrkrankenhaus"); she was 37 years old.

In the presence of his superiors, as well as in the presence of the Stasi case worker, Oberleutnant (First Lieutenant) Horst Hase, her husband Günter was either unable or unwilling to comment on circumstances which led to her attempted flight from East Germany. It is unknown why Trabant decided to flee East Germany. Evidence suggests her motives may have been of a personal nature, possibly involving domestic violence. The Trabants were known to have had several major domestic clashes, which caught the attention of Günter's supervisors within the police force. Hildegard had no other known relatives in East Germany at the time of her death, as her mother was deceased, her father was in a nursing home in West Berlin, and her only other known relative, a Günter Pohl, was in Marl-Drewer, North Rhine-Westphalia, in West Germany.

Hildegard Trabant was one of only eight women killed at the Berlin wall, among the total of at least 140 victims, and one of only four women who attempted this crossing alone. Further, of the at least 101 Berlin Wall victims that were classified as escapees or attempted escapees, she was the only one who had a record of loyalty toward the East German regime.

== Burial ==
Hildegard Trabant was buried on 23 September 1964 at the Frieden-Himmelfahrt Cemetery (now the Evangelischer Friedhof Nordend), north of Pankow, in Rosenthal. She was buried in a "linear grave", i.e., a grave which expired after the 20 years allowed under East German law without becoming a "family grave" which the family continued to maintain, or another family member was buried more recently there. This period of resting "expired" in 1984, and this particular section of the cemetery was rearranged. Her urn is still there, like all urns buried there, but it is now under another grave number, and under another name on the tombstone. Her previous grave number was UH Him – 234a and the "new" grave number is UH Him – B102.

== Aftermath ==
Unlike almost all other deaths at the Berlin Wall, Hildegard Trabant's death went totally unnoticed in West Berlin. It would only be 26 years later, after the reunification of Germany in 1990 when the 1964 East Berlin files were given to the German federal judiciary in October 1990. After a lengthy trial, Kurt Renner, the guard who shot her, was found guilty of manslaughter, and sentenced to one year and nine months in prison, which was commuted later to probation. Also unlike almost all other deaths at the Berlin Wall, it was obvious that when she was actually shot she had abandoned her attempt to escape East Berlin, and was merely fleeing back towards the inner wall to avoid arrest.

== See also ==
- List of deaths at the Berlin Wall
- Berlin Crisis of 1961
