= Frankfurter Allee station =

Frankfurter Allee station may refer to:

- Berlin Frankfurter Allee station, an S-Bahn station in Berlin
- Frankfurter Allee station (Berlin U-Bahn), an U-Bahn station in Berlin
