= Frankfurter Allee =

Street in Berlin, Germany

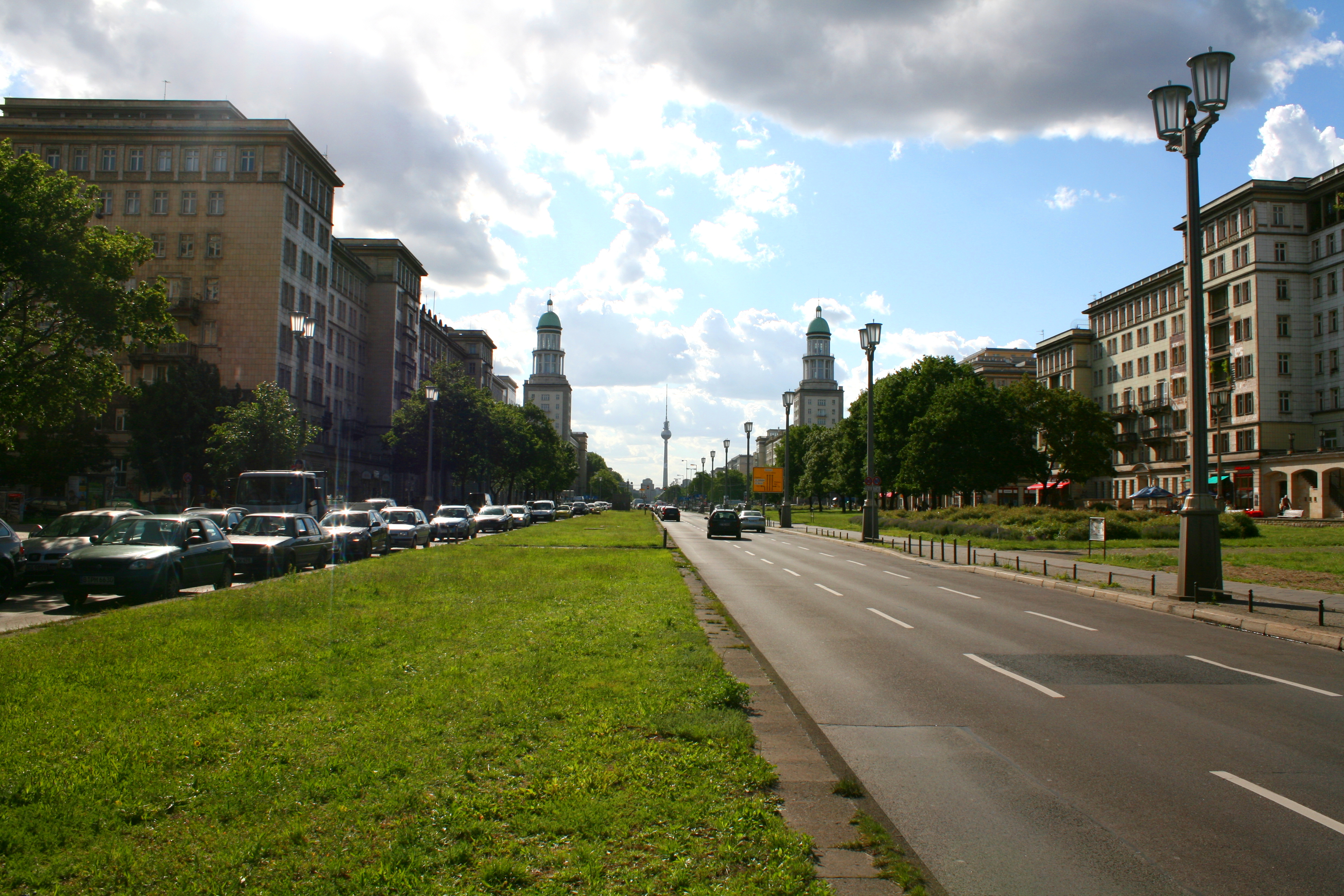
- The Allee looking towards Frankfurter Tor
- Interactive map of Frankfurter Allee
- Former names: Full length: Lindenallee or; Frankfurter Linden; (c. 1700–c. 1800); Frankfurter Chaussee; (c. 1800–1872); Parts: Frankfurter Chaussee; (1872–c. 1920); Full length: Stalinallee; (1949–1961)
- Part of: Bundesstraße 1; Bundesstraße 5
- Namesake: Frankfurt (Oder)
- Type: Thoroughfare
- Length: 3,600 m (11,800 ft)
- Location: Berlin, Germany
- Quarter: Friedrichshain, Lichtenberg, Rummelsburg
- Nearest metro station: Frankfurter Tor; Frankfurter Allee; Samariterstraße; Magdalenenstraße; Lichtenberg
- Coordinates: 52°30′48″N 13°28′41″E
- West end: Karl-Marx-Allee; Frankfurter Tor; Warschauer Straße; Petersburger Straße
- Major junctions: Gürtelstraße; Möllendorffstraße; Weitlingstraße; Skandinavische Straße
- East end: Rosenfelder Straße; Alt-Friedrichsfelde

Construction
- Inauguration: Generally: 1708; Current name: 20 September 1872; (official renaming, progressively implemented 1872, 1881, 1916); 12 November 1961

The Frankfurter Allee is one of the oldest roads of Berlin, the capital city of Germany. It extends the Karl-Marx-Allee from Frankfurter Tor in the direction of the city of Frankfurt (Oder). It is part of Bundesstraße 1 and has a length of 3.6 kilometres (2.2 mi).

Line U5 of the city's U-Bahn runs beneath the length of Frankfurter Allee. The U-Bahn stations of Frankfurter Tor, Samariterstraße, Frankfurter Allee, Magdalenenstraße and Lichtenberg are all under or adjacent to the street. Frankfurter Allee and Lichtenberg stations are also served by the city's S-Bahn.

== History ==
Following the establishment of the German Democratic Republic the Frankfurter Allee was officially renamed Stalinallee on 22 December 1949 to honour Stalin's 70th birthday. The street was to become the most well known in East Berlin, with the poet Kurt Barthel penning a poem to commemorate the occasion of its renaming:

Wie soll man Stalin danken?
Wir geben dieser Strasse seinen Namen.

In August 1951 the first statute of Stalin to be erected in the GDR was unveiled on Stalinallee. A new building programme was also launched in the same year to provide housing in the area around the street. Led by the architect Hermann Henselmann the project was designed in the Stalinist style, but reputedly suffered from poor construction work and ran over budget. Despite being intended as a showcase of the Stalinist project in the GDR, the East German uprising of 1953 first began on a construction site of the project. In November 1961 the road was once again renamed Frankfurter Allee.
