= Frankfurter Tor station =

Station of the Berlin U-Bahn

Coordinates: 52°30′57″N 13°27′15″E

Frankfurter Tor
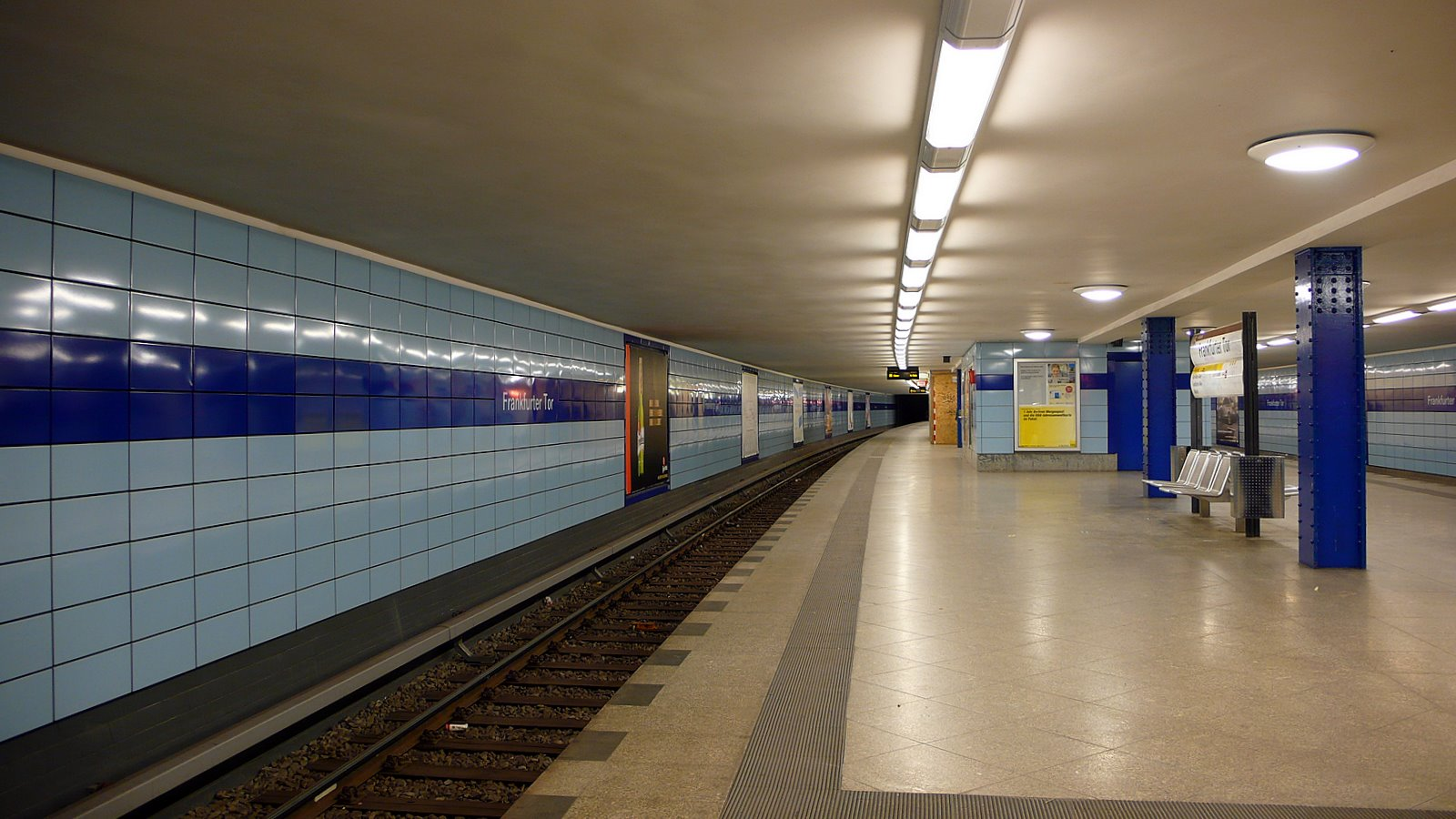
- Platform view of Frankfurter Tor

General information
- Location: Frankfurter Allee/Karl-Marx-Allee/Warschauer Straße/Petersburger Straße; Friedrichshain-Kreuzberg
- Owner: Berliner Verkehrsbetriebe
- Operator: Berliner Verkehrsbetriebe
- Platforms: 1 island platform
- Tracks: 2
- Train operators: Berliner Verkehrsbetriebe

Construction
- Structure type: Underground

Other information
- Fare zone: VBB: Berlin A/5555

History
- Opened: 21 December 1930; 95 years ago
- Former names: Petersburger Straße (1930 - 1946, 1996 - 2006); Bersarinstraße (1946 - 1958); Bersarinstraße (Frankfurter Tor) (1958); Rathaus Friedrichshain (1991 - 1996)

Services
Preceding station	Berlin U-Bahn	Following station
Weberwiese towards Berlin Hbf	U5	Samariterstraße towards Hönow
Location

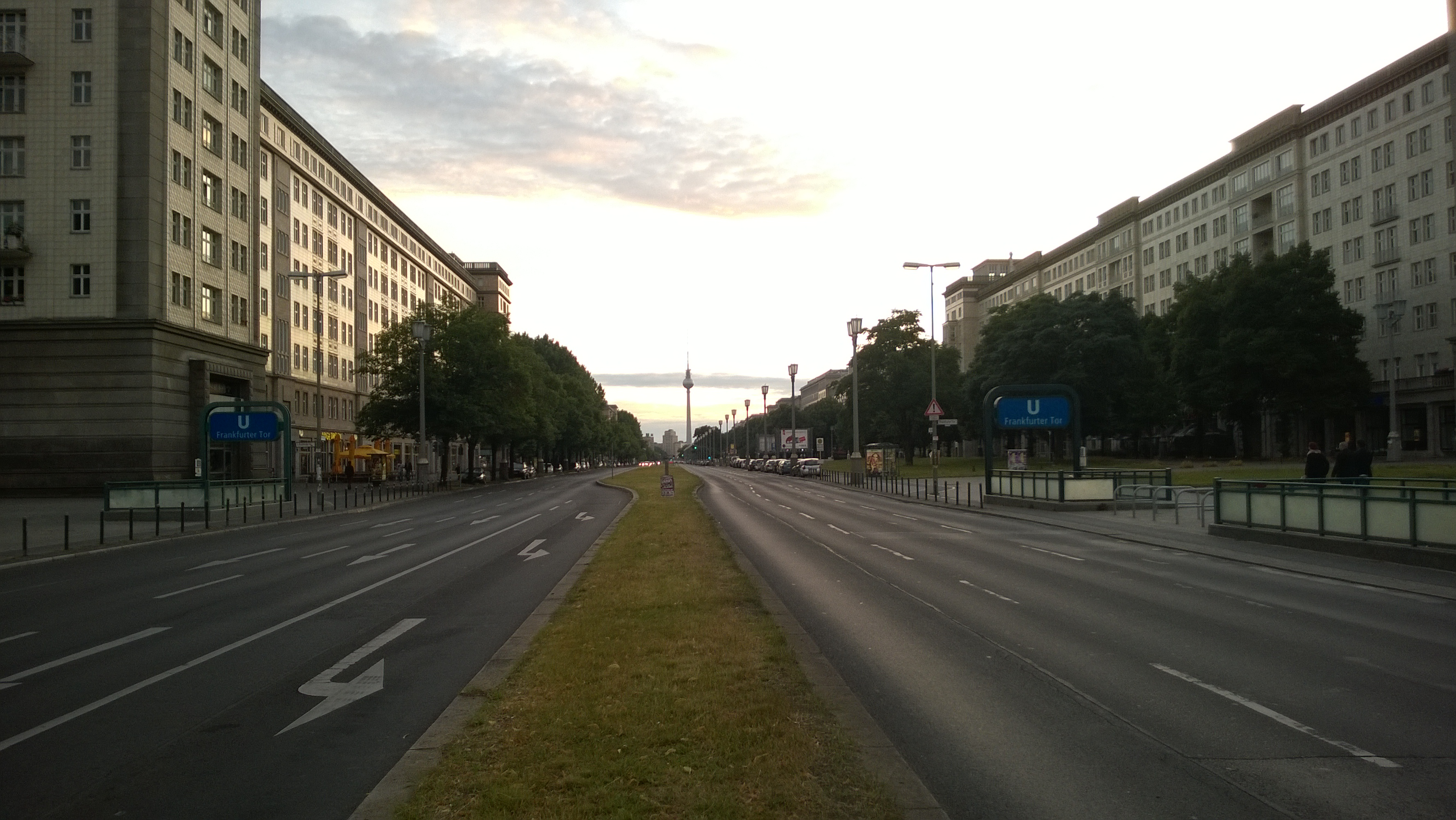
Entrances on each side of Karl-Marx-Allee

Frankfurter Tor is a station on U-Bahn line U5 in Berlin, Germany. It is situated under Frankfurter Tor, a large square.

== History ==
Built in 1930 and designed by the architect Alfred Grenander and originally named Petersburger Straße. The Allied forces bombed the station on 21 December 1940, and on the 3 February 1945, destroying the station's interior fixtures. From April to June 1945, Line E was disrupted. On 16 June 1945, Nikolai Berzarin was the first Russian commander of Berlin, so the station was renamed to Bersarinstraße in 1946, and in 1958, it was later renamed to Bersarinstraße (Frankfurter Tor), and then just renamed to Frankfurter Tor.

After the fall of the Berlin Wall and Communism, it was renamed to Rathaus Friedrichshain in 1991. In 1996, it was originally thought to be named Frankfurter Tor for their plans, but in the end, it was renamed to Petersburger Straße. To repair the damage inflicted by the World War II, it was closed from September to December 2003, and all the bullet holes were removed. Finally, on 20 February 2006, it was renamed to Frankfurter Tor.

In future, there are plans for U1 to be extended to Frankfurter Tor, but because it duplicates the tram route M10, there is also a possibility of extending U1 to Ostkreuz after the refurbishment in 2015.
