= Bundesstraße 1 =

Federal highway in Germany

B 1
- Bundesstraße 1

Route information
- Length: 778 km (483 mi)

Location
- Country: Germany
- States: North Rhine-Westphalia, Lower Saxony, Saxony-Anhalt, Brandenburg, Berlin

Highway system
- Roads in Germany; Autobahns; List; Federal; List; State; E-roads

The Bundesstraße 1 (abbr. B1) is a German federal highway running in an east-west direction from the Dutch border near Aachen to the Polish border at Küstrin-Kietz on the Oder River.

== History ==
The road developed from an ancient east-western trade route connecting the shore of the North Sea at Bruges with the area of Novgorod. A trade and military road was already mentioned in Ptolemy's Geography about 150 AD, parts of it formed the medieval Westphalian Hellweg trade route, vital for the transport of salt and crops, and the course of the Via Regia, the Ottonian "royal road" through the Holy Roman Empire from Aachen to Magdeburg.

From the late 18th century onwards, parts of the route were rebuilt as a chaussee, mainly in the area between Aachen and Jülich as well as on the nearby territory of the County of Mark, promoted by the Brandenburg-Prussian administration under Heinrich Friedrich Karl vom und zum Stein. Stein also concluded an agreement to extend the road via the territory of Imperial Essen Abbey for the accessibility of the coal deposits in Cleves. The road from the Prussian capital Berlin to the royal castles in Potsdam was rebuilt in 1792 and extended to Brandenburg an der Havel until 1799.

After Napoleonic Wars and the Empire's dissolution in 1806, the Prussian monarchs systematically expanded the road network, completing the chaussee between Berlin and Magdeburg in 1824, and between Berlin and Königsberg in 1828, reaching the East Prussian terminus at Gumbinnen (present-day Gusev, Russia) in 1835. In 1932 the major highways of the German Reich were numbered and two years later the Fernverkehrsstraße 1 was incorporated into the Reichsstraßen system. After 1945 the former Reichstraße 1 was split into Bundesstraße 1 in West Germany and Fernverkehrsstraße 1 in East Germany until 1990. The part east of the Oder became part of different polish Droga krajowa.

== Route description ==
The road's western terminus is in Aachen, where it connects with the N278 in the Netherlands.

The road heads eastward through the Ruhr Area in the state of North Rhine Westphalia. Here it is identical with A 40. Leaving the Ruhr Area east of Dortmund, the B1 travels the more scenic route that shadows the A 2. Here it follows the old trading route Hellweg, crossing cities like Unna, Werl, Soest, Paderborn, Hamelin, Hildesheim and Brunswick. It then continues to Magdeburg, Potsdam and Berlin.

The road reaches Berlin's city limits at Glienicke Bridge(also known as the bridge of spies) and heads towards the inner city via Potsdamer Platz, Leipziger Platz and Leipziger Straße to Alexanderplatz. It leaves Berlin to the eastern side via Karl-Marx-Allee, Frankfurter Tor and Frankfurter Allee, joined by the Bundesstraße 5 for around 20 km up to Müncheberg, before reaching the Polish border.

The road's eastern terminus in Küstrin-Kietz is with Polish national road DK22 which crosses the country in an easterly direction.

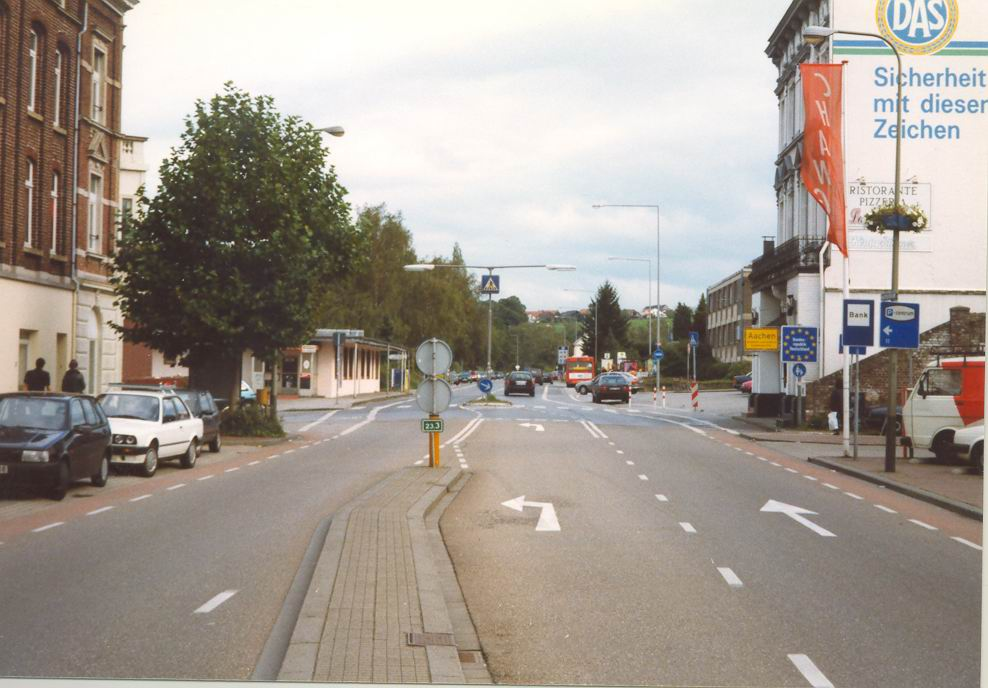
Aachen

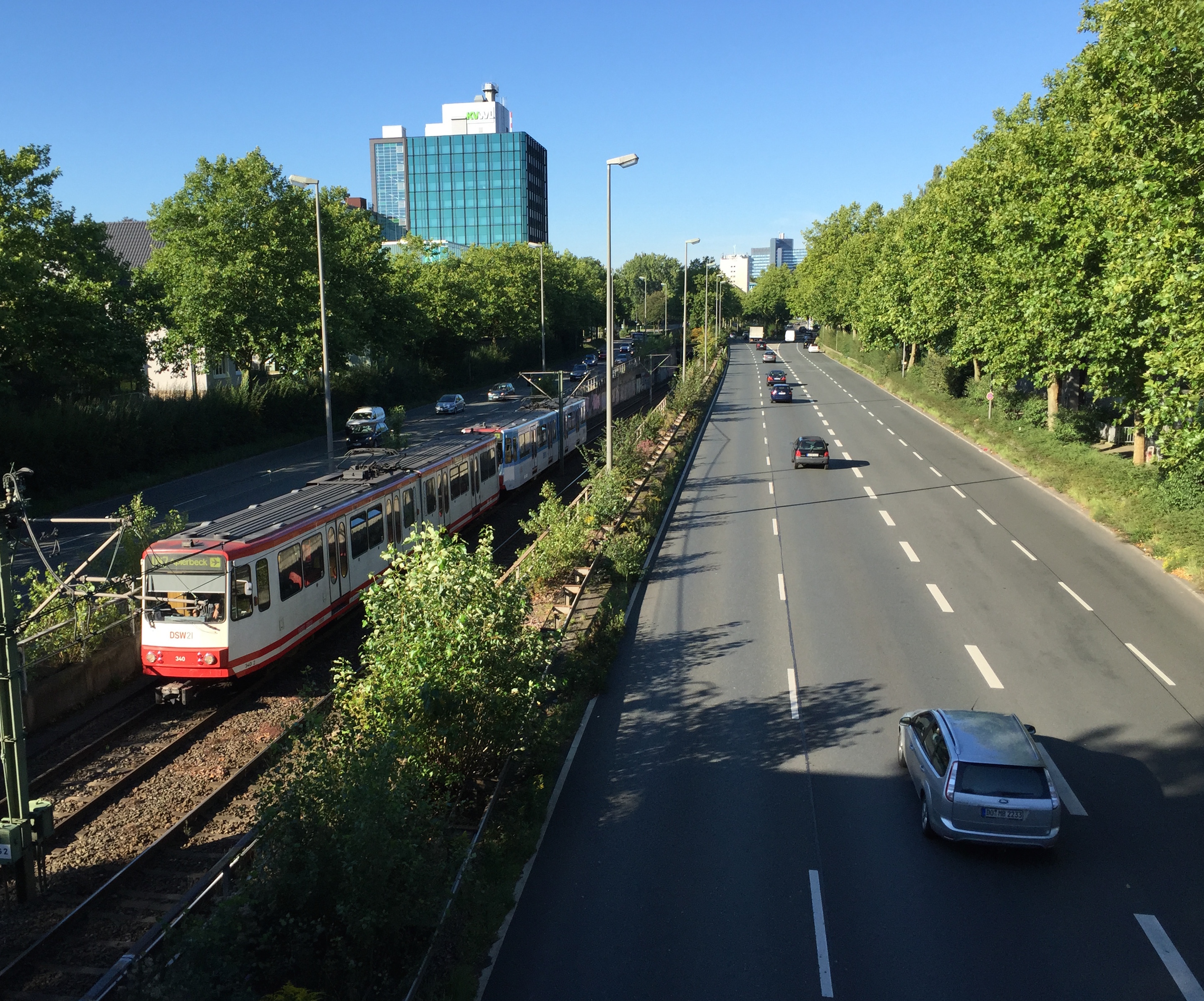
Dortmund

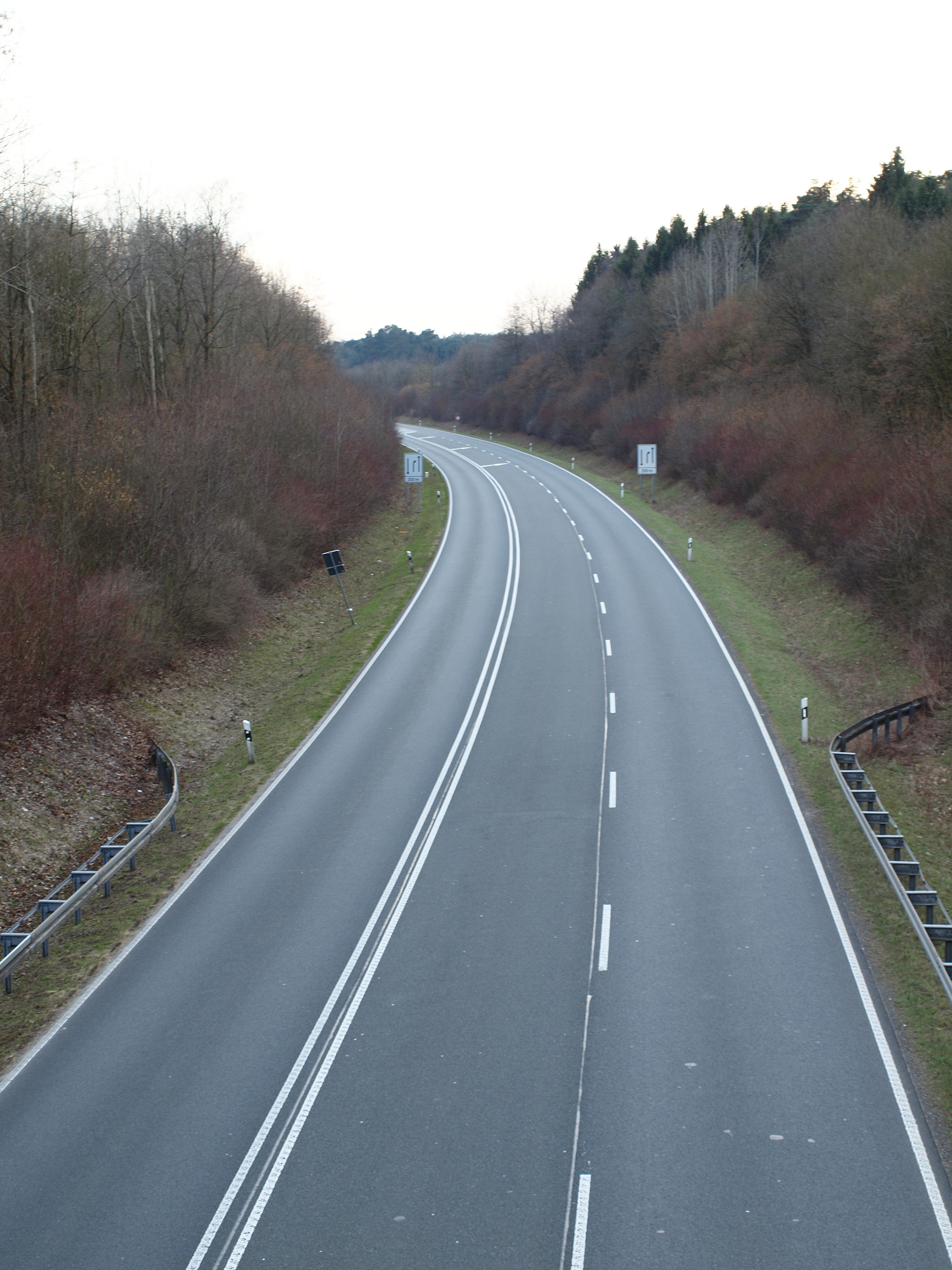
near Schlangen

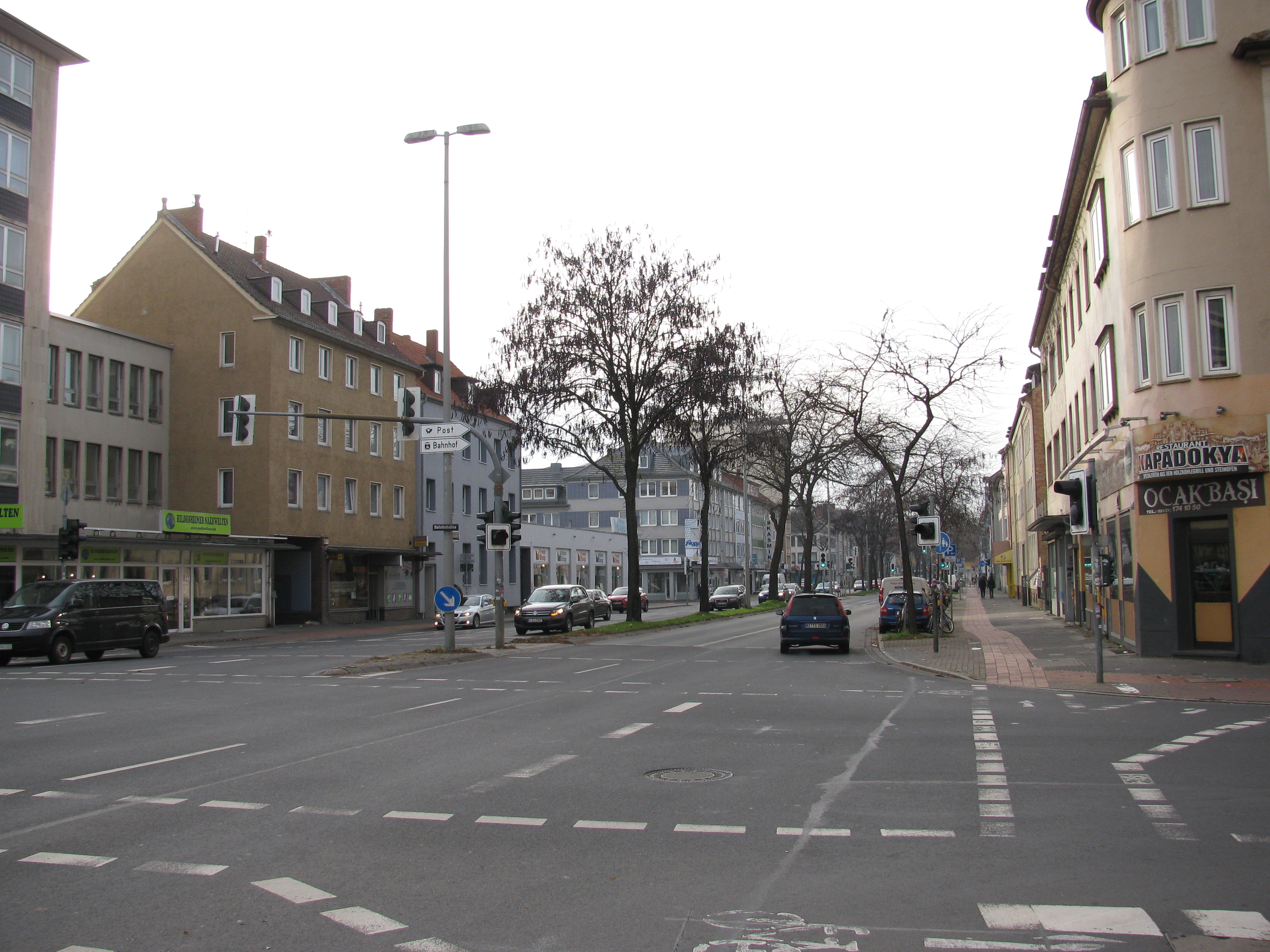
Hildesheim

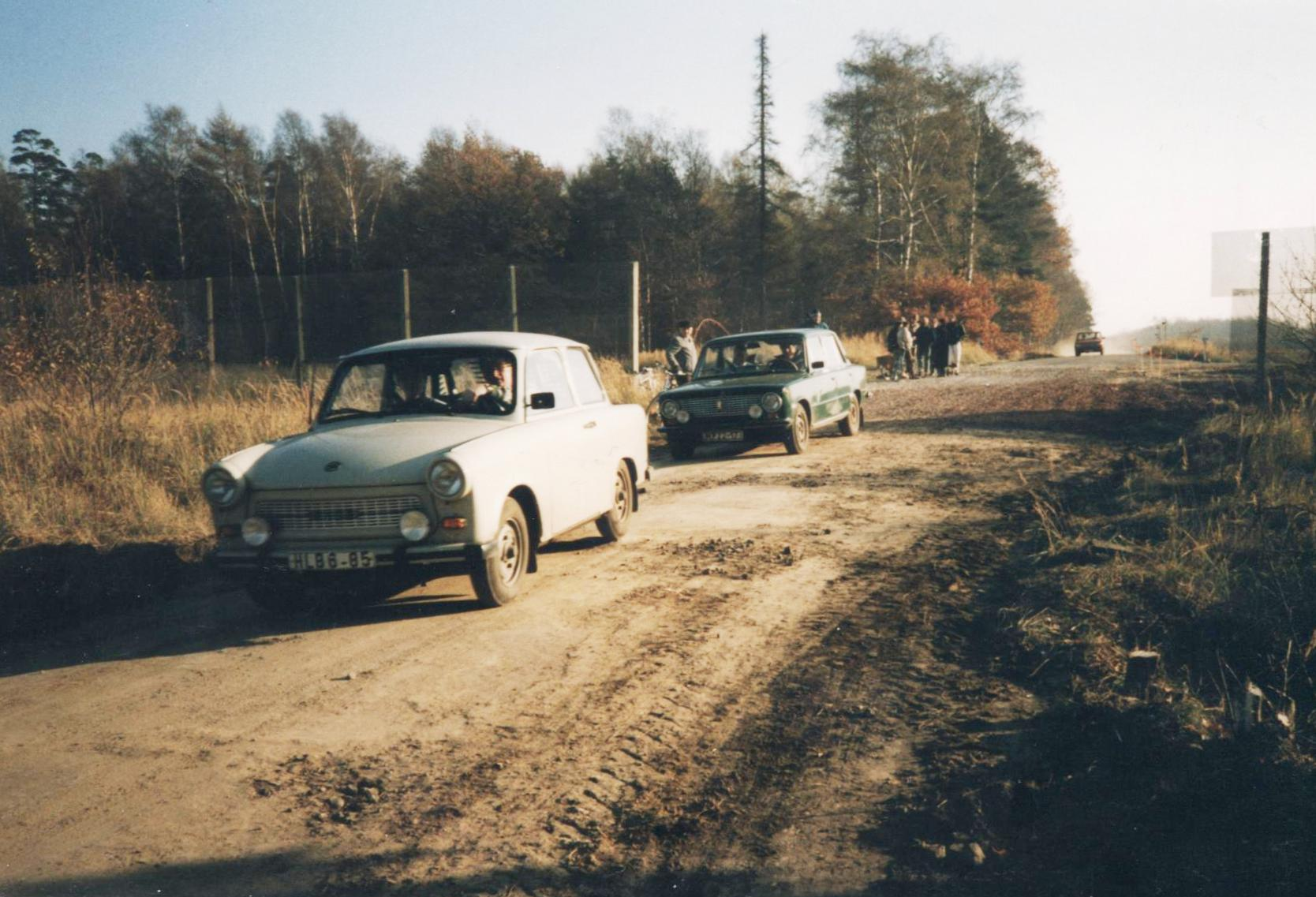
Opening of the border on Highway B1/F1 between Helmstedt (West Germany) and Morsleben (East Germany) on November 18, 1989.

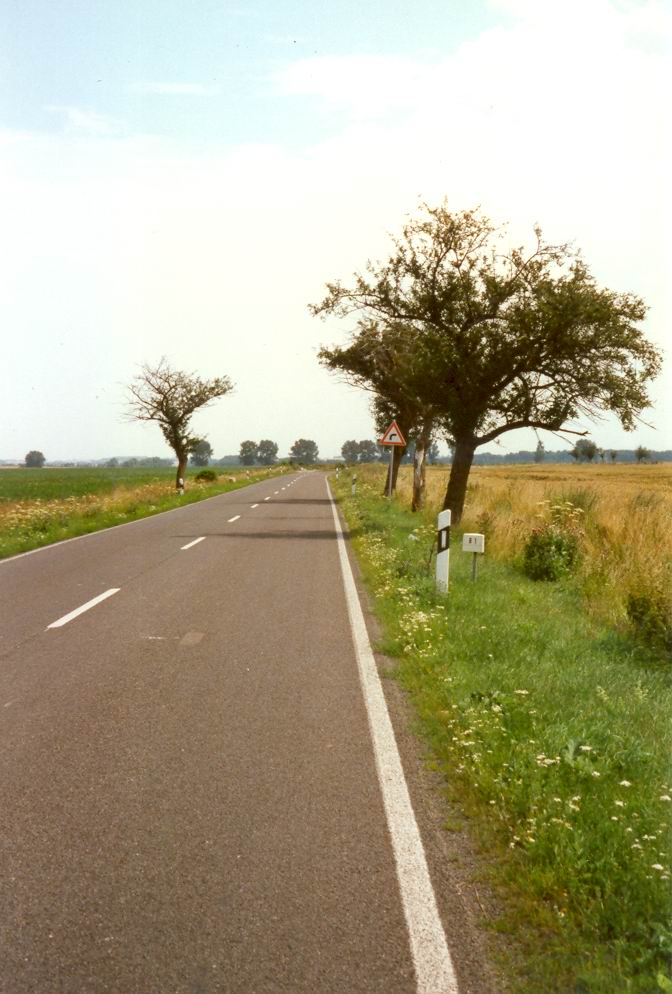
Near Erxleben

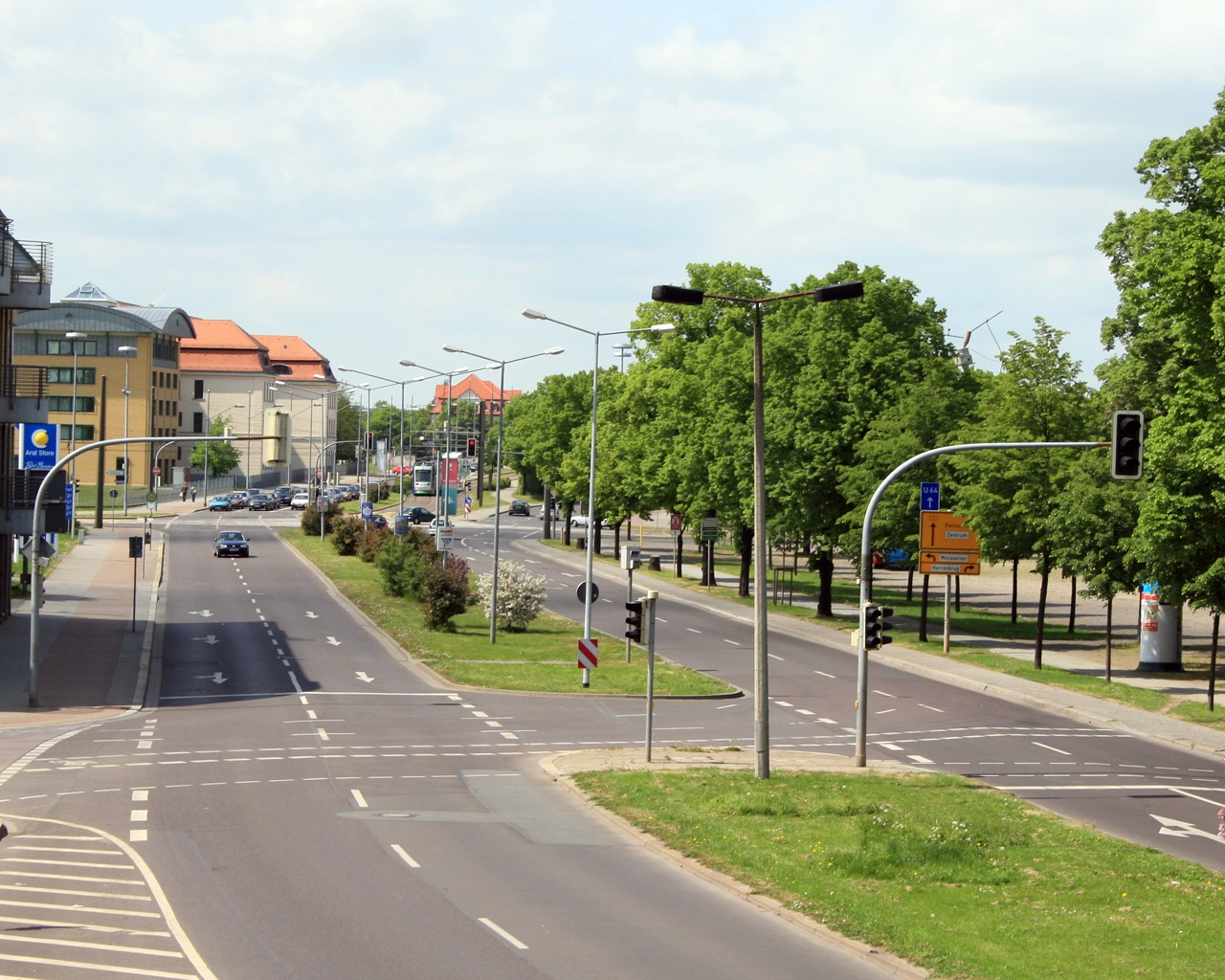
Magdeburg

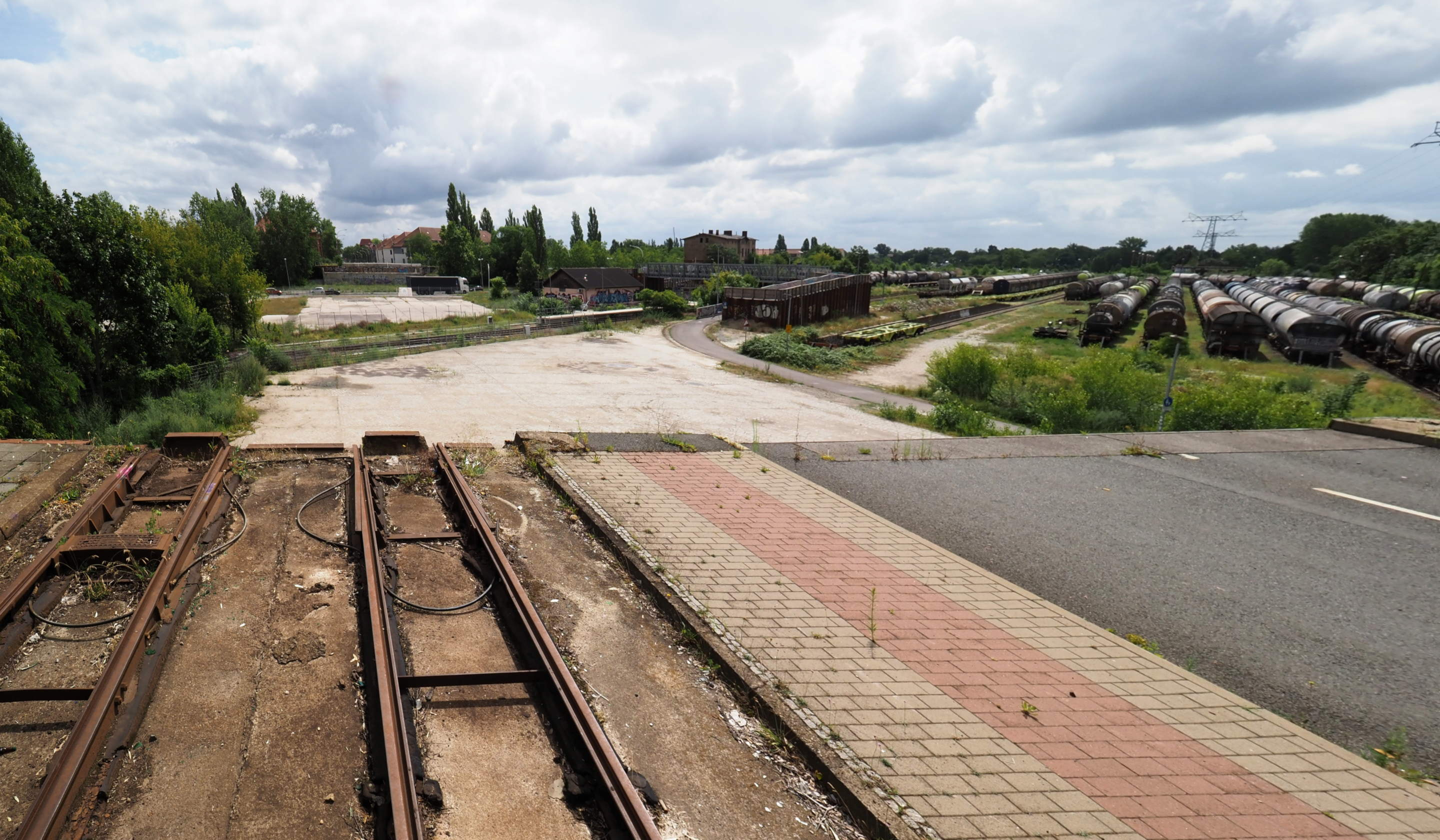
Interruption by a demolished bridge in Brandenburg an der Havel

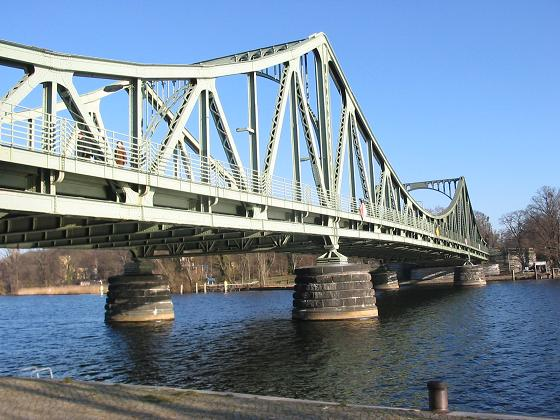
Glienicke Bridge, Potsdam/Berlin

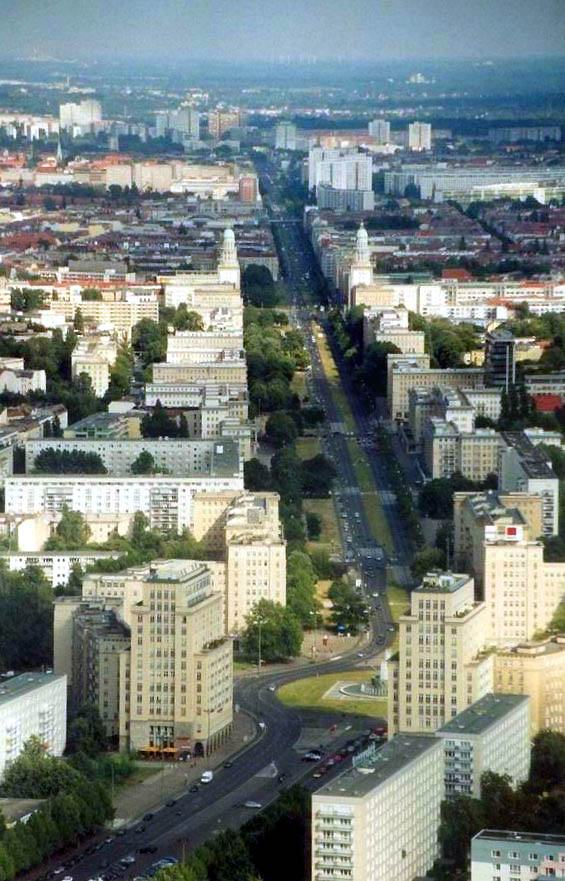
Karl-Marx-Allee, Berlin

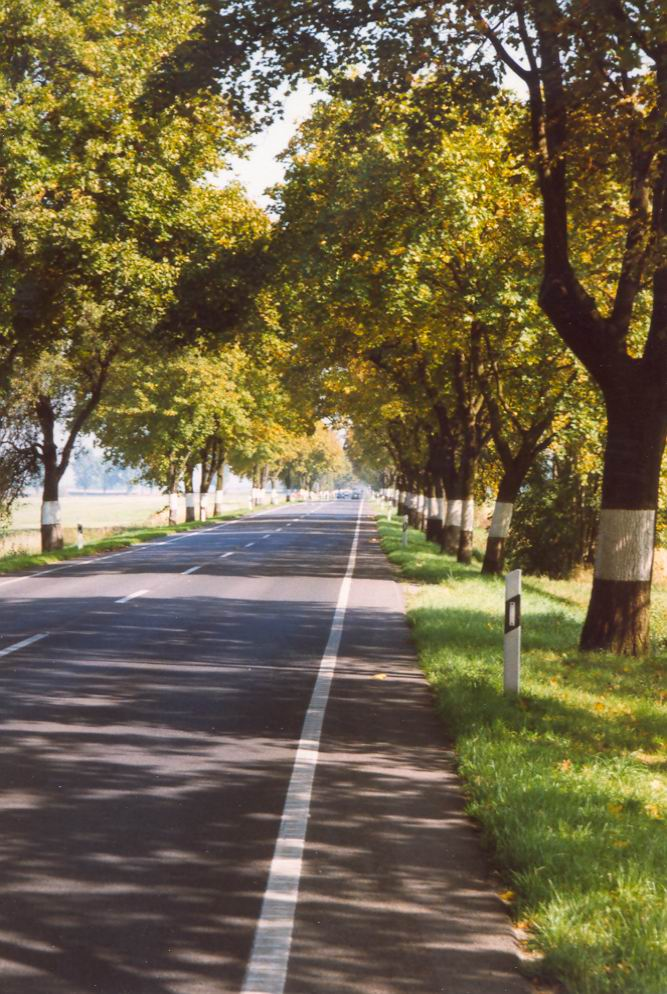
Seelow (Oderbruch)

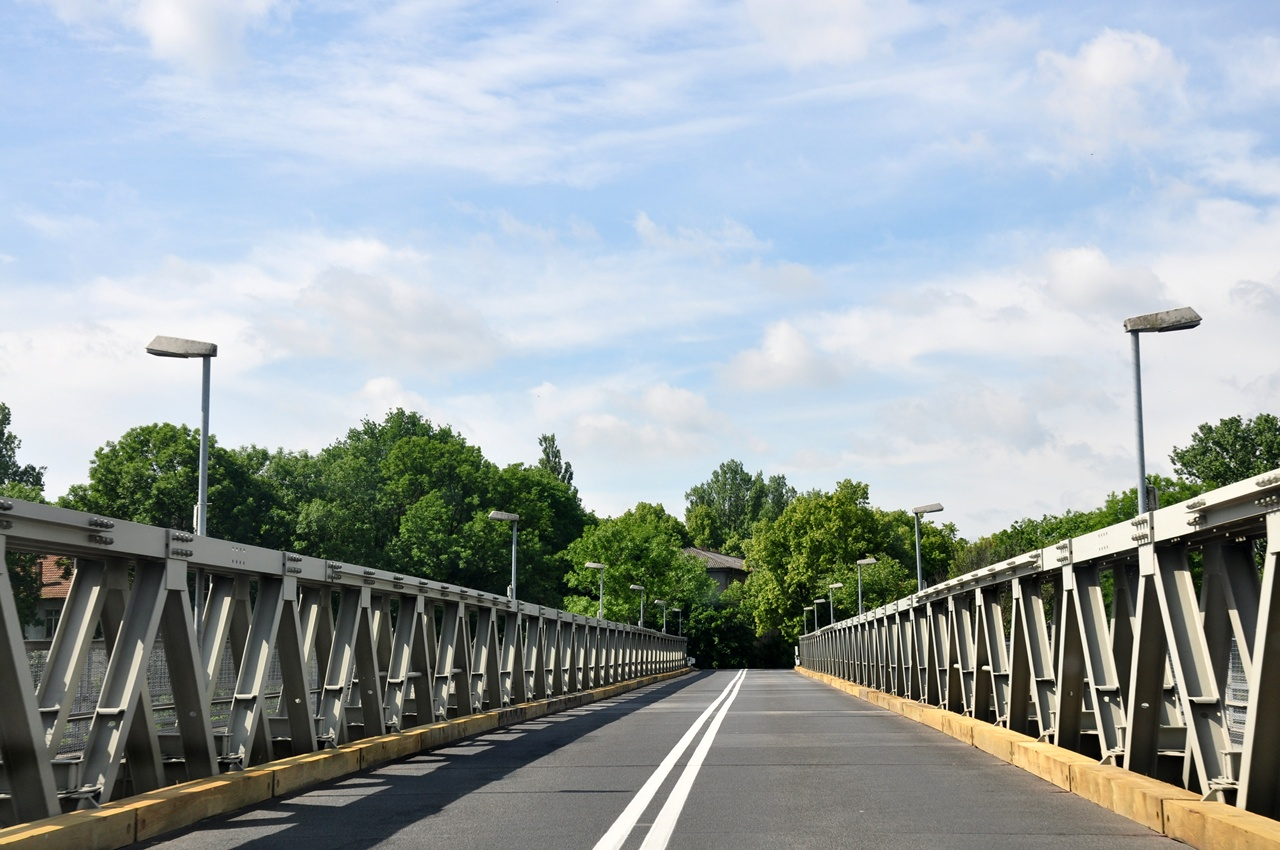
Kostrzyn

== See also ==
- List of federal highways in Germany
