= Inner Ring Road, Berlin =

System of roads in Berlin, Germany

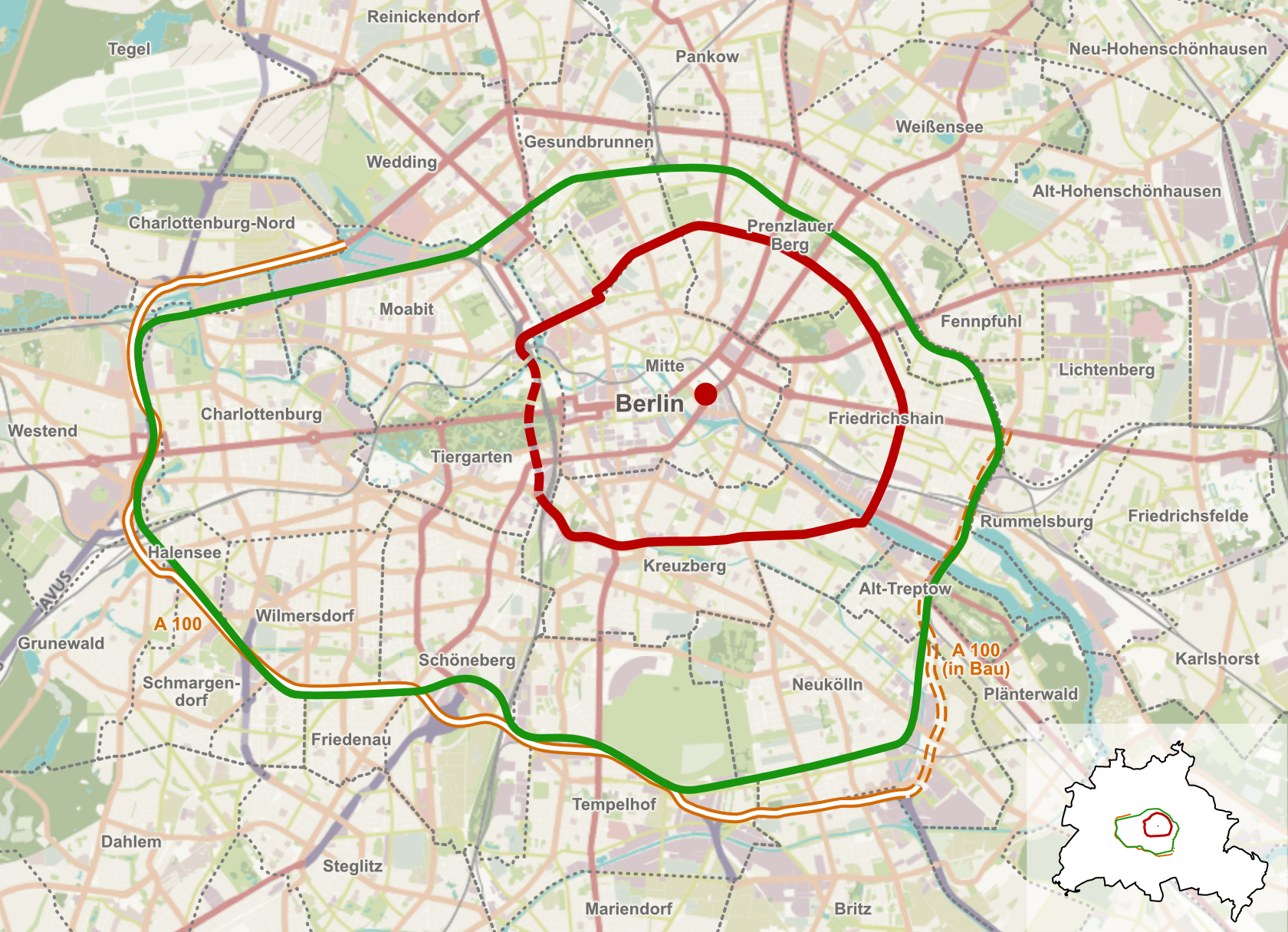
Inner Ring Road (red) in relation to Berlin Ringbahn railway (green) and Red City Hall (red dot)

The Berlin Inner Ring (German: Berliner Innenstadtring) road is a beltway route of major roads around the historic city centre of Berlin encompassing the boroughs of Mitte, Pankow and Friedrichshain-Kreuzberg. It is named "Inner Ring" to distinguish it from both the wider City Ring (Stadtring) road including the Bundesautobahn 100 sections and the outer Berlin Ring (Berliner Ring) orbital motorway.

== Course ==
The Inner Ring road runs from Berlin Main Station in Moabit clockwise along Invalidenstraße to Mitte, Caroline-Michaelis-Straße, Julie-Wolfthorn-Straße, Bernauer Straße, through Prenzlauer Berg along Eberswalder Straße and Danziger Straße to Friedrichshain, Petersburger Straße, Warschauer Straße and Am Oberbaum, crosses the Spree River on Oberbaumbrücke to Kreuzberg, Oberbaumstraße, Skalitzer Straße, Gitschiner Straße, further westwards on Hallesches Ufer and Reichpietschufer (westbound) / Waterloo-Ufer, Tempelhofer Ufer and Schöneberger Ufer (eastbound) and finally back to the main station via the Tiergarten tunnel.

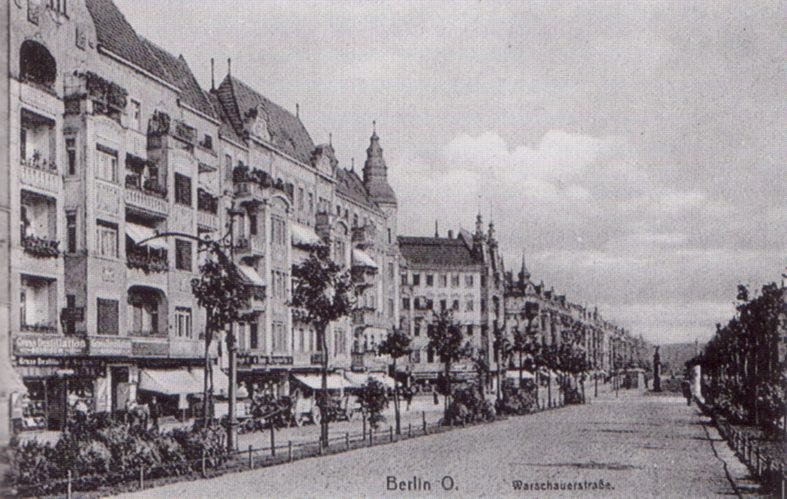
Warschauer Straße, 1910

In the southern part the route is identical with the historic customs city wall that was begirding the Old Berlin until 1861. The city wall had roads along its length so that after the wall was torn down it opened spaces similar to a boulevard. In the western part there had been the Entlastungsstraße road cut through the Great Tiergarten park to avoid the places around the Brandenburg Gate and the Reichstag by about a mile. In the northern part the route takes advantage of one of the Hobrecht-Plan ring roads which runs considerably more outside of the Old Berlin limits so that there is no historic connection from Invalidenstraße to Bernauer Straße. The open space at Bernauer Straße is a consequence of the Berlin Wall which led to old buildings along the street to be torn down.

Rebuilding Invalidenstraße into a major road is the only thing left to close the Inner Ring Road. It was supposed to be finished in 2002 when the new main station had opened but it was blocked by court decision. It was left until end of December 2010 that finally all trials were dismissed and the court approved the plan which will rebuild the street into four lanes plus tram rail tracks and bicycle lanes. The senator announced that construction will start in spring of 2011 but one can not expect the new road to open before the mid of 2013. Berlin's urban planning department expects the last of three phases to be finished during 2015.
