= Frankfurter Allee station (Berlin U-Bahn) =

Station of the Berlin U-Bahn

Frankfurter Allee
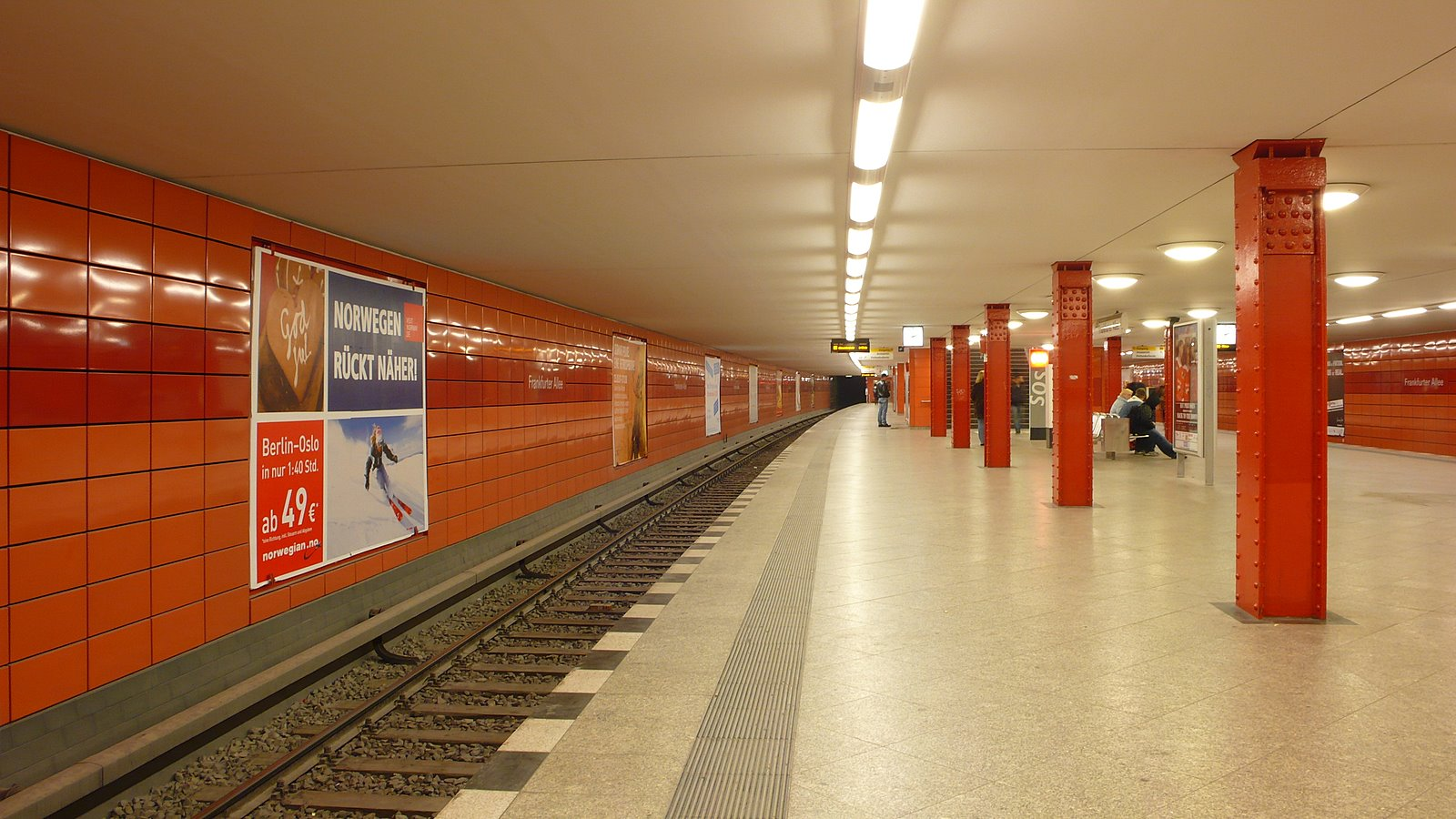

General information
- Location: Frankfurter Allee, Berlin; Friedrichshain
- Owner: Berliner Verkehrsbetriebe
- Operator: Berliner Verkehrsbetriebe
- Platforms: 1 island platform
- Tracks: 2
- Train operators: Berliner Verkehrsbetriebe
- Connections: S41 S42 S8 S85

Construction
- Structure type: Underground

Other information
- Fare zone: VBB: Berlin A/5555

History
- Opened: 21 December 1930; 95 years ago

Services
Preceding station	Berlin U-Bahn	Following station
Samariterstraße towards Berlin Hbf	U5	Magdalenenstraße towards Hönow
Location

Frankfurter Allee is a Berlin U-Bahn station located on the U5 line.

== History ==
The U-Bahn station was opened on 21 December 1930 and called Frankfurter Allee (Ringbahn). This whole of the section of the U5 line that was opened that day was developed by Alfred Grenander. On 8 May 1944, it was hit directly into the ceiling.

Originally the station was red, however it was changed to orange in the restoration of the station in the 1980s. After a second restoration in the 2004 the red colour was restored with new wall tiles. A lift was added between the platform and the level immediately under the street (leaving one flight of stairs to be navigated) and there is direct access from this level to the neighbouring Ring-Centre shopping centre.
