= Warschauer Straße =

Street in Berlin, Germany

Coordinates: 52.51658°N 13.381°E

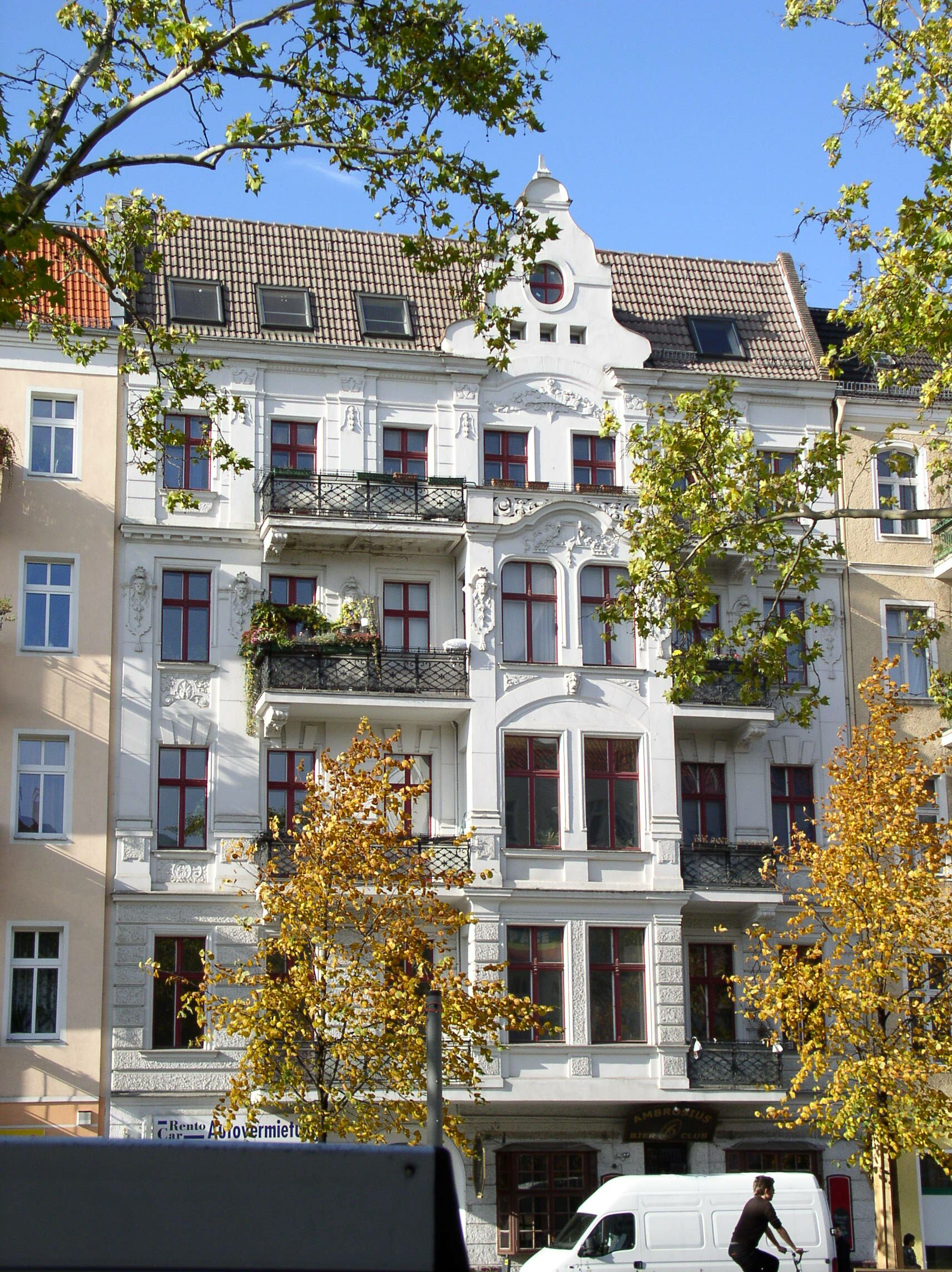
House no. 26 at Warschauer Straße

Warschauer Straße is a major thoroughfare in the Friedrichshain-Kreuzberg district of central Berlin, the capital of Germany. The street begins at Frankfurter Tor to the north and spans 1.6km south to the intersection of the Oberbaumbrücke, Mühlenstraße and Stralauer Allee. The street acts as a section of Bundesstraße 96a and the Berlin Inner Ring Road. The street is named after Warsaw, the capital of Poland.

The Warschauer Straße station, on the city's S-Bahn and U-Bahn rail systems, is located in the southern half of Warschauer Straße. Warschauer Straße station serves a stop on S-Bahn lines S3, S5, S7 and S9 and as the terminus of U-Bahn line U1 and U3.
