= Samariterstraße station =

Station of the Berlin U-Bahn

Coordinates: 52°30′53″N 13°27′52″E

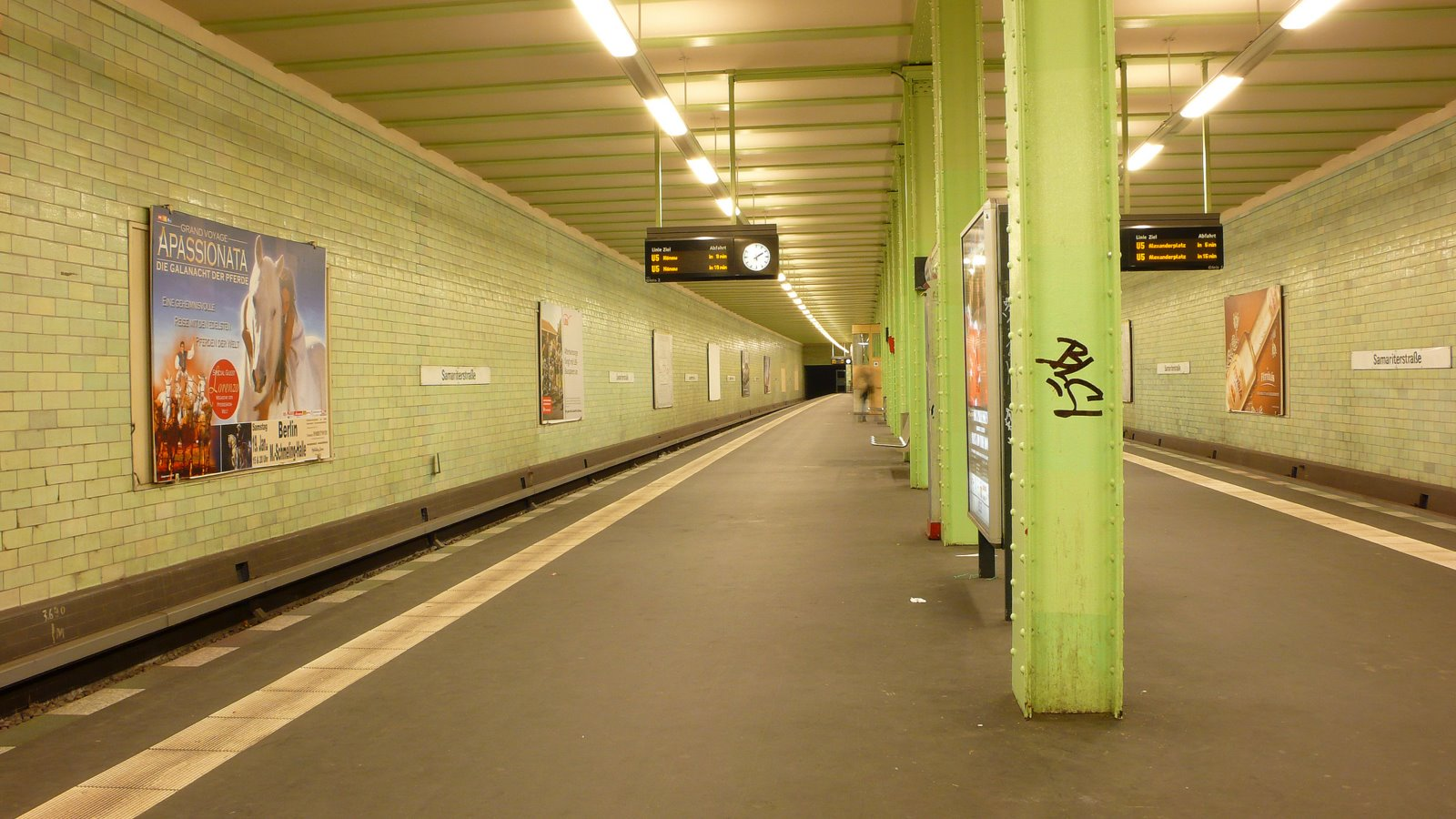
Platform at Samariterstraße U-Bahn station

Samariterstraße is a Berlin U-Bahn station located on the U5. It is located underneath Frankfurter Allee, at the intersection with Samariterstraße in the district of Friedrichshain. It was opened as part of the then-Line E of the Berlin U-Bahn on 21 December 1930. As the station remains almost in its original condition, it is now protected as a historic building.

== History ==
In the Second World War, the station was initially spared damage by bombing. However, early in 1945, the Allied bombing of Berlin intensified. During the night of 9 April 1945, the station was struck by multiple bombs leading to the collapse of its roof along almost its entire length. As well as this damage, in early May 1945 the station was flooded as water entered the U-Bahn system.

Shortly after the end of the war, water was pumped out of the station, and makeshift repairs were made. By 16 June 1945 a provisional shuttle service was running between Petersberger Straße (today Frankfurter Tor) and Friedrichsfelde.

During the GDR the station was covered with pictures of SED propaganda that was removed in 1990, together with Neo-Nazism. After 1993 there were anti-violence ads hanging on the walls, put up after 23-old Silvio Meier was killed in this station by right-wingers. These were all removed during the modernisation programme in 2004. Today there is an official memorial plaque in the underground station commemorating the killed young man. In 2011, an elevator was constructed to provide barrier-free access.

Preceding station	Berlin U-Bahn	Following station
Frankfurter Tor towards Berlin Hbf	U5	Frankfurter Allee towards Hönow
