= Folsom =

Folsom may refer to:

== People ==
- Folsom (surname)

== Places in the United States ==
- Folsom, Perry County, Alabama, an unincorporated community
- Folsom, Randolph County, Alabama, an unincorporated community
- Folsom, California, a city
- Folsom, Georgia, an unincorporated community
- Folsom, Louisiana, a village
- Folsom, Missouri, an unincorporated community
- Folsom, New Jersey, a borough
- Folsom, New Mexico, a village
- Folsom, Ohio, an unincorporated community
- Folsom, Pennsylvania, an unincorporated community
- Folsom, South Dakota, an unincorporated community
- Folsom, Texas, an unincorporated community now part of the city of Amarillo
- Folsom, West Virginia, an unincorporated community
- Folsom, Wisconsin, an unincorporated community within the town of Franklin
- Folsom Lake, California

== Other uses ==
- Folsom Europe, an annual BDSM and leather subculture street fair held in September in Berlin, Germany
- Folsom Field, an outdoor football stadium in Boulder, Colorado
- Folsom Library, research library on the campus of Rensselaer Polytechnic Institute, located in Troy, New York
- Folsom point, prototype of a spearpoint or arrowhead that was invented by Native Americans and widely distributed in North America. First discovered near Folsom, New Mexico
- Folsom Public Library, a library in Folsom, California
- Folsom tradition, name given by archaeologists to a sequence of old Paleo-Indian cultures of central North America
- Folsom site, archaeological site in northeastern New Mexico where Folsom Points were first discovered
- Folsom State Prison, a high-security penitentiary near the town of Folsom, California
  - Johnny Cash at Folsom Prison, a live country & western music album recorded at the prison in 1968
- Folsom Street Fair, held at the end of September during San Francisco's Leather Pride Week
- Folsom Lake College (FLC) is a comprehensive public community college in California
