= Christopher Street Day =

Annual LGBT event in Germany and Switzerland

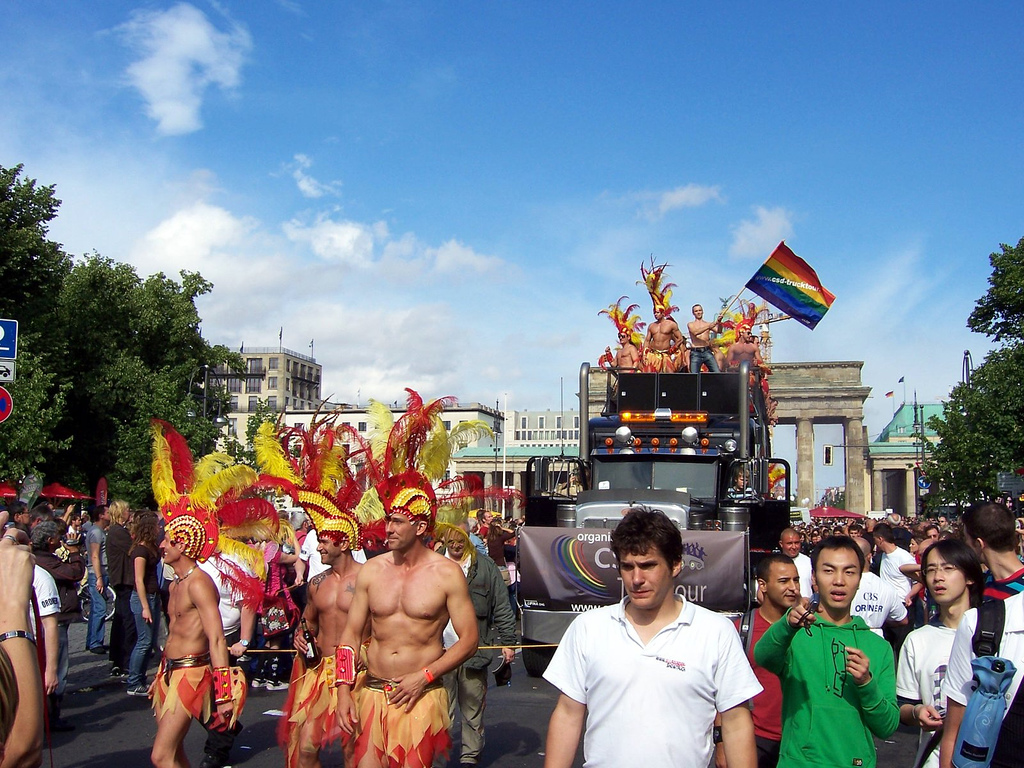
CSD in Berlin or Berlin Pride. 2007

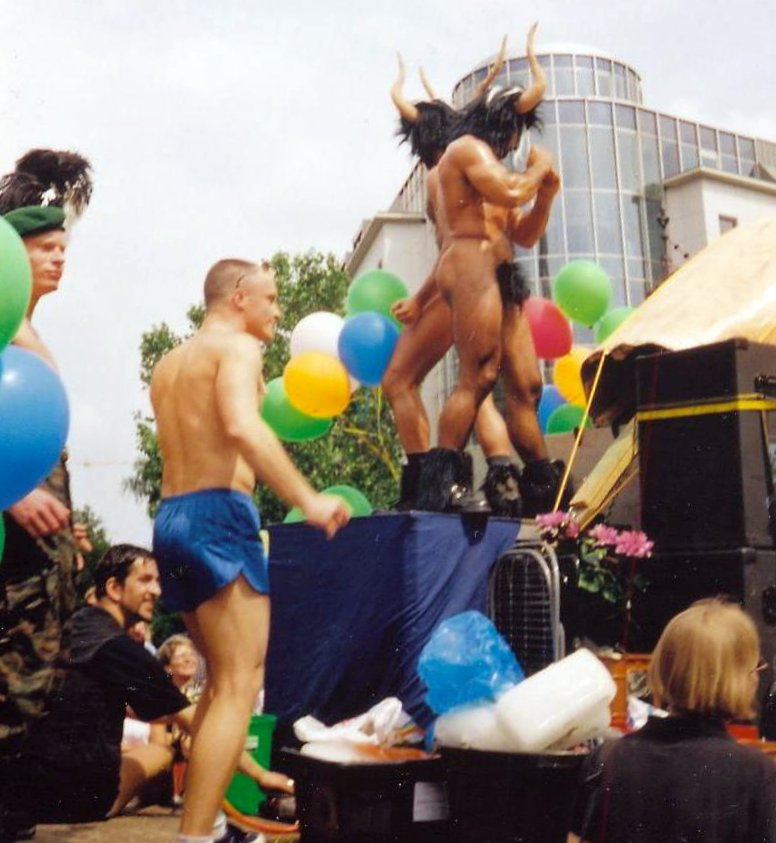
Dancers on a float at the 1998 CSD in Berlin.

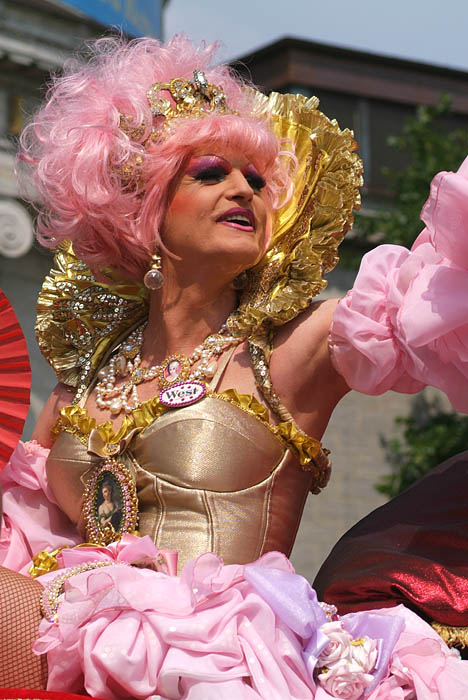
Drag Queen Olivia Jones in CSD Hamburg. 2007

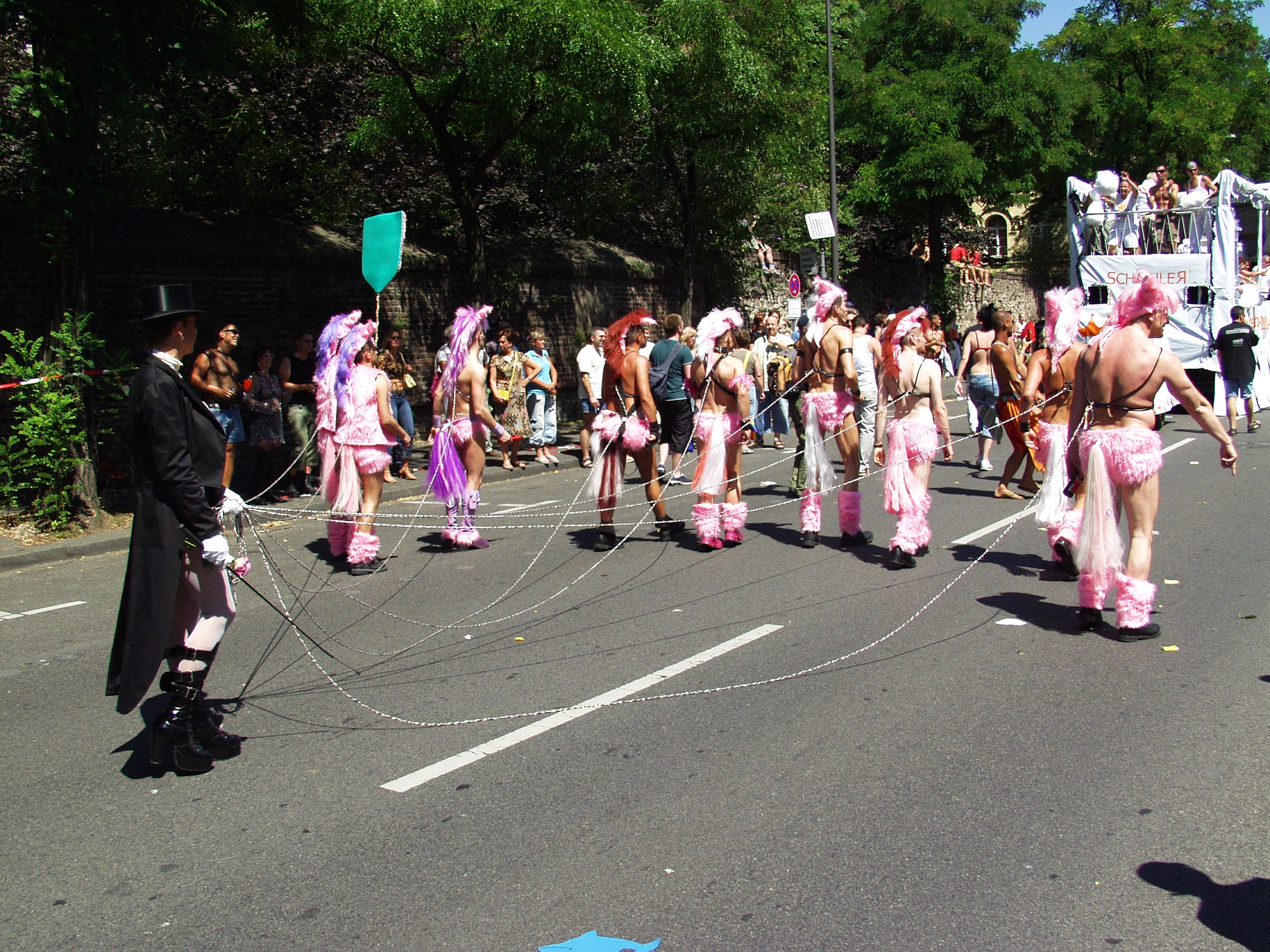
Members of the Cologne CSD 2006

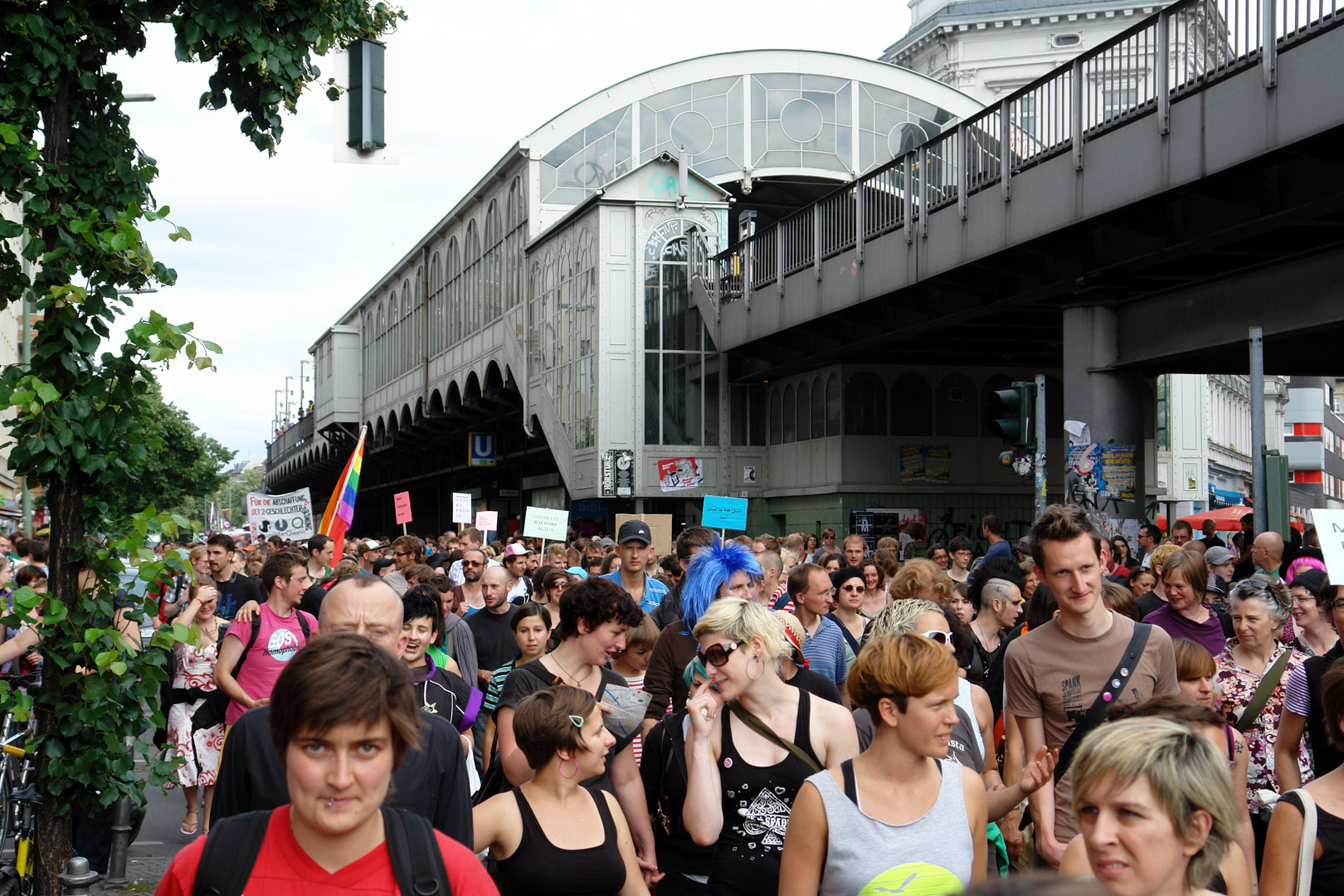
Kreuzberg Pride 2009

Christopher Street Day (CSD) are annual LGBTQ+ Pride events in Germany and Switzerland taking place between June and August. The most prominent CSD events are Berlin Pride, CSD Hamburg, and ColognePride in Germany, and CSD Zürich in Switzerland.

== History ==
The CSD is held in memory of the Stonewall riots, the first big uprising of LGBT people against police assaults that took place at the Stonewall Inn, a bar on Manhattan, New York City's Christopher Street in the district of Greenwich Village on June 28, 1969.

On Saturday, June 27, 1970, marches to mark the first anniversary of Stonewall were held in Chicago and San Francisco, followed on Sunday, June 28, 1970, by the Christopher Street Liberation Day Parade in New York and the Christopher Street West Association Parade in Los Angeles; the four gatherings were the first Pride parades in United States history. To accommodate the interests of the many different groups participating, the Christopher Street Liberation Day Committee named the days leading up to the march Gay Pride Week. Pride Month is now celebrated internationally in June.

The first German Christopher Street Day took place in Berlin on June 30, 1979 with 450 demonstrators. It subsequently spread to other cities throughout Germany.

== Current situation ==
CSD Berlin started in 1979. Now almost every large city in Germany celebrates CSD, with the largest in Berlin (Berlin Pride), Hamburg (Hamburg Pride) and Cologne (Cologne Pride). When Cologne hosted Europride in 2002, it attracted 1.4 million participants and spectators to the city.

Christopher Street Day events do not always take place on the historic date of June 27, but on different weekends between June and August. CSD events often include demonstrations, parades, and street fairs. A typical Christopher Street Day Parade includes floats as well as walking groups usually provided by and made up of members of LGBT organizations.

CSD events have been described as having a festive party atmosphere. It is typical to see many drag queens, drag kings, and other people colorfully dressed. BDSM enthusiasts also often participate in CSDs. In addition to the Parade and the final rallies, in many cities there are days or up to whole weeks of street festivals and cultural events with artists, political events, lectures, readings, parties and other festivities.

== Similar events ==
In Berlin, Kreuzberg Pride (also known as Kreuzberger CSD, "Transgenialer" CSD or X*CSD), an alternative CSD event that centered on radical politics, ran from 1998 to 2013. This event spotlights issues such as refugees, drug treatment, housing and gentrifiation.

== Politicians attending ==
Politicians often participate in CSDs, including:

- Federal Foreign Minister and Vice Chancellor Joschka Fischer (Cologne, 2002, Hamburg 2004, Cologne 2005)
- Federal Minister Renate Künast (Berlin 2001)
- Former Governing Mayor of Berlin Klaus Wowereit (since 2001)
- Mayor of Frankfurt Petra Roth (2004)
- Prime Minister of Hesse Roland Koch (Frankfurt am Main)
- President of the German Bundestag Wolfgang Thierse (Berlin 2000)

In some cities, politicians are also patrons of the CSD, for example in Hamburg, the former First Mayor Ortwin Runde, and Ole von Beust, in Dresden Mayor Ingolf Rossberg, in Würzburg Claudia Roth, in Munich the former Mayors Christian Ude and Dieter Reiter and in Brunswick, the former Federal Minister Jürgen Trittin.

== CSD hosts in Germany ==
Over 150 cities in Germany hold annual CSD events, with the most prominent ones being in Berlin, Hamburg, and Cologne.

== Gallery ==
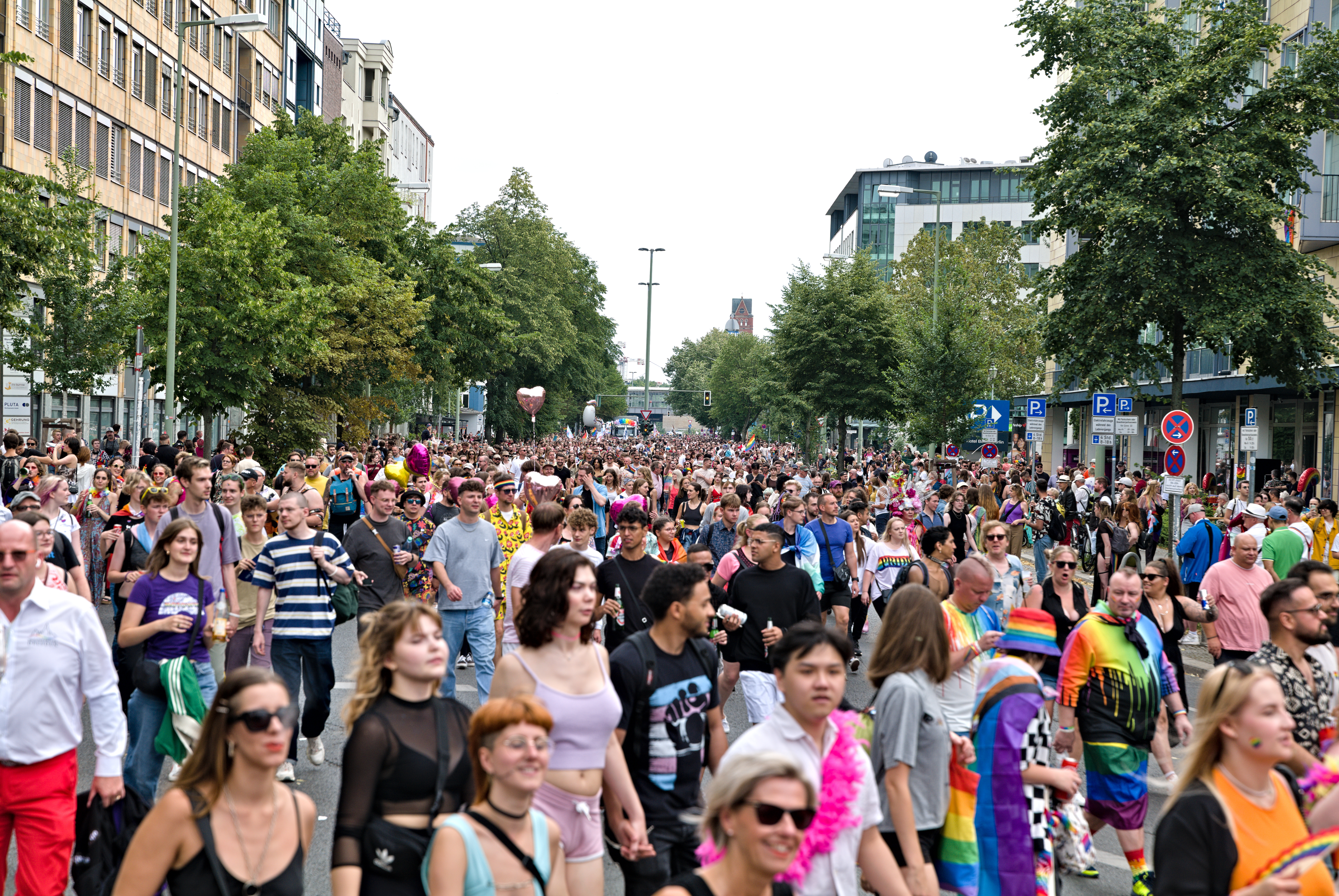
Christopher Street Day parade on Helmut Kohl Avenue in Berlin. 2023.

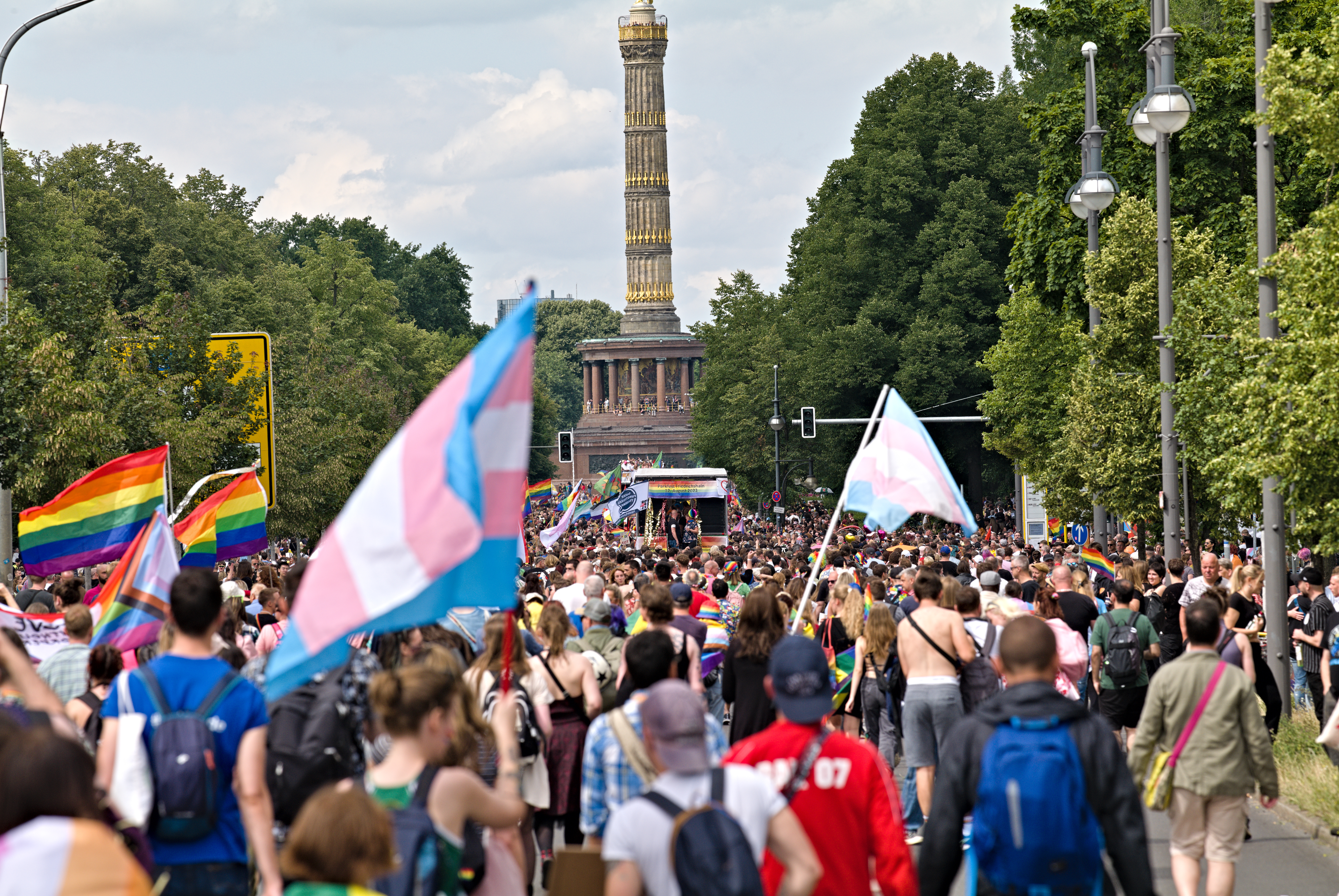
Transgender flags at the Christopher Street Day parade, in Berlin. 2023.

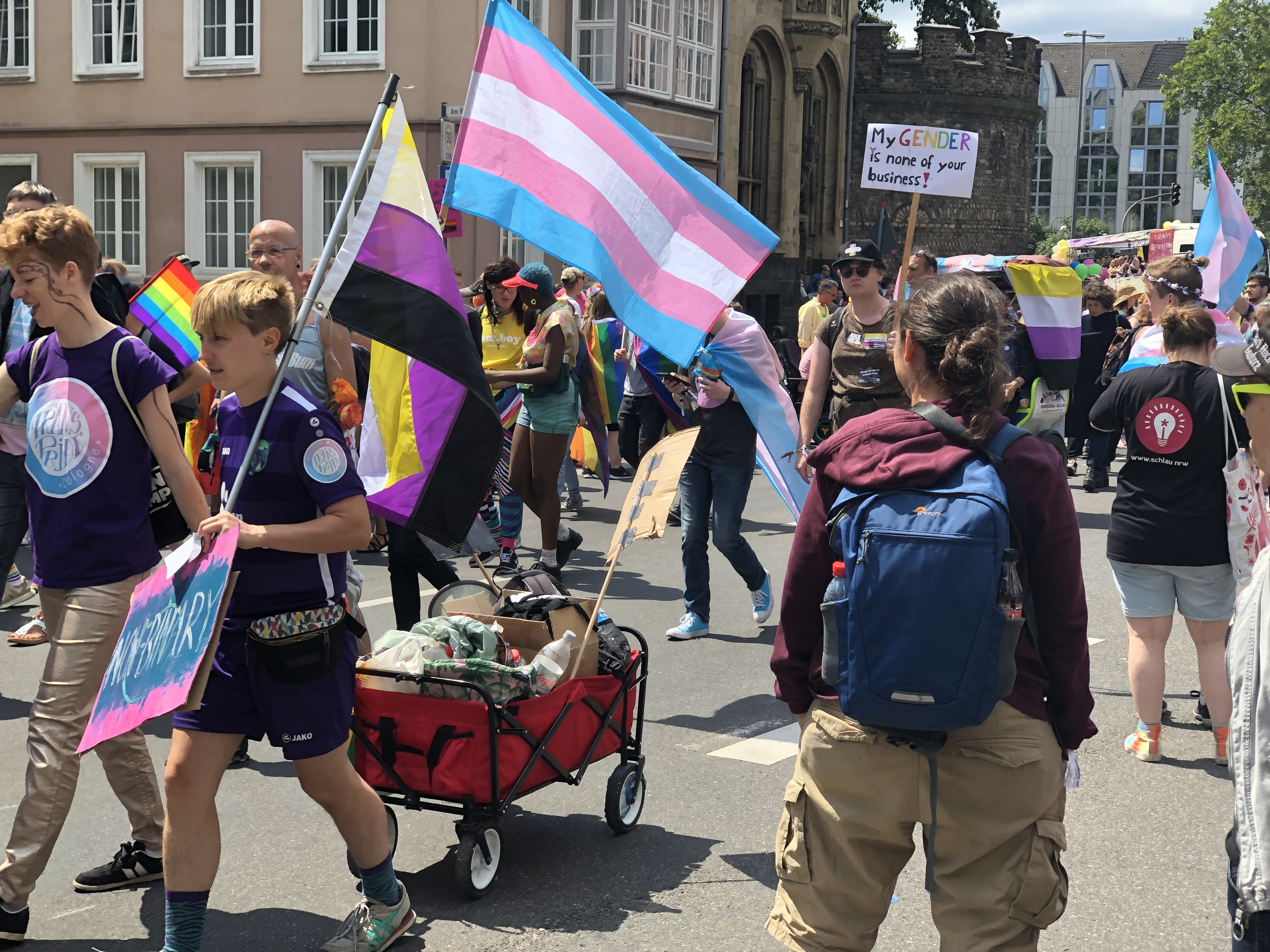
Non-binary flags at the Christopher Street Day parade in Cologne, 2019

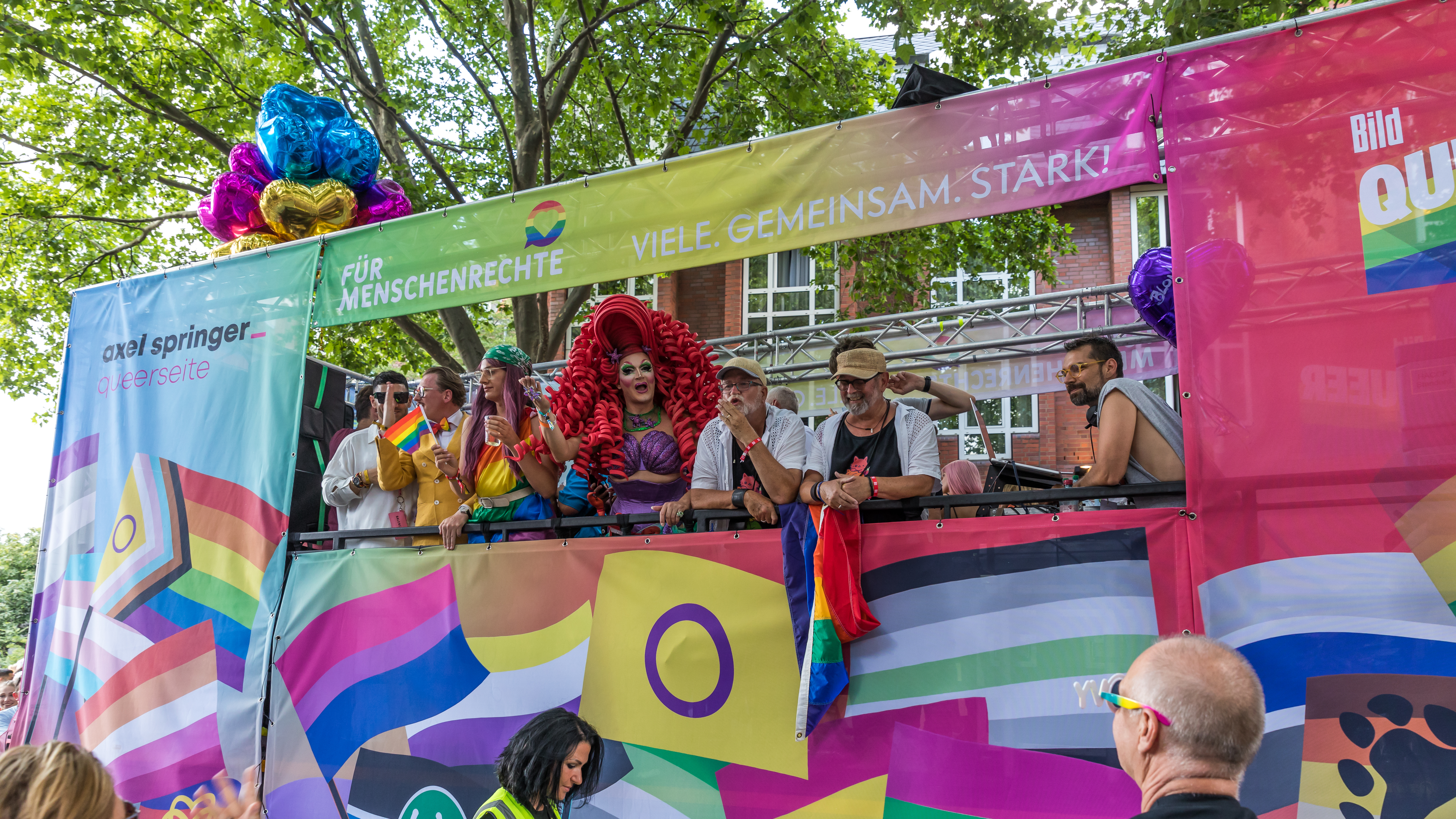
Christopher Street Day parade in Cologne, 2022.

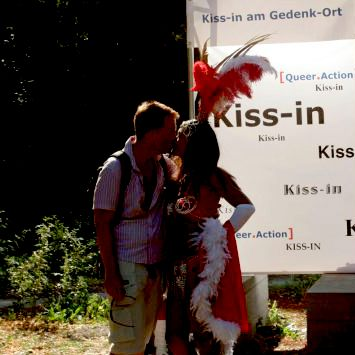
A "Kiss In", in Berlin 2006

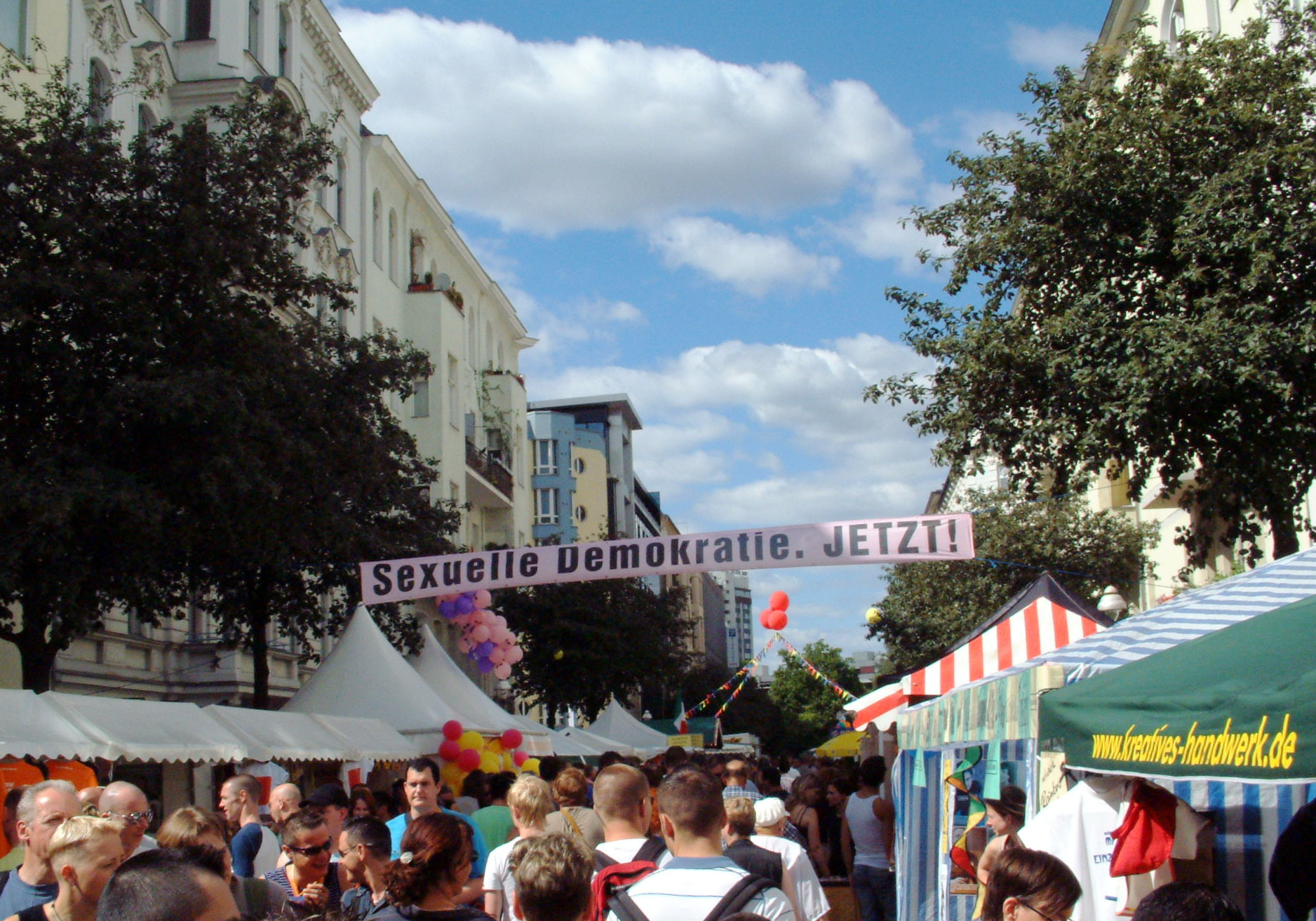
Lesbian and Gay City Festival or Lesbisch-schwules Stadtfest Berlin. 2006

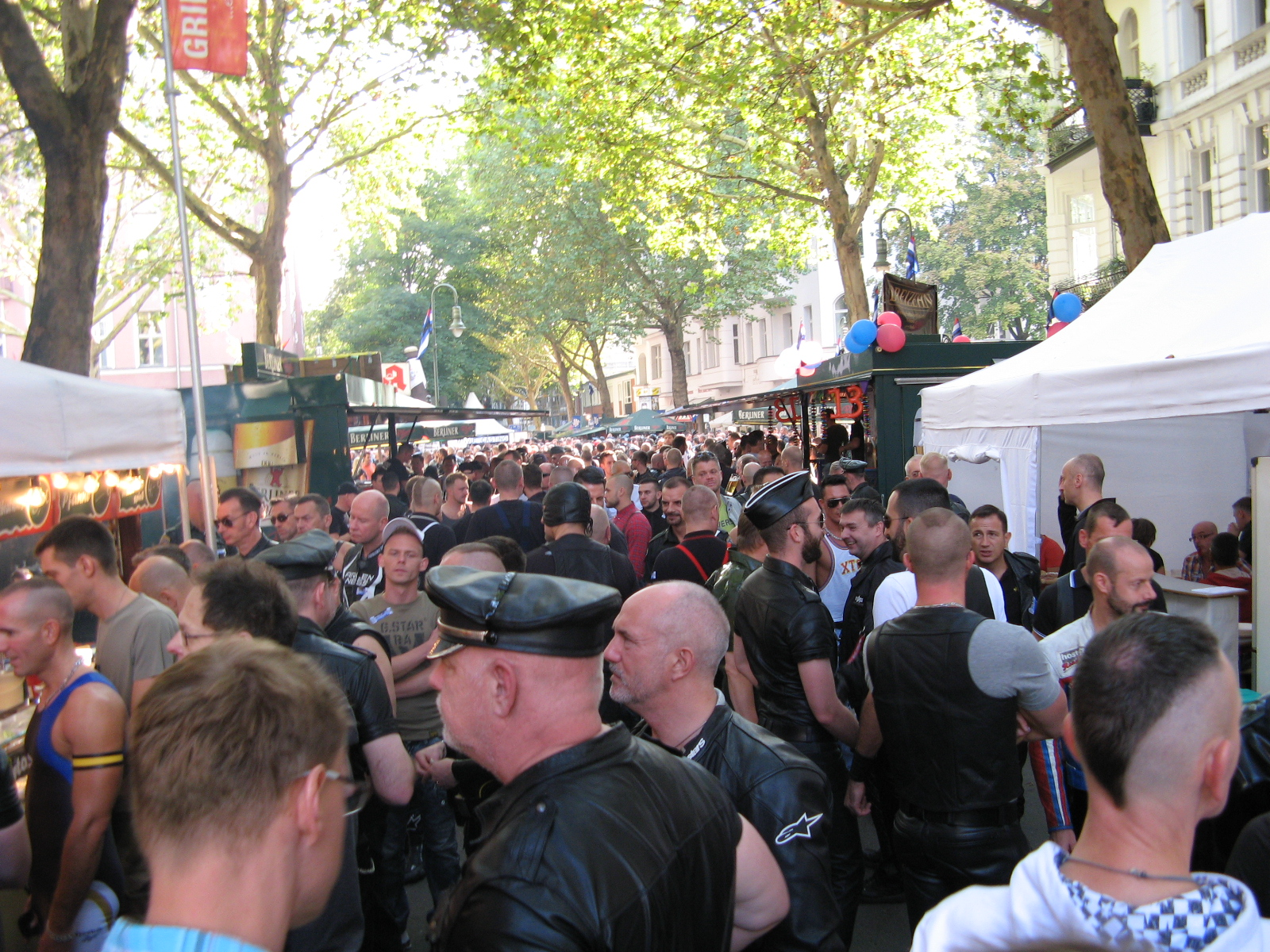
Folsom Europe Street Festival, Fuggerstrasse, Berlin 2013.

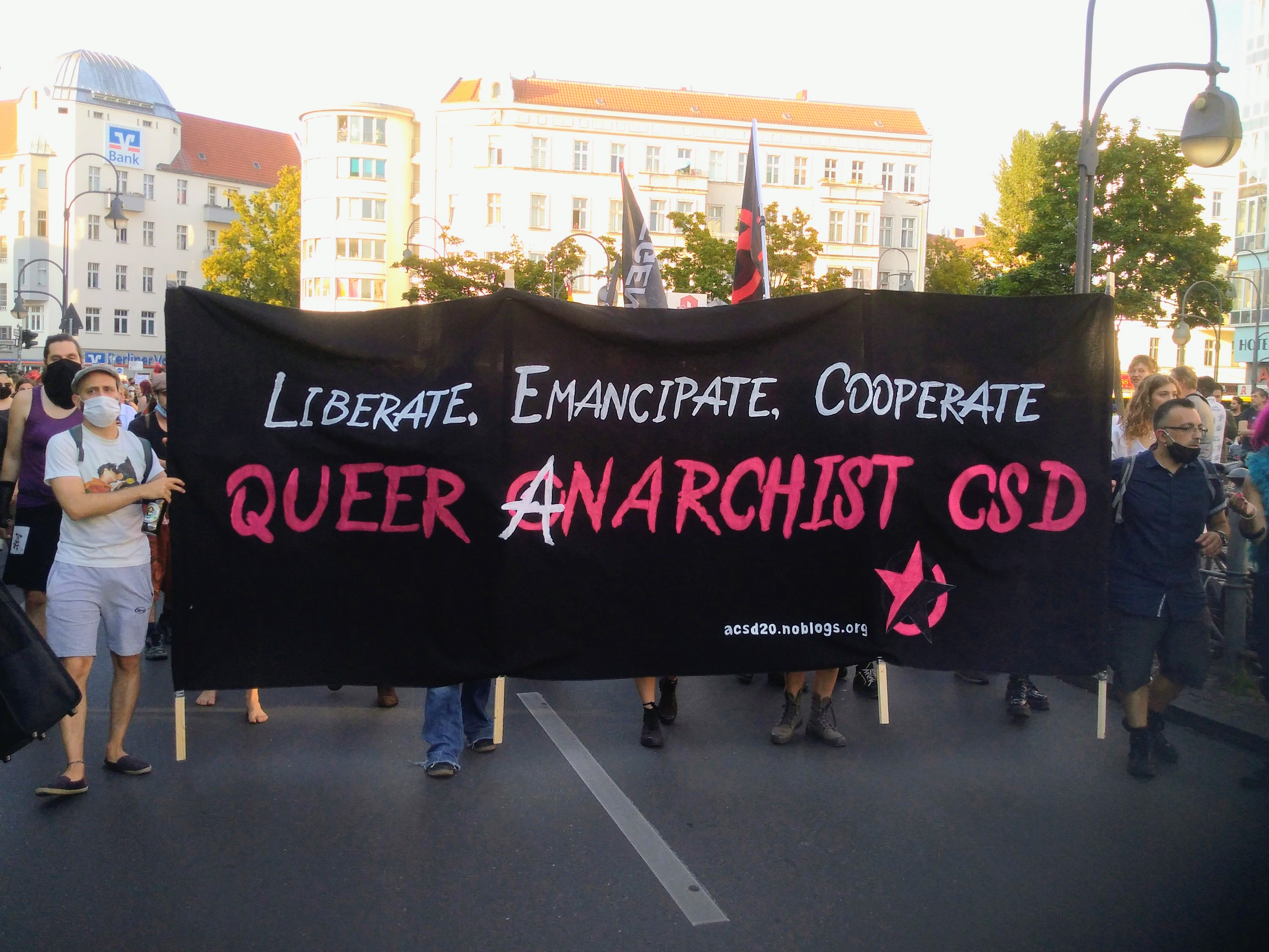
Queer anarchist banner at Christopher Street Day parade, Berlin, 2020

== See also ==
- EuroPride
- Gay pride
- List of gay pride events
- John Paul Hudson
