= Folsom station =

Folsom station may refer to:

- Folsom Depot, a historic train station in Folsom, California
- Historic Folsom station, a light rail station in Folsom, California
- Folsom station (Muni Metro), a light rail station in San Francisco, California

== See also ==
- Folsom (disambiguation)
