= Hamburg Pride =

Annual LGBT event in Hamburg, Germany

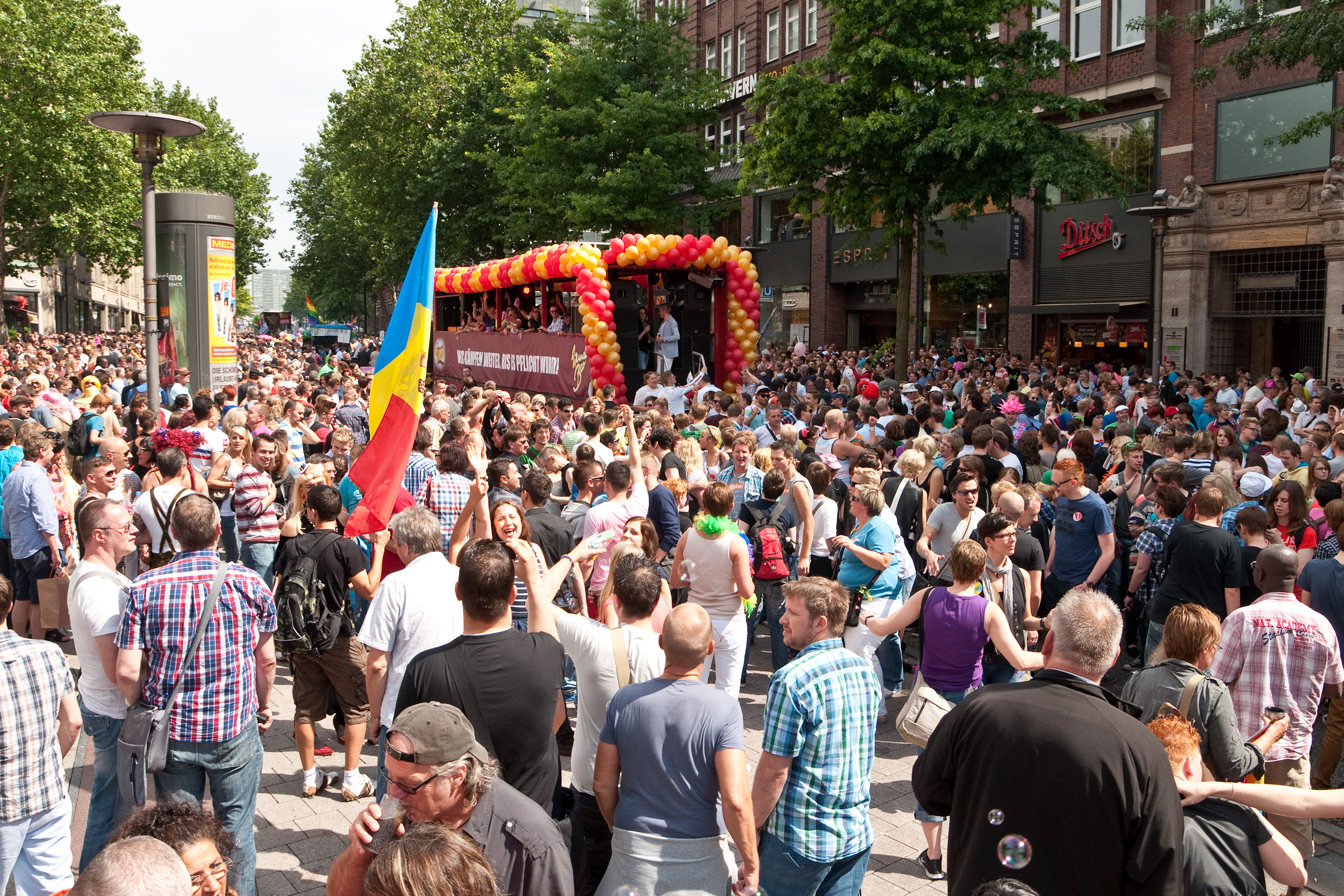
Christopher Street Day in Hamburg 2012

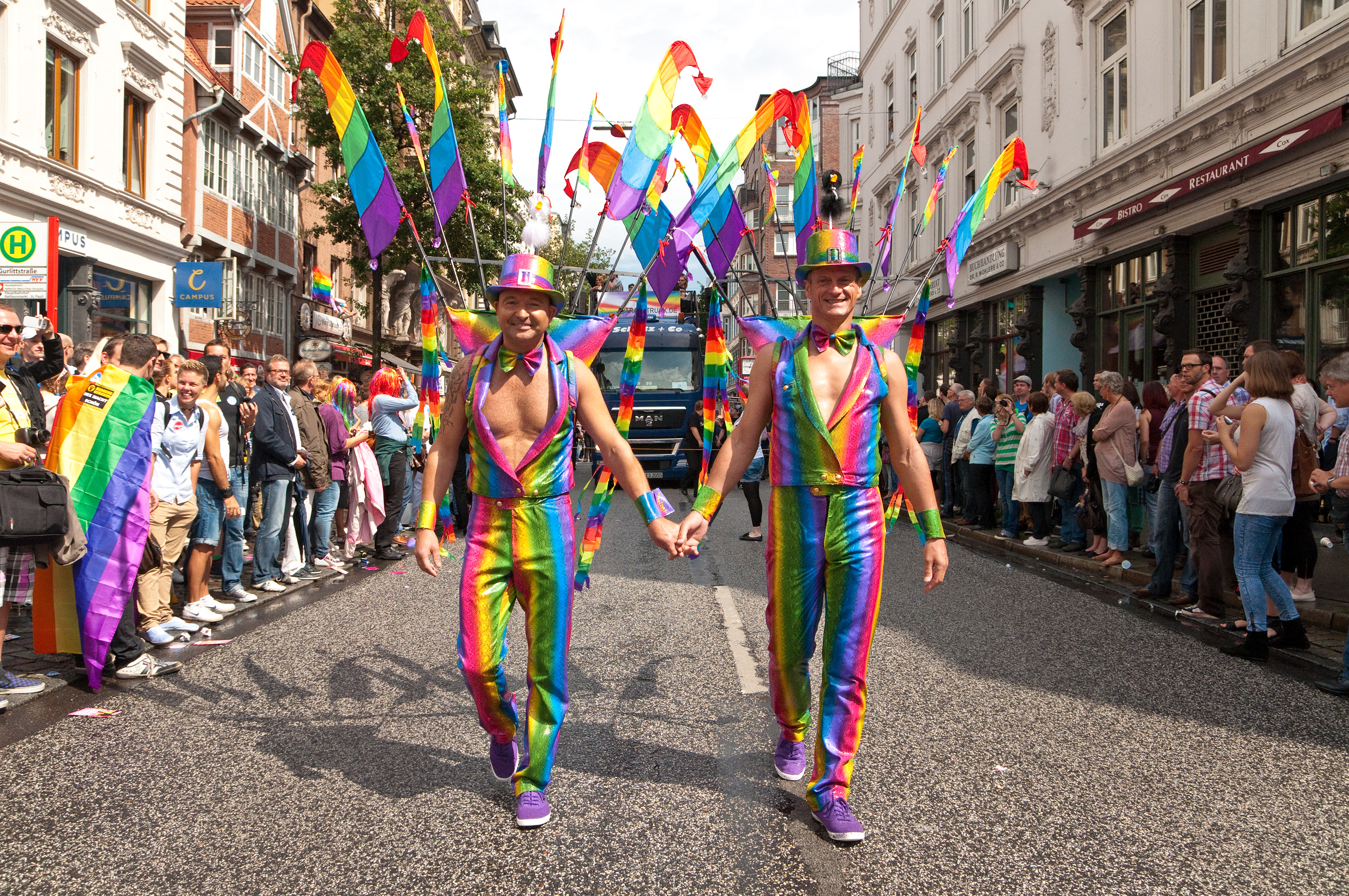
Hamburg Pride at Lange Reihe

The Hamburg Pride Celebration, usually known as CSD Hamburg, is a parade and festival held at the end of July each year in Hamburg to celebrate the lesbian, gay, bisexual, and transgender (LGBTQ) people and their allies, as part of international LGBTQ pride and Christopher Street Day festivities. Since 1980, the event has been held each year. Hamburg Pride is one of the many gay and lesbian organized event in Hamburg. Its aim is to demonstrate for equal rights and equal treatment for LGBT people, as well as celebrate the pride in Gay and Lesbian Culture.

== Hamburg Pride Events ==
CSD Hamburg comprises several events as Pride Night, Pride House, Pride Parade and the Pride Street Festival at Lange Reihe Street in the Gay village St. Georg. Other Pride festivals in Hamburg are the Harbour Pride in May, the Leather Pride in August and the Winter Pride in November / December. Europride was hosted by Hamburg in 2004 and about 360,000 people marched in the parade.

== See also ==
- LGBT rights in Germany
- Berlin Pride
