= Folsom (surname) =

Folsom is a surname. Notable people with the surname include:

- Abby Folsom (died 1867), American feminist and abolitionist
- Allan Folsom (1941–2014), American motion picture cameraman, editor, writer, and producer
- Amanda Folsom (born 1979), American mathematician
- Augustine H. Folsom (died 1926), photographer
- Beth Folsom, American politician
- Burton W. Folsom, Jr. (born 1947), American historian and author. Wrote The Myth of the Robber Barons
- David Folsom (born 1947), US District Court Judge
- Frances Folsom Cleveland Preston (1864–1947), who married the President of the United States, Grover Cleveland
- Frank M. Folsom (1894–1970), electronics company executive
- Franklin Folsom (1907–1995), children's author and labor activist
- Fred Folsom (1871–1944), American football coach at the University of Colorado (1895–1915) and Dartmouth College (1903–1906)
- George Folsom (1802–1869), American antiquarian, librarian, diplomat, lawyer and politician
- Harriet Amelia Folsom (1838–1910), American pioneer and political influencer; 51st plural wife of Brigham Young
- J. D. Folsom (born 1984), American football linebacker
- Jim Folsom, Sr. (1908–1987), American Democratic Governor of Alabama
- Jim Folsom, Jr. (born 1949), former American Democratic Governor of Alabama, and who also served as the Lieutenant Governor both before and after that
- Jonathan P. Folsom (1820–1893), twentieth Mayor of Lowell, Massachusetts
- Joseph Libbey Folsom (1817–1855), U.S. Army officer and real estate investor
- Justus Watson Folsom (1871–1936), American entomologist
- Marion B. Folsom (1893–1976), U.S. Secretary of Health, Education, and Welfare
- Nathaniel Folsom (1726–1790), American merchant and statesman
- Richard G. Folsom (1907–1996), twelfth president of Rensselaer Polytechnic Institute
- Robert Folsom (1927–2017), American businessman and politician
- Steve Folsom (born 1958), player with the National Football League
- Tom Folsom (born 1974), writer living in New York
- William H. Folsom (1815–1901), American architect and contractor
