= Easter Berlin =

Leather and fetish event in Berlin, Germany

Coordinates: 52°29′57″N 13°21′14″E

Easter in Berlin
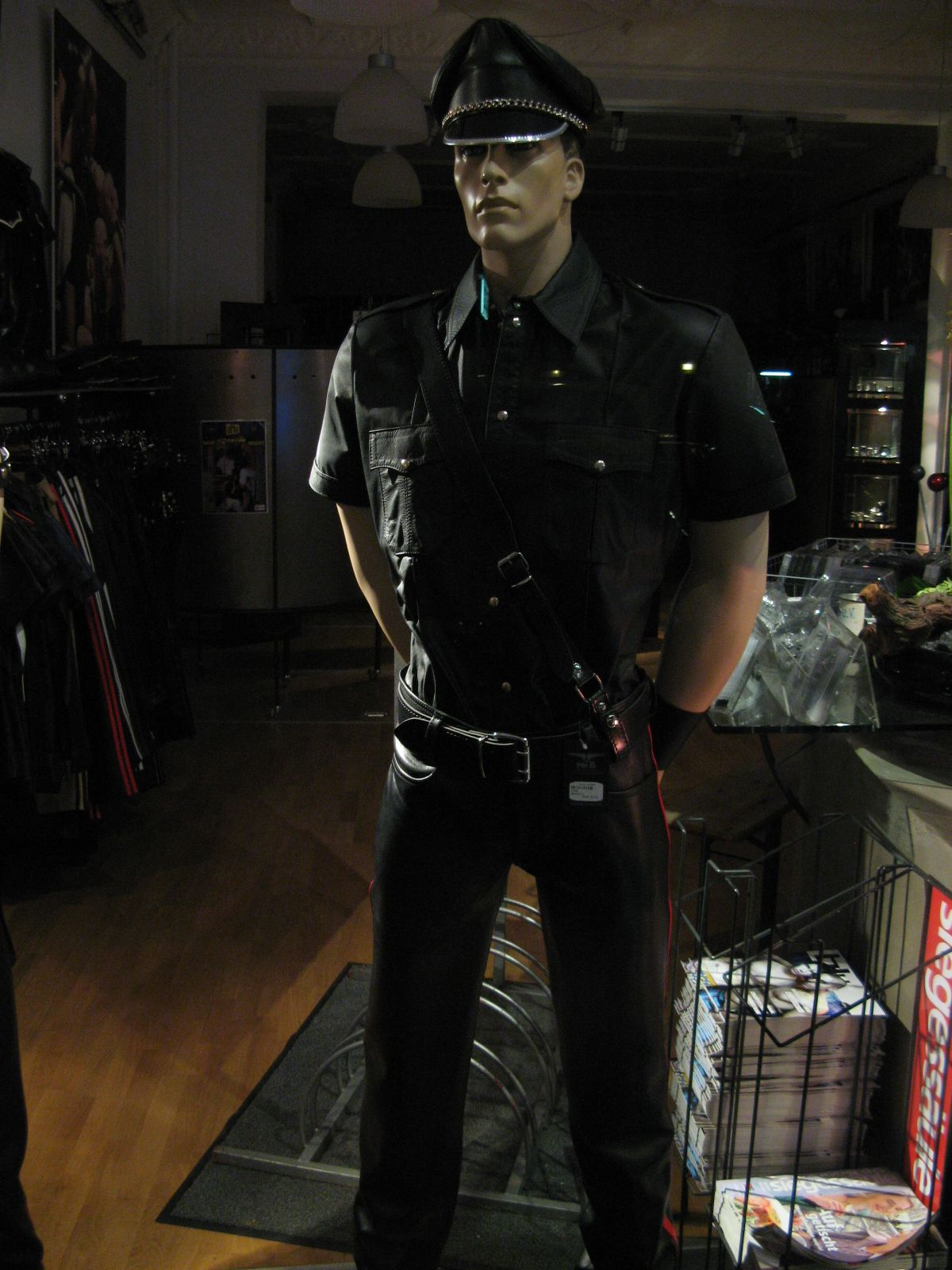
- One of many fetish shops in the Schöneberg neighborhood of Berlin
- Genre: BDSM, leather, fetish
- Begins: 1972; 54 years ago
- Frequency: annual, at Easter holiday (March or April)
- Locations: Schöneberg, Berlin, Germany
- Website: easterberlin.de

Easter in Berlin, also known as Easter Berlin, founded in 1972, is one of the biggest leather and fetish events in Europe. It takes place in Berlin every year at Easter (March or April).

== History ==
The meeting is organized by the members of the club BLF, Berlin Leder und Fetisch e.V. (English: Berlin Leather and Fetish).

Each year thousands of Leather-, Rubber-, Sportswear-, Skin- and Uniformlovers from all over the World come together to join different kinds of fetish events in Berlin. In the past, this event has elected their titleholder, German Mr Leather on Easter Sunday.

The centre of Easter in Berlin is at Nollendorfplatz, a gay and queer neighborhood in the Western part of Berlin.

The autumn leather and fetish event Folsom Europe is also held annually in the same neighborhood.

More gay festivals in Berlin include Berlin Pride and Kreuzberg Pride.

Easter in Berlin event

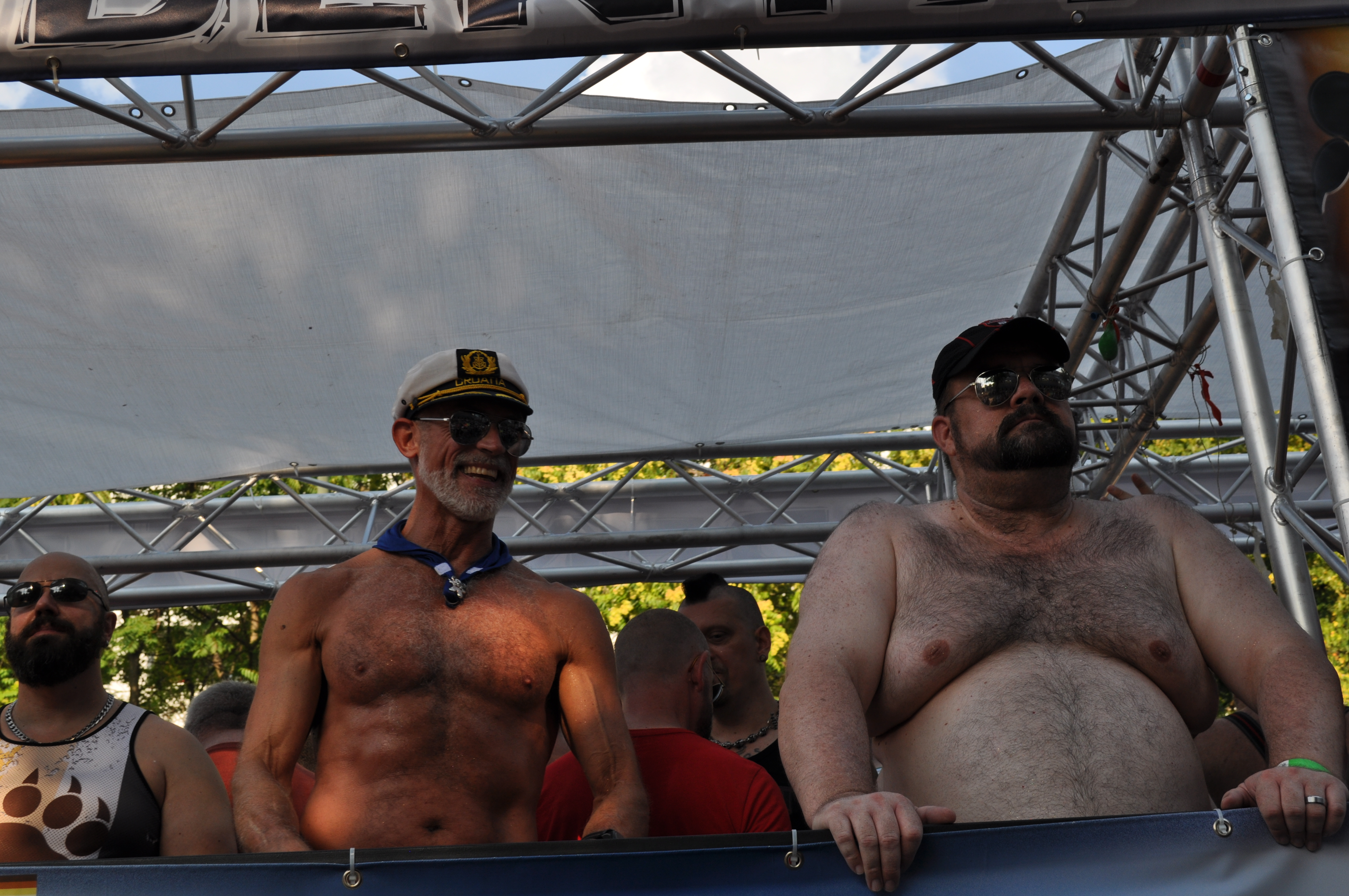
Easter Berlin (2018)

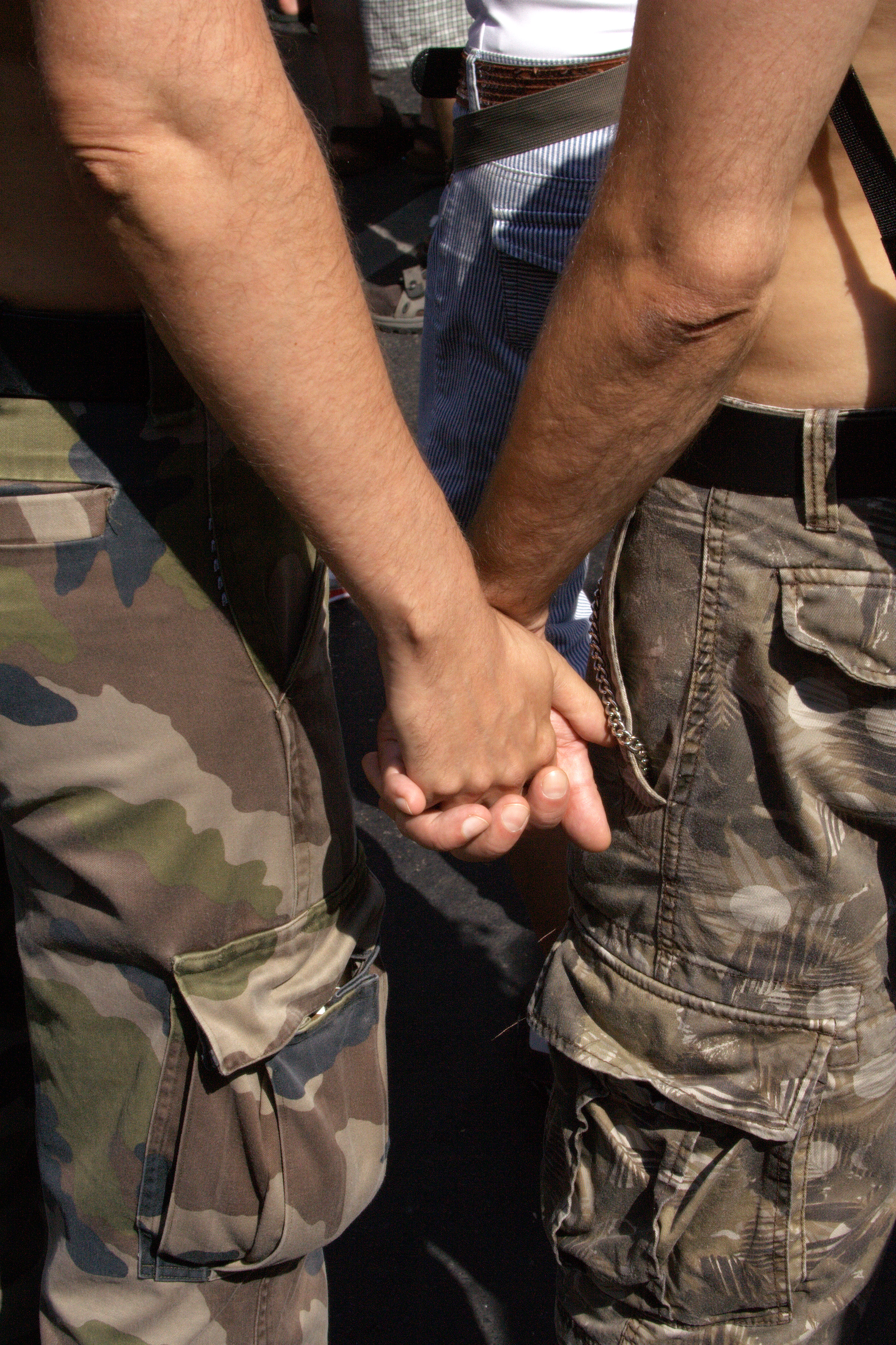
Gay couple in Berlin

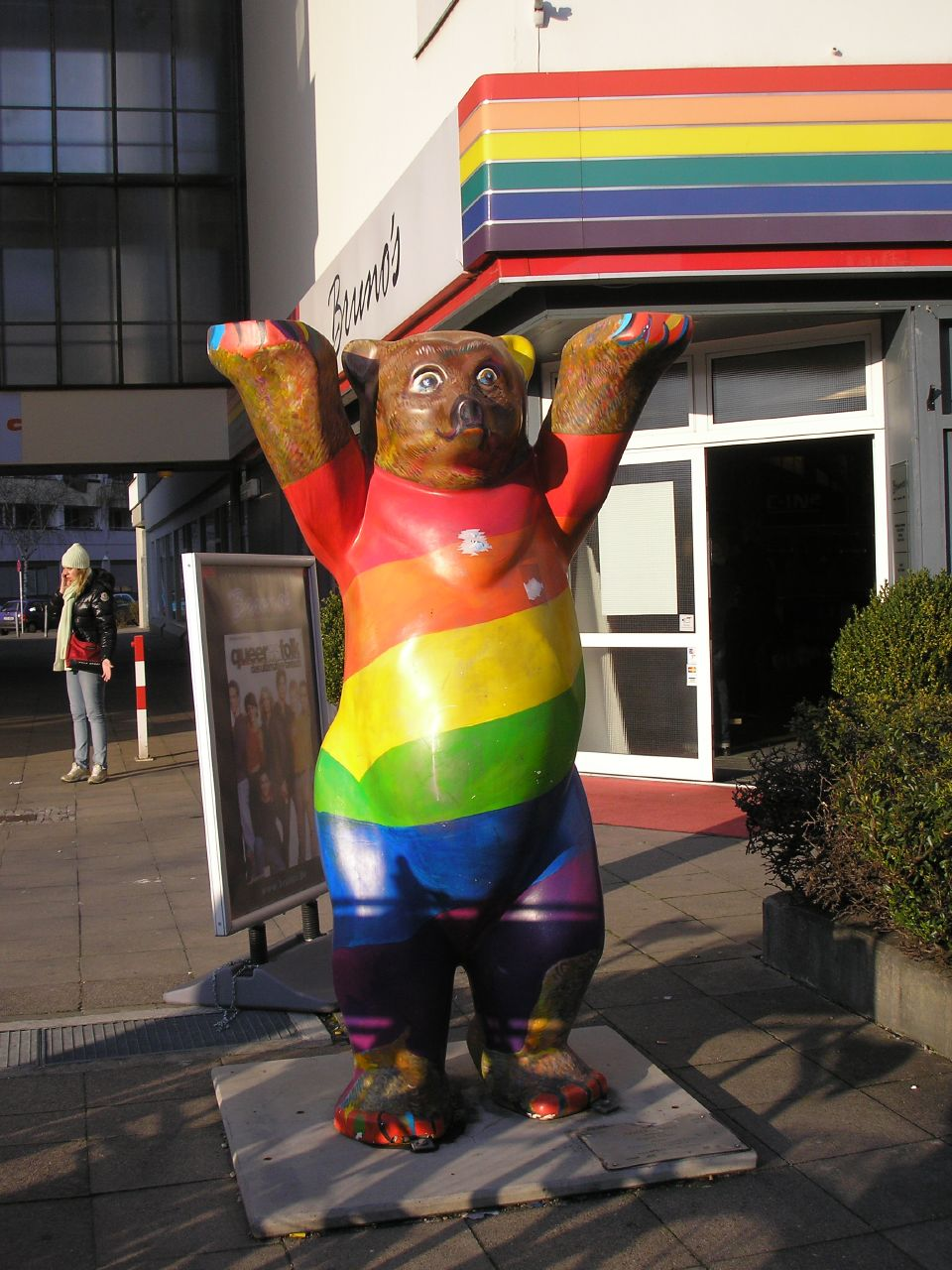
Gay Bear at Nollendorfplatz, Berlin

== See also ==
- Lesbian and Gay City Festival (Berlin)
