= Folsom Europe =

Fetish street fair

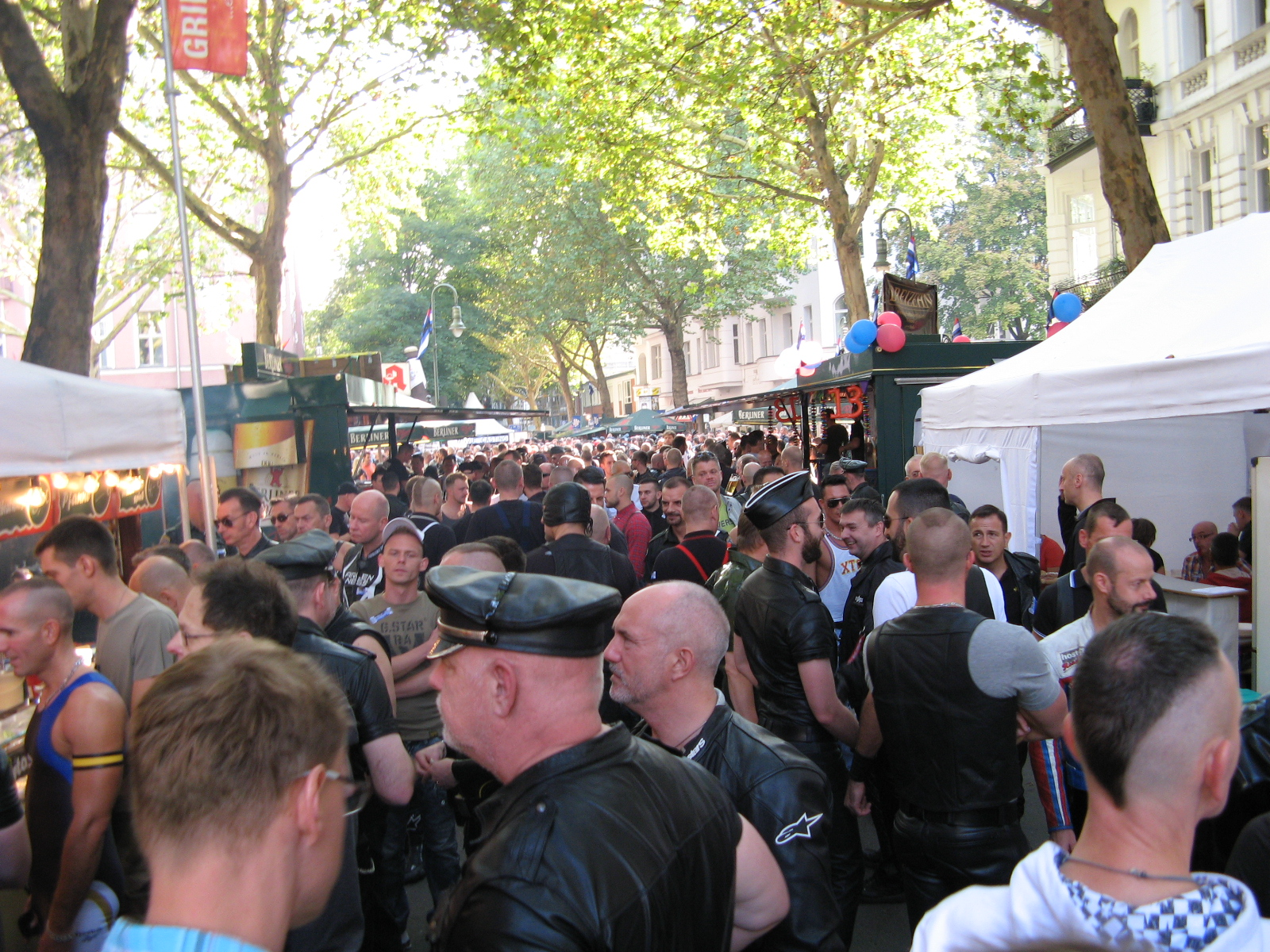
- Folsom Europe (2013) on Fuggerstrasse, in Berlin
- Genre: BDSM, fetish, leather
- Begins: 2003; 23 years ago
- Frequency: annual, in September
- Locations: Schöneberg, Berlin, Germany
- Website: folsomeurope.berlin

Folsom Europe, also known as Folsom Straßenfest (English: Folsom Street Fest), is an annual BDSM and leather subculture street fair held in September in Berlin, Germany since 2003.

== History ==
Folsom Europe was established in 2003, in order to bring to Europe the non-profit leather festival concept pioneered by the Folsom Street Fair in San Francisco, California.

Today this is one of the biggest gay fetish events in Europe together with the Berlin Leder und Fetisch e.V. (or BLF, English: Berlin Leather and Fetish) hosted Easter Berlin which is held every Easter holiday. The main area for the two fetish festivals is in Schöneberg. The Folsom Europe street festival is at Fuggerstrasse and Welserstrasse, close to Wittenbergplatz.

Folsom Europe is also the backdrop for the annual German Titleholders' Conference, an event which brings together fetish titleholders from all over the world to meet and collect money for charitable organisations in Berlin. Fundraising is an important part of this fetish street party, as it is the only event in Europe where the nuns from the Order of the Sisters of Perpetual Indulgence stand at the gates to collect funds from visitors.

Folsom Europe

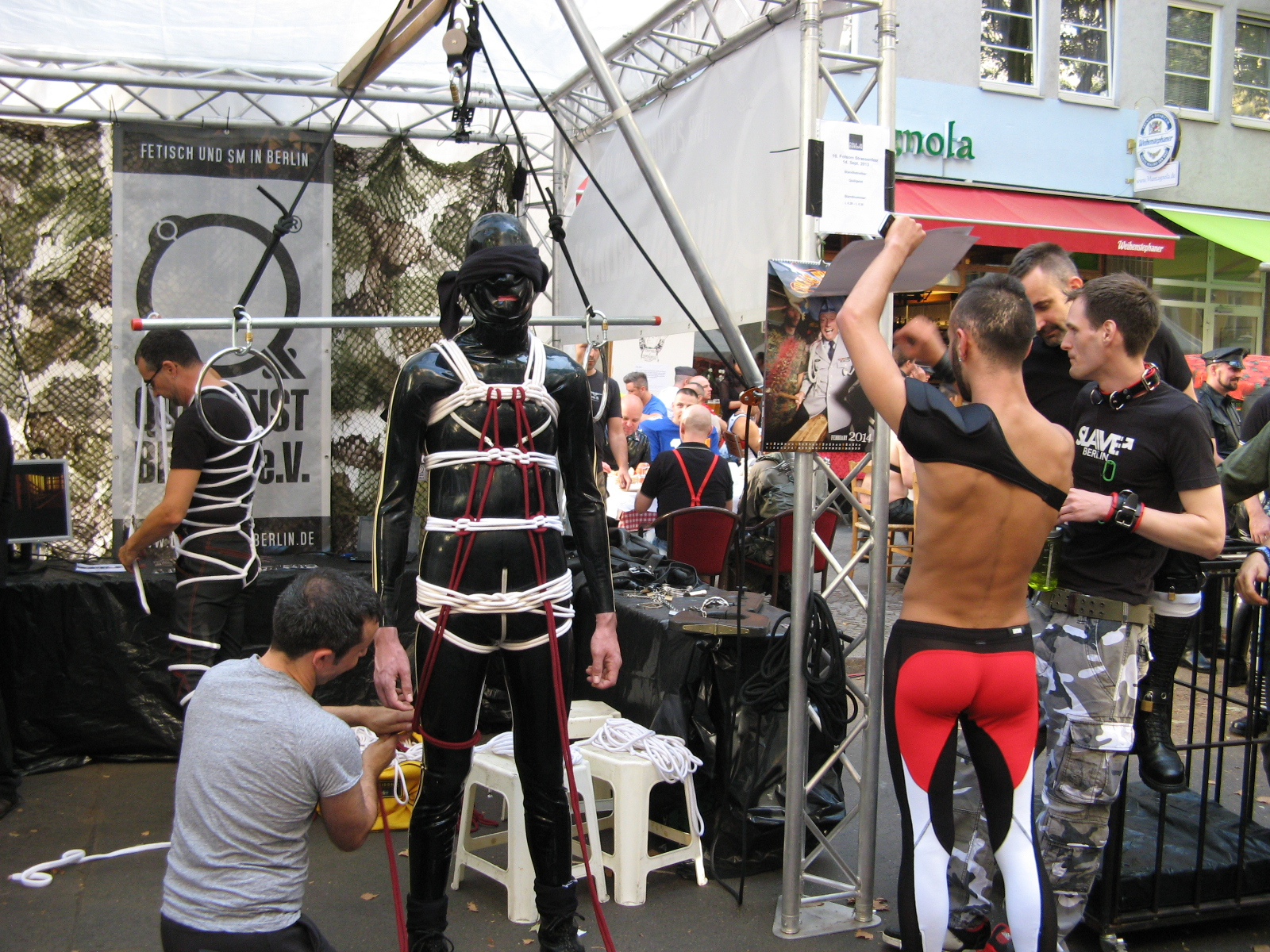
2013

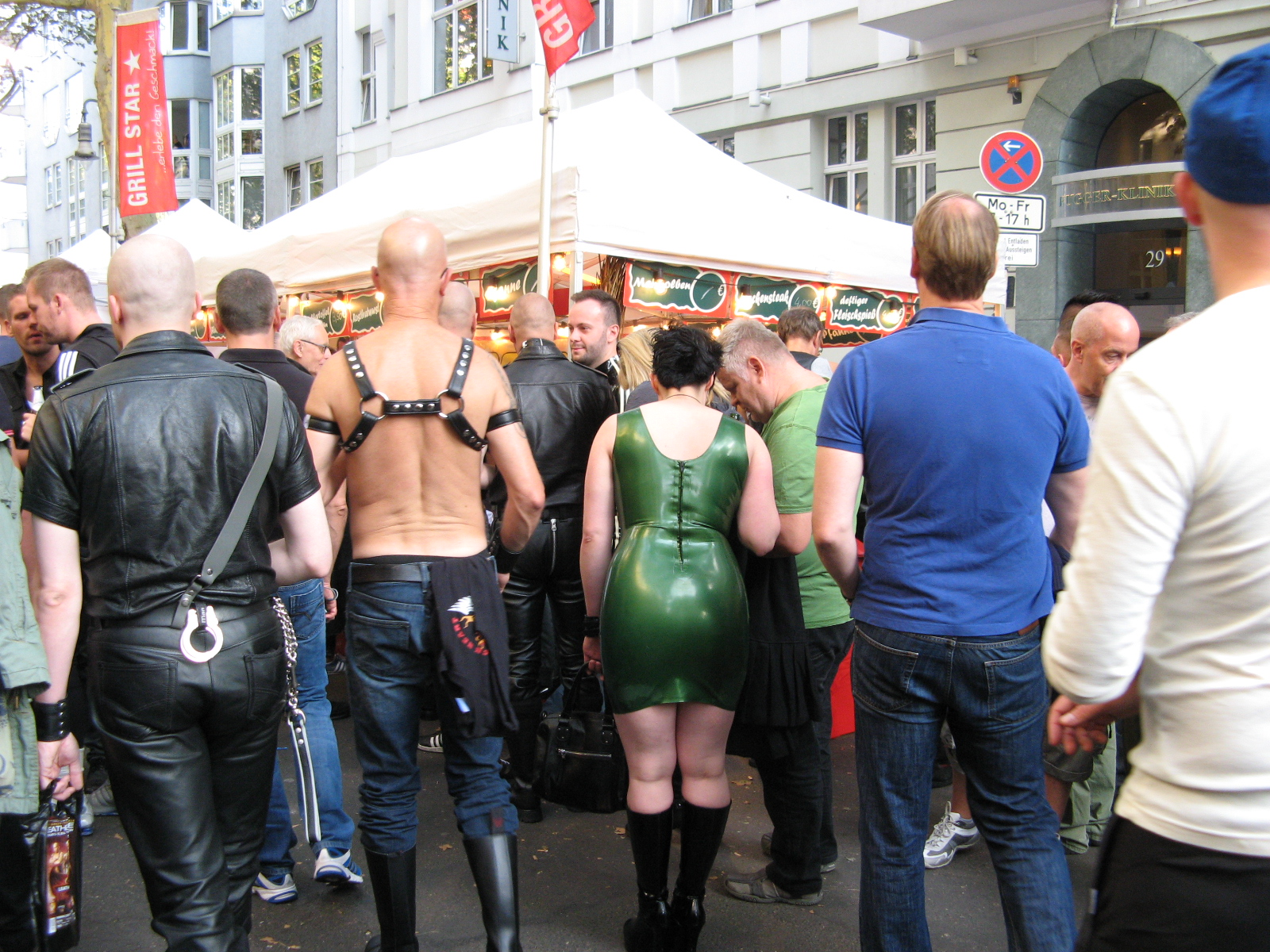
2013

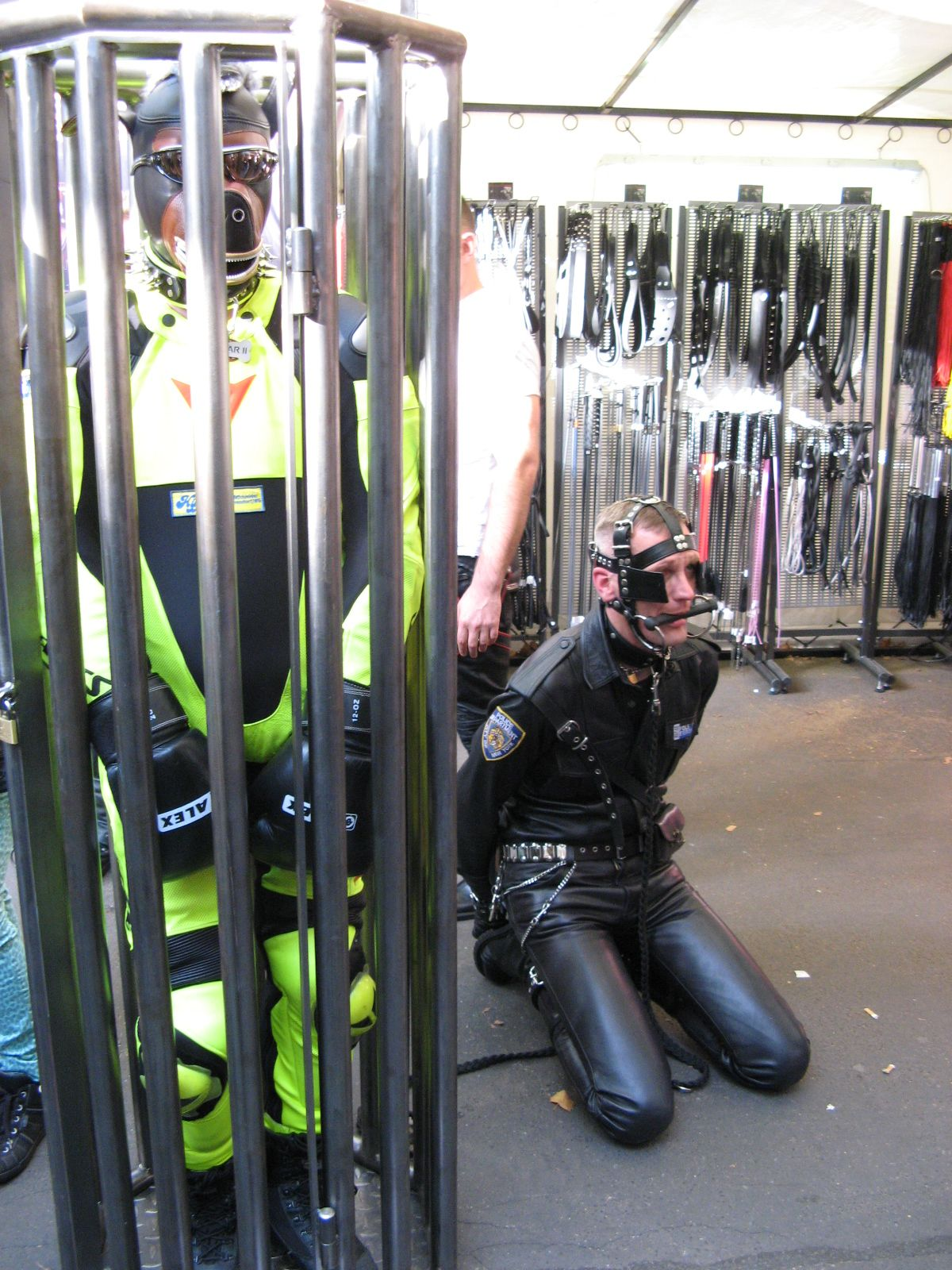
2013

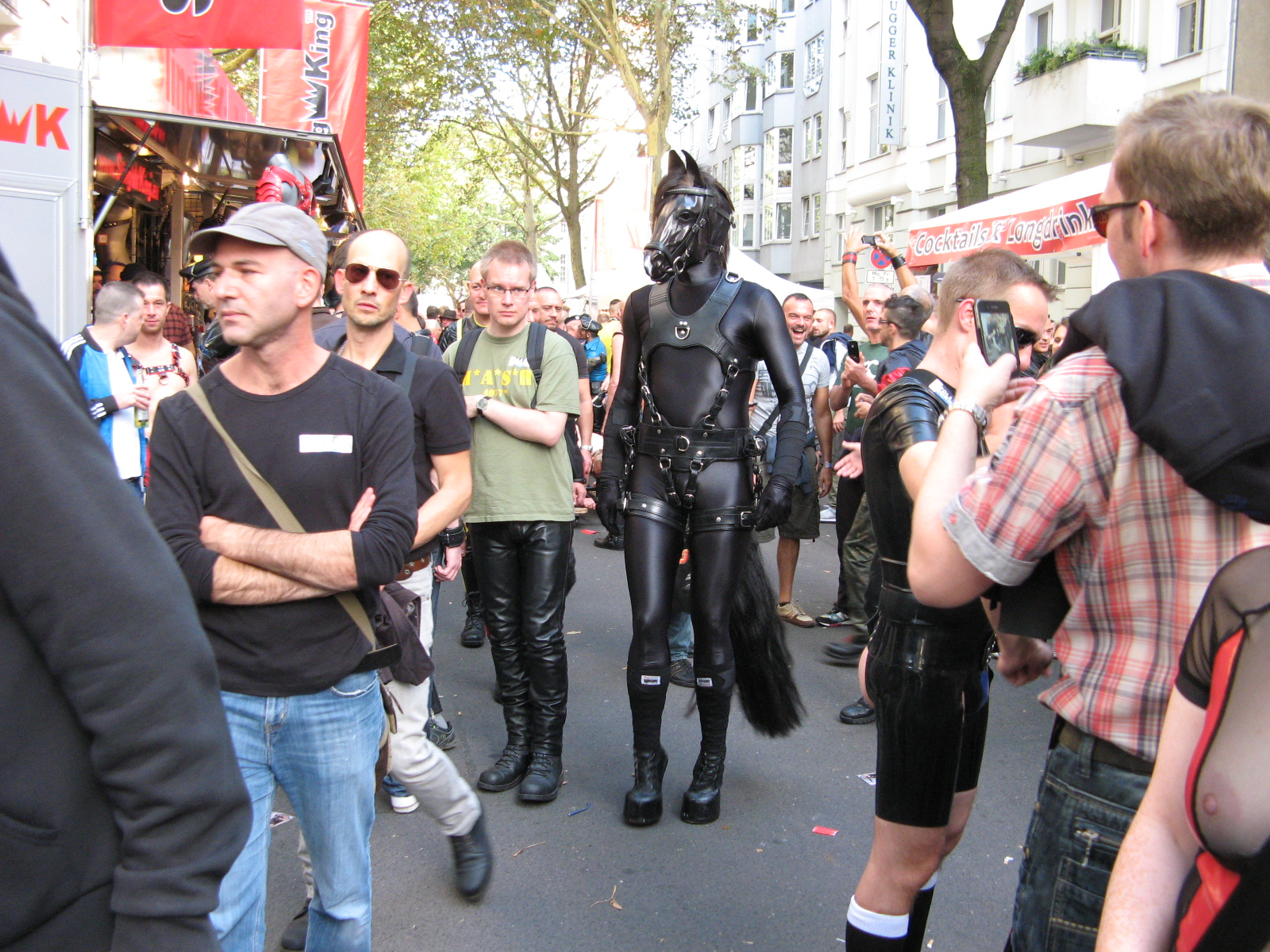
2013

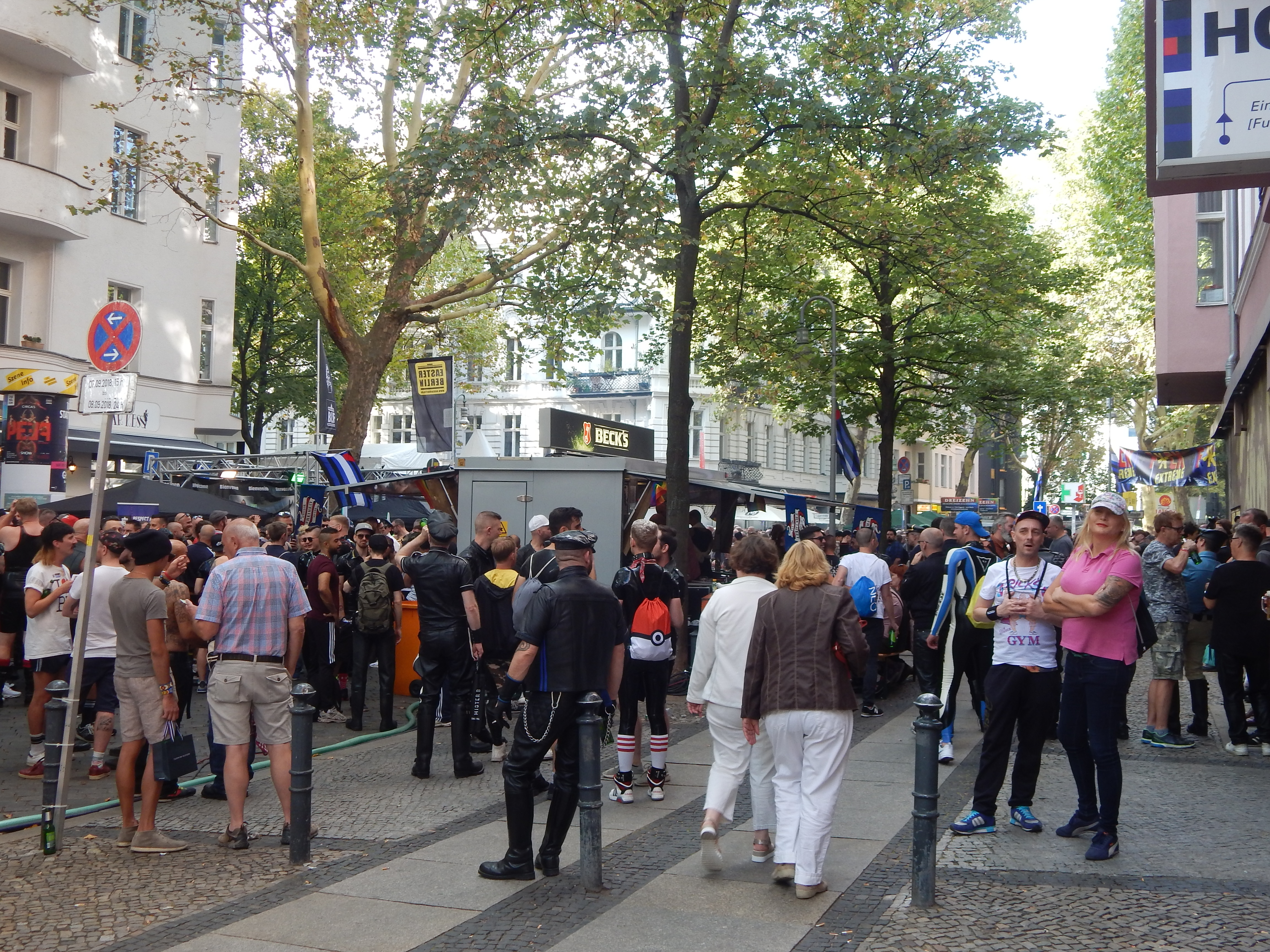
2018

== See also ==
- Berlin Pride
- Kreuzberg Pride (Berlin)
- Lesbian and Gay City Festival (Berlin)
