= Folsom, South Dakota =

Unincorporated community in South Dakota, U.S.

Coordinates: 43°49′31″N 102°52′12″W

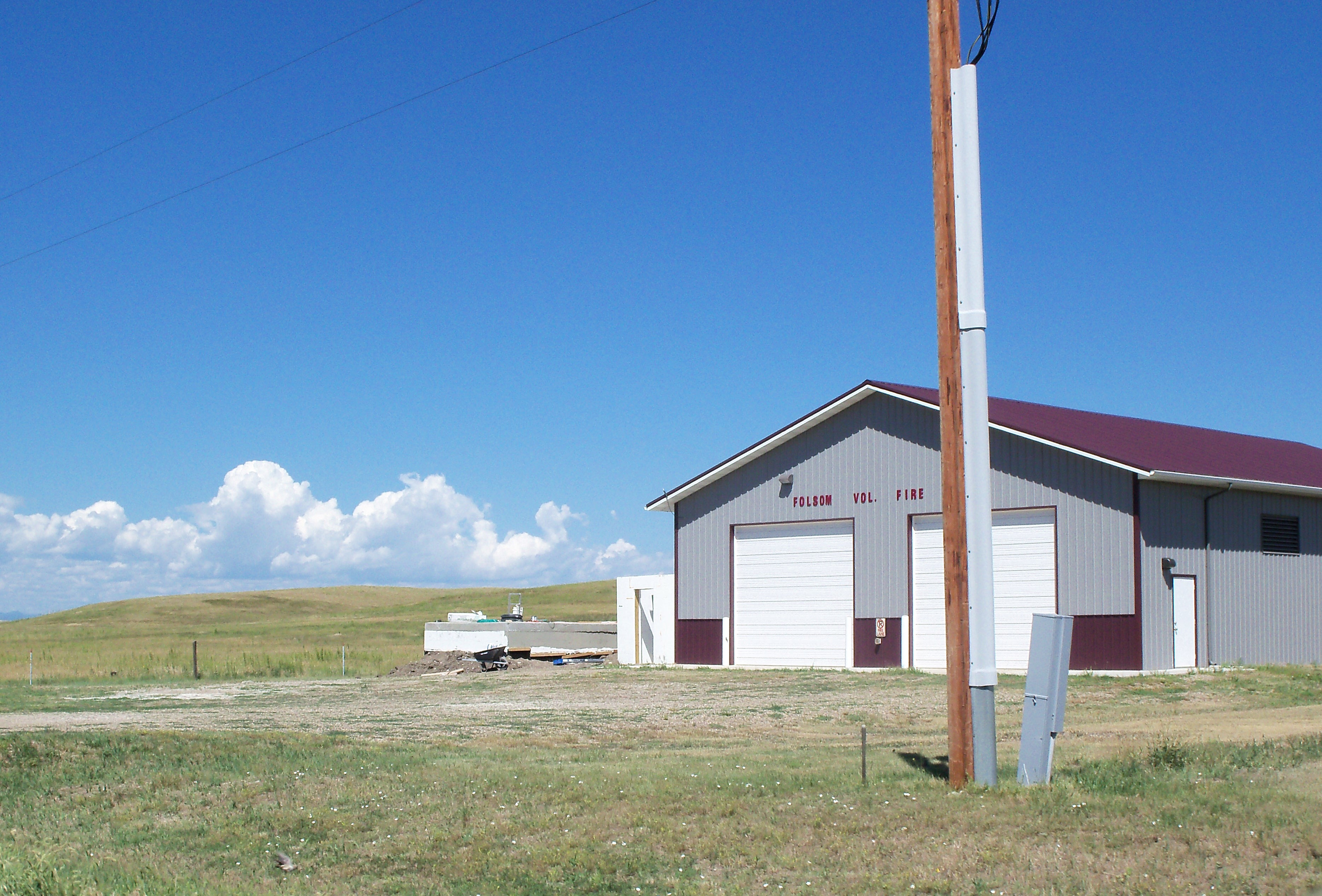
Folsom Volunteer Fire Department

Folsom is an unincorporated community in Custer County, in the U.S. state of South Dakota.

== History ==
A post office called Folsom was established in 1886, and remained in operation until 1948. The community was named after Frances Folsom Cleveland, First Lady of the United States.
