= Abby Folsom =

American feminist and abolitionist (1795–1867)

- Born: Abigail Harford; May 18, 1795; Rochester, New Hampshire, US
- Died: August 5, 1867 (aged 72); Boston, Massachusetts, US
- Occupation: activist

Abigail Folsom (18 May 1795 – 5 August 1867) was a 19th-century American feminist and abolitionist renowned for her outbursts at public events and meetings in Boston.

== Biography ==
Born Abigail Harford, she married Peter Folsom, who ran a saddlers shop out of their home in Rochester, New Hampshire, on May 29, 1825. Within a few years, she would leave him – possibly due to his excessive drinking – and move to Boston.

One historian of Rochester called her "notorious" for her outbursts in church. Ralph Waldo Emerson termed her "the flea of conventions" for her habit of insisting on a woman's right to speak, which would derail abolitionist and other conferences. "She was always in the way at these gatherings, never content to have her own word and subside, but persistent in interrupting other speakers, to the irritation and annoyance of the most forbearing and mild-natured of people," according to a Boston Commonwealth obituary notice. "Unquestionably she was insane, and consequently longer borne with than otherwise would have been the case." Wendell Phillips wrote that in spite of this she "had virtues enough to atone a thousand times for all her faults and defects."

One source relates the following anecdote:

She was often removed from the halls she afflicted by gentle force. As she was a nonresistant, she never struck back, save with her tongue which was keen enough. One day Wendell Phillips and two others placed her in a chair and were carrying her down the aisle through the crowd when she exclaimed: "I'm better off than my master was. He had but one ass to ride — I have three to carry me."

Accounts of her speeches – and the "sensations" they engendered – often appeared in antebellum newspapers, and she frequently shared a stage with prominent black activists like Frederick Douglass. She became famous as a reformer and as one of the earliest women lecturers in the United States. She was also known to go into courts, prisons, and jails to advocate for those on trial and then, upon their release, take them into her own home and help them find jobs. Folsom often attended meetings of the state legislature, and there as at other public gatherings in halls or churches, it was "impossible to keep her silent if anything was said that displeased her." Her disruptive tactics led to accusations of insanity, and she spent time in the Worcester Insane Asylum in 1842.
