= Folsom, Missouri =

Unincorporated community in Missouri, U.S.

Coordinates: 38°44′00″N 92°09′16″W

Folsom is an unincorporated community in Callaway County, in the U.S. state of Missouri.

== History ==
A post office called Folsom was established in 1887, and remained in operation until 1905. The community was named after First Lady Frances Folsom Cleveland.
