= Frank M. Folsom =

Business executive (1894-1970)

Frank Marion Folsom (14 May 1894, Sprague, Washington – 12 January 1970, New York City) was an electronics company executive and was a permanent representative of the Holy See.

== Biography ==
He graduated from Manhattan College, Fordham University, and held an LLD from the University of San Francisco.

Folsom began his career in 1910 at the Montgomery Ward & Co. in the merchandising field. He held the position of manager of west coast operations and Marketing Vice President. From 1940 to 1941 he worked for a department store, Goldblatt Brothers in Chicago, Illinois, and was the assistant coordinator of purchases for OPM from 1941 to 1942. In 1942 he was appointed as special assistant to the Under Secretary of the Navy. He received the Medal of Merit from President Harry S Truman for his work as chief of Navy procurement in Washington during WWII.

While working at the Navy Department, he met David Sarnoff, who got him his next job as Executive Vice President of the RCA Victor Division. He was promoted to president in 1949 and served as Chairman of the Executive Committee Board from 1957.

Frank Folsom and David Sarnoff with the RCA's CT-100, world's first color television.

In June 1952, RCA announced the establishment of a Frank M. Folsom Scholarship, in honor of the President of RCA who is a member of Notre Dame's Advisory Council for Science and Engineering. The scholarship benefits students majoring in pure science or engineering at the University of Notre Dame.

He also served as director of the Coca-Cola Bottling Company, the John P. Maguire Company, NBC, the General Cable Corporation, RCA Commons, Crown Cork & Seal, Tishman International, and served as the representative of the Holy See to the International Atomic Energy Agency.

He was a member of the Augusta National Golf Club, the Blind Brook Club of Port Chester, the Bohemian Club, the Everglades Club of Palm Beach, Florida, the Order of the Holy Sepulchre, the Sovereign Military Order of Malta, Pilgrims of the United States and the Catholic fraternity KÖHV Alpenland (Austria).
