= Berlin Pride =

Annual LGBTQ event in Berlin, Germany

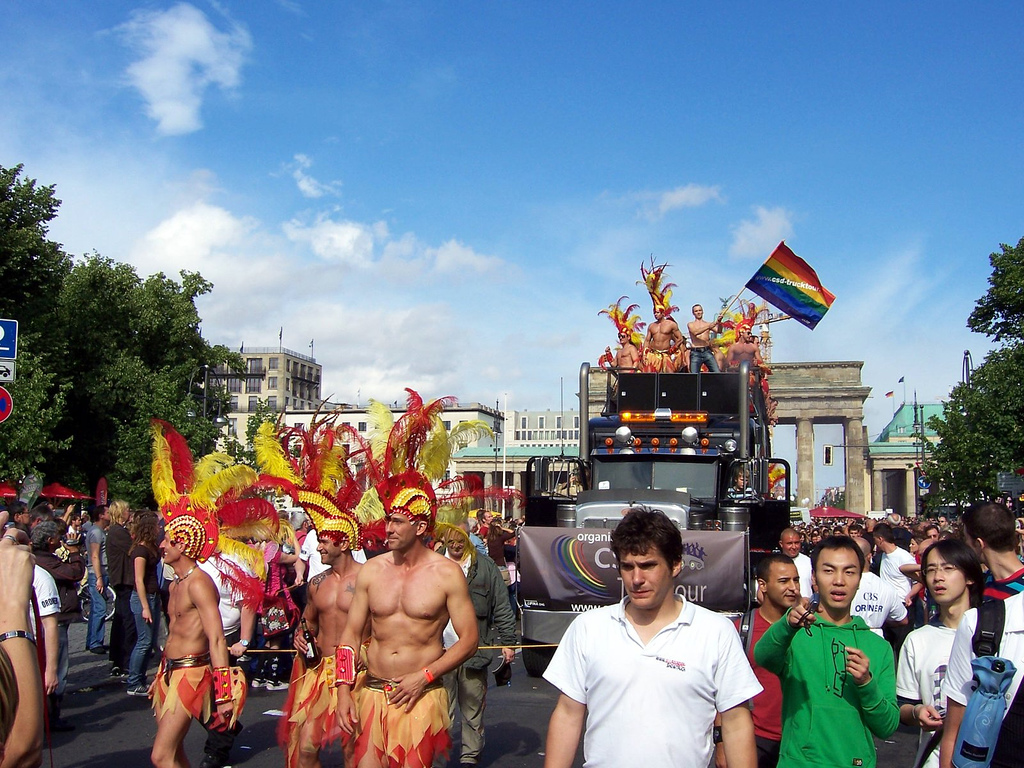
- Pride party truck (2007), Berlin
- Frequency: Annual
- Locations: Berlin, Germany
- Country: Germany
- Years active: 1979
- Inaugurated: 30 June 1979; 47 years ago
- Founder: Bernd Gaiser
- Most recent: 25 July 2026; 3 months ago
- Website: www.csd-berlin.de

The Berlin Pride Celebration, also known as Christopher Street Day Berlin, or CSD Berlin, is a pride parade and festival held in the second half of July each year in Berlin, Germany to celebrate the lesbian, gay, bisexual, transgender and queer (LGBTQ+) people and their allies. Since 1979, the event has been held each year. Berlin Pride is one of the largest gay and lesbian organized events in Germany and one of the biggest in Europe. Its aim is to demonstrate for equal rights and equal treatment for LGBT people, as well as celebrate the pride in Gay and Lesbian Culture.

== History ==
The CSD is held in memory of the Stonewall Riots, the first big uprising of LGBTQ people against police assaults on 27 June 1969. These took place in Christopher Street, in the neighborhood of Greenwich Village in New York City, New York. Bernd Gaiser founded the first Berlin Pride in 1979 after moving to West Berlin in 1967 in his early twenties.

The first CSD in Berlin took place on 30 June 1979, and since then has taken place every year. In 2012, around 700,000 people attended the CSD Parade, and 500,000 people were present at the final parade location at the Brandenburg Gate, making it into one of the largest events in Berlin as well as one of the largest Pride Events in the world.

The 2026 CSD was ended early after a van was rammed into a nearby crowd. One woman was killed and 31 people were injured, several critically. The perpetrator, a 21-year-old German of Lebanese parentage, fled the scene and was fatally shot by police the next day.

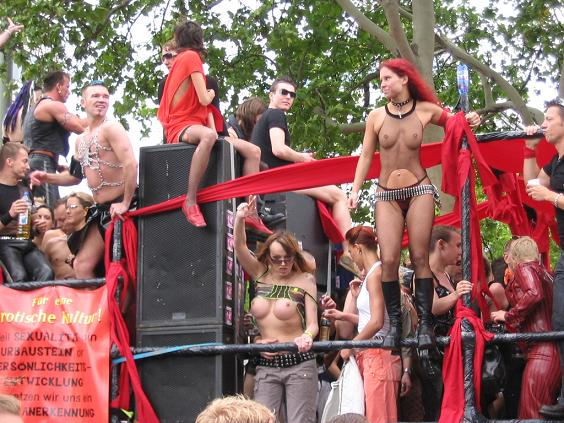
CSD Berlin 2004

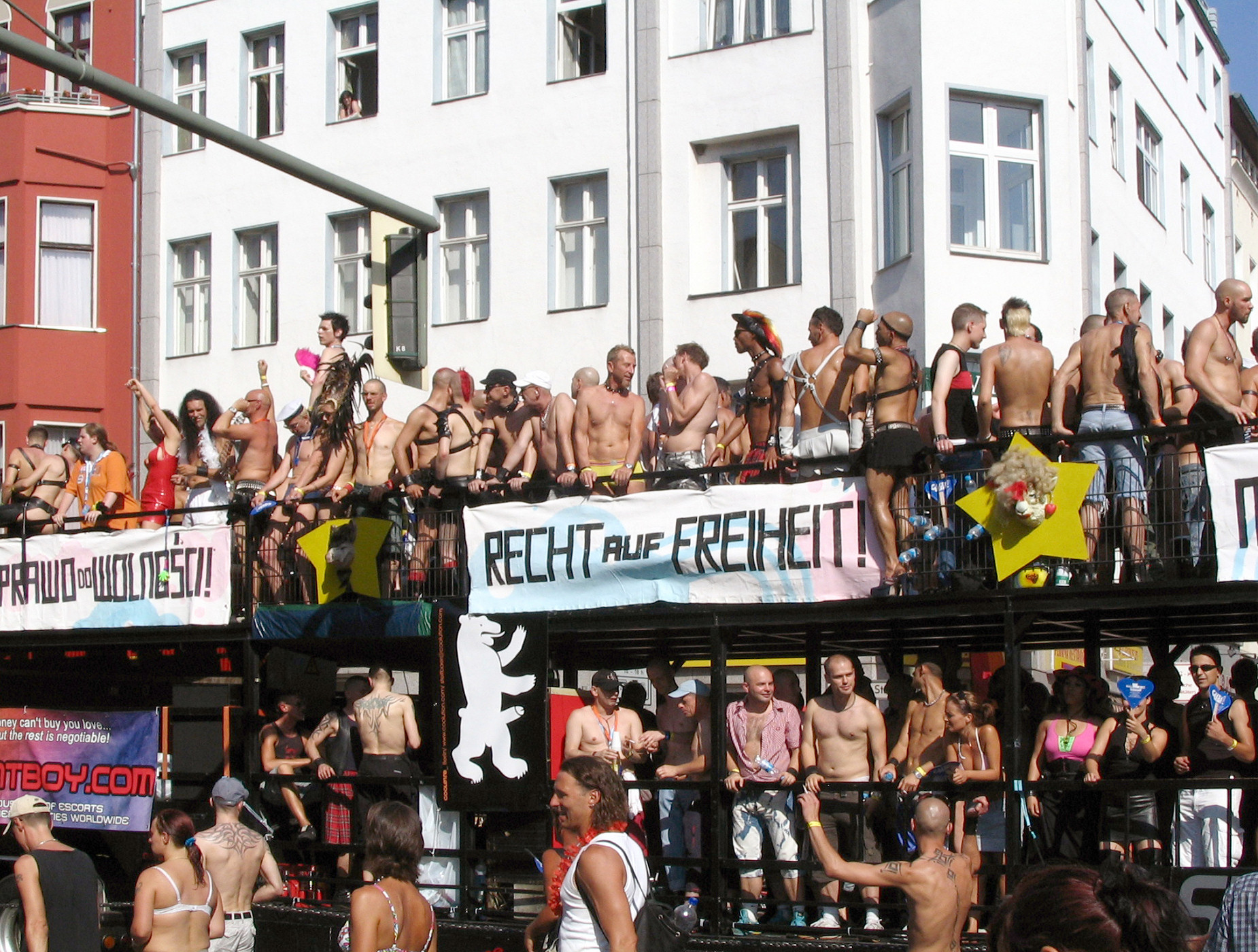
Berlin Pride 2006

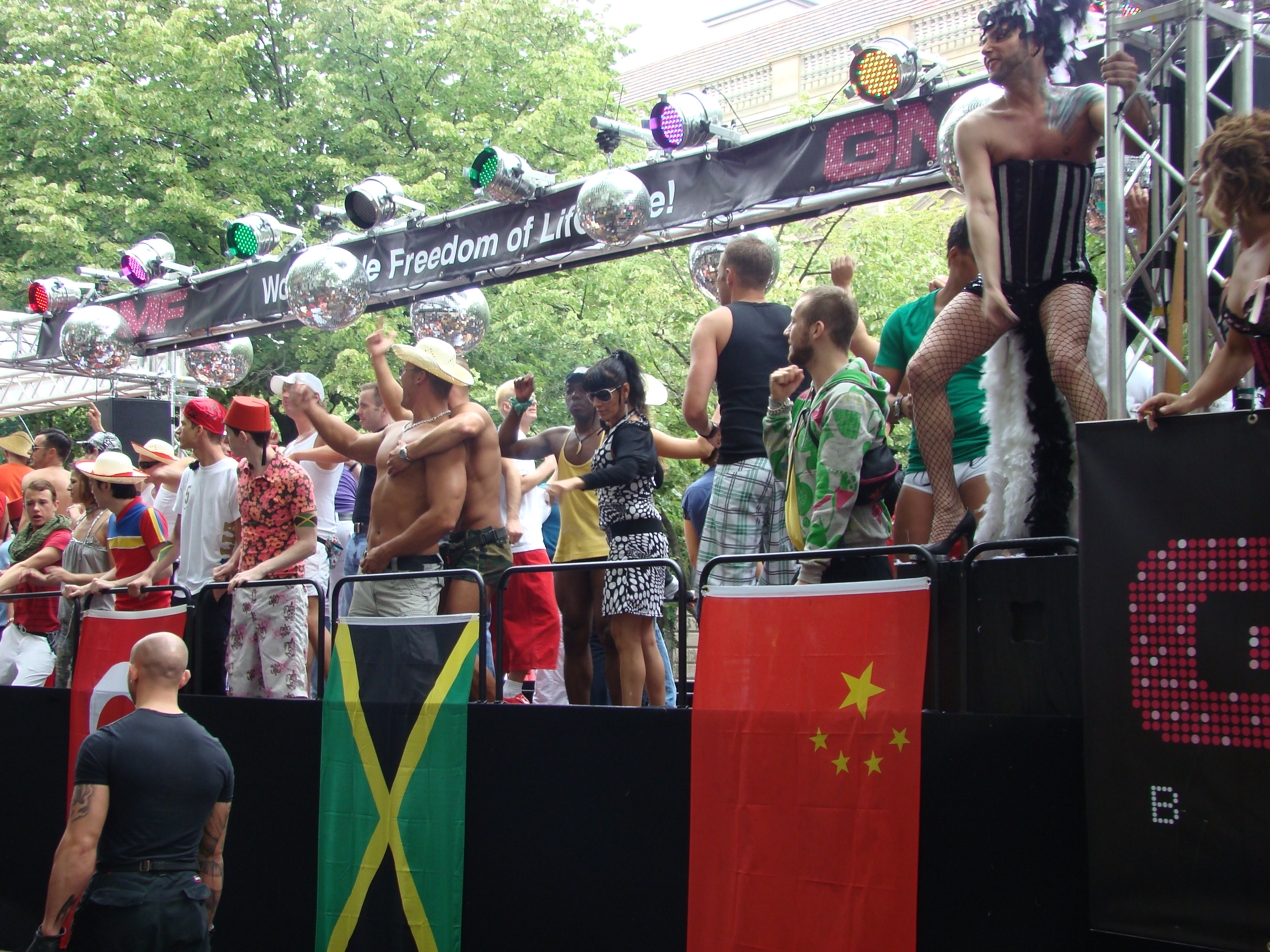
CSD Berlin 2008

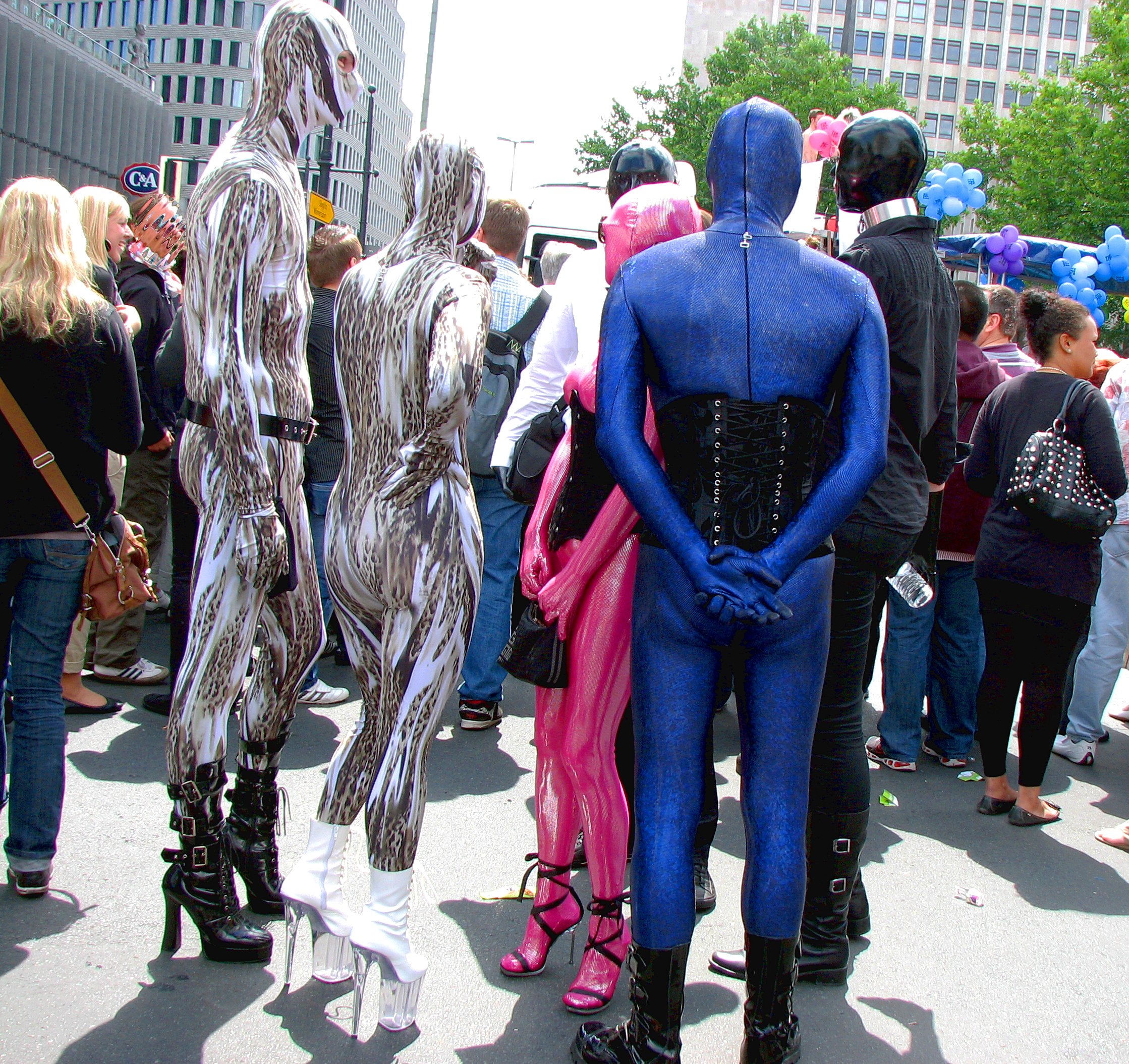
CSD Berlin 2011

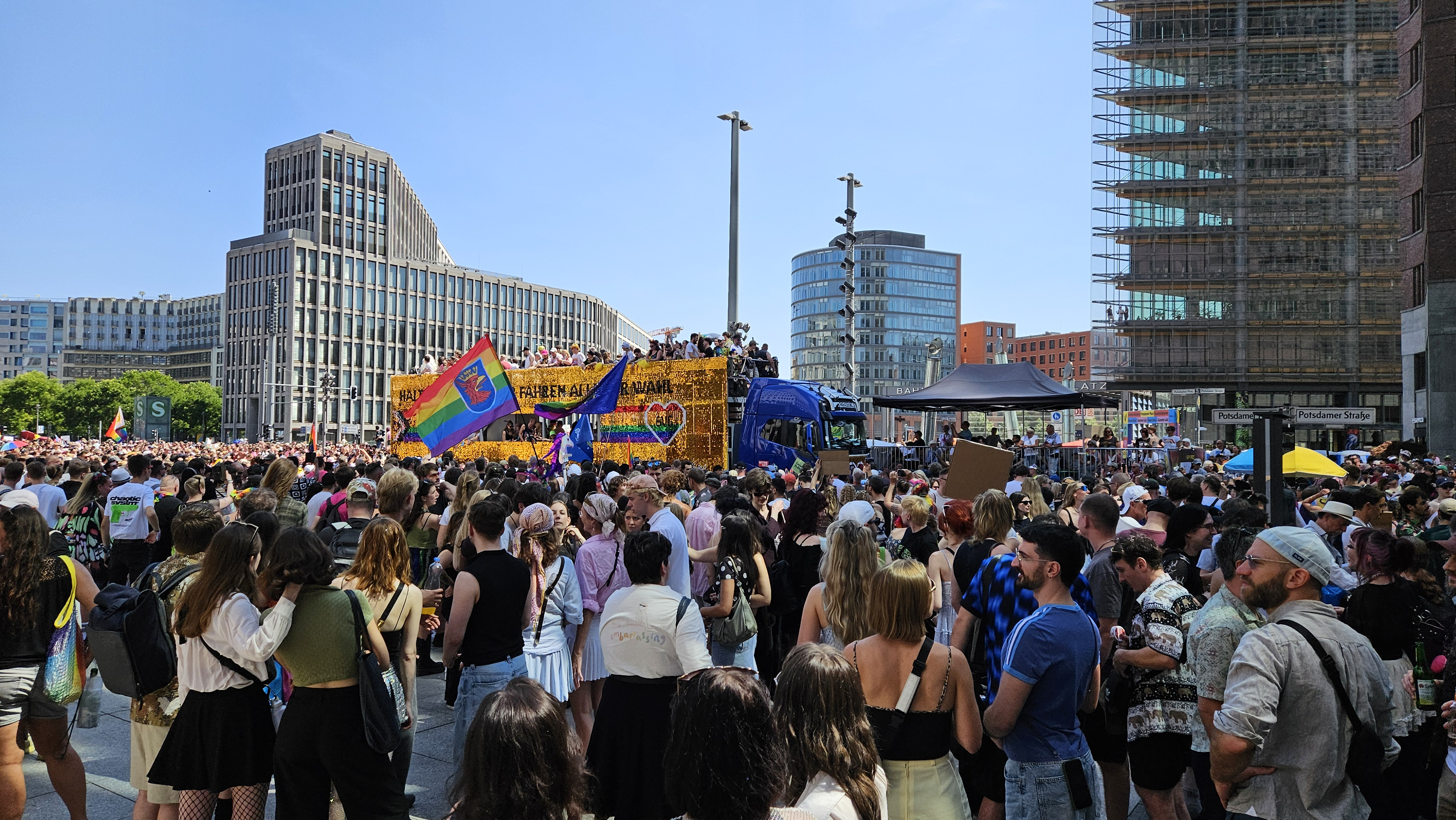
CSD 2026

=== Mottoes and attendance at CSD Berlin ===
In the early years, the Berlin CSD was a relatively small event. From 400 participants in 1979, the number slowly grew to 5,000 people in 1989. It was only from the mid-1990s that the Berlin CSD gave itself an annual motto.

The number of participants and mottos from 1990:

Year	Participants	Floats	Motto (in German)
1990	15,000	?	
1991	10,000	?	
1992	25,000	?	
1993	30,000	?	Vielfalt und Schwesterlichkeit, Solidarität über alle Grenzen
1994	35,000	?	We are family!
1995	40,000	?	
1996	50,000	60	(No specific motto, it just had "CSD '96" as its motto)
1997	120,000	?	Andersrum muss gerechnet werden
1998	300,000	?	Für eine andere Politik – wir fordern gleiche Rechte
1999	350,000	78	Dreißig Jahre Stonewall
2000	500,000	81	Unsere Vielfalt zieht an
2001	500,000	89	Berlin stellt sich qu(e)er gegen rechts
2002	550,000	89	Wir machen Berlin anders! Weltoffen, tolerant queer!
2003	600,000	59	Akzeptanz statt Toleranz
2004	450,000	71	Homokulturell – Multisexuell – Heterogen!
2005	400,000	58	Unser Europa gestalten wir!
2006	450,000	52	Verschiedenheit und Recht und Freiheit
2007	450,000	66	Vielfalt sucht Arbeit
2008	500,000	48	Hass du was dagegen?
2009	550,000	51	Stück für Stück ins Homo-Glück – Alle Rechte für alle!
2010	600,000	52	Normal ist anders!
2011	700,000	52	Fairplay für Vielfalt!
2012	700,000	46	Wissen schafft Akzeptanz
2013	750,000	50	Schluss mit Sonntagsreden! Demonstrieren! Wählen! Verändern!
2014	500,000	29	LGBTI-Rechte sind Menschenrechte
2015	750,000	55	Wir sind alle anders. Wir sind alle gleich.
2016	500,000	51	Anders. Leben!
2017	400,000	58	Mehr von uns – jede Stimme gegen Rechts
2018	Hundreds of thousands	59	Mein Körper, meine Identität, mein Leben!
2019	1,000,000	83	Stonewall 50 – Every riot starts with your voice
2021	65,000	N/A	Save our Community – save our pride
2022	350,000–600,000	96	United in Love! Gegen Hass, Krieg und Diskriminierung
2023	500,000	75	Be their voice - and ours! ... für mehr Empathie und Solidarität!

Pictures from past events

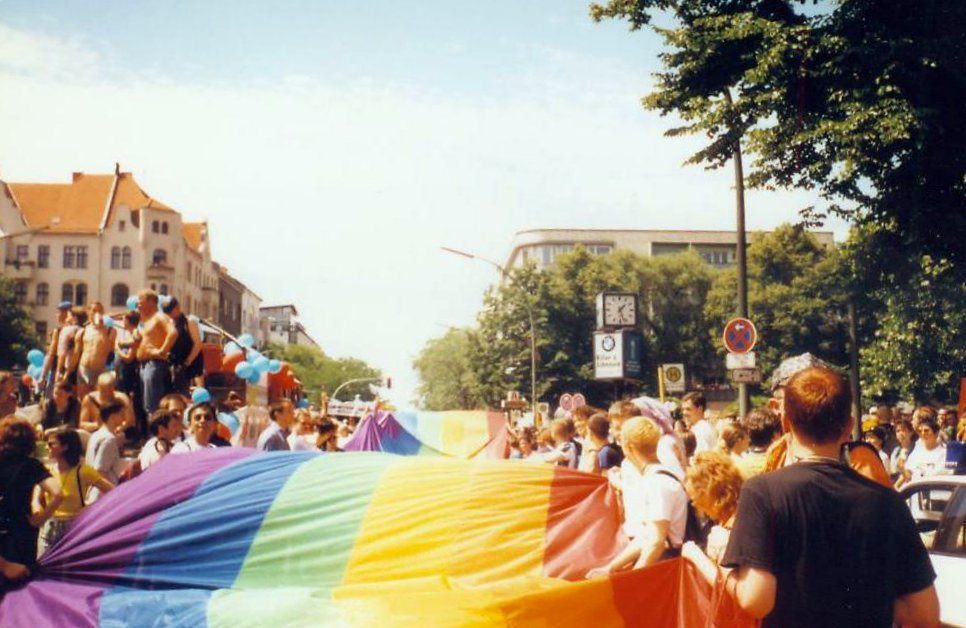
CSD Berlin 1997

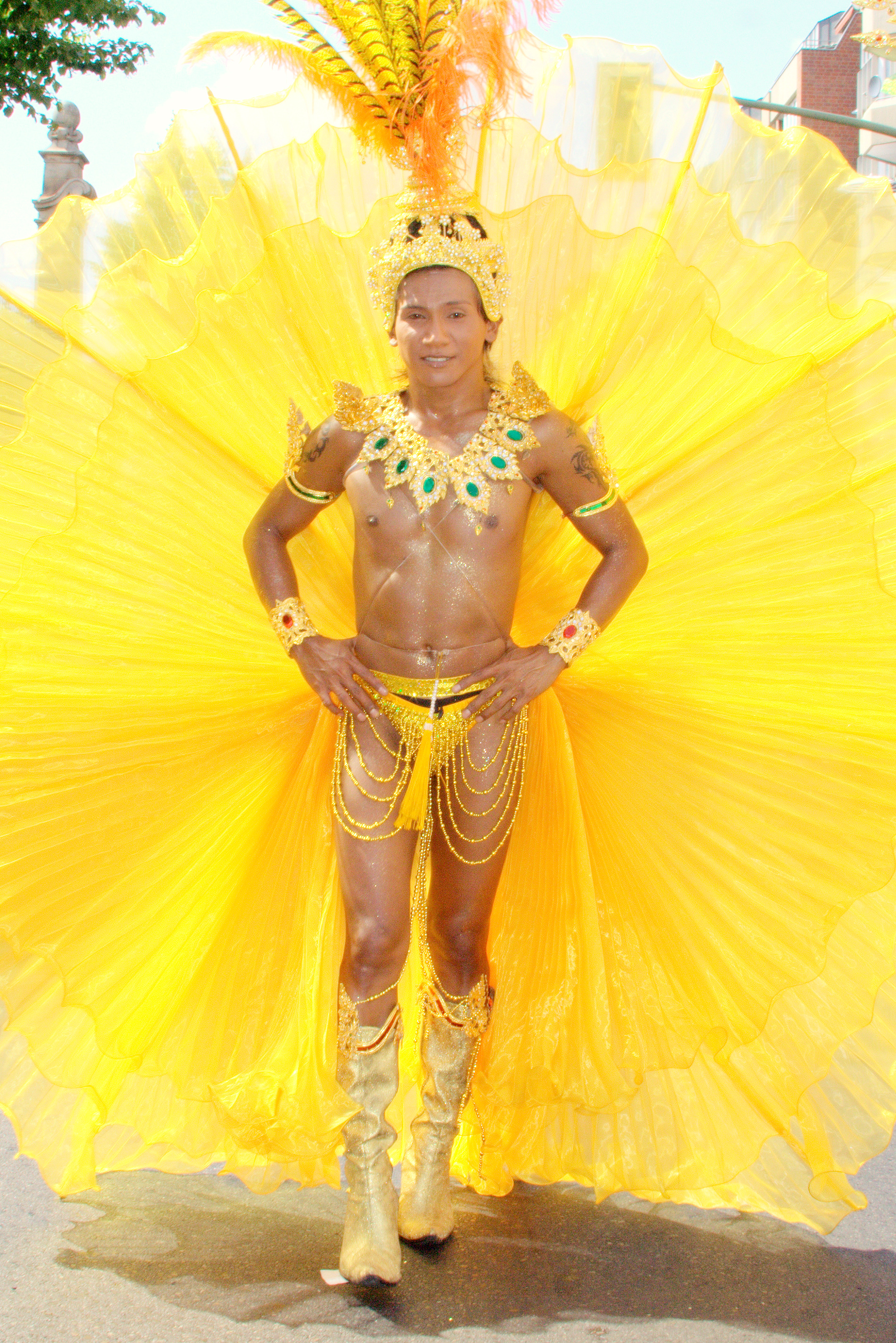
Berlin Pride 2006

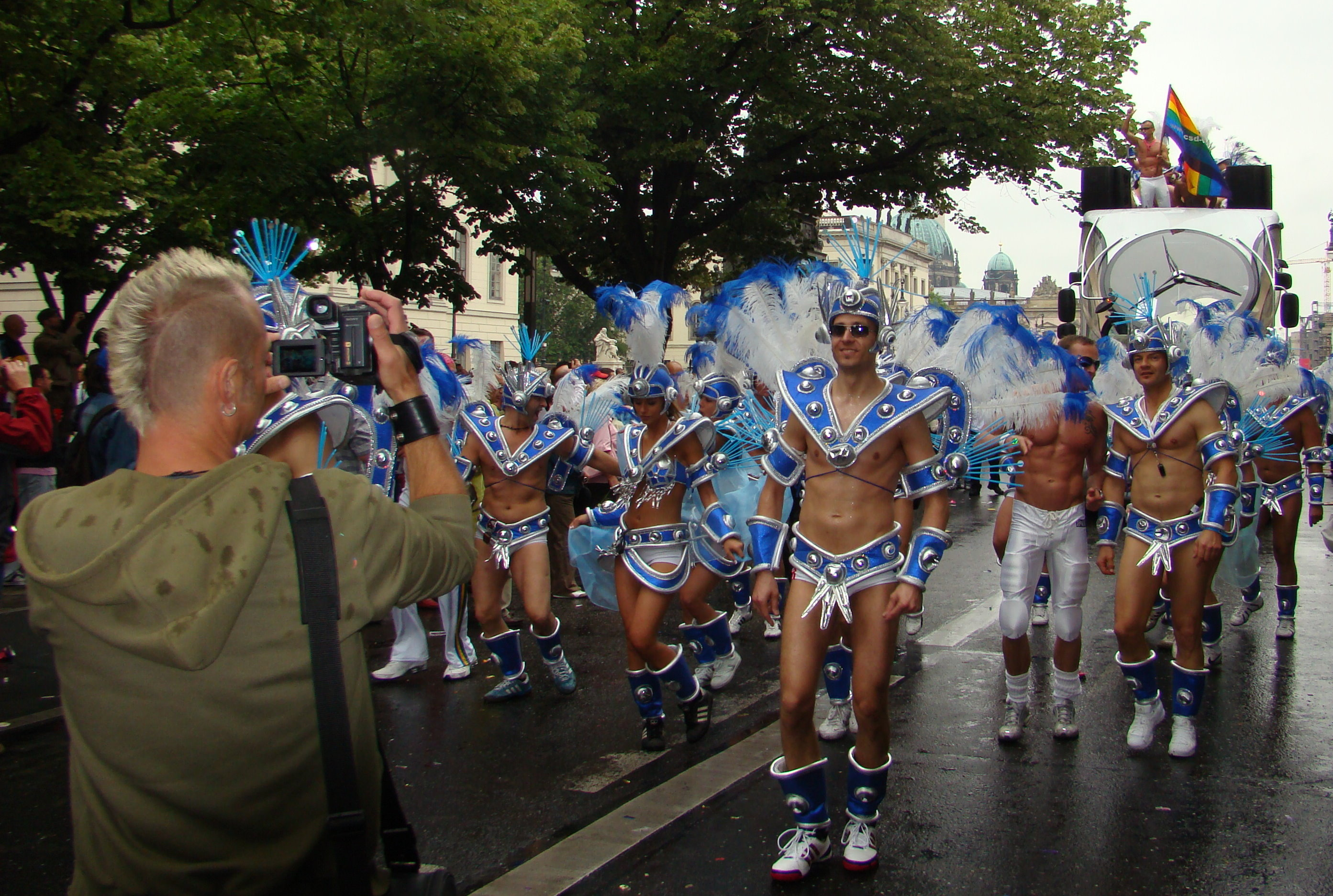
CSD Berlin 2008

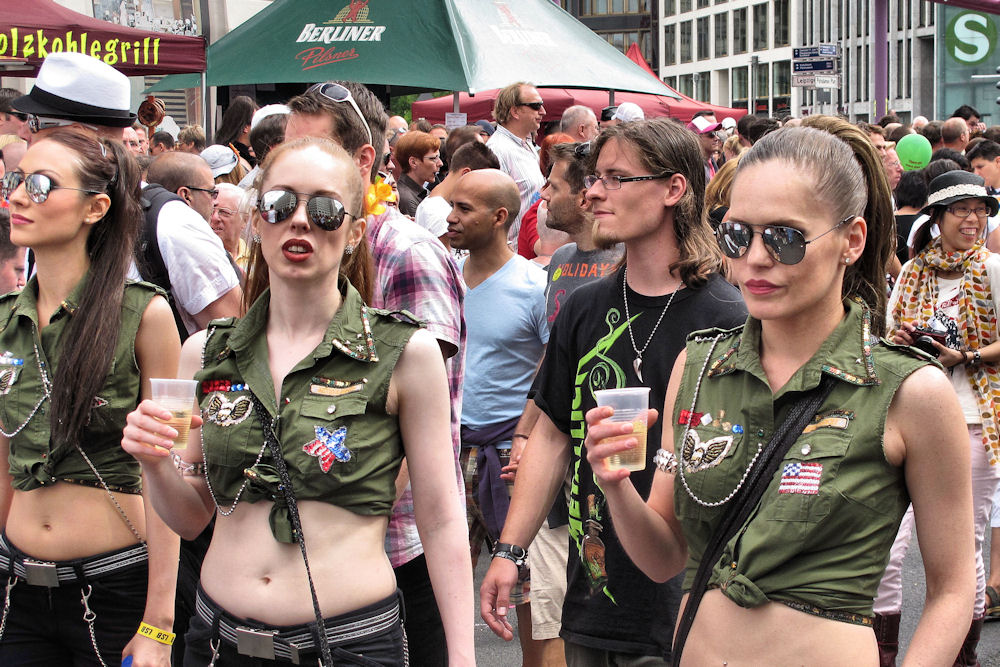
CSD Berlin 2012

== Events ==
CSD Berlin comprises several events, taking place within the framework of the month-long Pride Festival, usually starting at the end of May. Pride Week is the final week of the festival, ending with the CSD Parade. The CSD Gala has been taking place since 2011, and is organised in co-operation with the Friedrichstadt Show Palace.

In the same month both Kreuzberg Pride and Gay Night at the Zoo are held. More gay festivals in Berlin include Easter Berlin.

== Organization ==
All CSD events are organised by the Berliner CSD e.V. (Berlin LGBT Pride Association). The organization was formed at the end of 1999. The association was meant to relieve the three previous coordinators: the "Sonntags-Club", "LSVD" and "Mann-o-Meter", who had been organizing the "CSD Berlin" from 1994 to 1999.

Each year, the theme, motto and political demands of the CSD Parade are determined in so-called Pride Forums. These are open meetings that can be attended by anyone.

In June 2010, American philosopher and theorist Judith Butler refused CSD Berlin's Civil Courage Award (Zivilcouragepreis) at the award ceremony, arguing that the parade had become too commercial, and was ignoring the problems of racism and double discrimination facing homosexual or transsexual migrants. According to Butler, even the organizers themselves promote racism. The general manager of the CSD committee, Robert Kastl, countered Butler's allegations and pointed out that the organizers already awarded a counselling center for lesbians dealing with double discrimination in 2006. Regarding the allegations of commercialism Kastl explained further that the CSD organizers do not require small groups to pay a participation fee which starts at 50 € and goes up to 1500 €. He also distanced himself from all forms of racism and Islamophobia.

== See also ==
- LGBT rights in Germany
- Lesbian and Gay City Festival
