= Kreuzberg Pride =

Annual LGBT event in Berlin, Germany

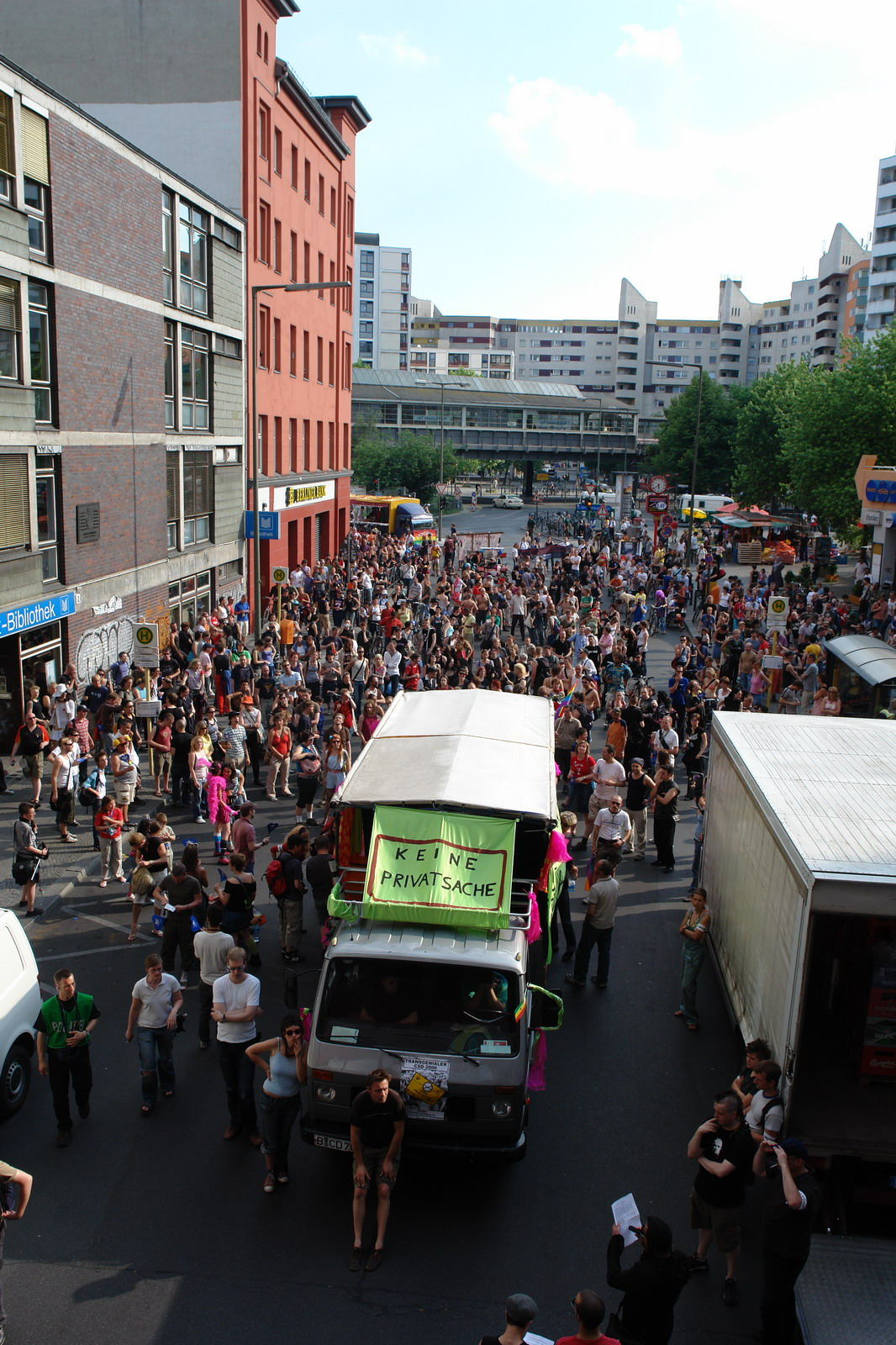
Kreuzberg Pride 2010

The Kreuzberg Pride (German: Transgenialer CSD) was a parade and festival held in June each year in Kreuzberg, Berlin, to celebrate the lesbian, gay, bisexual, and transgender (LGBT) people and their allies. From 1998 to 2013, the event had been held each year. In the same month both Berlin Pride and Gay Night at the Zoo is held.

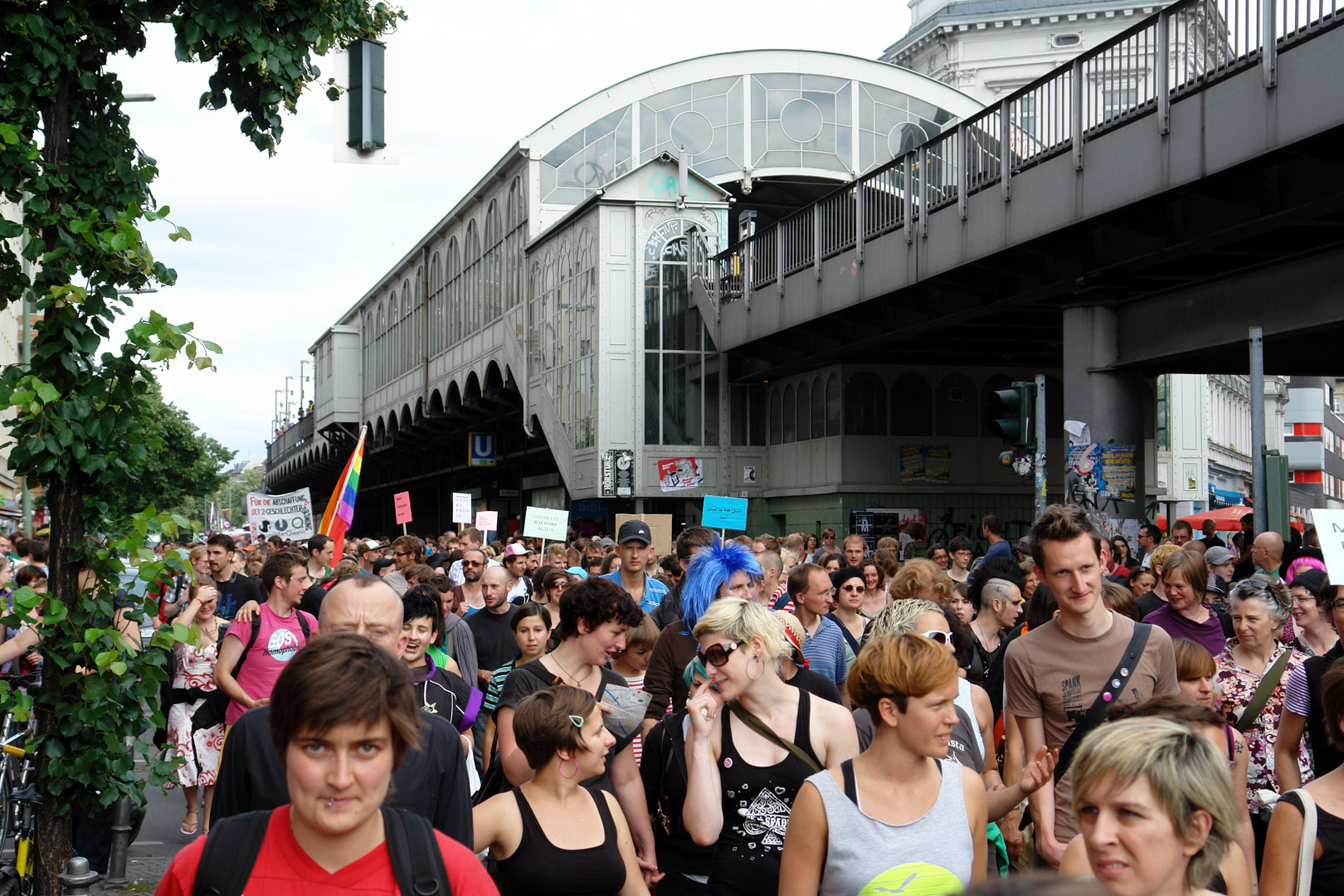
Kreuzberg Pride 2009

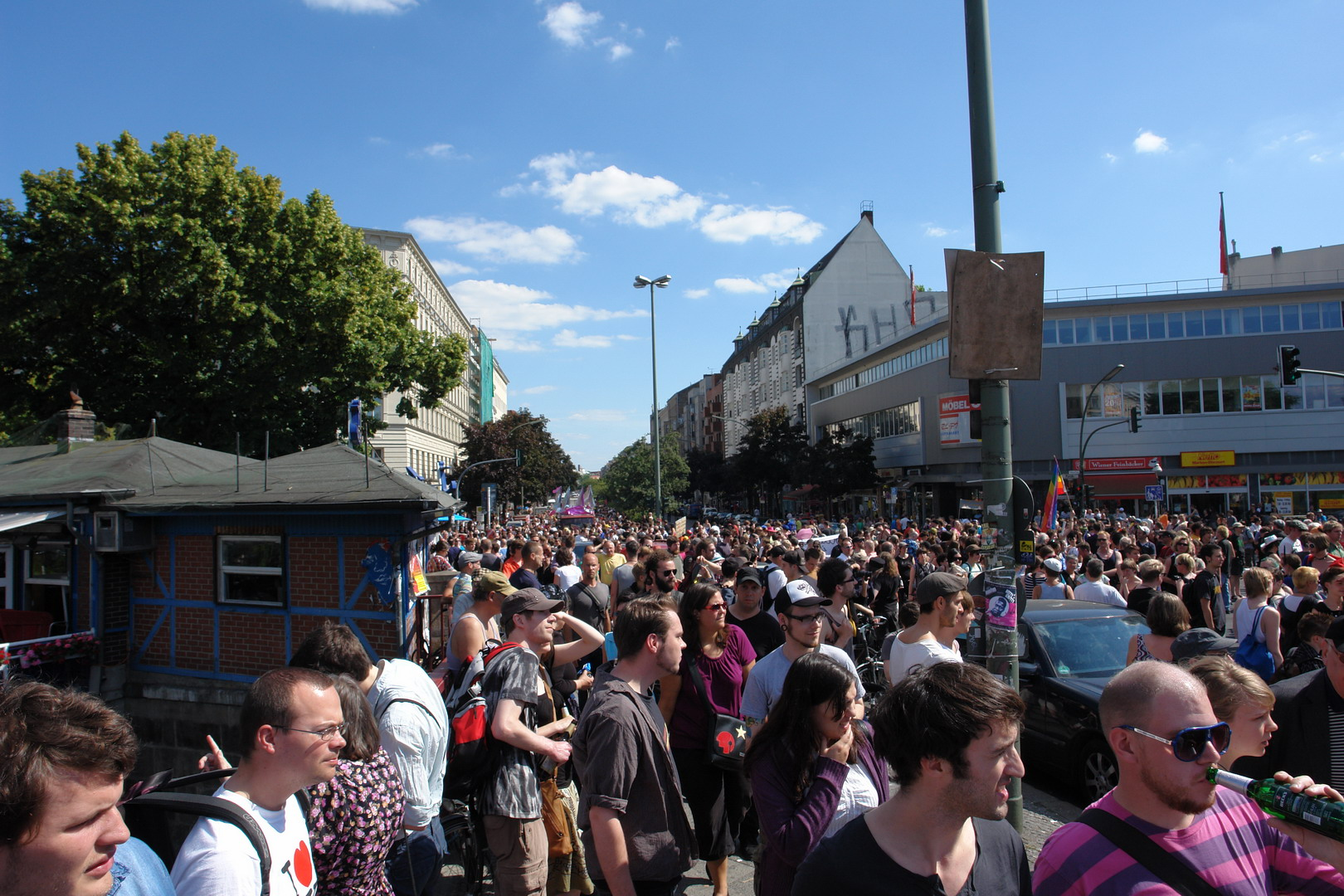
Kreuzberg Pride 2010

== See also ==
- LGBT rights in Germany
