= Motzstraße =

Street in Tempelhof-Schöneberg, Berlin

- Motzstrasse
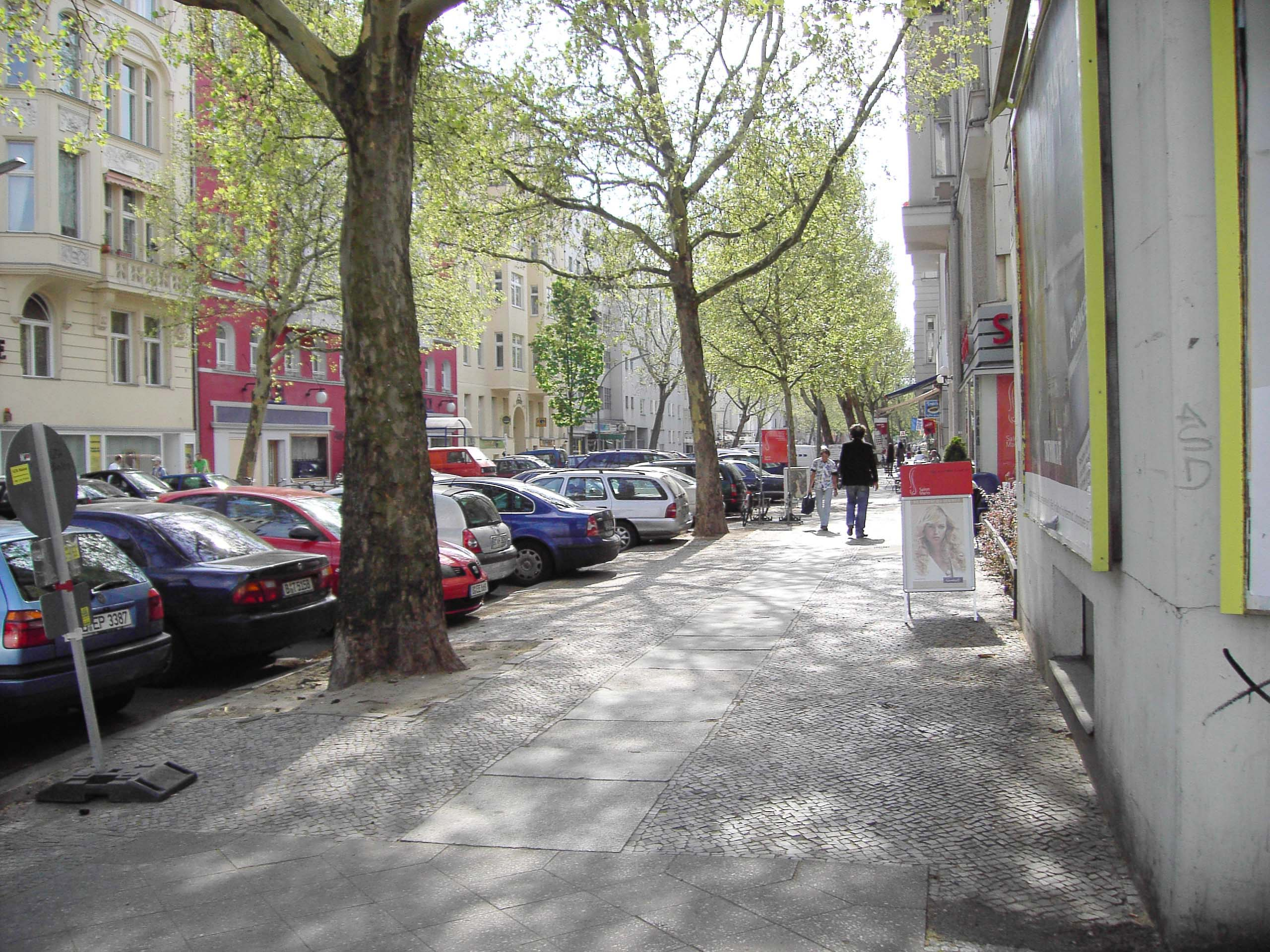
- Motzstrasse, near Nollendorfplatz, in 2007
- Interactive map of Motzstraße
- Former names: Nollendorfplatz–Martin-Luther-Straße: Straße 20 der Abteilung IV; (to 1889); Viktoria-Luise-Platz–Prager Platz: Westphälische Straße; (before 1874–c. 1877); Auguststraße; (c. 1877–c. 1890); Königshofer Straße; (c. 1890–1901)
- Namesake: Friedrich von Motz
- Type: Street
- Length: 1,500 m (4,900 ft)
- Location: Berlin, Germany
- Quarter: Schöneberg, Wilmersdorf
- Nearest metro station: Nollendorfplatz; Viktoria-Luise-Platz; Güntzelstraße
- Coordinates: 52°29′46″N 13°20′36″E
- Northeast end: Else-Lasker-Schüler-Straße; Karl-Heinrich-Ulrichs-Straße; Kleiststraße; Maaßenstraße; Bülowstraße; Nollendorfplatz
- Major junctions: Eisenacher Straße; Kalckreuthstraße; Gossowstraße; Martin-Luther-Straße; Geisbergstraße; Viktoria-Luise-Platz; Welserstraße; Regensburger Straße; Münchener Straße; Winterfeldtstraße; Ansbacher Straße; Hohenstaufenstraße; Bamberger Straße; Nachodstraße
- Southeast end: Prager Platz; Prager Straße; Trautenaustraße; Prinzregentenstraße; Aschaffenburger Straße

Construction
- Inauguration: 1870

Motzstraße, or Motzstrasse (see ß), is a street in the Berlin borough of Tempelhof-Schöneberg. It runs from Nollendorfplatz via Viktoria-Luise-Platz in Schöneberg to Prager Platz in Wilmersdorf.

The section of Motzstraße between Nollendorfplatz and Martin-Luther-Straße is the centre of one of Berlin's gay areas. Berlin's Lesbian and Gay City Festival Motzstraßenfest is held there every July, on the weekend before the Gay Pride celebrations (CSD) in Berlin.

== History ==
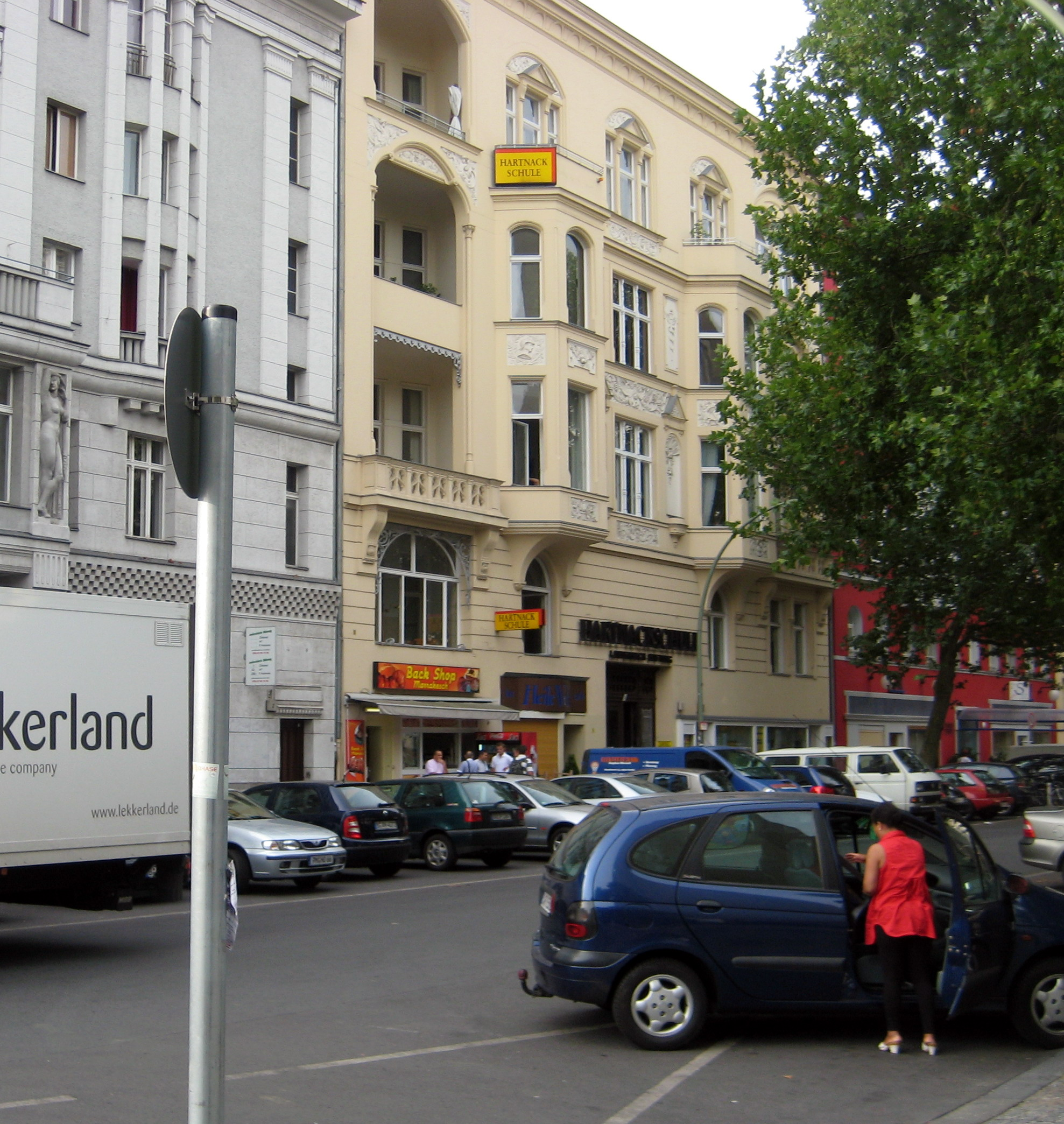
Motzstrasse, just south of Nollendorfplatz, in 2009

Named after Friedrich von Motz, a Prussian Finance Minister, the first, northerly section was laid out around 1870. That section, to the north of Nollendorfplatz has been renamed twice, in 1934 to Mackensenstraße, at which time the street numbering was changed and again in 1996 to Else Lasker-Schüler Straße. Motzstraße 6 was the location of the American Church from 1903 until 1944, when it was destroyed in an Allied air raid, along with many other buildings in the area. "motzbuch" was located at Motzstraße 32 from 1981 and attracted many authors for readings, including Reinhard Jirgl. The business closed during the COVID-19 pandemic.

Due to the COVID-19 pandemic, the annual street festival was cancelled in 2020 and 2021.

== Surroundings ==
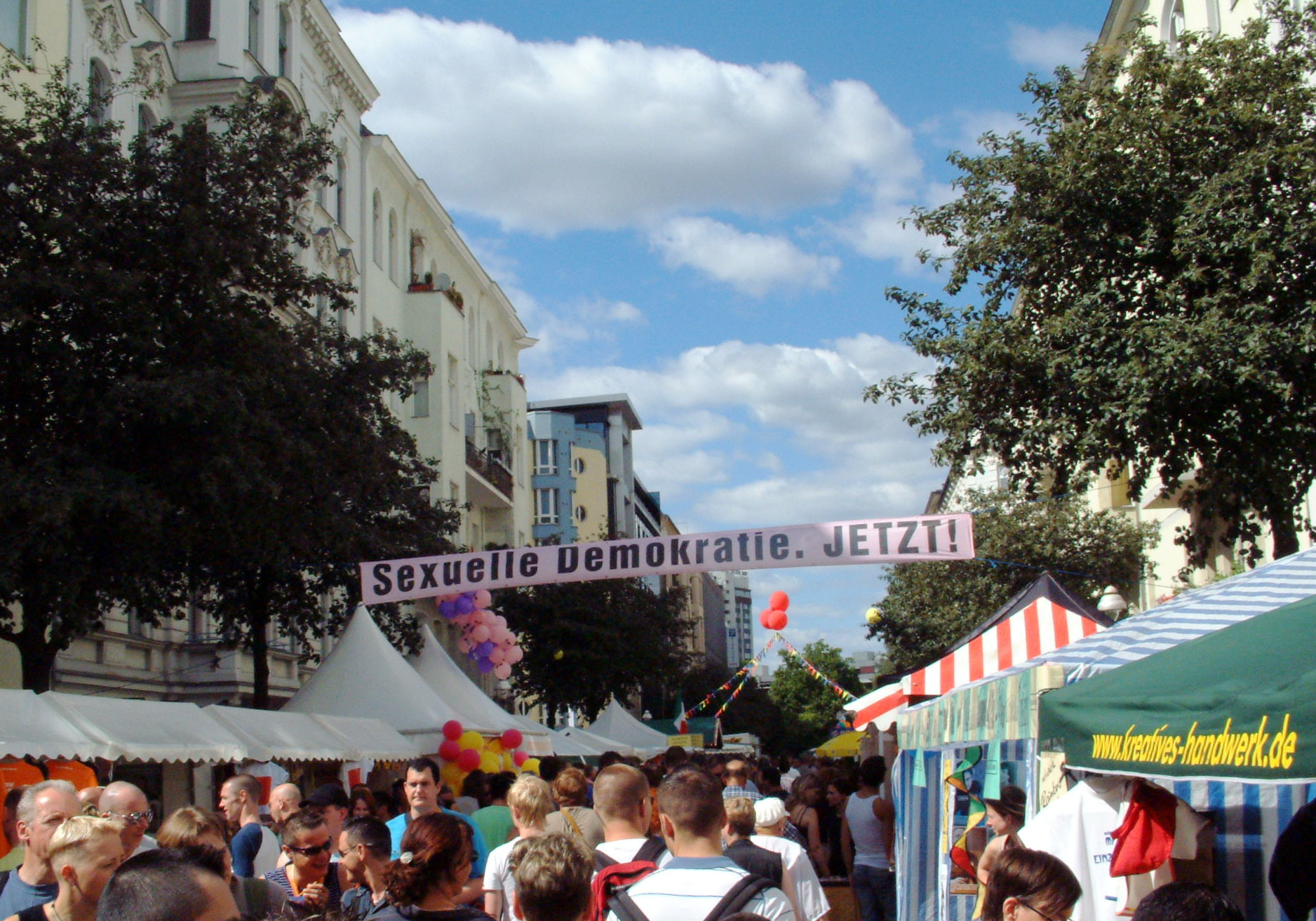
Lesbian and Gay City Festival (2006) on Motzstrasse

The area around Motzstraße has been recognised as a gay-friendly neighbourhood since the 1900s. Related establishments include Piscator's Theatre (later Metropol Theatre) and then Metropol cinema), Metropol discothek, Goya club (now known as Metropol), and the Eldorado (1926–1932).

British-American author Christopher Isherwood lived around the corner from Motzstraße on Nollendorfstraße, where he was inspired by the area's diversity to write several of his best-selling novels.

The section of Motzstraße around Viktoria-Luise-Platz, restored after wartime damage, is an upscale neighbourhood filled with Wilhelmine architecture. Many notable personalities and famous figures have made their homes in the area, such as Rudolf Steiner and Else Lasker-Schüler.
