= Seeler =

Seeler is a surname. Notable people with the surname include:

- Edgar Viguers Seeler (1867–1929), American architect
- Margarete Seeler (1909–1996), German-born American artist, designer, educator, and author; known for her cloisonné work.
- Moriz Seeler (1896–1942), German writer, poet, film producer, and victim of the Holocaust
- Nick Seeler (born 1993), American ice hockey player
- Uwe Seeler (1936-2022), German footballer and football official
