= Lesbian and Gay City Festival =

Street festival in Berlin, Germany

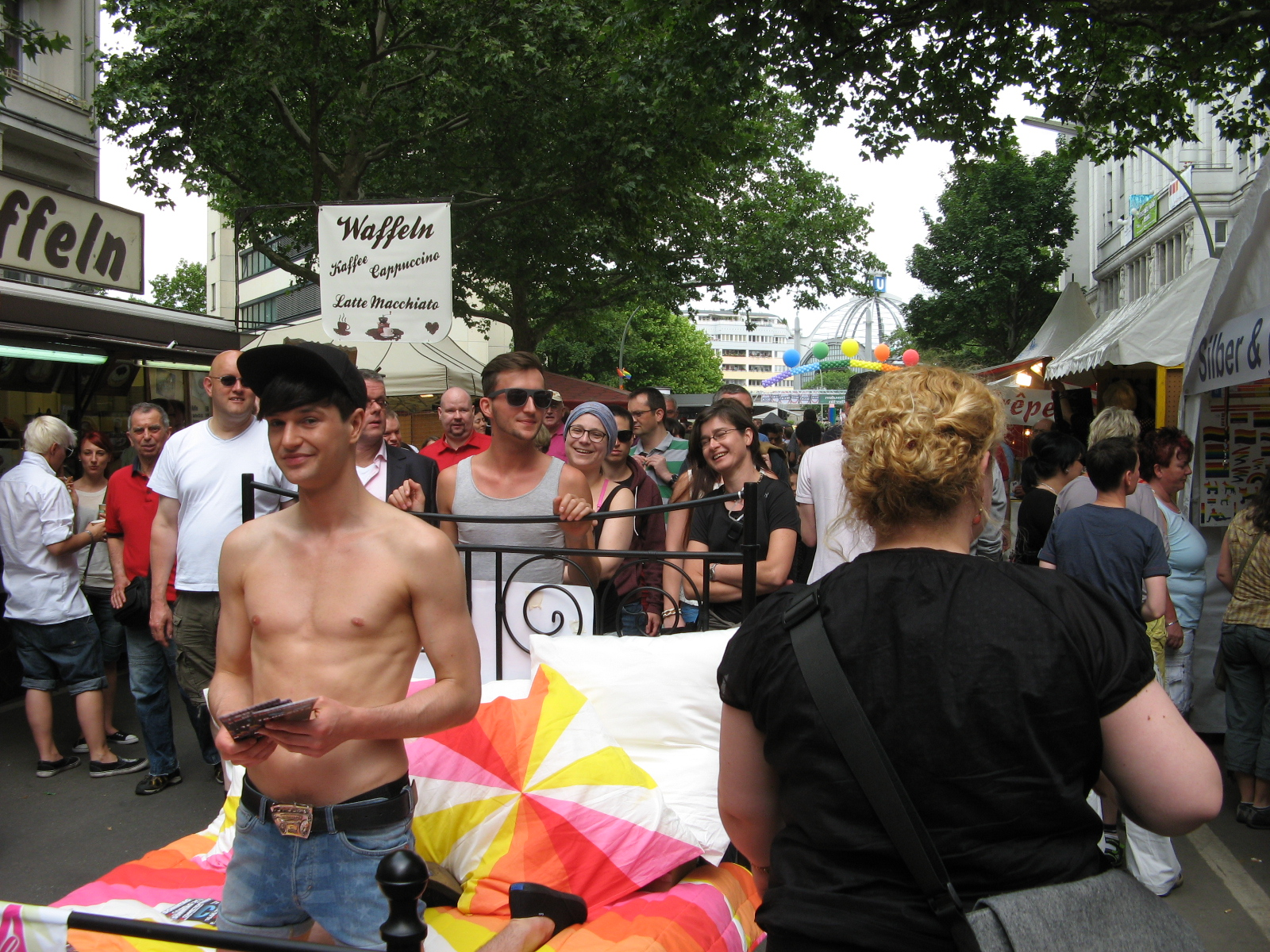
Lesbian and Gay City Festival in Berlin 2013

The Lesbian and Gay City Festival (Lesbisch-Schwules Stadtfest) in Berlin is Europe's largest street festival for lesbians and gays. It has been held in the traditional gay area around Nollendorfplatz in Schöneberg since 1993.

In Berlin it is often referred to as the Motzstraßenfest (Motz-street festival) as the Motzstraße is locally well known for its concentration of gay bars. The first festival only took place in this street, being organized by bar tenants of the street. The founders had created a work group, "Konzertierte Aktion lesbisch-schwuler Wirtschaft in Berlin" (Concerted Action of Lesbian-Gay Economy in Berlin) that grew into the current organizer association "Regenbogenfonds e. V." (Rainbow Funds Association). Over the years the festival has grown both by area and theme coverage.

The festival takes place each year in June in the streets Motzstraße, Eisenacher Straße, Fuggerstraße and Kalckreuthstraße. The festival has spread over seven festival areas: World of Radio, World of Travel, Positive World, World of Film, World of Politics, World of Sports and World of Wellness and Health.

== Pictures ==
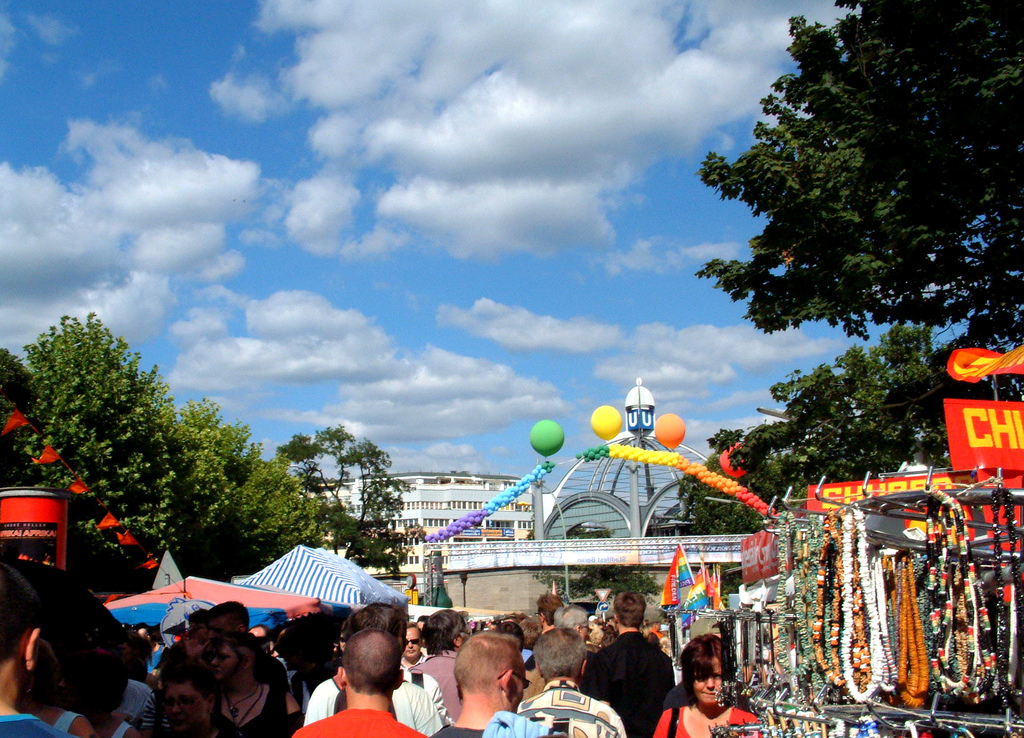

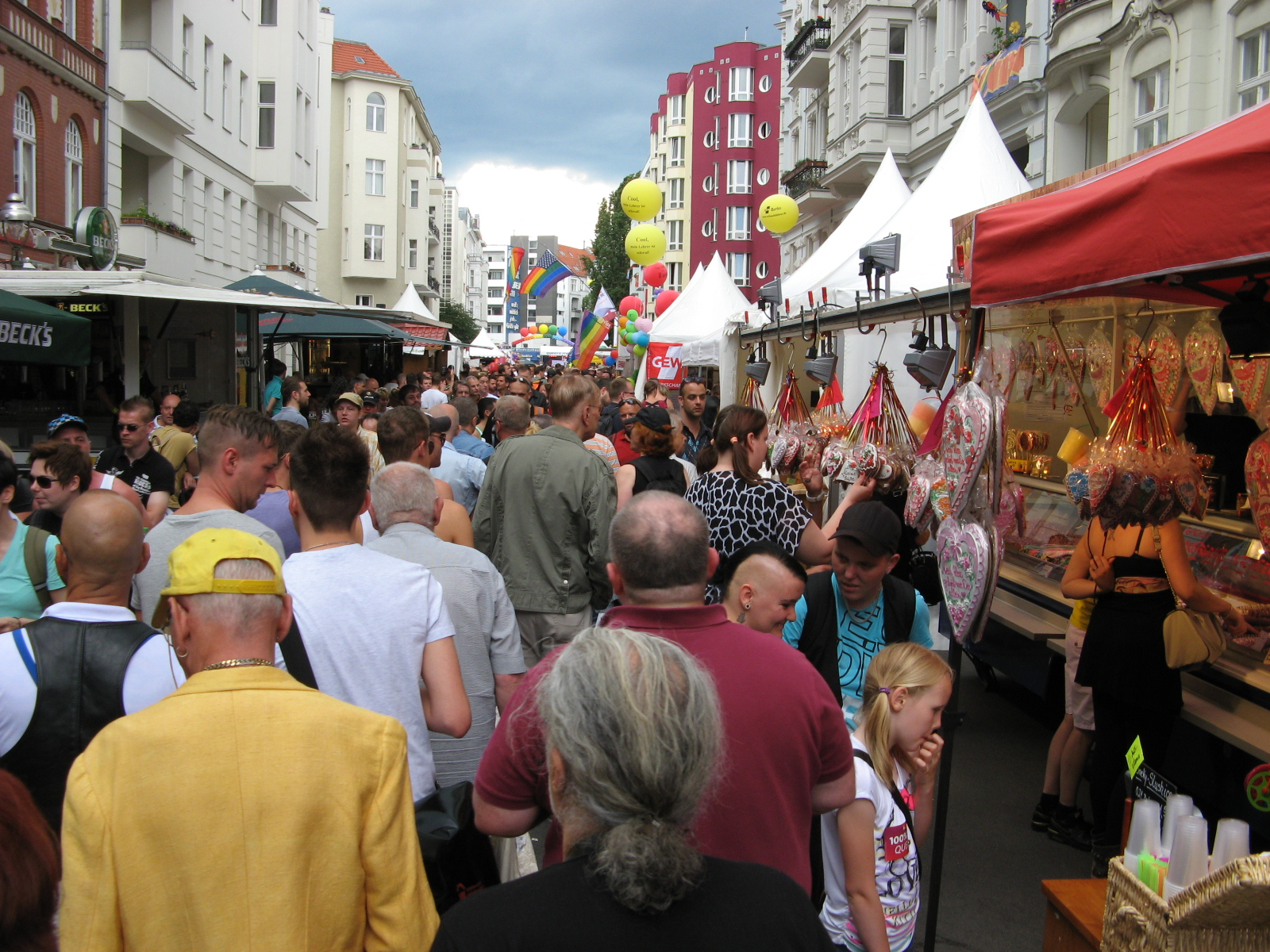

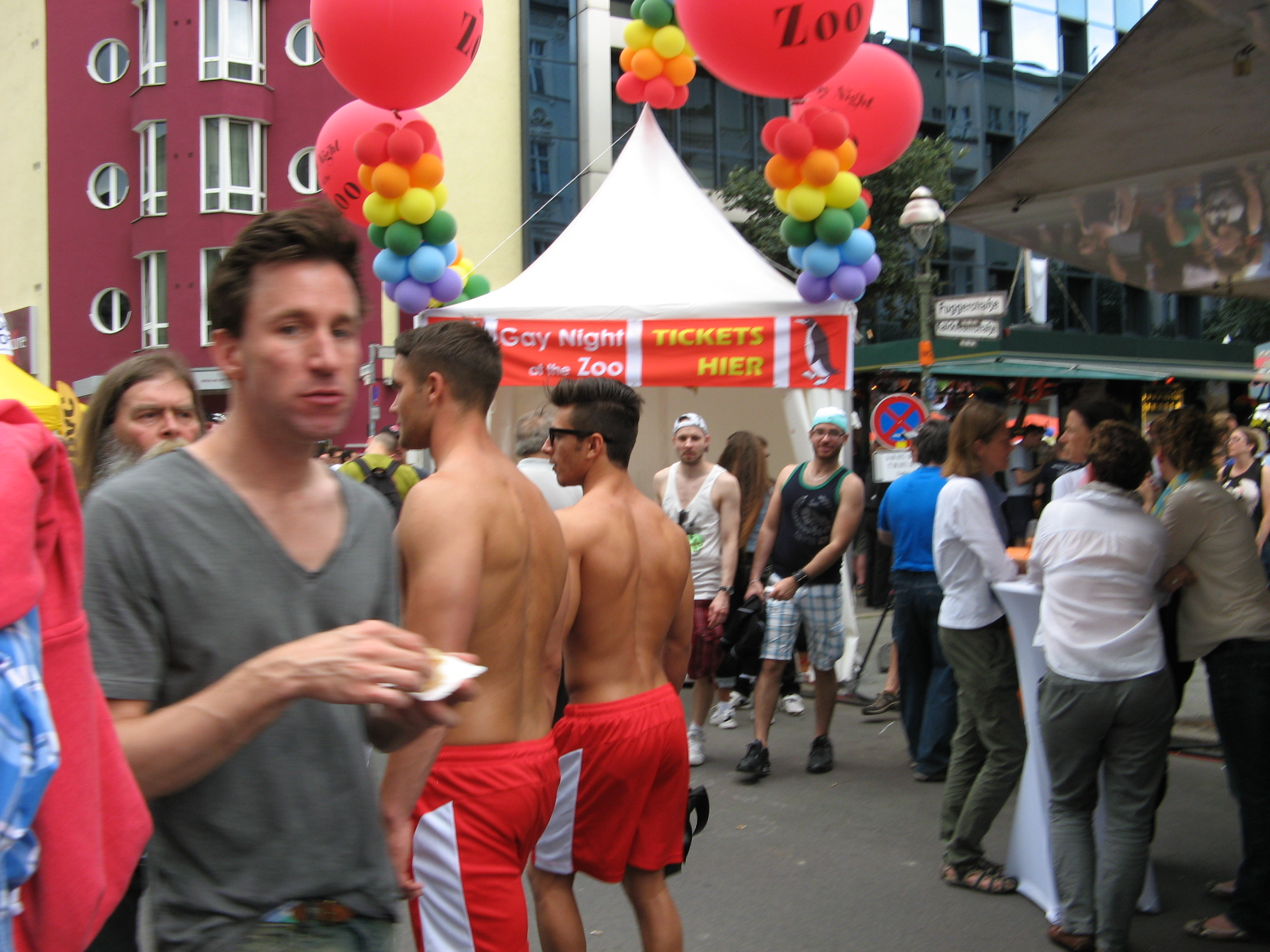

== See also ==
- Berlin Pride
- Kreuzberg Pride
- Folsom Europe
- Easter Berlin
- Mahide Lein
