= Viktoria-Luise-Platz =

Square in Berlin, Germany

Coordinates: 52°29′45″N 13°20′31″E

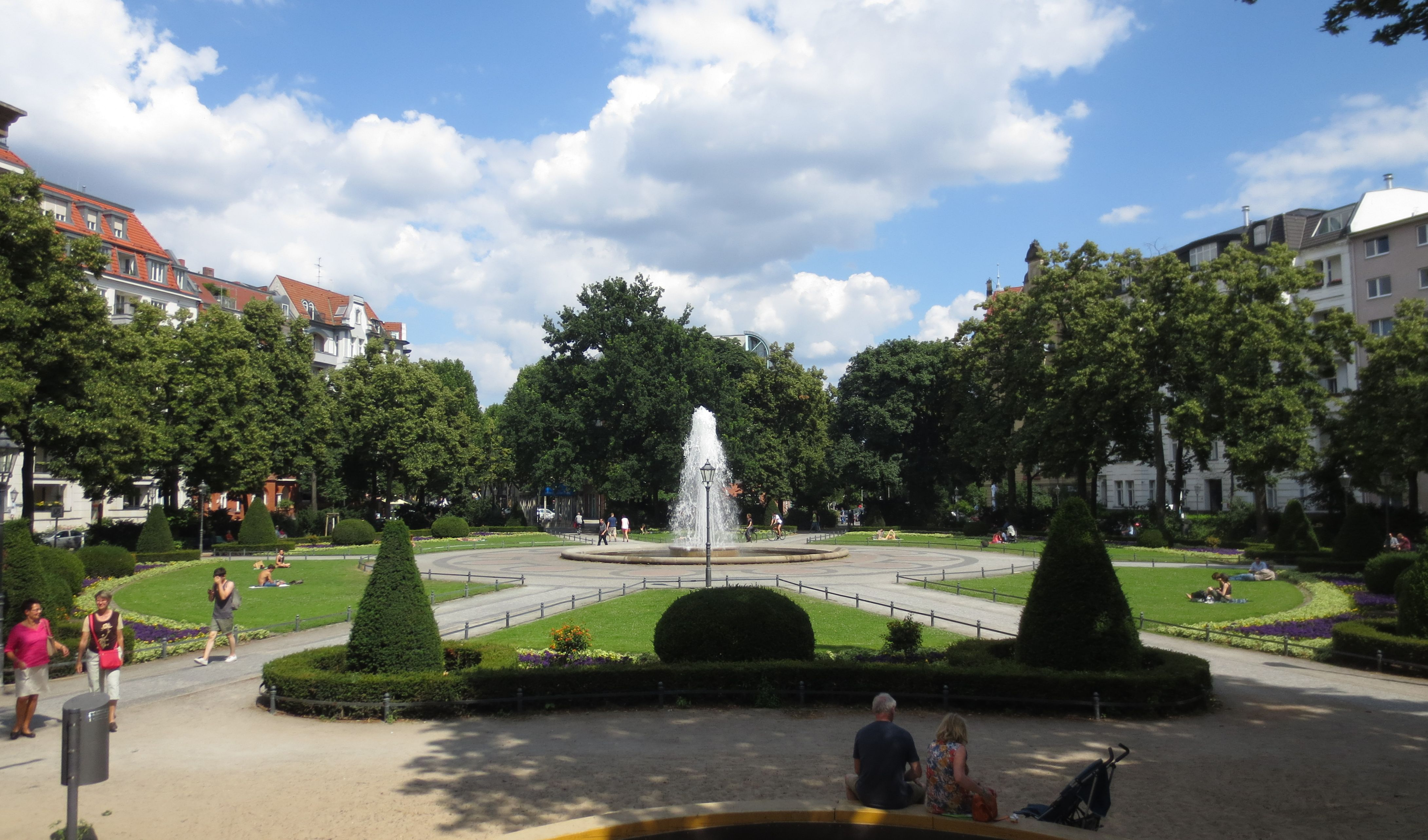
Gardens and fountain at Viktoria-Luise-Platz

Viktoria-Luise-Platz is a hexagonal place on Motzstraße in Schöneberg, Berlin. It was laid out in 1900. It is named after Princess Viktoria Luise of Prussia 1892 - 1980, the daughter of Kaiser Wilhelm II of Germany, and Great-Grand daughter of Queen Victoria. It is served by Viktoria-Luise-Platz station on the U4 line of the Berlin U-Bahn.
