= Nollendorfplatz =

Square in Schöneberg, Berlin, Germany

Coordinates: 52°29′57″N 13°21′14″E

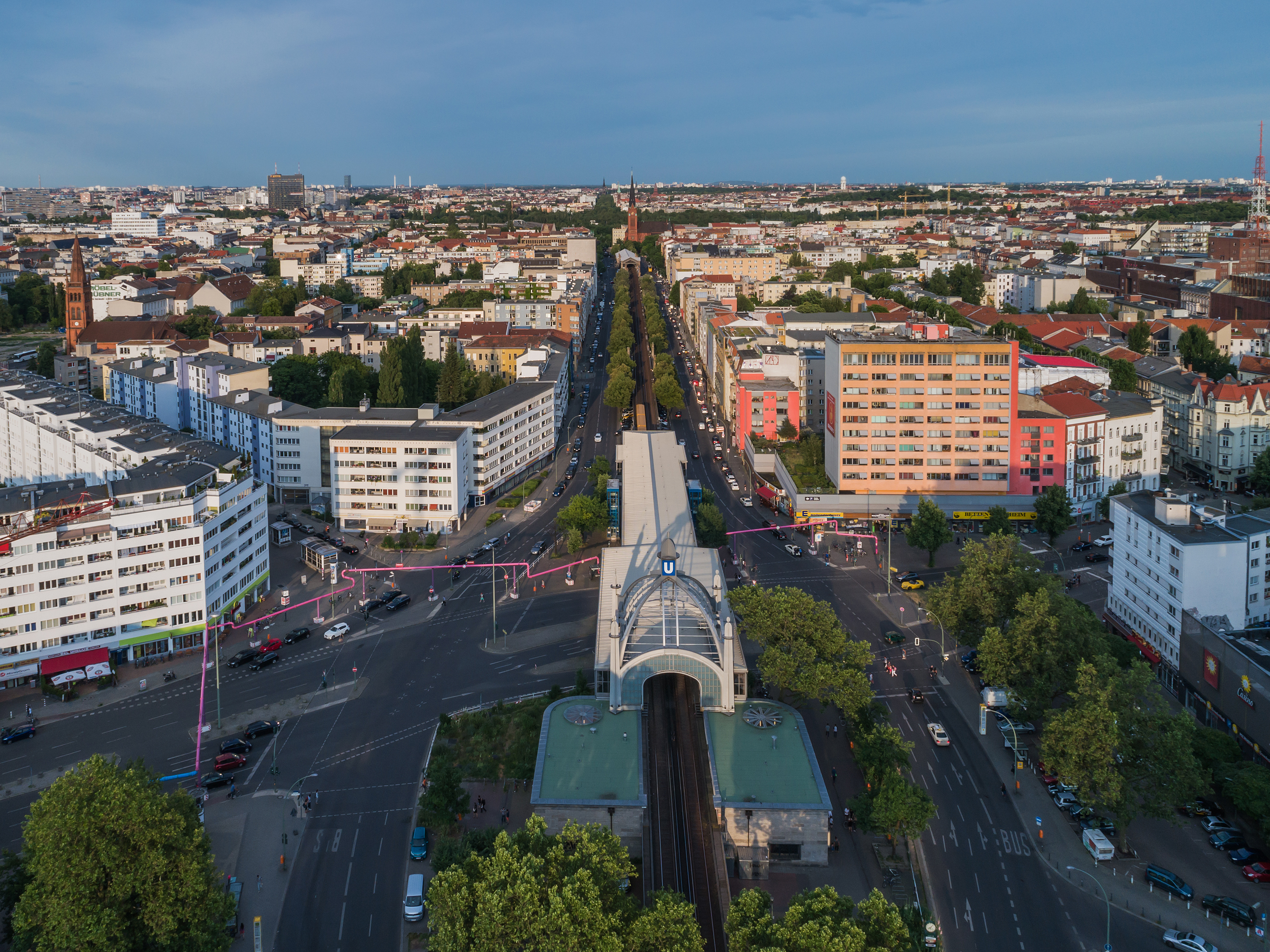
Aerial view

Nollendorfplatz (colloquially called Nolle or Nolli) is a square in the central Schöneberg district of Berlin, Germany.

== History ==
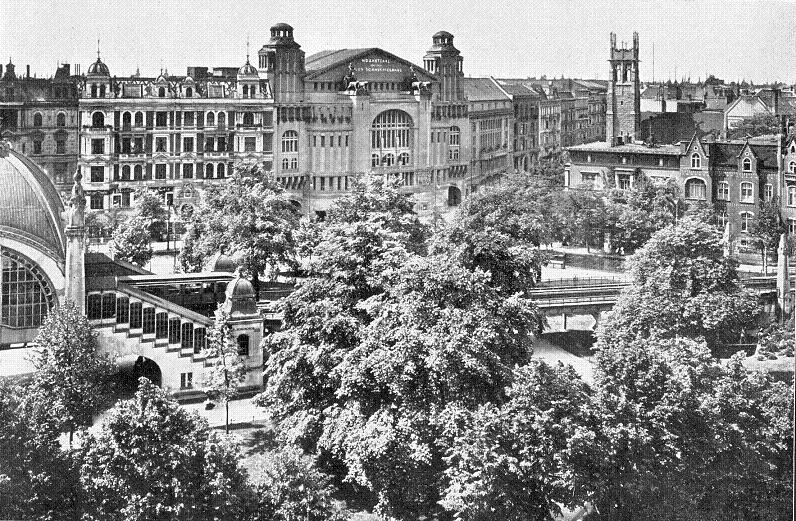
Nollendorfplatz with Neues Schauspielhaus (twin-turrets) and steeple of the American Church, about 1903

The place was named on November 27, 1864 after the village of Nollendorf (Czech: Nakléřov) near Petrovice in the present-day Czech Republic, a site of the 1813 Battle of Kulm where the united forces of the Sixth Coalition defeated a French army under Dominique Vandamme. The victorious Prussian troops were led by General Friedrich von Kleist, who in turn was elevated to a "Count of Nollendorf" by King Frederick William III. The adjacent Kleiststraße leads from Nollendorfplatz to Wittenbergplatz in the west.

The extended square was laid out according to the Hobrecht-Plan of 1862, then part of a larger road link from Charlottenburg through Schöneberg to the Berlin district of Kreuzberg in the manner of a Parisian boulevard, named after victorious Prussian generals (therefore colloquially called Generalszug in German). During the Wilhelmine era, in 1902, the first Berlin U-Bahn line (Stammstrecke) was inaugurated, which ran under Kleiststraße up to the elevated railway at Nollendorfplatz station, built according to plans designed by Cremer & Wolffenstein architects.

== Gay village ==
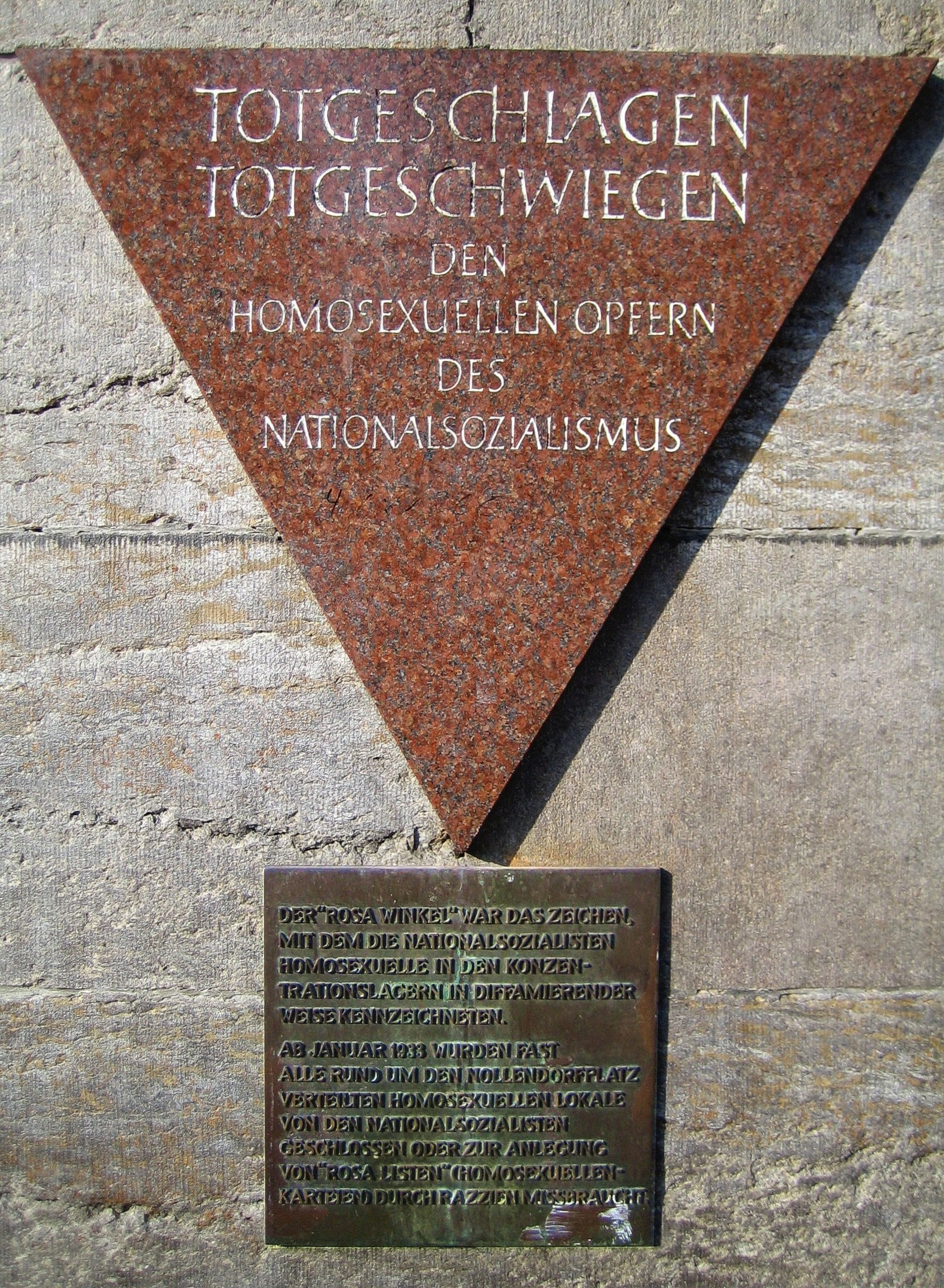
Pink Triangle memorial

During the Weimar Republic, the well-known gay nightclub Eldorado was located on Motzstraße. During 1932, the club was seized by the Nazis and used as the Sturmabteilung (SA) headquarters.

This area was severely damaged by the bombing of Berlin in World War II, the square today is shaped by the rebuilt U-Bahn viaduct and the facade of the historic Neues Schauspielhaus theatre, supplemented by numerous new buildings. The adjacent area in the south around Motzstraße is Berlin's most prominent gay village and site of the annual Lesbian and Gay City Festival.

Nollendorfplatz has a long history as being a gay area which dates back to the turn of the 20th century, perpetuated by The Berlin Stories of Christopher Isherwood, the writings of W. H. Auden, Klaus Mann, and many others. Within the gay community this part of Berlin is most famous for its leather and darkroom bars. It also plays a little role in the musical Cabaret by Joe Masteroff as the home of some of the characters. A memorial plaque at the U-Bahn station commemorates the persecution of homosexuals in Nazi Germany and the Holocaust.

== Notable people ==
- Georg Büchmann (1822–1884), philologist, lived on the corner of Bülowstraße
- Samuel von Fischer (1859–1934), publisher, ran his S. Fischer Verlag on Bülowstraße from 1897 onwards
- Rudolf Steiner (1861–1925), philosopher, lived on Motzstraße from 1903
- Lesser Ury (1861–1931), painter, lived on Nollendorfplatz No. 1 from 1920
- Frank Wedekind (1864–1918), playwright, lived on nearby Kurfürstenstraße
- Else Lasker-Schüler (1869–1945), poet, lived on Motzstraße between 1924 and 1933
- Max Beckmann (1884–1950), painter, lived on Nollendorfplatz No. 6
- Wilhelm Furtwängler (1886–1954), conductor, was born in the former house on the corner of Maaßenstraße
- Nelly Sachs (1891–1970), poet, was born on Maaßenstraße
- Walter Benjamin (1892–1940), philosopher, spent his childhood on Kurfürstenstraße
- Walter Mehring (1896–1981), author, was born on nearby Derfflingerstraße
- Ödön von Horváth (1901–1938 Paris), writer, lived on Motzstraße in the late 1920s
- Christopher Isherwood (1904–1986), novelist, lived on Nollendorfstraße between 1929 and 1933
- Jean Ross (1911–1973), cabaret singer and writer, lived on Nollendorfstraße between 1930 and 1932
Nollendorfplatz

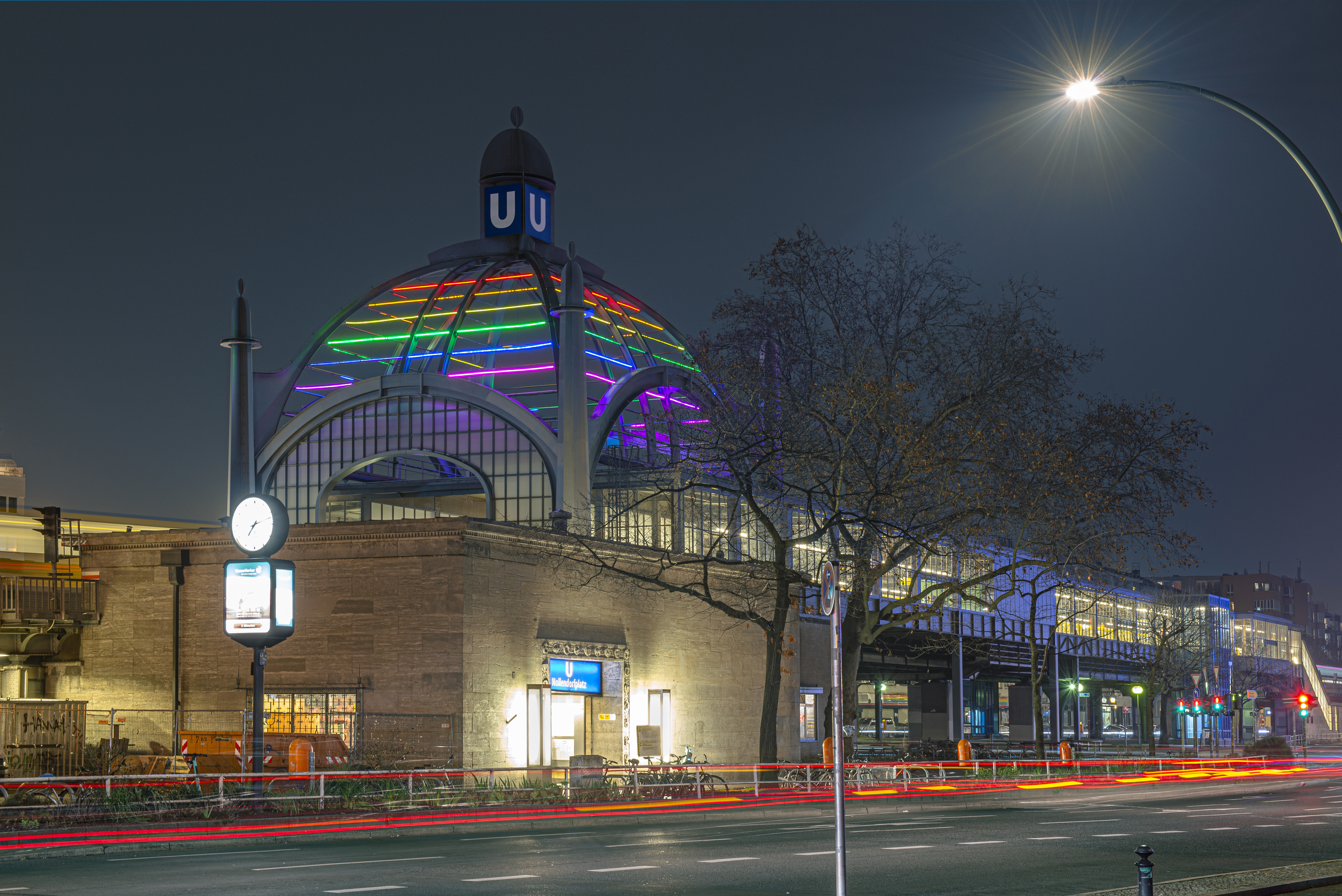
Metrotrain at Nollendorfplatz

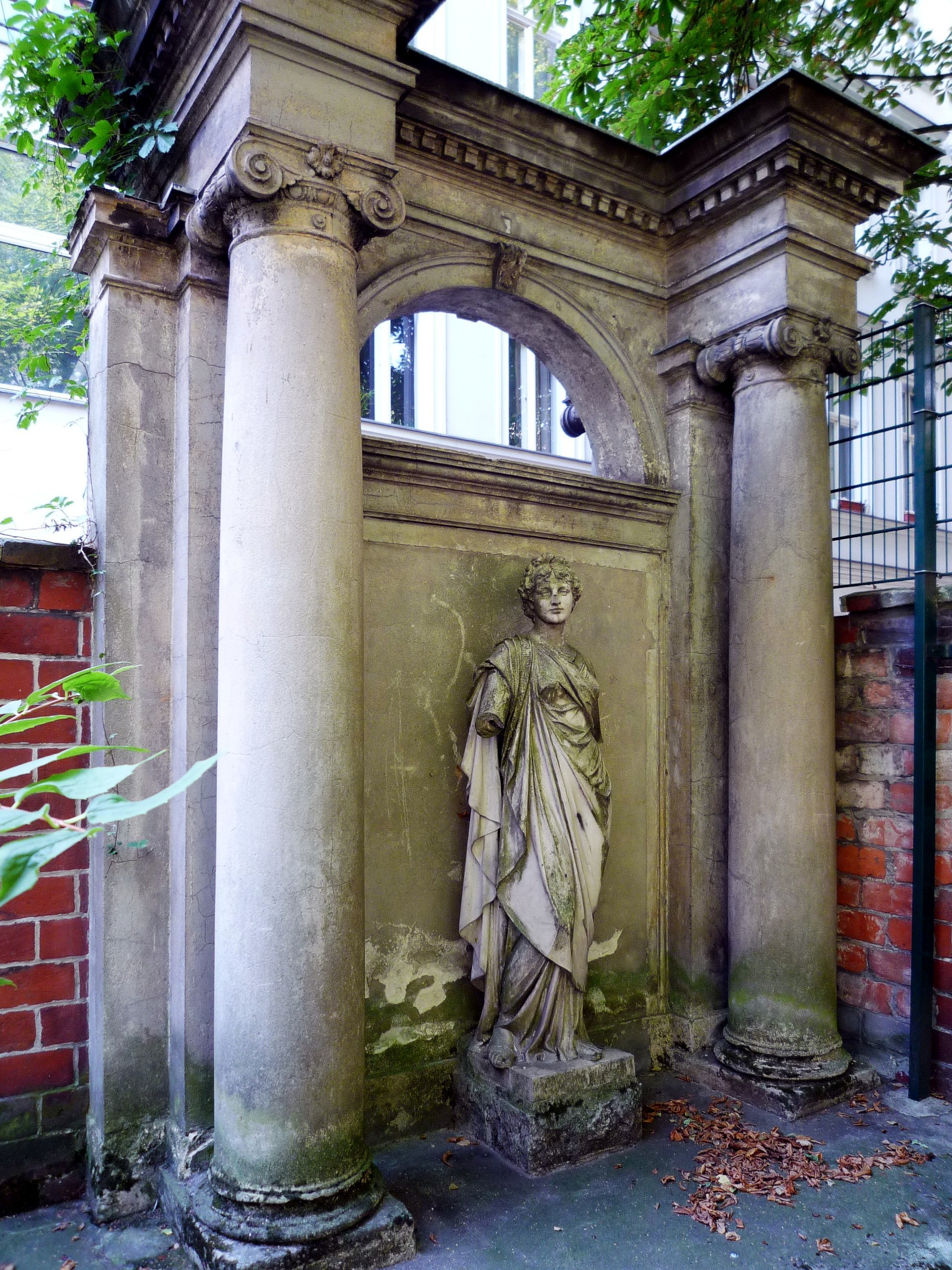
Pieces of Amerikanische Kirche (American Church)

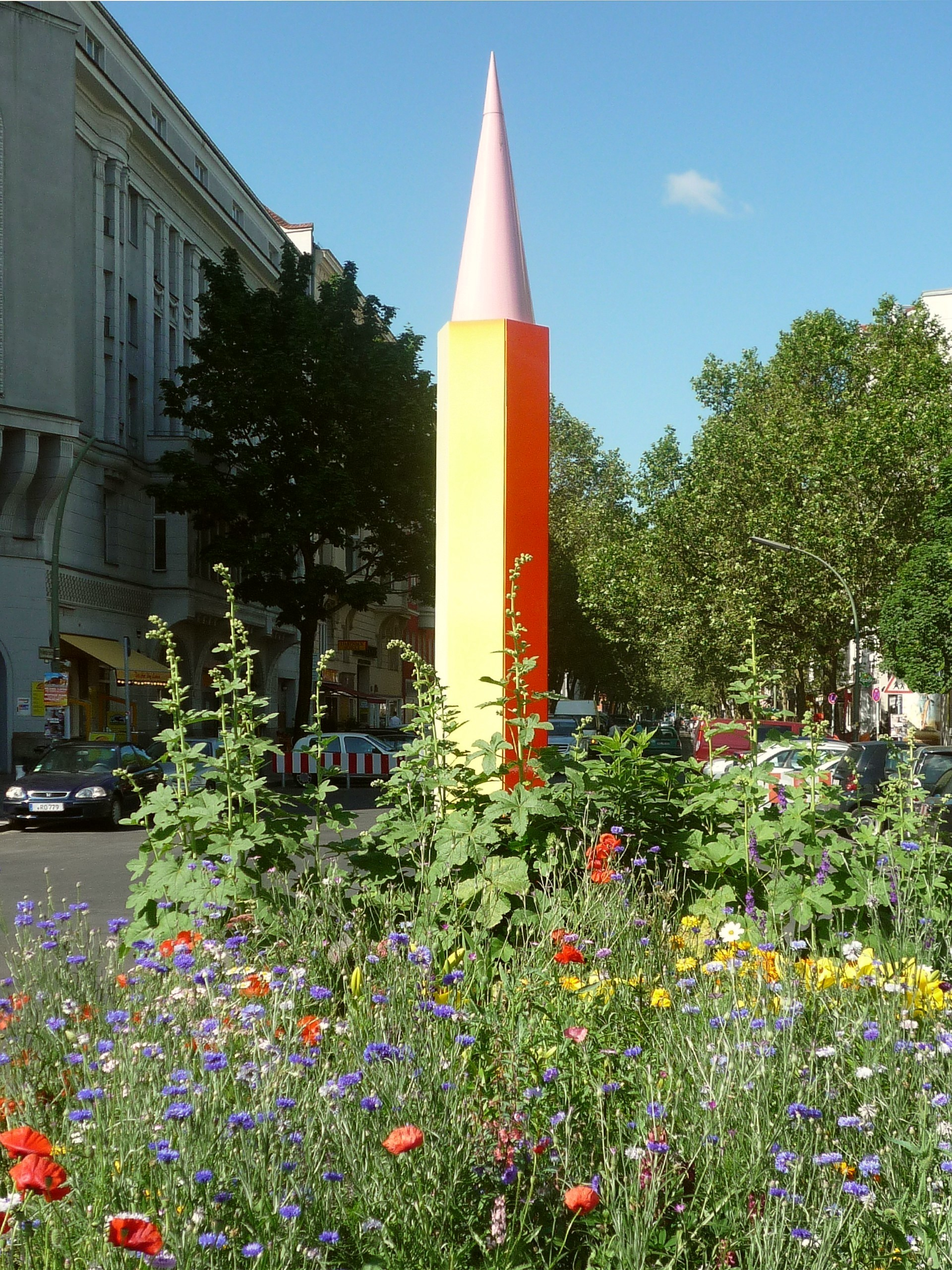
Rainbow Gay Column

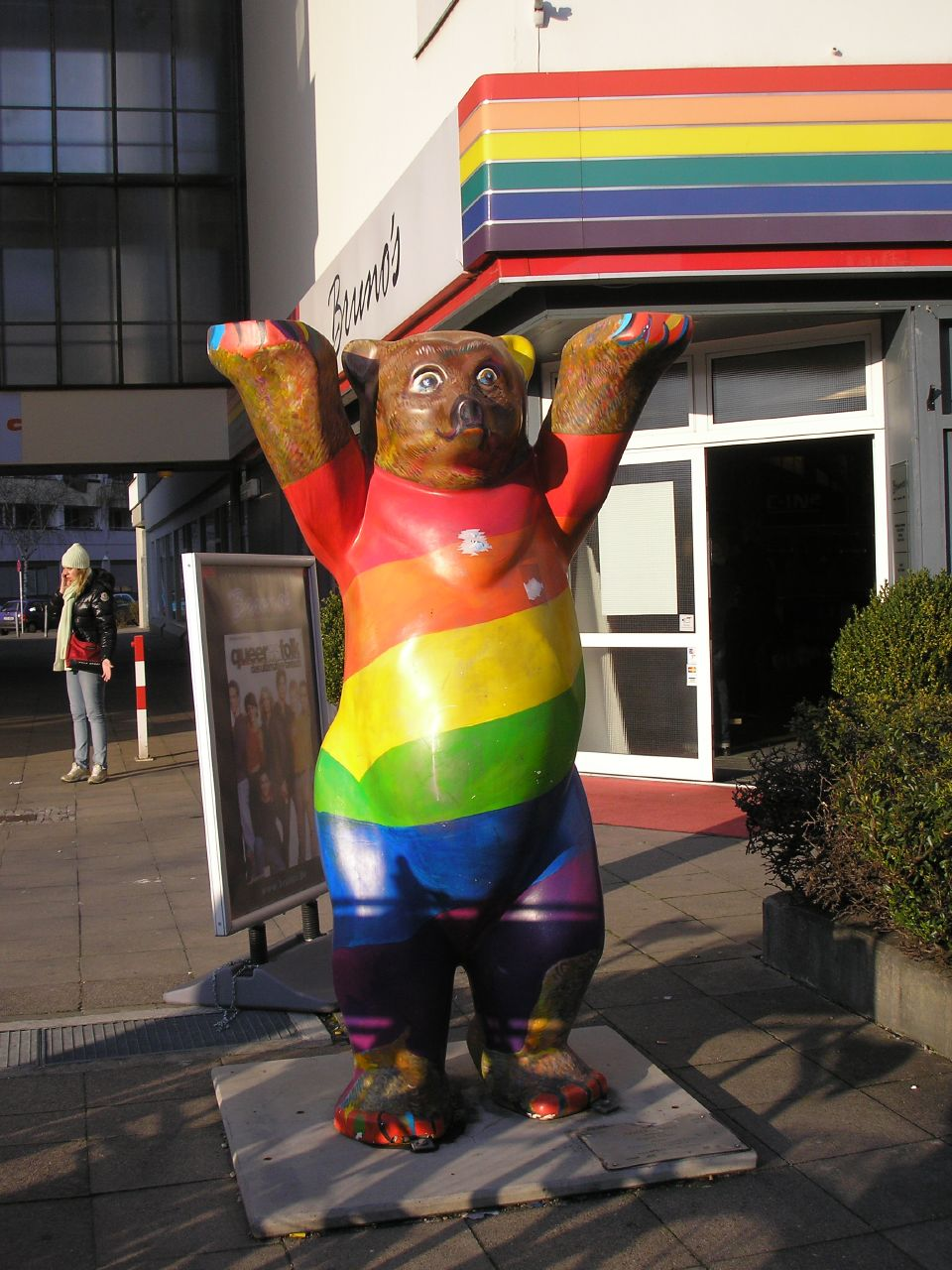
Gay Bear at Nollendorfplatz

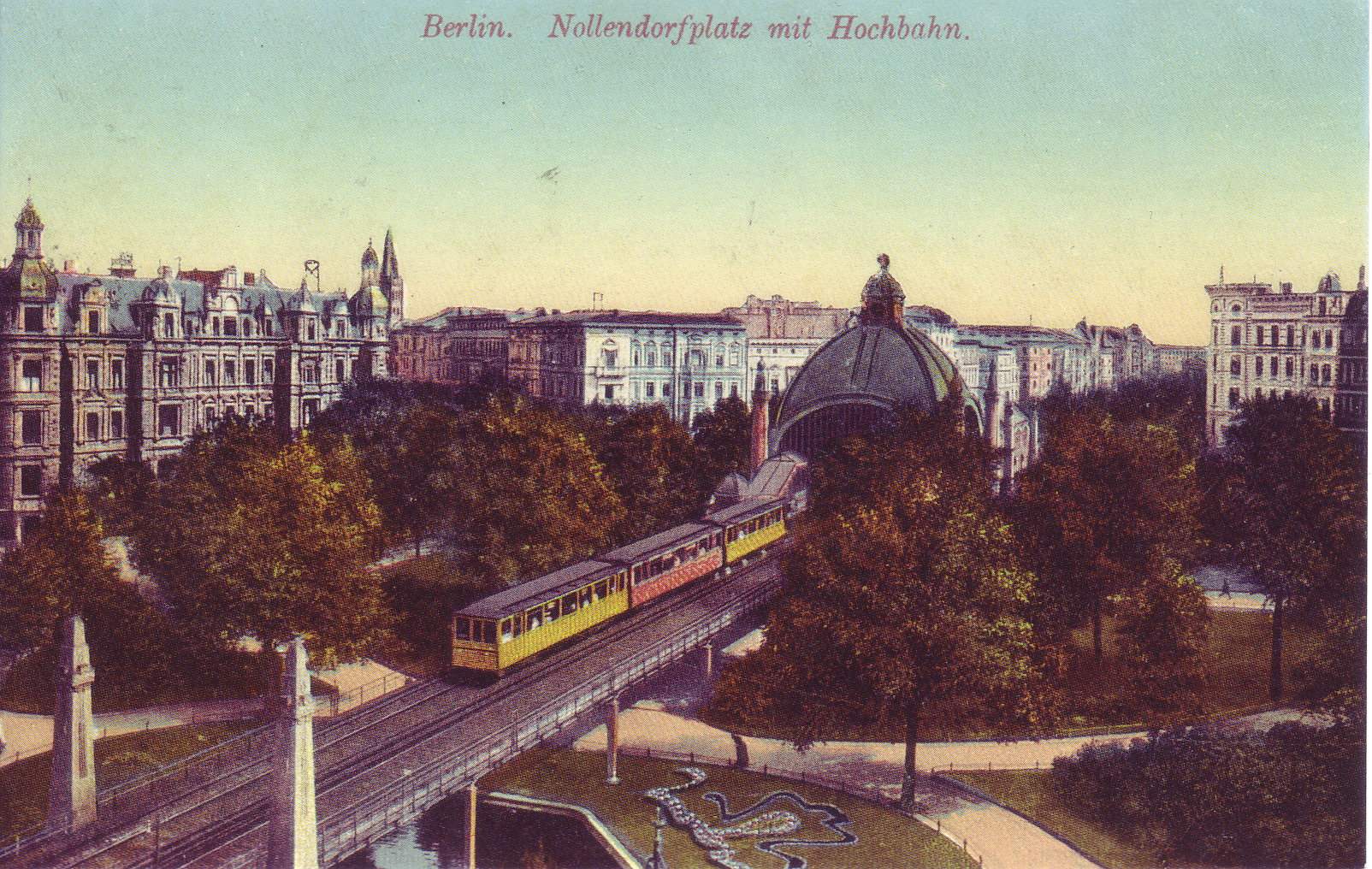
Nollendorfplatz, around 1900

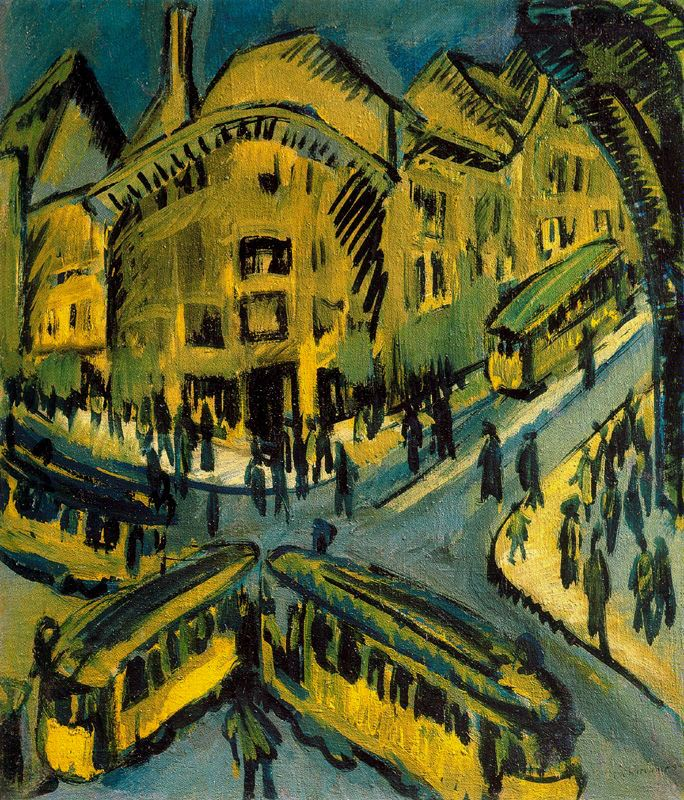
Nollendorfplatz by Ernst Ludwig Kirchner 1912

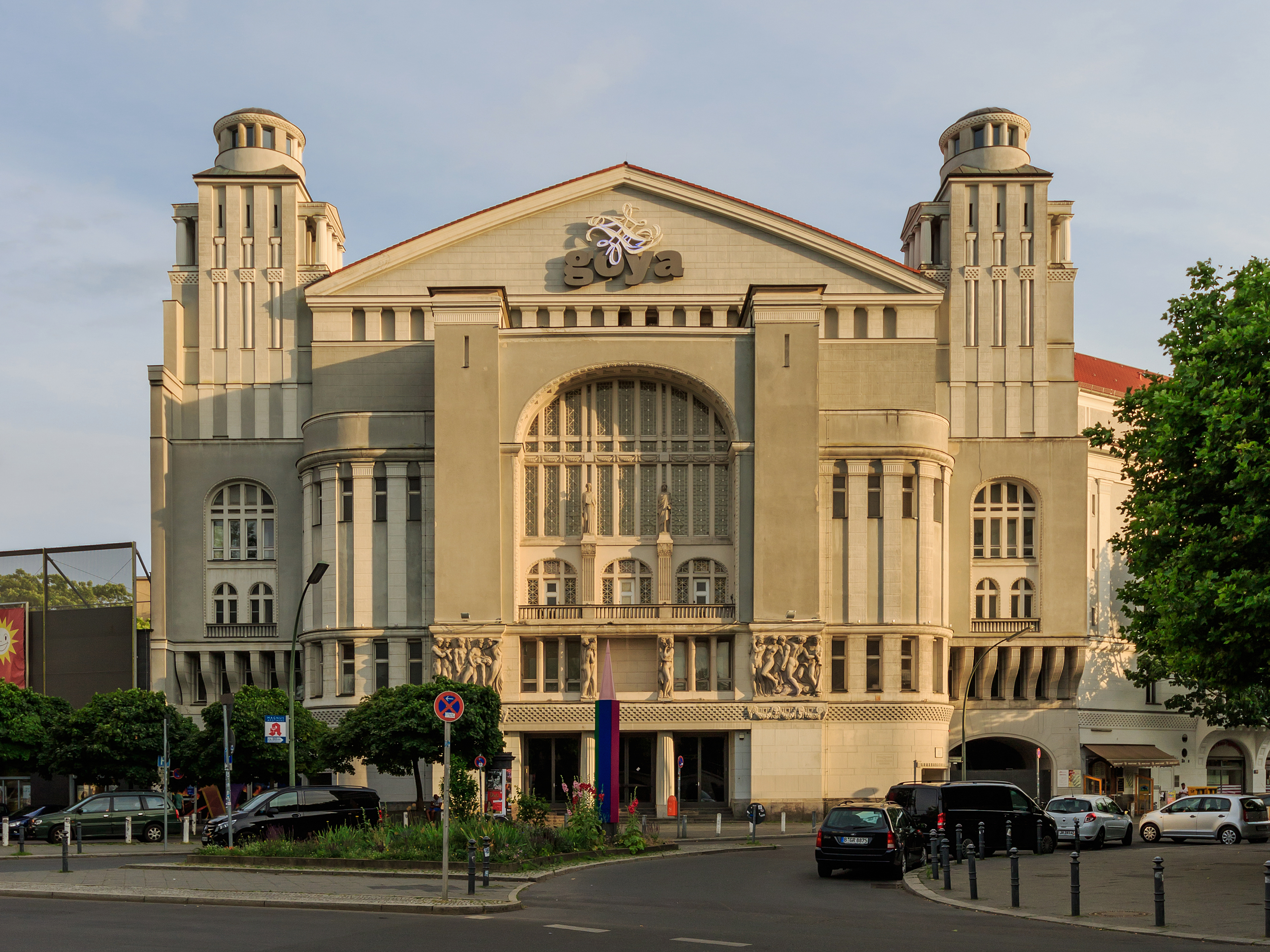
Neues Schauspielhaus

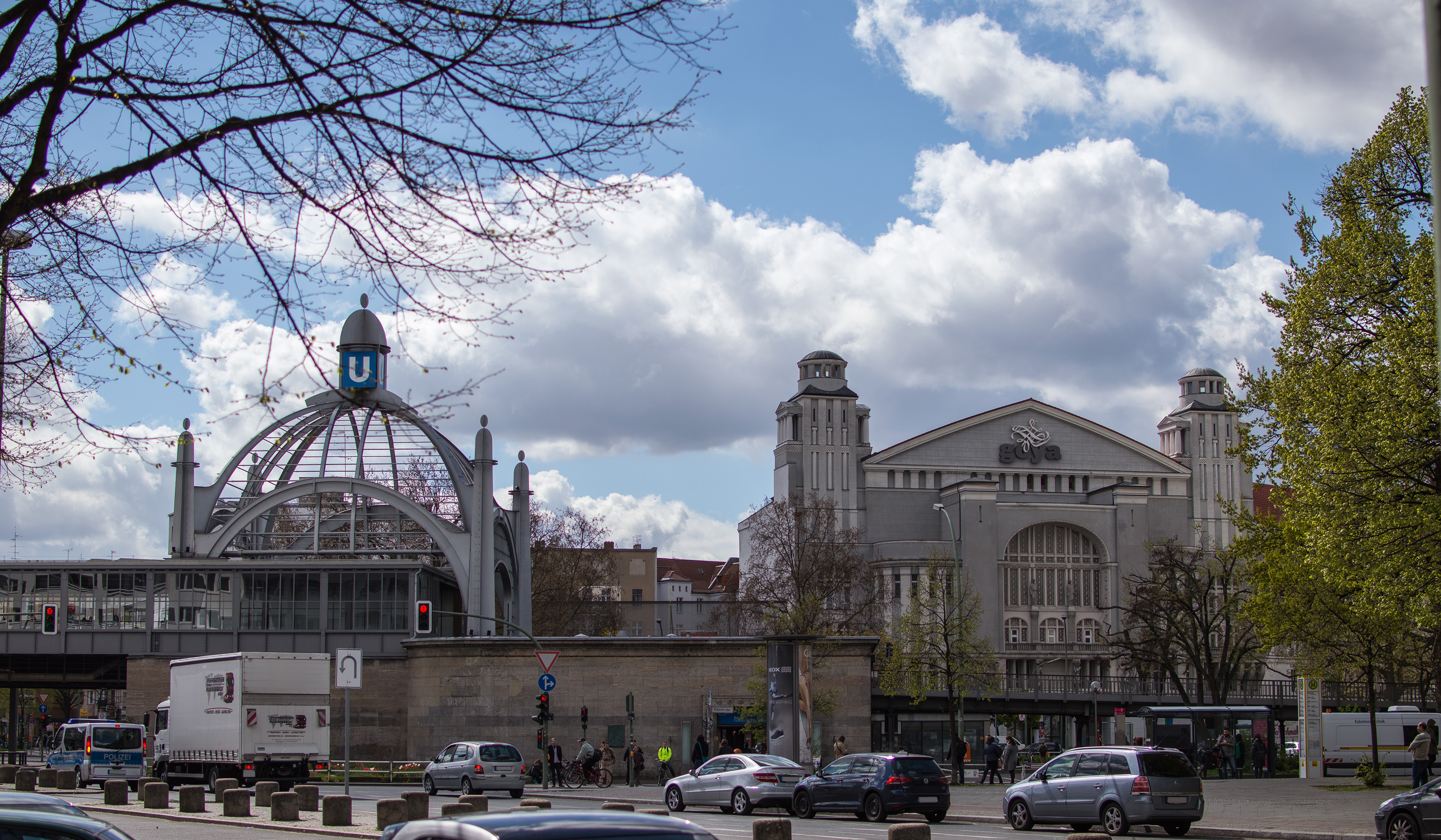
Nollendorfplatz station and Neues Schauspielhaus

== Literature ==
- Susanne Twardawa: Der Nollendorfplatz in Berlin. Motzbuch, Berlin 2001, ISBN 3-935790-02-3
