= Metropol (Berlin) =

Former theatre and concert hall

Coordinates: 52°29′56″N 13°21′10″E

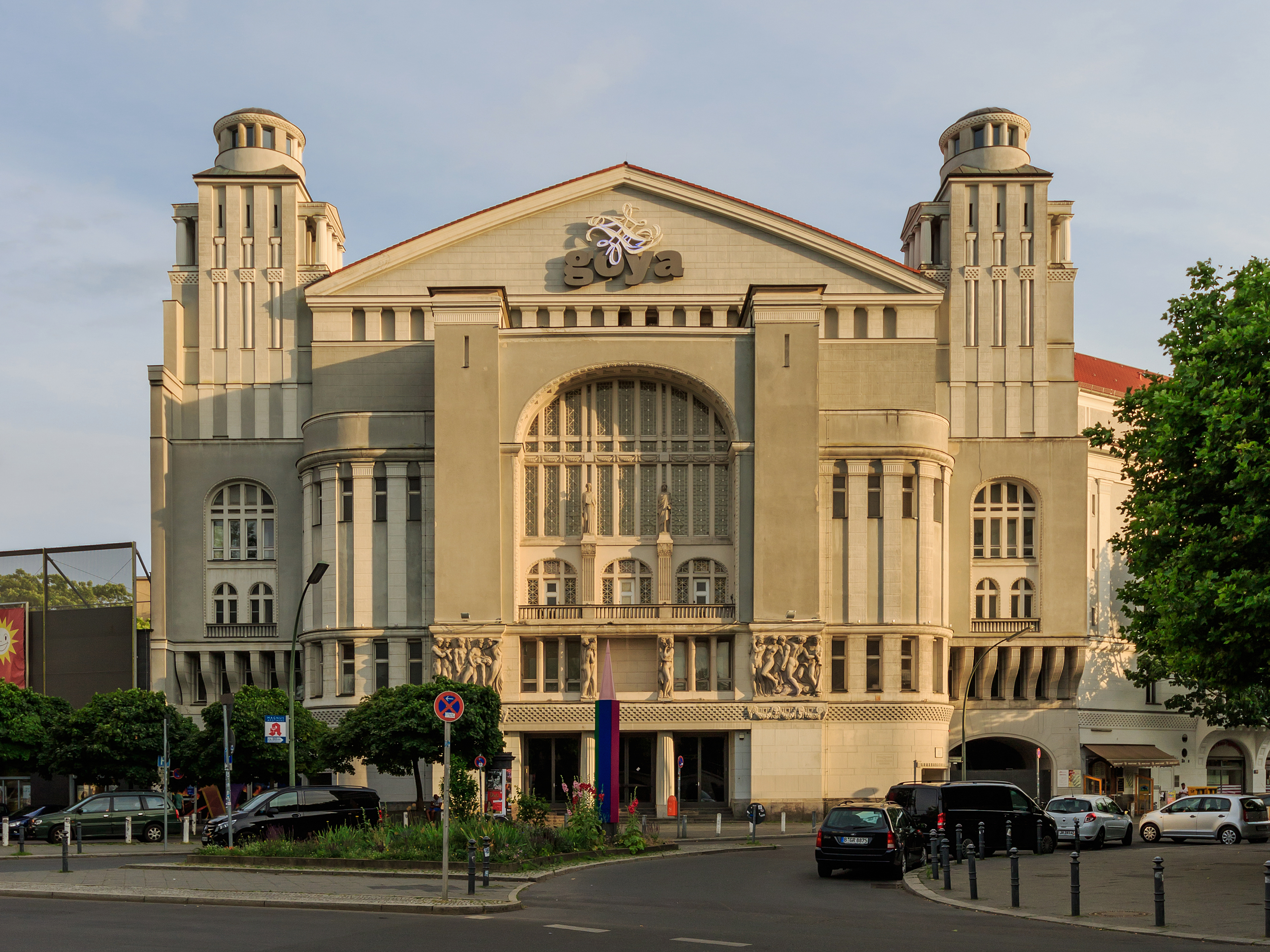
Metropol

The Metropol, formerly Neues Schauspielhaus (English: New Theatre), at 5 Nollendorfplatz in the Schöneberg district of Berlin was built in 1905 as a theatre, with a separate concert hall (the Mozartsaal) above, in the then-fashionable Art Nouveau style. In 1911 the Mozartsaal was converted into a cinema with 925 seats.

From the beginning of World War I the theatre turned into an operetta stage until in 1927, Erwin Piscator and Tilla Durieux opened their Theater am Nollendorfplatz in the building. Piscator created critical performances by playwrights like Ernst Toller and Walter Mehring, with artists like Bertolt Brecht, George Grosz and John Heartfield at times working with him. Piscator's theater went bankrupt in 1929, and he emigrated in 1931. After the Nazi takeover the house became an operetta theatre once again, now under the direction of Harald Paulsen.

While the auditorium was destroyed in World War II, the facade as well as the cinema survived and in 1951 was renamed the Metropol. Since 1977 it has been used as a discothèque and became a famous music club during the 1980s heyday of West Berlin, frequented by bands like Depeche Mode, Morrissey, The Cross, The Human League and Front 242. For a short time in 2000 it was the location of the KitKatClub and in 2005 the architect Hans Kollhoff remodeled the interior as the Goya night club. In 2019 it was reopened as the Metropol.

== Cultural references ==
Wim Wenders's 1987 film Wings of Desire includes a segment filmed during a Nick Cave concert in this venue. Dario Argento and Lamberto Bava used the building (and the existing logo of the Metropol-discotheque) in Demons.
