= American Church in Berlin =

Church in Berlin

The American Church in Berlin (ACB) (Amerikanische Kirche in Berlin) is an ecumenical and international congregation in Berlin that was established in the 19th century.

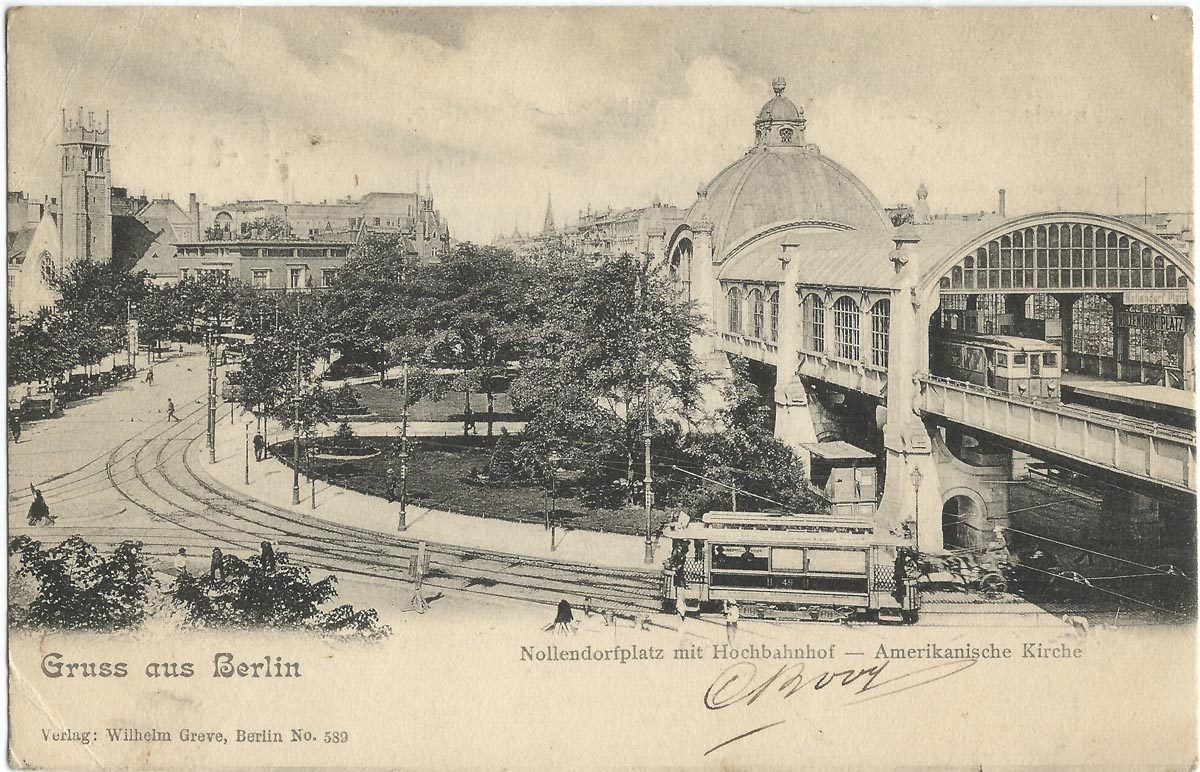
Nollendorfplatz with the gable and tower of the American Church (left) at the entering Motzstraße and the Nollendorfplatz overhead station, 1905

ACB's members come from more than seventeen Christian denominations and from more than thirty different nations. The congregation is loosely affiliated with the Evangelical Lutheran Church in America, from which the congregation receives clergy support.

== History ==
The origins of the church date back to about 1865, when American families met in private homes to worship. Otto March, father of the architects Walter and Werner March, planned and directed the construction of a church for the congregation between 1898 and 1903. This church building stood in the "American quarter" of Berlin-Schöneberg, on Motzstraße #6, near Nollendorfplatz.

The Nollendorfplatz church was destroyed in an Allied bombing of Berlin in 1944. The congregation continued from 1945 by sharing facilities with various German churches in Berlin-Zehlendorf, for the most part in Zehlendorf's Alte Dorfkirche.

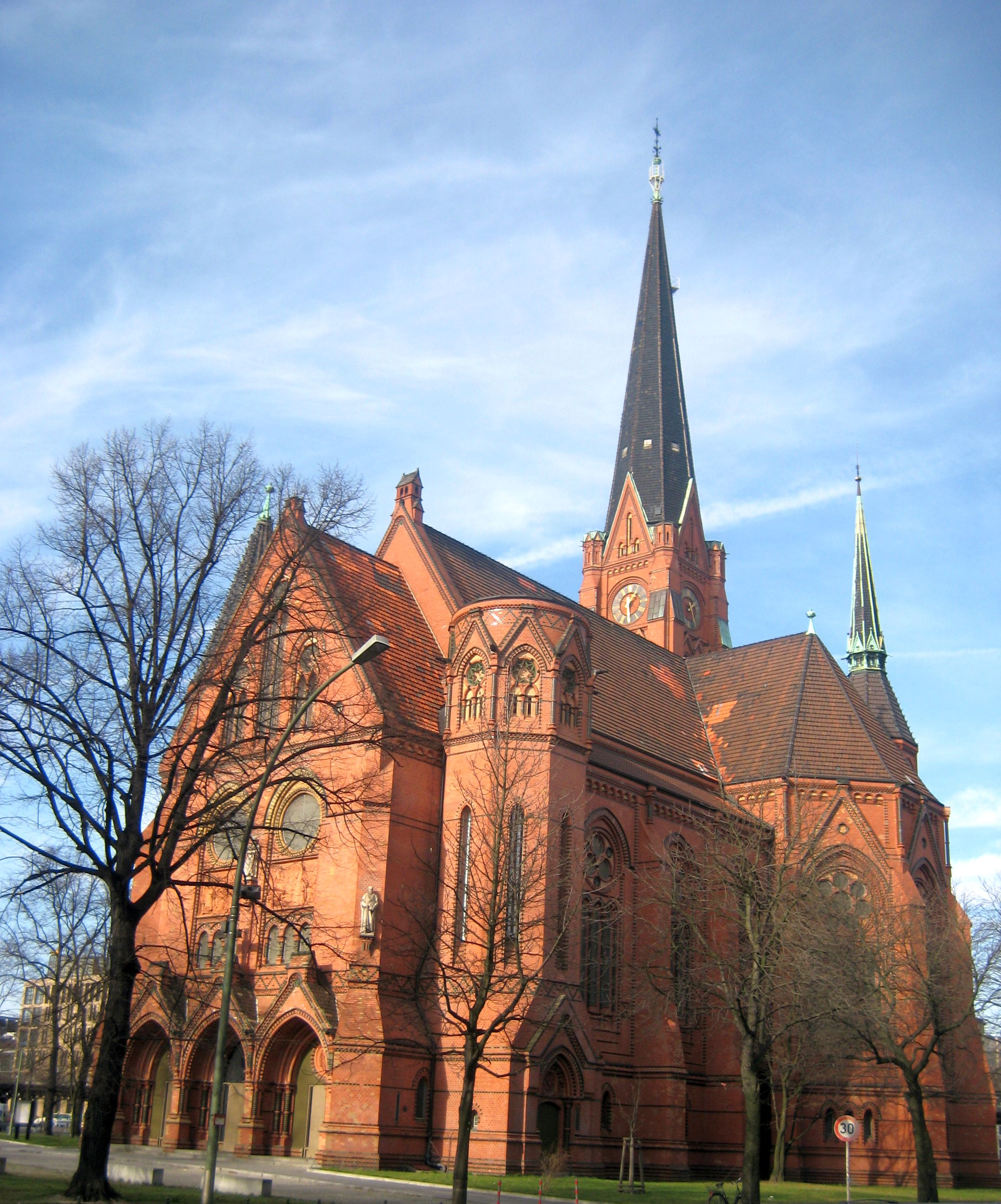
Luther Church on Dennewitzplatz, seen from southeast.

On 8 November 2002 ACB moved into the Luther Church on Dennewitzplatz in Schöneberg, only a few city blocks away from the original sanctuary that was destroyed in 1944.

== Today ==
The American Church in Berlin is an active English-speaking worshiping community in Berlin. They hold services each Sunday in the Lutherkirche on Dennewitzplatz. They also offer Christian education programs for children, youth, and adults.

The congregation has been involved in the Berlin-wide program "Laib und Seele" since 2005. This missions program facilitates produce pick-ups from surrounding grocery stores to be distributed to neighborhood families in need each Friday.

== See also ==
- American Church in Paris
- American Church in Rome

== Sources ==
- Stewart Winfield Herman, American Church in Berlin: a history, 1978
