= Schöneberg =

- Quarter of Berlin
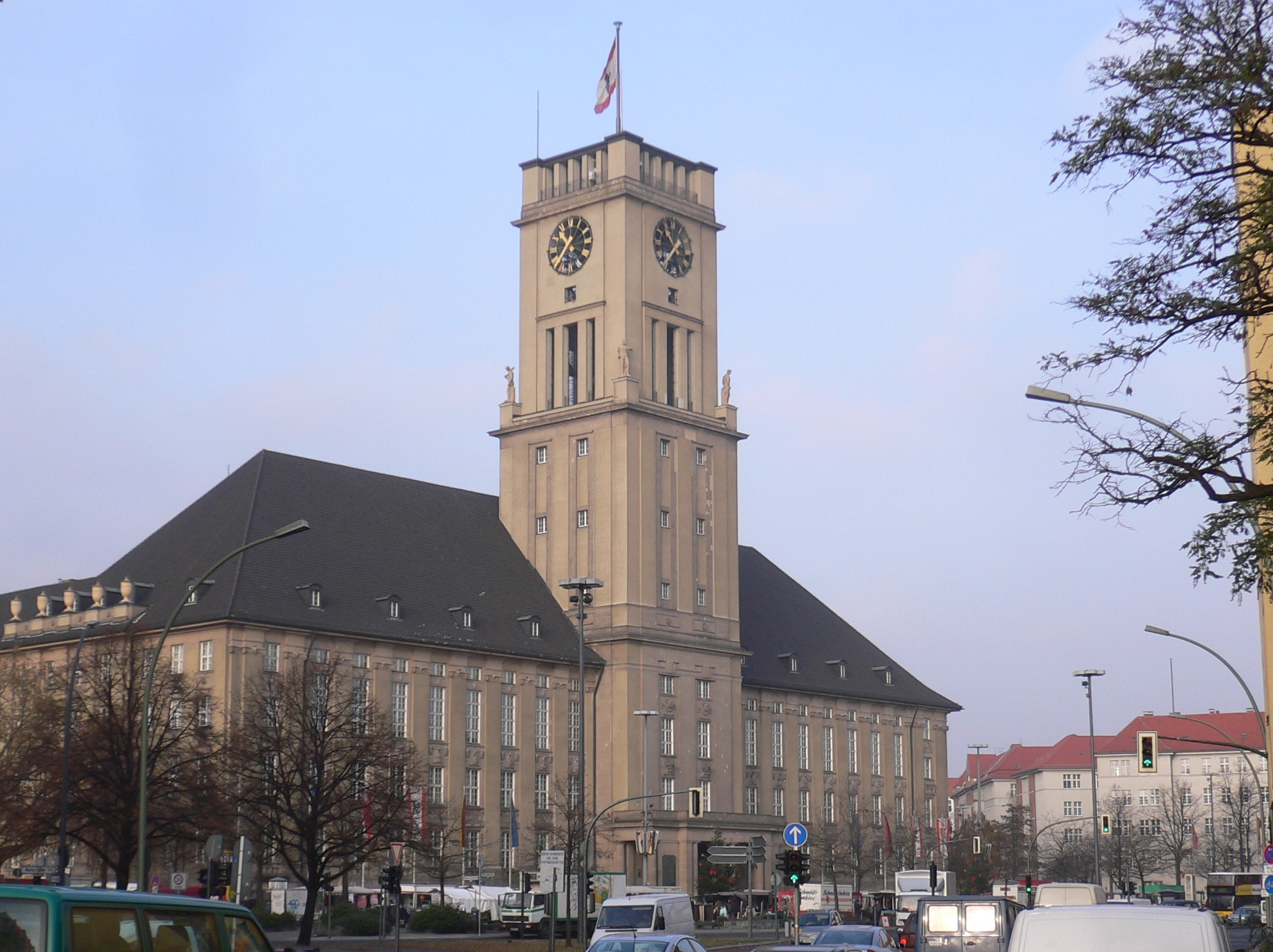
- Schöneberg Town Hall

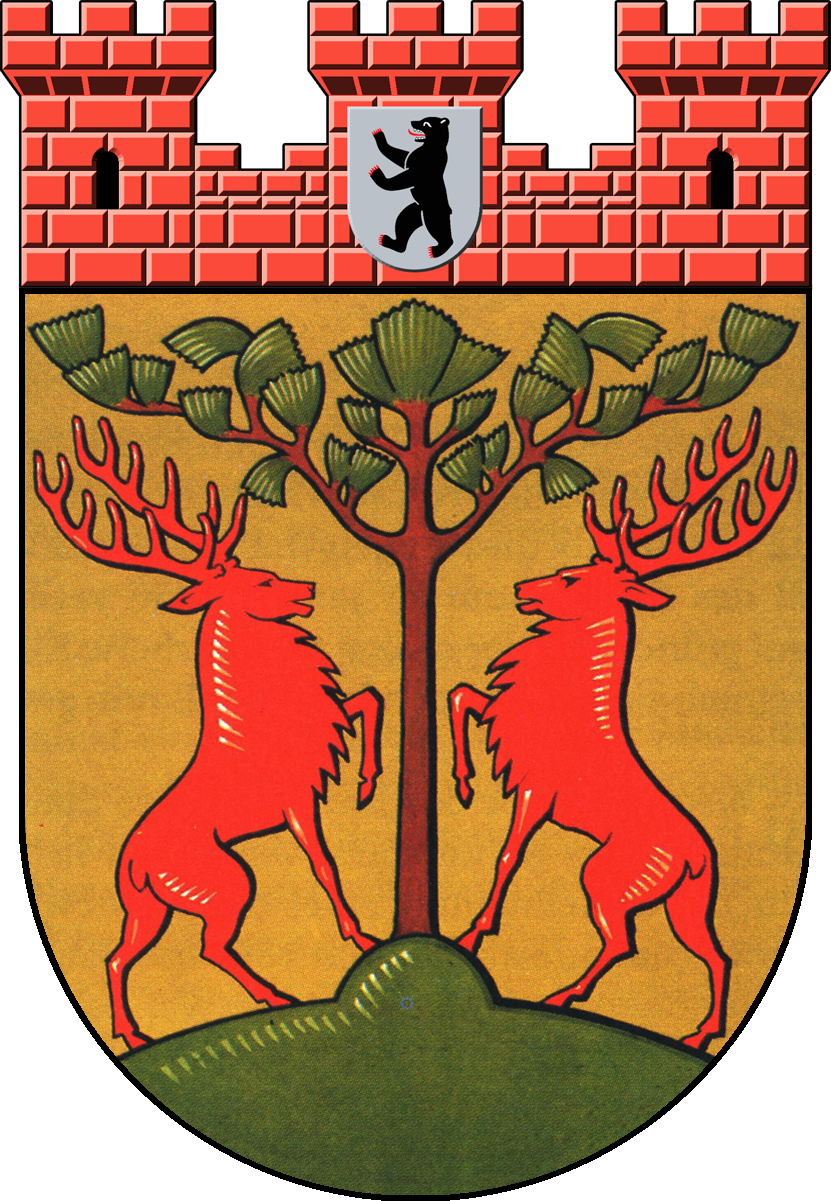
- Coat of arms

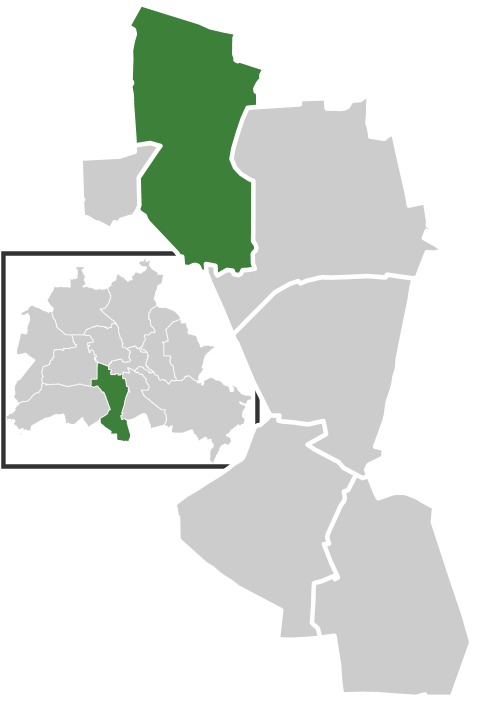
- Location of Schöneberg in Tempelhof-Schöneberg and Berlin
- Interactive map of Schöneberg
- Location within Germany Location within Berlin
- Coordinates: 52°29′10″N 13°21′20″E
- Country: Germany
- State: Berlin
- City: Berlin
- Borough: Tempelhof-Schöneberg
- Founded: 1264

Area
  - Total: 10.6 km^{2} (4.1 sq mi)
- Elevation: 50 m (160 ft)

Population (2024-12-31)
  - Total: 125,060
  - Density: 11,800/km^{2} (30,600/sq mi)
- Time zone: UTC+01:00 (CET)
  - Summer (DST): UTC+02:00 (CEST)
- Postal codes: 10777, 10779, 10781, 10783, 10787, 10789, 10823, 10825, 10827, 10829, 12157, 12159, 12161, 12169
- Vehicle registration: B

Schöneberg (German: [ˈʃøːnəbɛʁk]) is a locality of Berlin, Germany. Until Berlin's 2001 administrative reform it was a separate borough including the locality of Friedenau. Together with the former borough of Tempelhof it is now part of the new borough of Tempelhof-Schöneberg.

== History ==
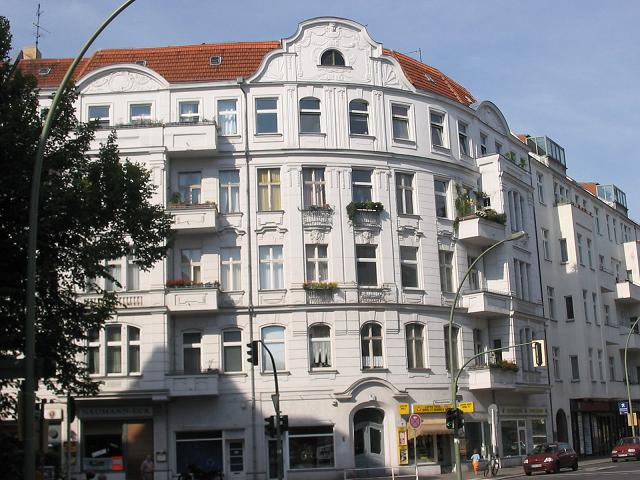
Gründerzeit building on the Rote Insel

The village was first documented in a 1264 deed issued by Margrave Otto III of Brandenburg. In 1751, Bohemian weavers founded Neu-Schöneberg also known as Böhmisch-Schöneberg along northern Hauptstraße. During the Seven Years' War on 7 October 1760 Schöneberg and its village church were completely destroyed by a fire due to the joint attack on Berlin by Habsburg and Russian troops.

Both Alt-Schöneberg and Neu-Schöneberg were in an area developed in the course of industrialisation and incorporated in a street network laid out in the Hobrecht-Plan in an area that came to be known architecturally as the Wilhelmine Ring. The two villages were not combined as one entity until 1874 and received town privileges in 1898. In the following year it was disentangled from the Kreis of Teltow, and became a Prussian Stadtkreis (independent city). Many of the former peasants gained wealth by selling their acres to the settlement companies of growing Berlin and built luxurious mansions on Hauptstraße. Schöneberg Town Hall was completed in 1914. In 1920, Schöneberg became a part of Greater Berlin. Subsequent to World War II the Rathaus served as the city hall of West Berlin until 1991 when the administration of the reunited City of Berlin moved back to the Red Town Hall in Mitte.

=== Gay life ===
The area around Nollendorfplatz has been the heart of gay life in Berlin, since the 1920s and early–1930s during the Weimar Republic.

In December 1932, Berlin chief of police Kurt Melcher decreed the suppression of the city’s "depraved nightlife." This also included a prohibition on all "dance events of a homosexual nature." The Eldorado nightclub on Motzstraße was thus closed down slightly before the Nazis coming to power. Holocaust survivor Elsa Conrad co-ran the lesbian bar Mali und Igel. Inside the bar, was a club called Monbijou des Westens. The club was exclusive and catered for Berlin's lesbian, intellectual elite; one famous guest was the actress Marlene Dietrich. Each year the club hosted balls with up to 600 women in attendance.

The painter and printmaker Otto Dix used patrons of this establishment as subjects for some of his works. Christopher Isherwood lived just around the corner on Nollendorfstraße. This apartment was the basis for his book Goodbye to Berlin (1939) and later the musical Cabaret (1966), and the film version of Cabaret (1972) is commemorated by a historic plaque on the building.

== Quarters ==
The locality of Schöneberg includes the Stadtquartieres of Bayerisches Viertel (English: "Bavarian quarter"; an affluent residential area with streets named after Bavarian towns) and the Rote Insel (English: "red island") as well as Lindenhof and the large natural park area Südgelände (English: "south grounds") on the outside of the Ringbahn railway circle line.

== Popular sights ==
- Dorfkirche, the old village church, built in 1766
- Rathaus Schöneberg on John-F.-Kennedy-Platz (formerly Rudolph-Wilde-Platz, built in 1914), where, on 26 June 1963, U.S. President John F. Kennedy held his "Ich bin ein Berliner" speech in front of hundreds of thousands of enthusiastic spectators.
- Headquarters of the RIAS Berlin (Radio in the American Sector) from 1948 to 1993, then headquarters of DeutschlandRadio Berlin from 1994 until the station was renamed Deutschlandradio Kultur in 2005. The building was erected in 1941 by the IG Farben conglomerate.
- Former headquarters of the Berliner Verkehrsbetriebe (BVG), the public transport company of Berlin, on Potsdamer Straße
- Kaufhaus des Westens (KaDeWe), the largest department store in continental Europe, at Wittenbergplatz
- Heinrich-von-Kleist-Park, first laid out in 1656 by Elector Frederick William of Brandenburg as a nursery, later Berlin's Botanical Garden, which in 1910 moved to Dahlem. The Kammergericht appellate court building was erected within the park in 1913, together with two colonnades by Carl von Gontard from 1780, which had been moved here from the Alexanderplatz. On 8 August 1944 it was the site of the Volksgerichtshof show trial of members of the 20 July plot led by judge-president Roland Freisler. From 1945 onward, the building served as the seat of the Allied Control Council in Berlin. When the Soviet representatives left the Council in 1948, the Berlin Air Safety Centre remained there as the only four-power authority (besides Spandau Prison), while the rest of the building was empty. Today it again serves as the seat of the Kammergericht.
- Pallasstraße Hochbunker, a former air-raid shelter, built in 1943 by forced laborers. A large social housing estate was built in 1977 to partially bridge over the bunker and to cross the street, the former site of the Berlin Sportpalast. This is where Joseph Goebbels held his 1943 "Total War" speech. It was demolished in 1973. The present housing estate is known to Berliners as the Sozialpalast ("Social Palace").
- Lutherkirche at Denewitzplatz, which now houses the American Church in Berlin.
Schöneberg

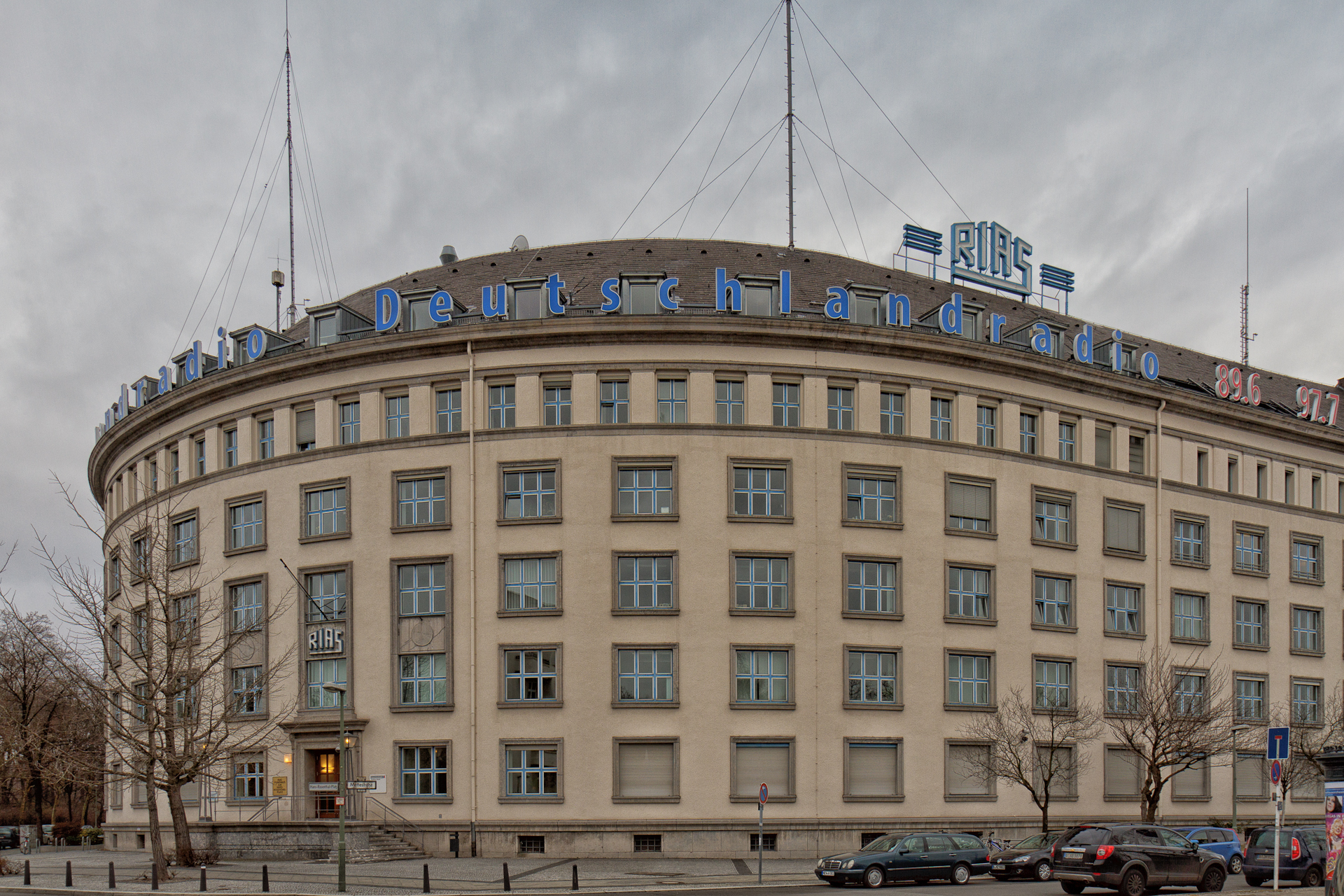
The RIAS building in Berlin-Schöneberg

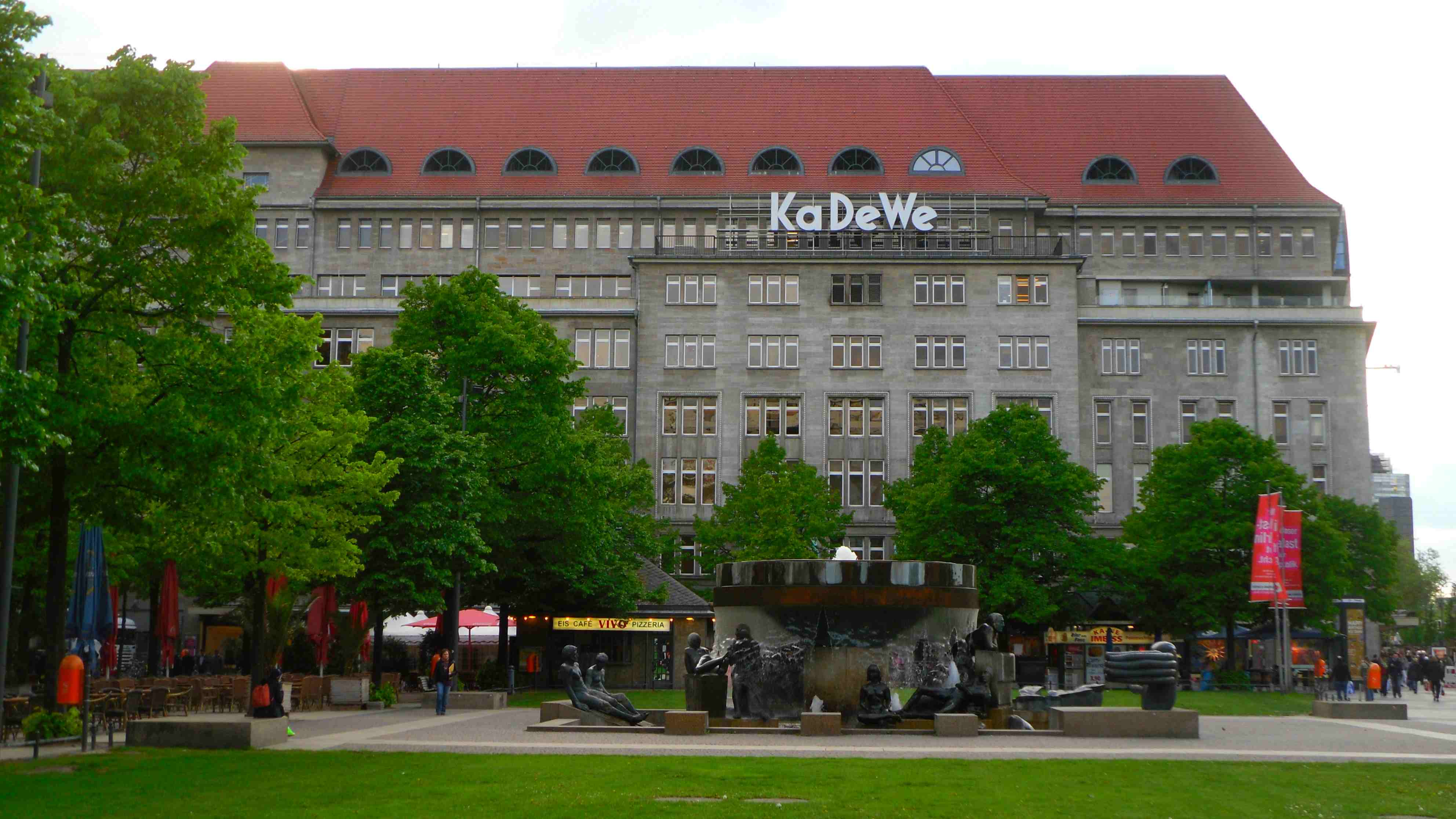
Kaufhaus des Westens (KaDeWe), department store

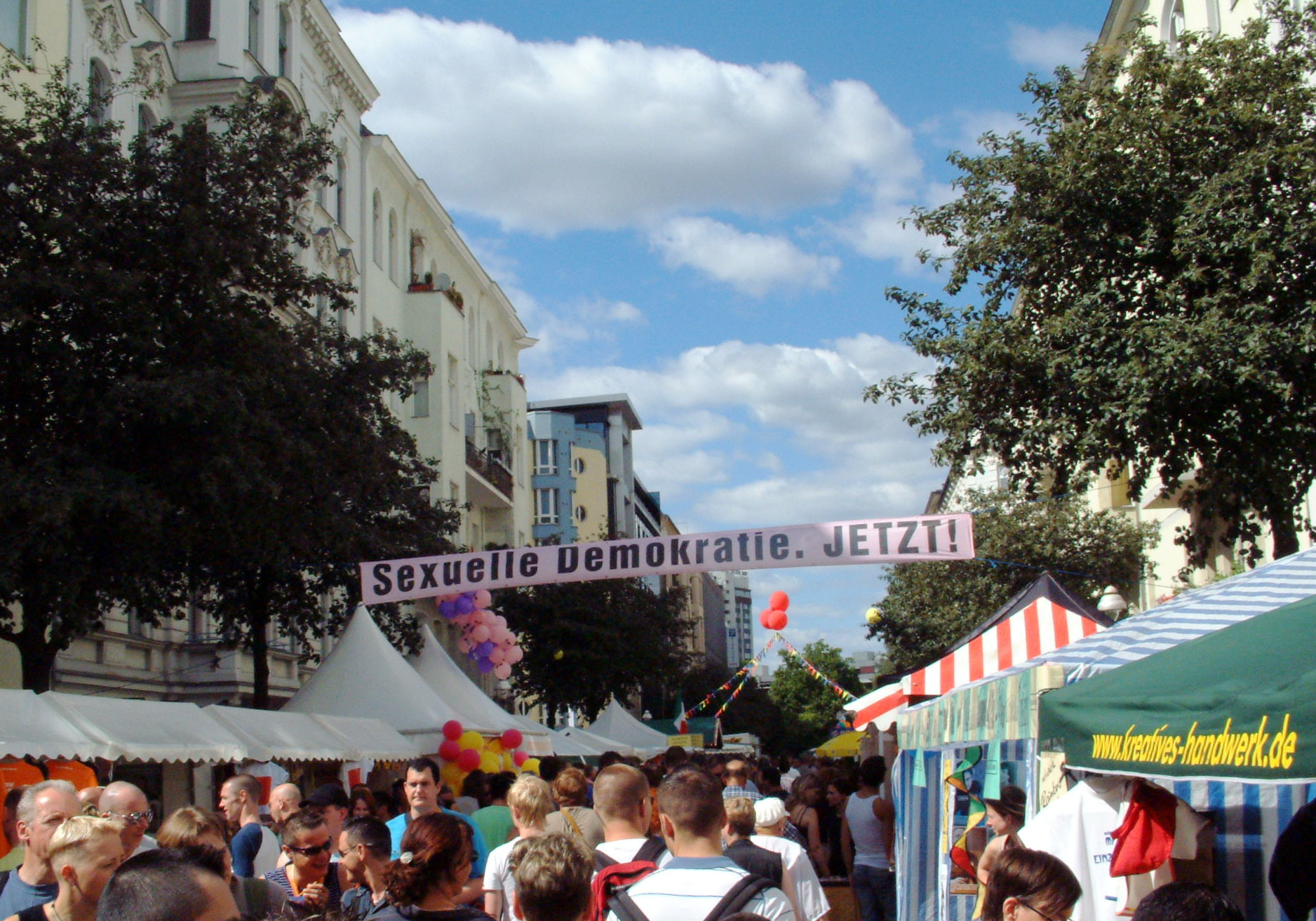
Lesbian and Gay City Festival near Nollendorfplatz

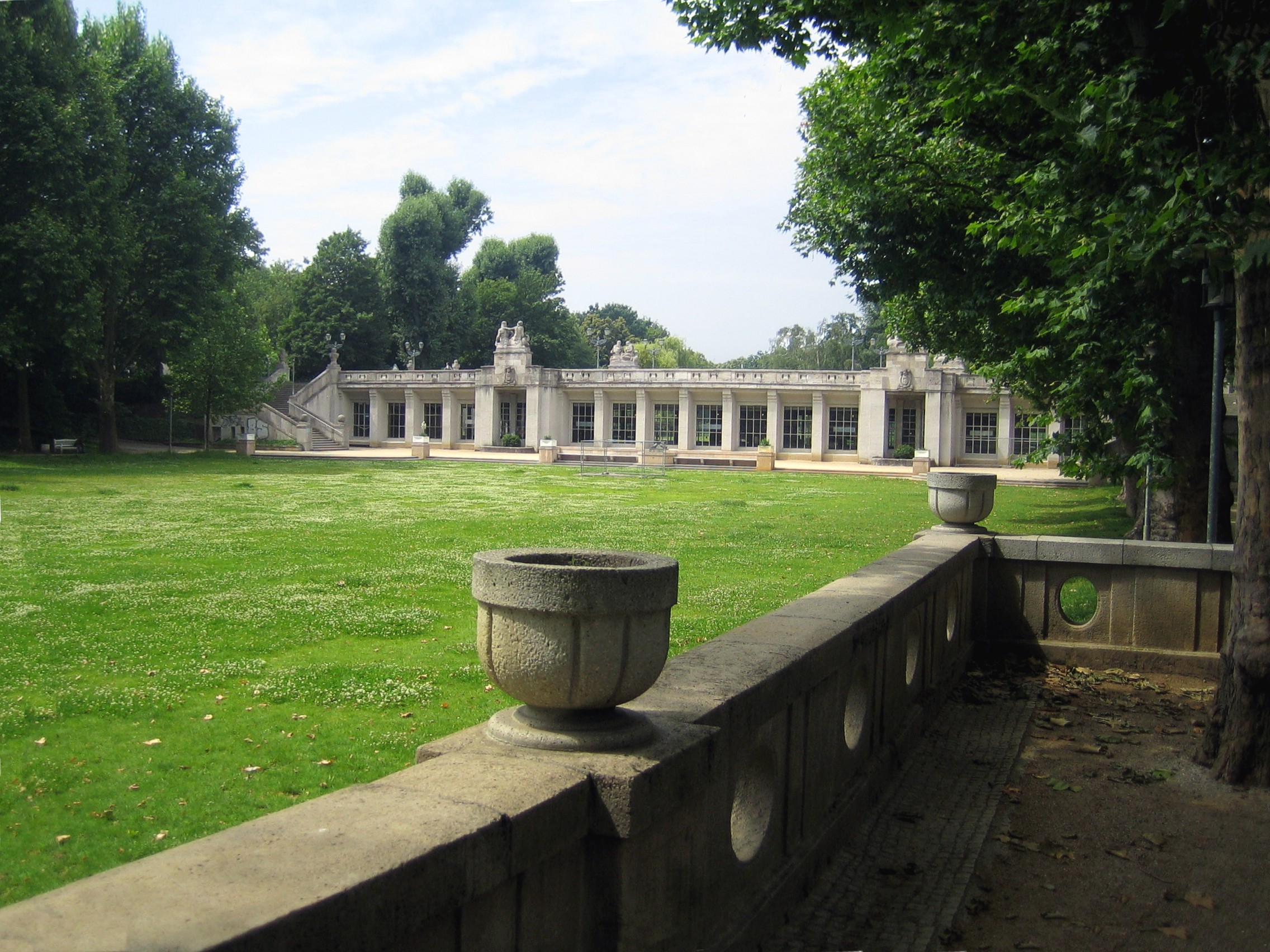
Rudolph Wilde Park

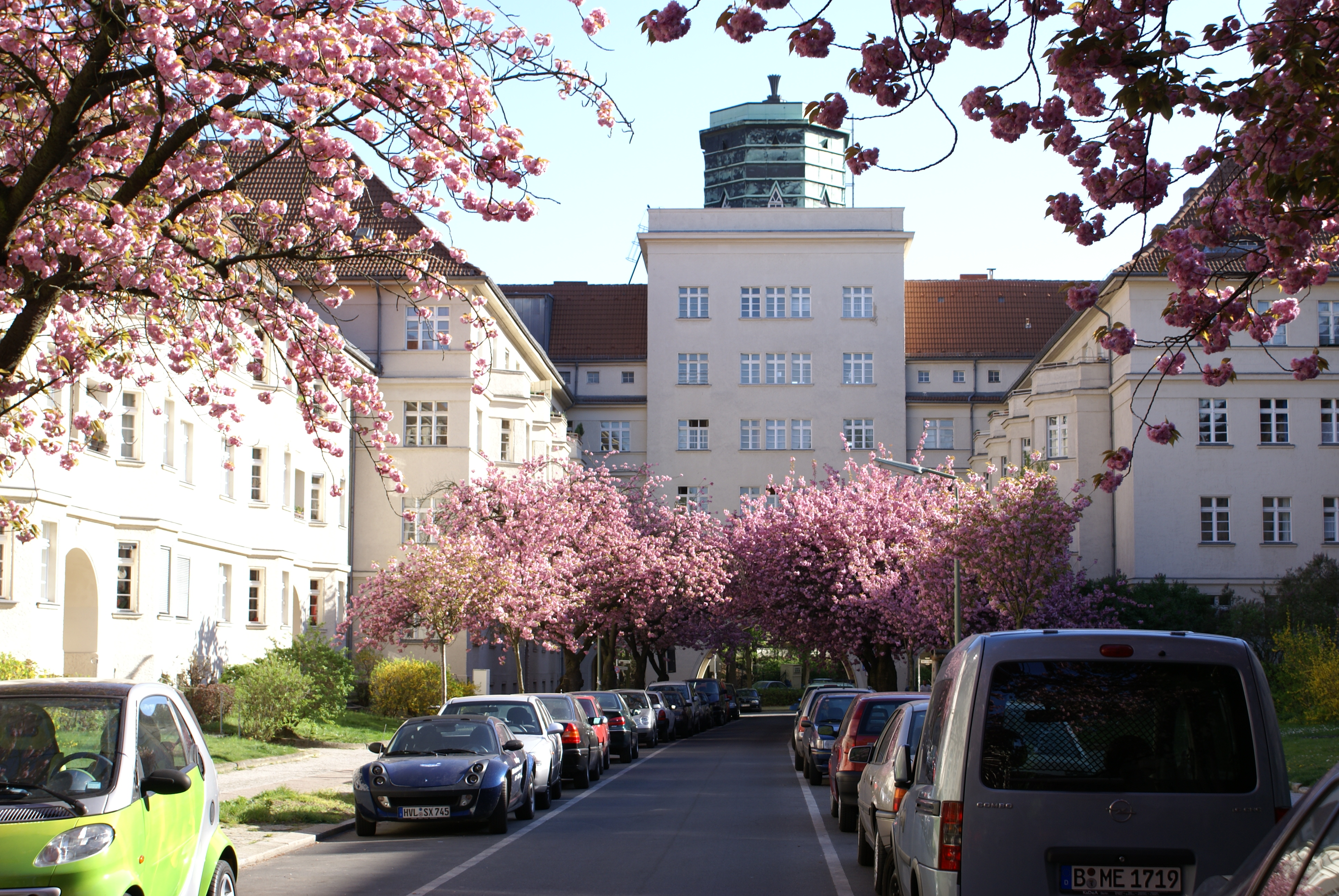
Residential area Ceciliengärten

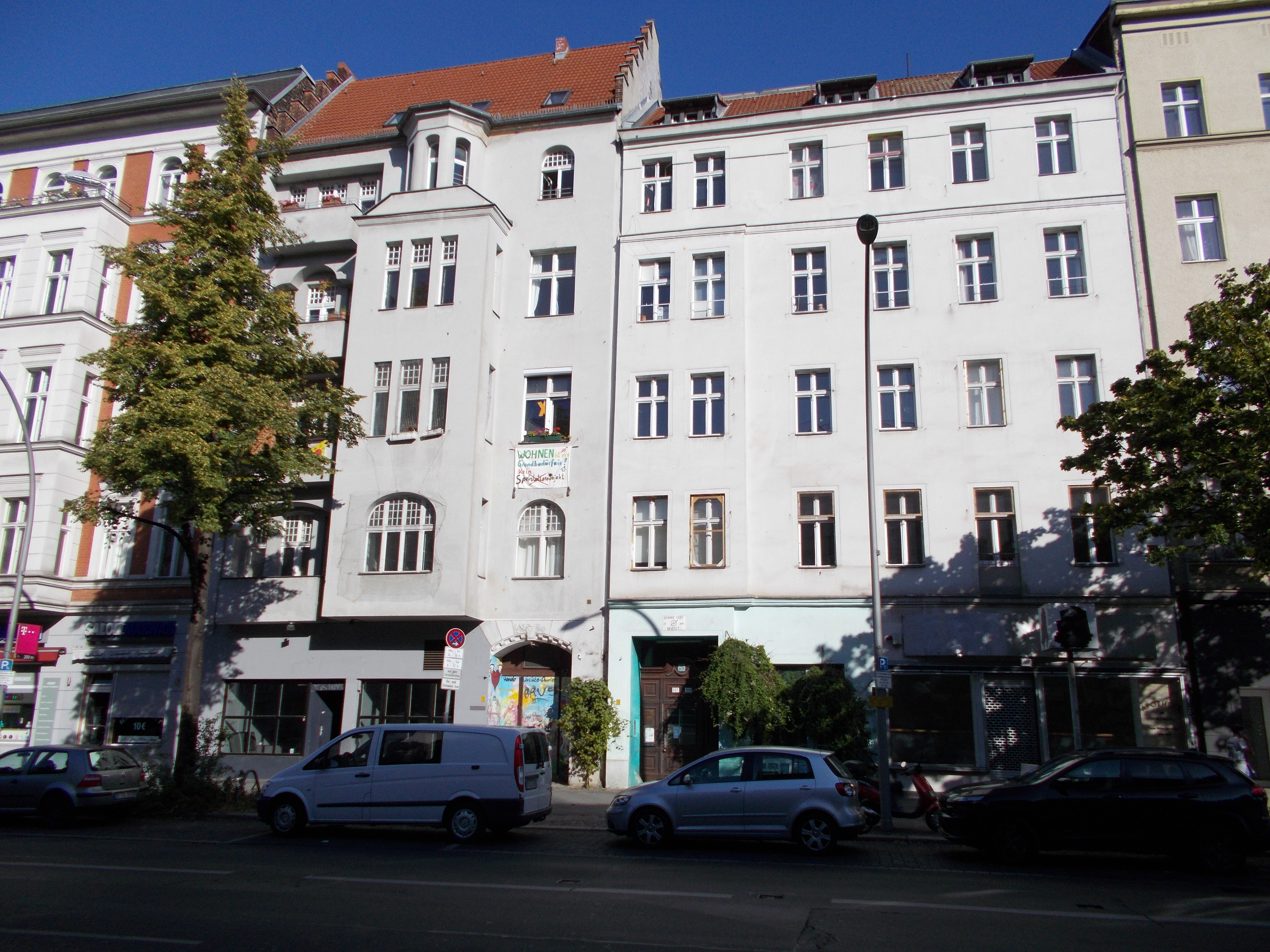
Squatted houses at Potsdamer Strasse

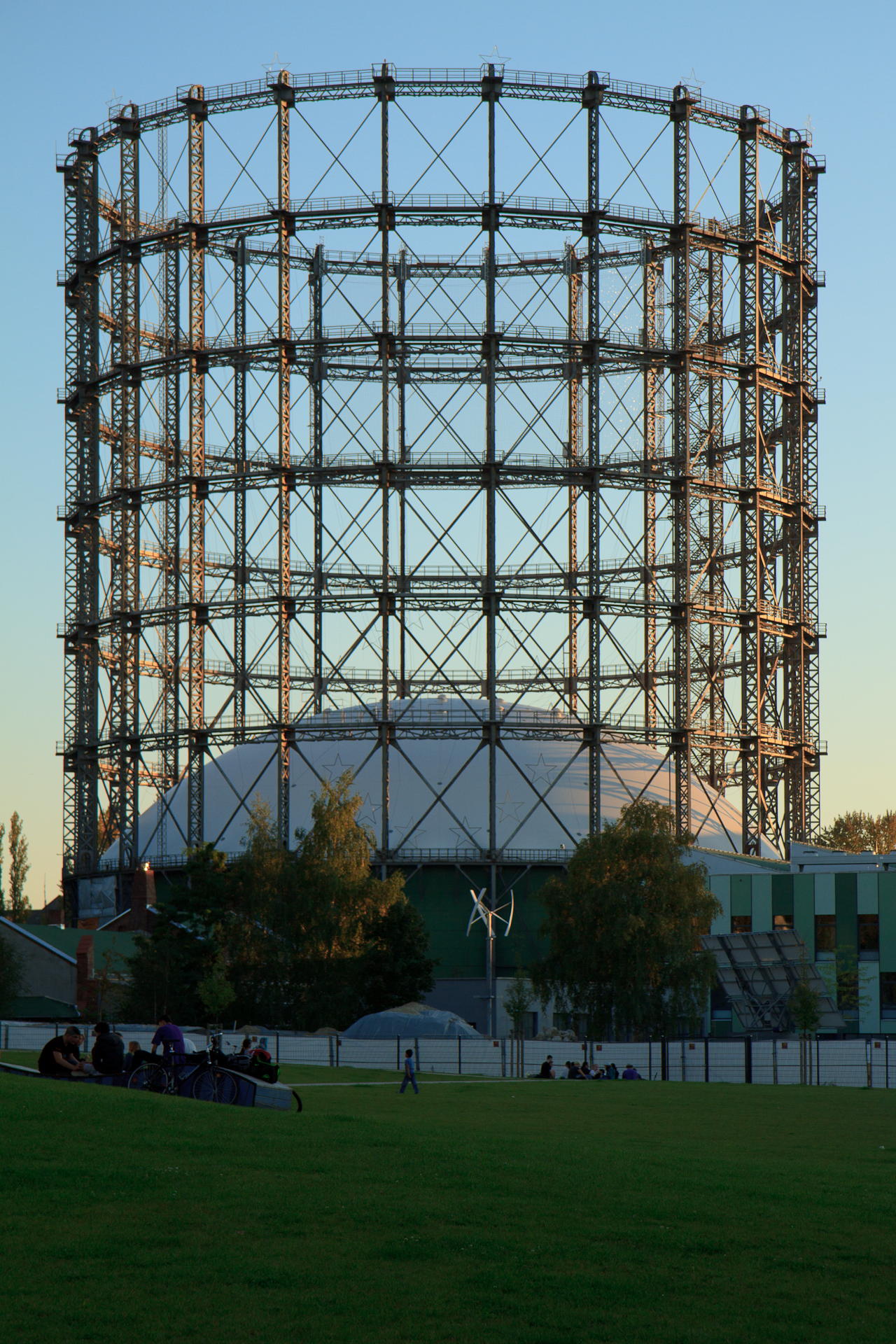
Gasometer, a landmark of Rote Insel, as of 2022 in redevelopment into a building

== Notable people ==
=== Born in Schöneberg ===
- Kitty Kuse, German lesbian activist and economist, born 17 March 1904, died 7 November 1999
- Blixa Bargeld, musician, born 12 January 1959
- Eduard Bernstein, lived 1850-1932, Socialist economist and politician, member of Reichstag
- Marlene Dietrich, actress, born 27 December 1901, Sedanstraße 65 (today: Leberstraße 65), Rote Insel, died 6 May 1992 in Paris; buried in the Städtischer Friedhof III cemetery, Friedenau
- Gisèle Freund, photographer, born 19 December 1908, Bayerisches Viertel, died 31 March 2000 in Paris
- Wilhelm Furtwängler, conductor, born 25 January 1886, Maaßenstraße 1 at Nollendorfplatz, died 30 November 1954 in Ebersteinburg, Baden-Baden
- Alfred Lion, co-founder of the Blue Note jazz record label, born 21 April 1909, Gotenstraße 7, died 2 February 1987 in New York City
- Ernst Hermann Meyer, composer and musicologist, born 8 December 1905, died 8 October 1988 in Berlin
- Helmut Newton, photographer, born 31 October 1920, Innsbrucker Straße 24, died 23 January 2004 in West Hollywood; buried in the Städtischer Friedhof III cemetery, Friedenau
- Jürgen Ohlsen (1917–1994), child actor best-remembered for the role of Heini Völker in Hitlerjunge Quex (Our Flag Leads Us Forward) (1933).
- Christian Ried (born 1979), racing driver
- Nelly Sachs, writer, holder of the 1966 Nobel Prize for Literature, born 10 December 1891, Maaßenstraße 12, died 12 May 1970 in Stockholm
- Margarete Seeler (1909–1996), was a German-born American artist, designer, educator, and author; known for her cloisonné work.
- Willi Stoph, politician, born 9 July 1914, Rote Insel, died 13 April 1999 in Berlin

=== Lived in Schöneberg ===
- Hans Baluschek, painter, Ceciliengärten housing estate, 1929–1933
- August Bebel (1840–1913) Hauptstraße 97
- Gottfried Benn (1886–1956) Bozener Straße 20
- David Bowie (1947–2016) Hauptstraße 155, 1976–1978
- Iggy Pop (born 1947) Hauptstraße 155, 1976–1978
- Ferruccio Busoni (1866–1924) Viktoria-Luise-Platz 11, buried at Städtischer Friedhof III cemetery, Friedenau
- Marlene Dietrich (1901-1992), actress; born and lived with her husband and her family in Schöneberg before they finally left Germany in 1933.
- Albert Einstein (1879–1955) Haberlandstraße 5, 1919-1933
- Hans Fallada (1893–1947) Luitpoldstraße 11
- Sepp Herberger (1897–1977) Bülowstraße
- Hilde Hildebrand (1897–1976) actress, Voßbergstraße 2, 1930–1932
- Christopher Isherwood (1904–1986) Nollendorfstraße 17, 1930–1932
- Klaus Kinski (1926–1991), actor, Wartburgstraße 3, 1930–1944
- Hildegard Knef (1925–2002), actress, Sedanstraße 68
- Else Lasker-Schüler (1869–1945) poet, Motzstraße 7
- Friedrich Luft (1911–1990) theater critic, author and broadcaster, Maienstraße 4
- Alice Michaelis (1875–1943) painter and educator, Speyerer Straße 2
- Friedrich Naumann (1860–1919) Naumannstraße
- Annemarie Renger (1919–2008) President of the Bundestag, Bülowstraße
- Ruth Margarete Roellig (1878–1969) writer
- Jean Ross (1911–1973) Nollendorfstraße 17, 1930–1932
- Rudolf Steiner and Marie Steiner-von Sivers, Motzstraße 30, 1903–1923
- Claire Waldoff, singer, (1884–1957) Bamberger Straße, Starnberger Straße 2, Landshuter Straße 14, Regensburger Straße 33 1919–1933, Haberlandstraße 7
- Billy Wilder (1906–2002) Viktoria-Luise-Platz 11, 1927–1928
- Paul Zech (1881–1946), writer, Naumannstraße 78
Stolperstein and plaques in Schöneberg

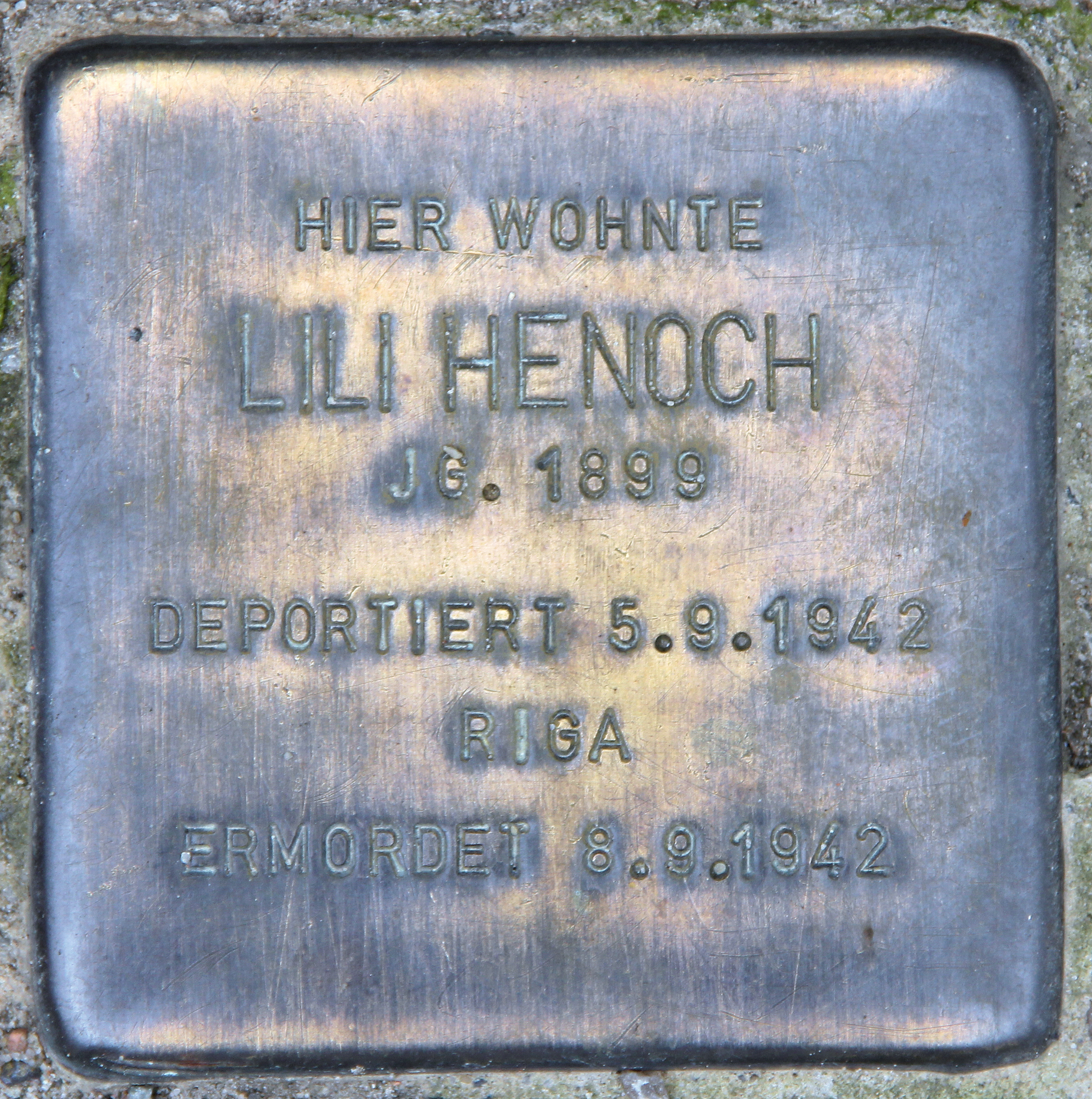
Stolperstein of Lilli Henoch, embedded at Treuchtlinger Straße 5

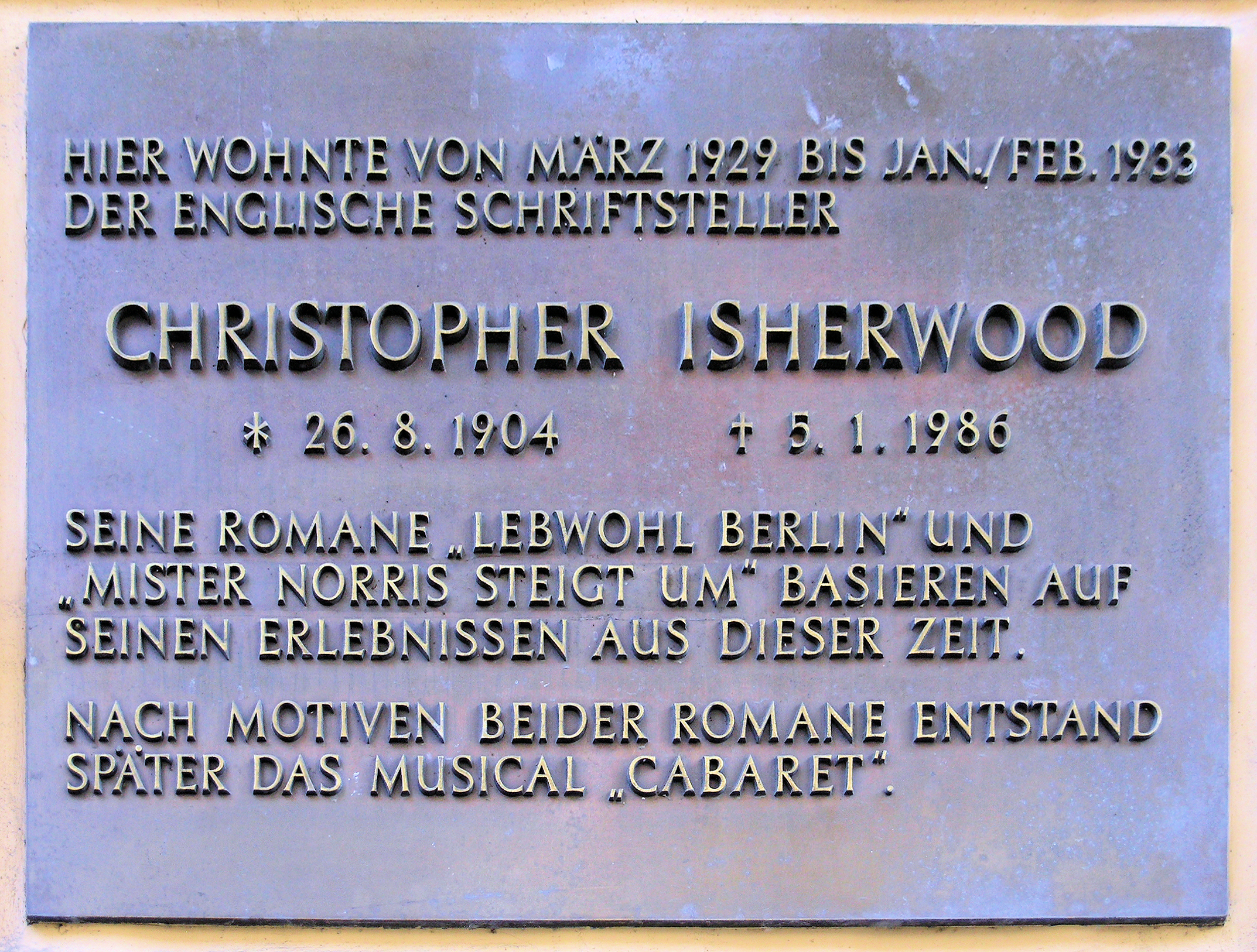
Plaque at Nollendorfstraße 17 about Christopher Isherwood
