= Margarete Seeler =

German-born enamel artist (1909–1996)

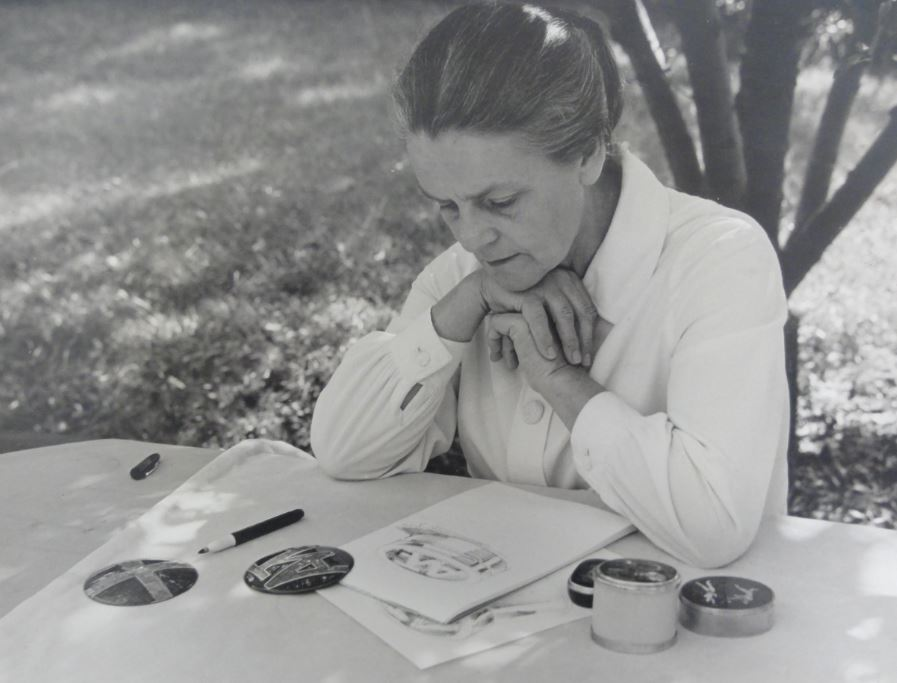
- Born: 1909; Berlin, German Empire
- Died: 1996 (aged 86–87); Kennebunkport, Maine, U.S.
- Education: United State Schools for Free and Applied Arts
- Occupation(s): Artist, designer, educator, author
- Known for: Cloisonné, grisaille, plique-à-jour
- Spouse: Herbert Zeitner (m. 1938–1942; divorced)
- Children: 2
- Awards: American Craft Council (1993)

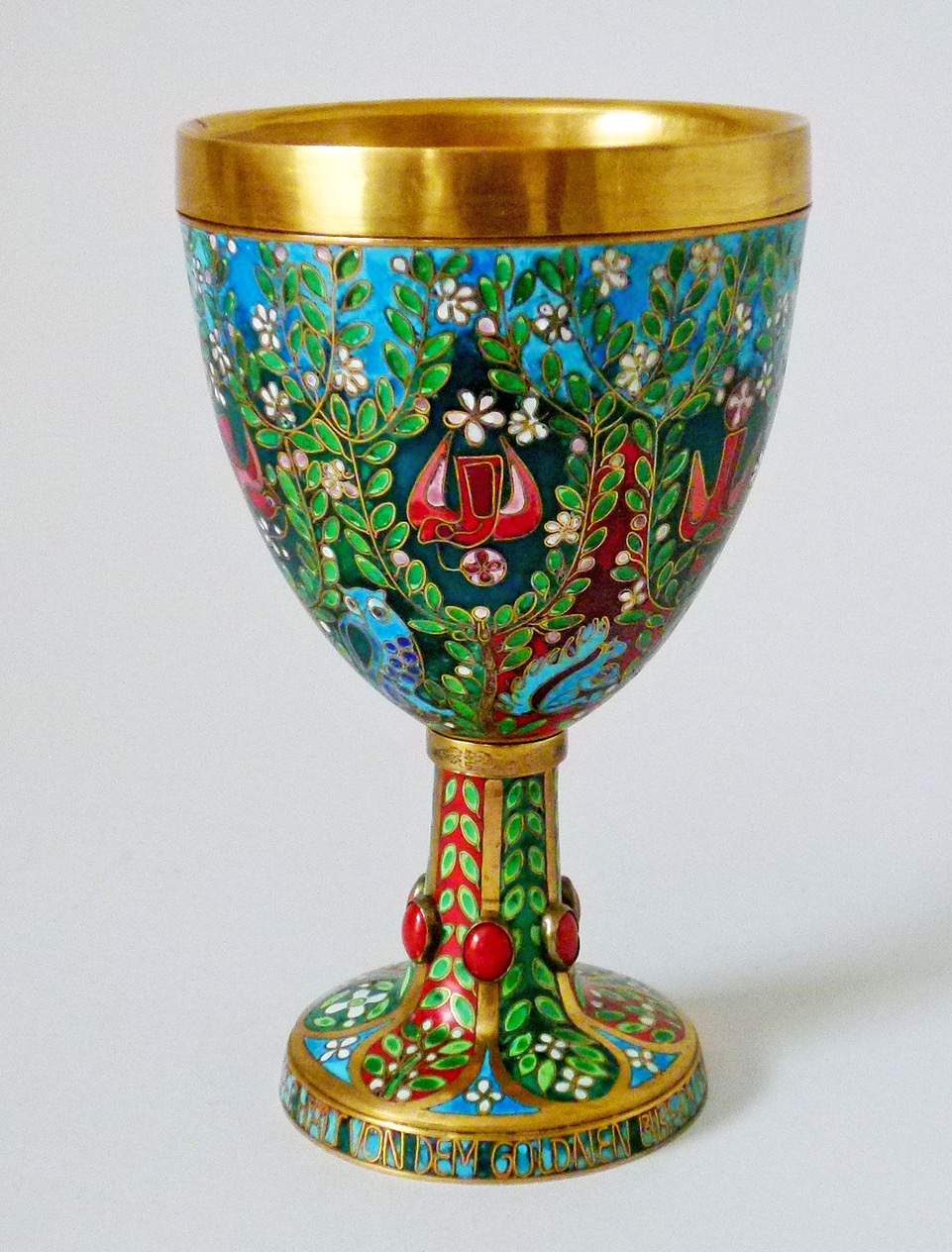
Seeler's "Family Cup", ca. 1974

Margarete Seeler (1909–1996) was a German-born American artist, designer, educator, and author. She was known for work as a goldsmith, her enamelwork, graphic design, and her paintings. She was one of the best known enamelers in the United States, specifically for her cloisonné work. She published two books on enameling, The Art of Enameling (1969) and Enamel Medium for Fine Art (1997). Seeler was elected as a Fellow of the American Craft Council in 1993.

== Biography ==
Margarete Seeler was born in 1909 in the Schöneberg neighborhood of Berlin, German Empire.

At age 16, she started to study at the United States Schools for Free and Applied Arts (German: Vereinigte Staatsschulen für freie und angewandte Kunst), primarily painting and drawing. Her professors included Bruno Paul, and Wilhelm Tank.

She lived in Italy in 1934, for one year, where she took commissioned portrait work. Seeler was able to save enough to travel around the world for the next two years. She was married from 1938 until 1942 to her former professor, silversmith Herbert Zeitner, and together they had two children.

After World War II, Seeler was able to leave East Germany and move to West Germany. In 1958, she moved to the United States, to teach at The Putney School. From 1965 to 1985, she taught at the University of Connecticut. Notable students of Seeler include Mariluisa Barz and Gordon Merrick.

Seeler often worked with pewterer Frances Felten, providing the enamel work on the top of her pewter. Seeler's work is included in public museum collections including the Museum of Fine Arts, Boston, the National Galleries of Scotland, among others.

== Publications ==
- Seeler, Margaret (1969). The Art of Enameling: How to Shape Precious Metal and Decorate it with Cloisonné, Champlevé, Plique-à-jour, Mercury Gilding and Other Fine Techniques. New York City, NY: Van Nostrand Reinhold Company. ISBN 9780442281649.
- Seeler, Margarete (1996). Enamel, Medium for Fine Art. Pittsburgh, Pennsylvania: Dorrance Publishing Co. ISBN 9780805939422.
