= Rudolph Wilde Park =

City park in Berlin, Germany

Rudolph-Wilde-Park
- Schöneberg City Park
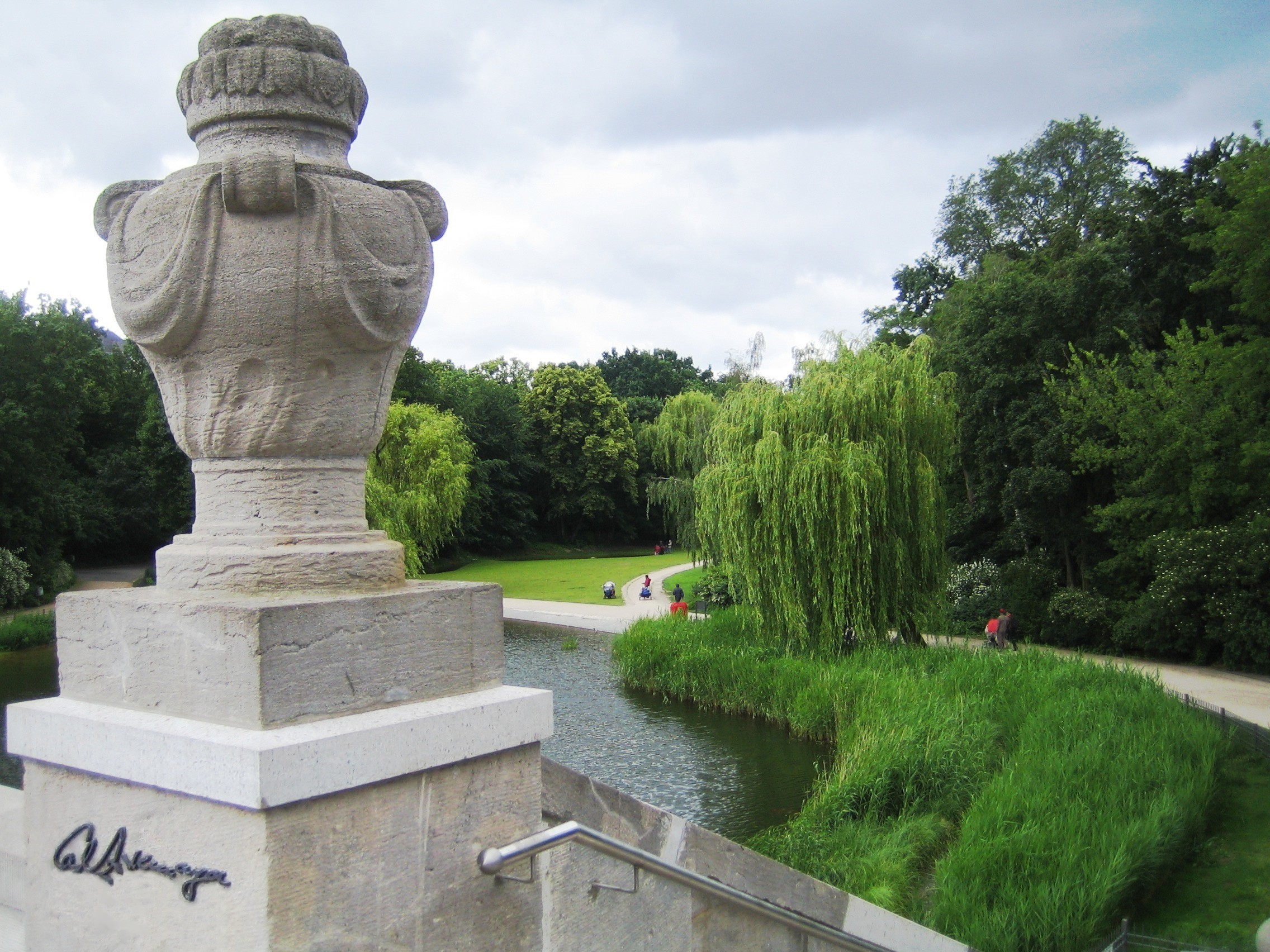
- View from the Carl Zuckmayer Bridge towards the western part of the park
- Interactive map of Rudolph-Wilde-Park
- Type: Park in Berlin
- Location: Berlin
- Nearest city: Schöneberg
- Coordinates: 52°29′1″N 130°20′32″E

Rudolph Wilde Park (formerly Stadtpark Schöneberg) is located in the Schöneberg district of Berlin. This public park and recreation area is named after the first mayor, Rudolph Wilde, on whose initiative the town hall of the then-independent town of Schöneberg was built between 1911 and 1914.

The long, narrow park covers an area of 6.6 hectares and extends approximately 650 meters along Martin Luther Street (Berlin), from the town hall westward to the district boundary at Volkspark Wilmersdorf on Kufsteiner Straße. Tree-lined walking paths, playgrounds, lawns, the listed Carl Zuckmayer Bridge with the above-ground Rathaus Schöneberg underground station, and the Hirschbrunnen fountain in the spa-like eastern section characterise this popular park.

== Glacial drainage channel ==
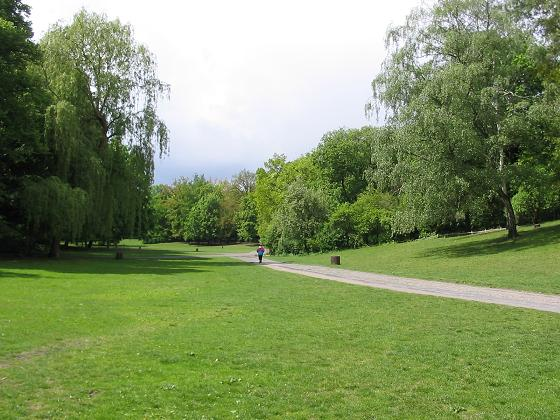
Gently rolling lawns

Geologically, Rudolph Wilde Park is situated in a side arm of the glacial channel of the Grunewald chain of lakes. The area was part of a marshy fen formed at the end of the last Ice Age, originally flowing from Nollendorfplatz along the Teltow ridge to the Lietzensee lake. An information board on-site explains:

Due to sedimentation, this trench became increasingly shallow and eventually split into a chain of small lakes and ponds. The so-called Schwarze Graben (Black Ditch), also known as the Haupt-Graben (Main Ditch) or Fauler Graben (Rotten Ditch) by villagers, flowed through this trench. Sewage from Schöneberg was discharged into it until it was filled in during 1887.

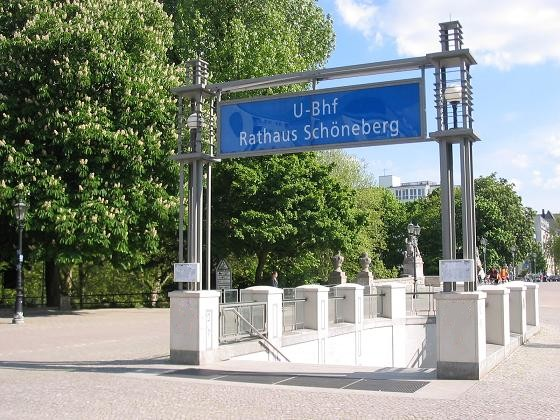
Carl Zuckmayer Bridge with underground entrance

This remaining drainage channel began south of the former mill hill, where the town hall was built. The duck pond in front of the Rathaus Schöneberg underground station is now the last remaining eastern body of water in the lowlands, which stretch westward as an inner-city green belt approximately 2.5 kilometres long and 150 meters wide. This green belt passes through the neighbouring Volkspark Wilmersdorf and the Fennsee lake to the Stadtring ring road. After being interrupted by sports fields and built-up areas, the secondary channel continues at the Hubertussee and meets the Herthasee at the Koenigssee, where it intersects the Grunewaldrinne at a right angle.

== The park today ==
=== General description ===
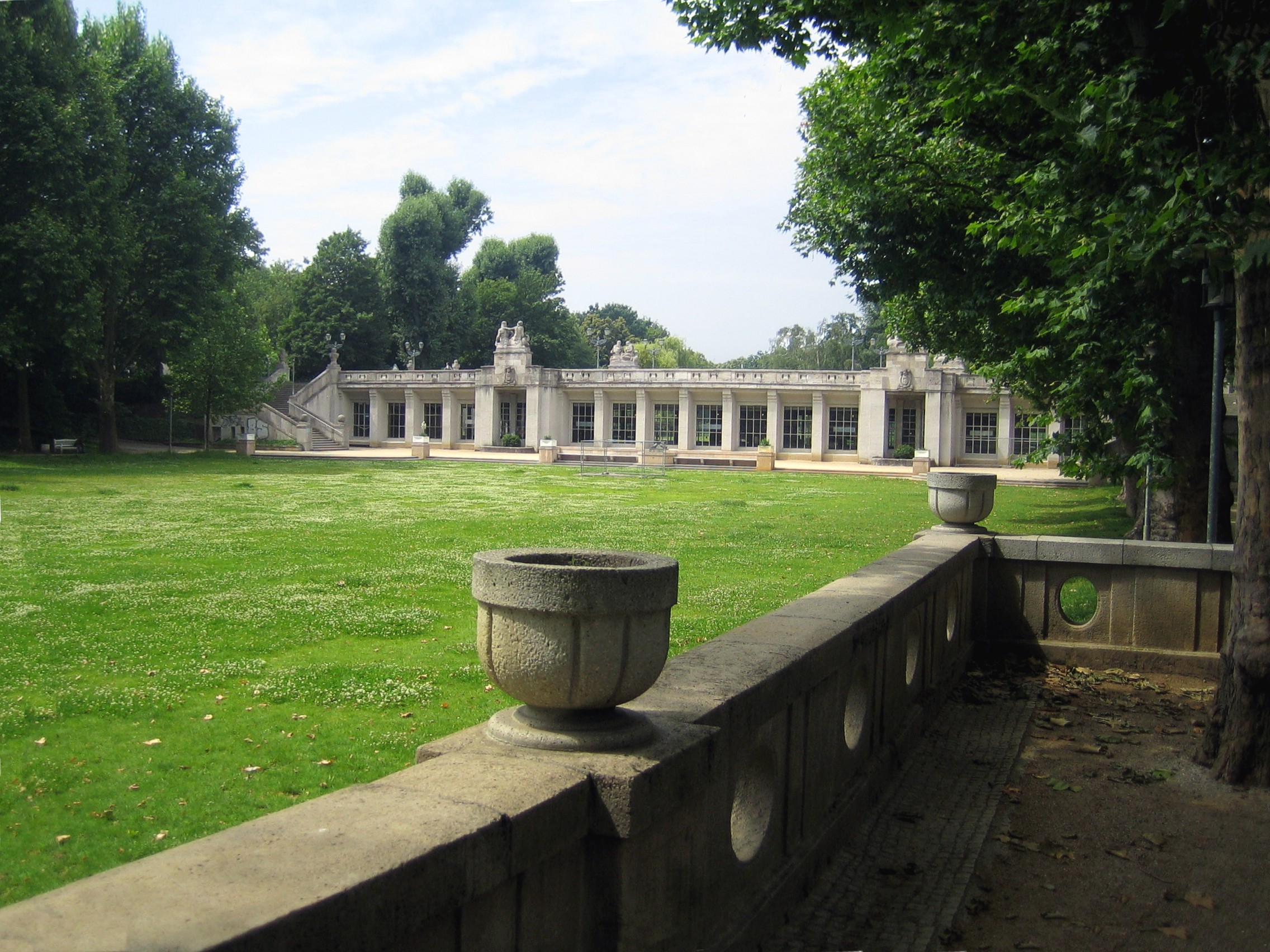
Eastern part, view of the bridge with the underground station below

The gently rolling lawns in the western part and the tree-lined paths on the elevated edge, popular with joggers, still reflect the channels of the meltwater. The valley character of the park is particularly evident at the Rathaus Schöneberg underground station.

=== Carl Zuckmayer Bridge ===
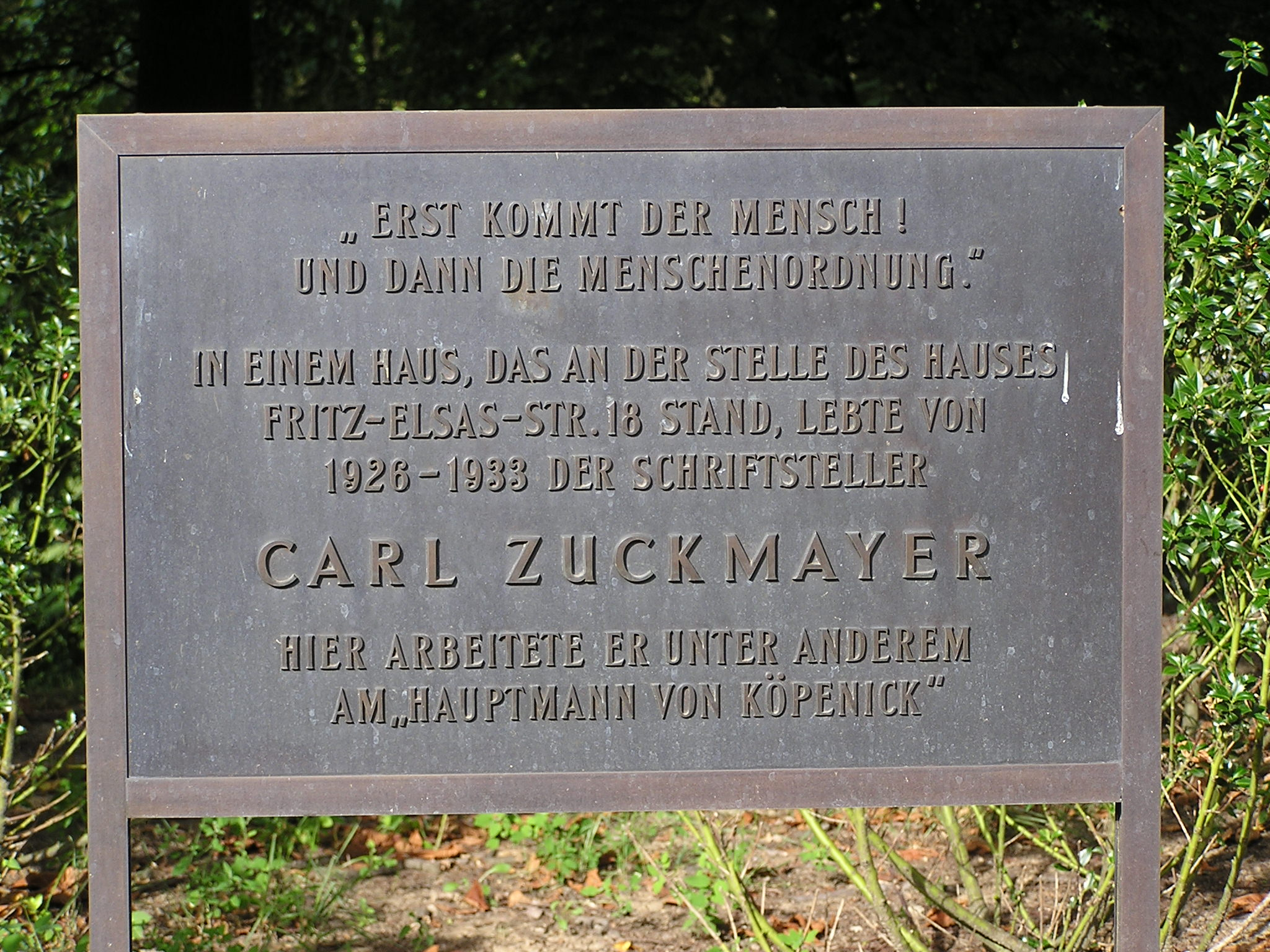
Memorial plaque for Carl Zuckmayer at Fritz-Elsas-Straße 18

The U4 underground line divides the park into eastern and western sections. Engineers utilised the entire width of the park to construct the underground station, which features two glass sides opening onto the park and is one of Berlin's most beautiful underground stations. The underground line runs beneath the park's drainage channel, emerges at the surface within the park, and dives back underground on the other side. Despite its open location, the station is not at ground level and must be accessed via stairs, like other underground stations. The station's roof is formed by the historic Carl Zuckmayer Bridge, adorned with stone figures and vases on an ornate balustrade, from which wide steps lead down to the two parts of the park. The bridge connects the northern and southern parts of Innsbrucker Straße across the park but is closed to through traffic, reserved for pedestrians and cyclists. It is named after the writer Carl Zuckmayer, who worked as a dramaturge at the Deutsches Theatre in Berlin in 1924 alongside Bertolt Brecht and lived at the southern end of the bridge.

Between 1995 and 2005, the bridge and underground station underwent extensive renovation, complicated by the marshy, swampy ground. For example, the oak piles beneath the stairways were found to be rotting and too short. As a replacement, 21-meter-long concrete piles were driven deep into the ground. The renovation was necessary because the area in front of the station had subsided by approximately 60 centimetres, endangering the Hirschbrunnen fountain and the Milchhäuschen milk house in the eastern part of the park.

=== Duck pond and weeping willows ===
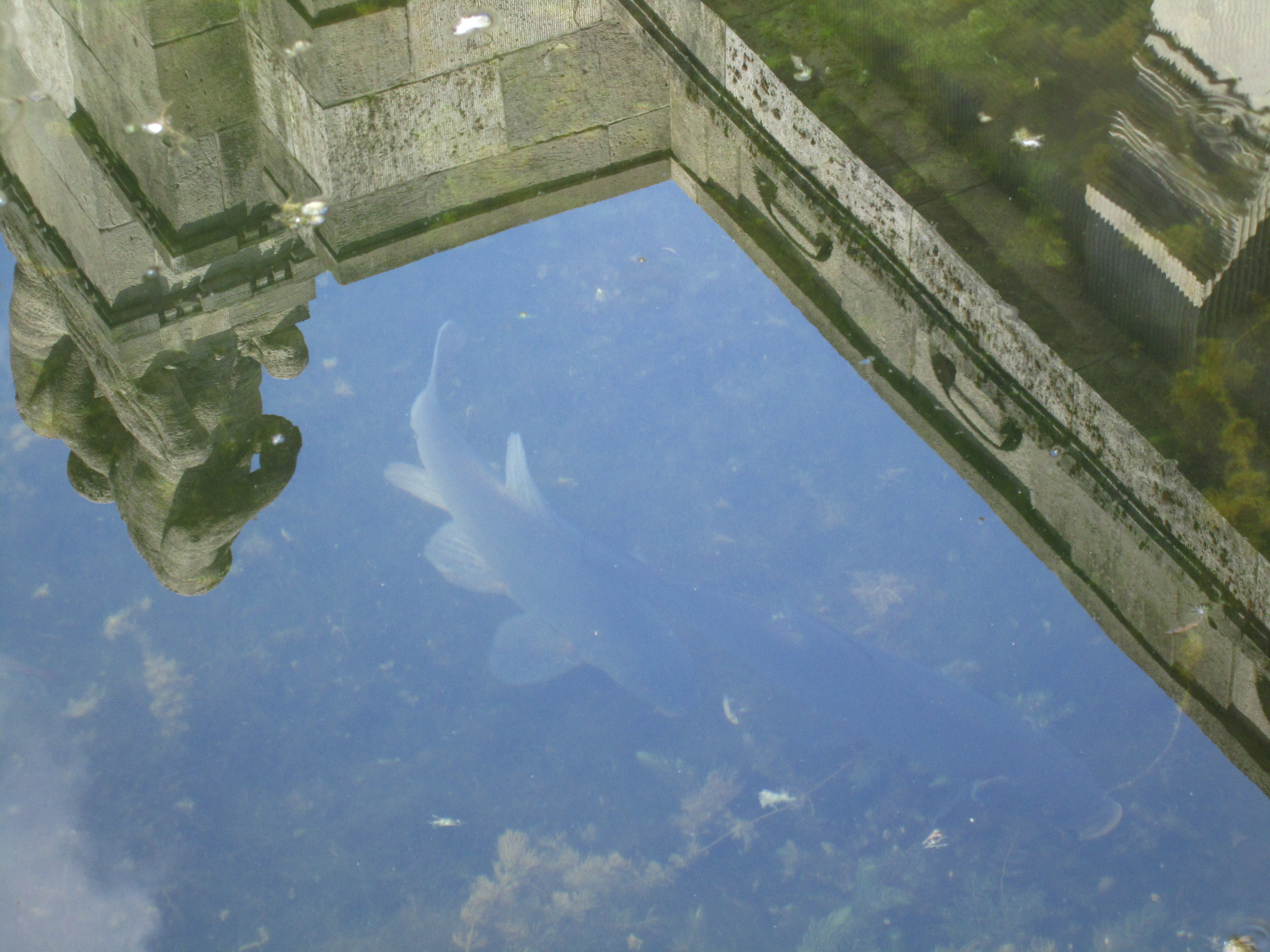
Fish and algae in the duck pond

To the west, directly in front of the bridge and the glass enclosure of the underground station, lies a small duck pond, which, like the adjacent sunbathing lawn, has been raised to a new level. While the eastern part of the park was fully renovated by 2001, work on the duck pond took longer and was completed in October 2005 after a decade of construction. The pond regained its original function as a "mirroring" link between the architecture of the station and the landscape garden, designed in the style of an orangery. According to an on-site information sheet, the district office planned:

The duck pond in Rudolph Wilde Park, a listed garden ensemble, is to be renovated. Construction work will begin in July 2005. As a prerequisite for the pond renovation, trees surrounding the pond must be cleared. The trees on the banks do not correspond to the original layout but were planted later or have grown from tolerated wild growth. They impair the water surface's effect as a mirror of the underground station in the style of an orangery and conflict with the original low-lying vegetation on the banks. Another reason for the clearing is the introduction of organic materials, such as leaves, which severely impair water quality. The rear wall of the pond will also be reworked. The planned construction work will be completed in October 2005.

In April 2005, fifteen trees around the duck pond were felled, surprising local residents. Two weeping willows with birds' nests, the subject of a fierce dispute, remained standing temporarily. While Building Councillor Gerhard Lawrentz (CDU) and the monument protection authority advocated felling the trees for the reasons described, District Mayor Ekkehard Band (SPD) supported their preservation. Since the redevelopment measures and the "clear-cutting at the duck pond" (Berliner Morgenpost, 23 April 2005) were financed by ecological compensation measures, the Bund für Umwelt und Naturschutz Berlin (BUND) considered legal action against the district office for misuse of funds. The park initiative "Save the Weeping Willows" put up a poster on a willow tree with the slogan "This tree will stay." According to the Berliner Morgenpost on 26 April 2005, Ingrid Winkler from the initiative protested against "the cynical justification for felling given by the monument authority, which claimed that the trees detracted from the effect of the architectural monument that is the underground station in the water mirror of the pond."

By the end of 2005, construction work on the duck pond was completed. A natural clay sealant replaced the pond's previous asphalt basin. Water is now supplied from a deep well at the southern end of the underground station. Fresh water and pond water extracted from the banks can be enriched with oxygen via circulation pumps. Together with a biological filter system and a marshy reed belt on the north bank, these measures aim to keep nutrient concentrations in the pond within limits, preventing algae growth.

=== Spa garden character in the eastern part ===
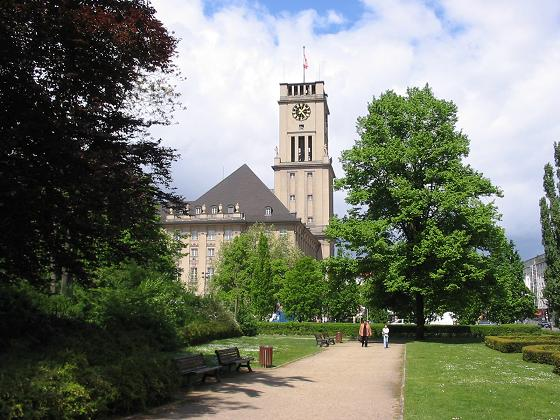
Park begins at Schöneberg Town Hall

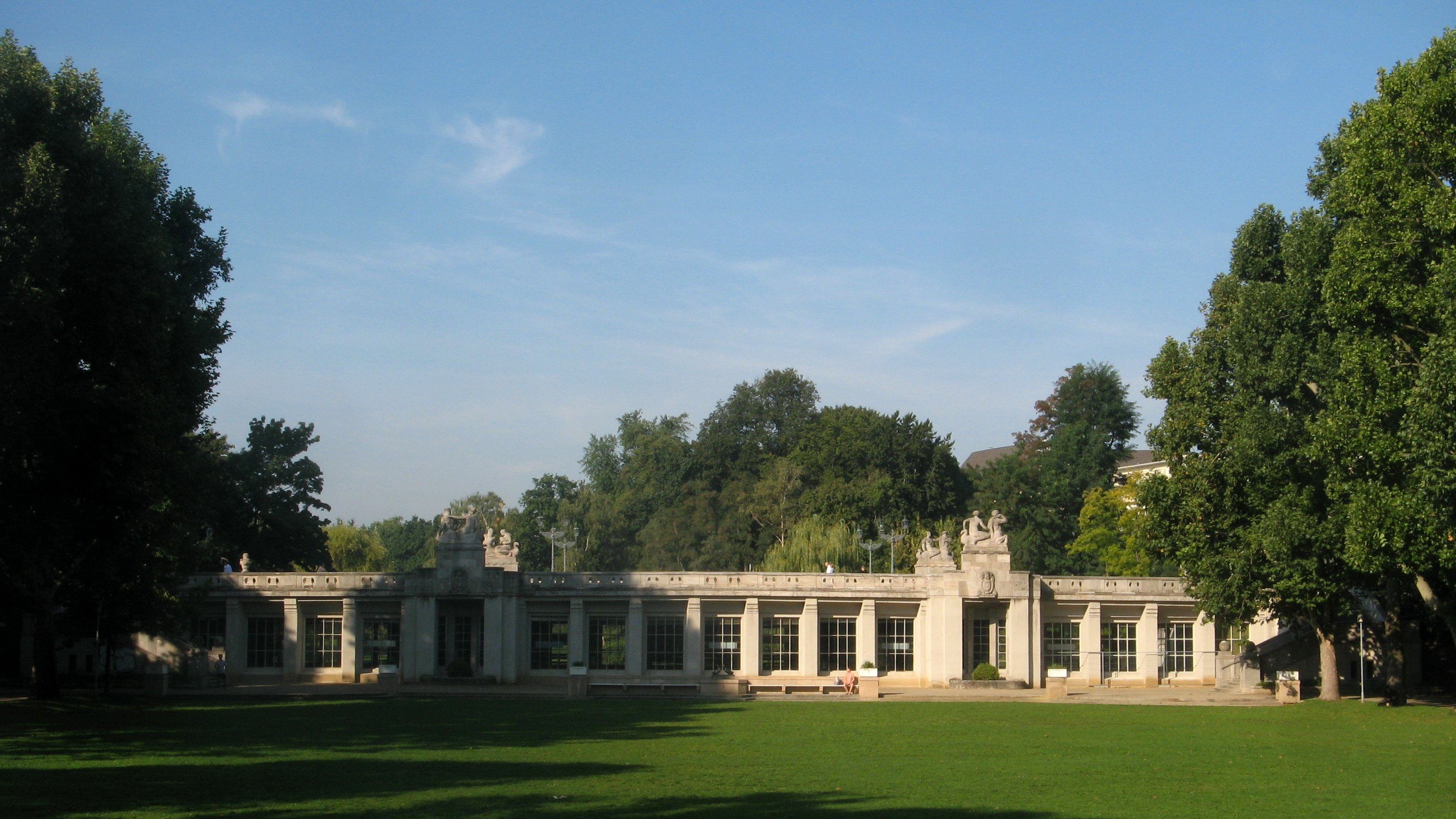
Eastern part of the park

The renovation of the smaller eastern section, comprising roughly a third of the total area, was completed in 2001. This section, starting directly at Schöneberg Town Hall, is considered the "architectural" or "geometric" section, with a representative spa garden character.

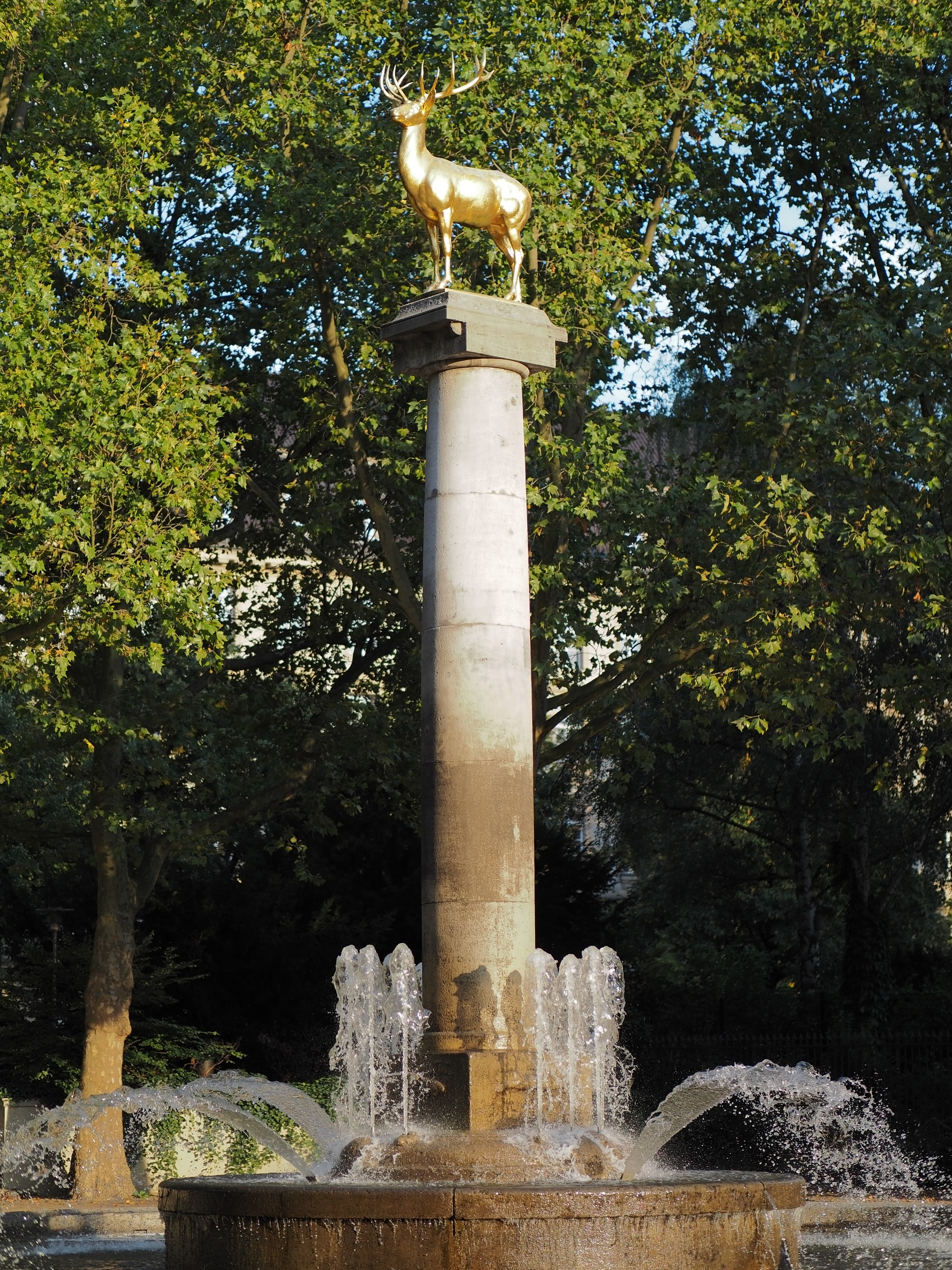
Deer fountain

A wide staircase leads from a historic, renovated milk house to a large fountain, at the centre of which stands an 8.8-meter-high column crowned by a golden stag, the coat of arms of Schöneberg, created by sculptor August Gaul. A beer garden was established in the milk house in 2001.

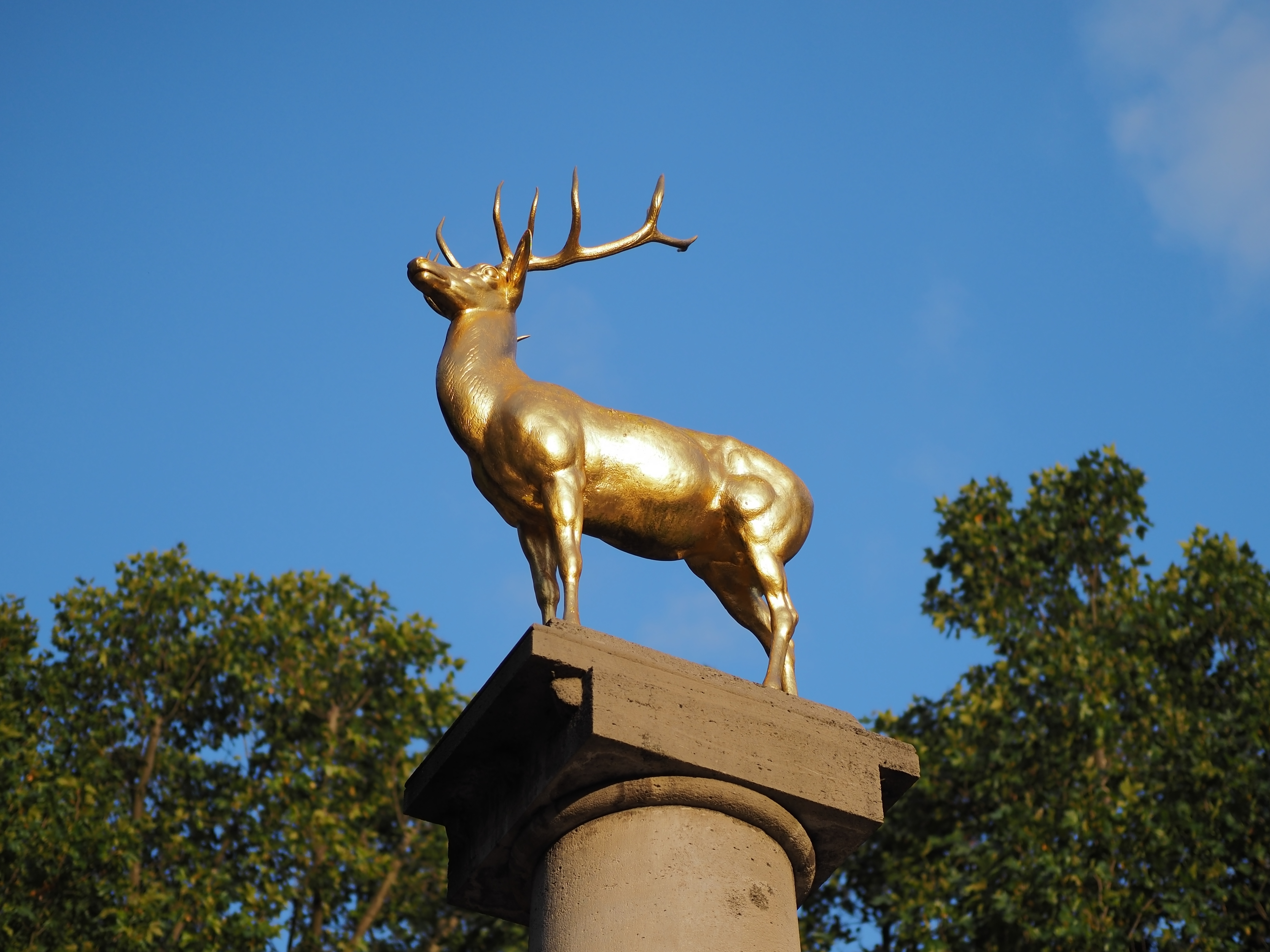
Golden Stag

A wide parapet forms a semicircle around a lawn lined with tree-lined paths, stretching to the Carl Zuckmayer Bridge. This lawn hosted a public television broadcast in 1951. Numerous benches and, in summer, a beer garden at the Milchhäuschen invite visitors to linger.

In addition to stabilising the milk house and fountain on the marshy ground, the redevelopment included extensive replanting and the creation of flower beds. The total cost of redeveloping this approximately 200-meter-long section was around five million euros. The immediate station area was the responsibility of its owner, the BVG.

== History of the park's foundation ==
=== Naming ===
Around 1900, city planning officer Friedrich Gerlach drew up a development plan for Schöneberg that included a park in the approximately 7.5-hectare Talfenn valley, extending westward to the former Wilmersdorfer See, located between today's Bundesallee and Uhlandstraße, which was filled in during 1915. The Volkspark Wilmersdorf was thus called "Seepark" for a long time, while the Schöneberg section was originally laid out as "Stadtpark Schöneberg."

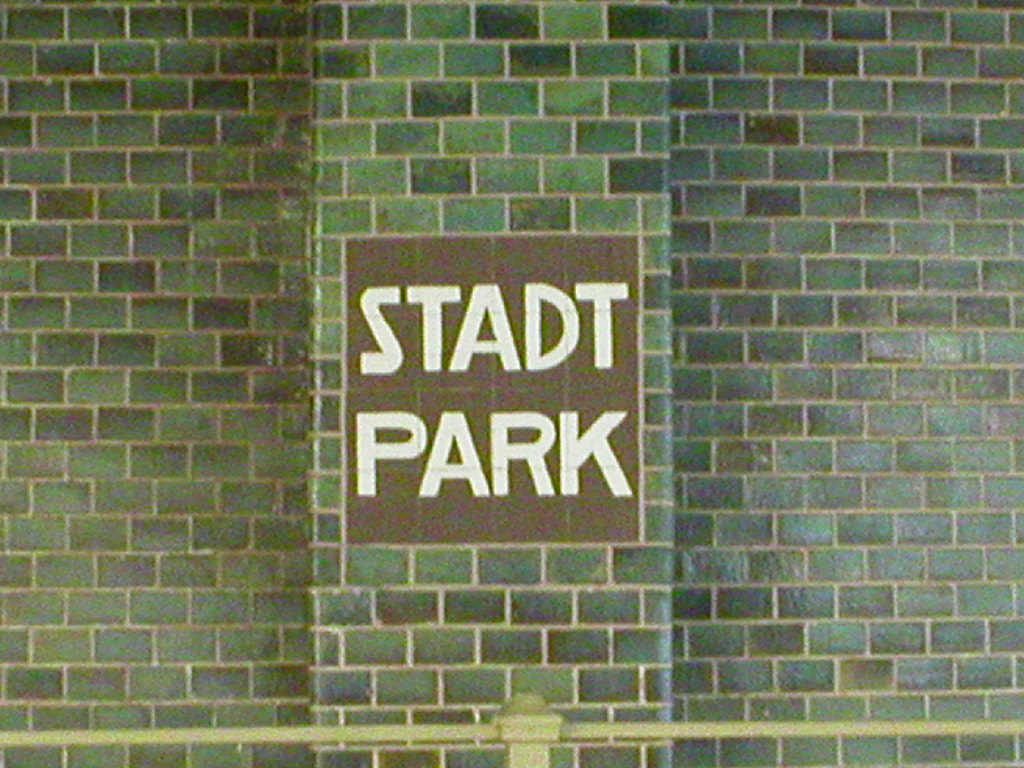
Old station name

The underground station also bore the name Stadtpark. It was renamed Rudolph Wilde Park three days after Kennedy's assassination, in honour of his famous speech on the town hall forecourt on 26 June 1963, with the declaration I am a Berliner. On 25 November 1963, the square was renamed John-F.-Kennedy-Platz, previously known as Rudolph-Wilde-Platz.

=== Planning and construction data ===
The park's design emerged from a national competition held in 1906, with urban planning officer Friedrich Gerlach responsible for implementation. The winner was landscape architect Otto Kruepper, but Gerlach developed a combination of various entries, closest to the second-prize winner, Fritz Encke. The division of Schöneberg Park into a scenic western part and a representative eastern part, emphasising tranquillity and nature observation, dates back to these plans. Playgrounds were integrated inconspicuously, as play and sport were initially excluded. Landscape architects planted around 500 trees up to 20 meters high.

The park's layout posed challenges due to a swamp up to 30 meters deep, which required draining and filling with sand. All buildings were erected on oak piles. Work, coordinated with the underground railway construction, occurred between 1910 and 1912, using approximately 850,000 m³ of excavated material from railway shafts to fill the fen. An information board recounts a Schöneberg resident's childhood memory:

We loved visiting the construction site where the underground railway was to cross the desolate terrain of the former 'Black Ditch.' Here, light railways transported masses of earth into the marshy ground, where the ground swayed and shifted and where no one had ever been able to build a house. Until then, we children had played there to our hearts' content. But now, every evening, high sand walls rose up as the visible result of a day's work. The next morning, however, they had been swallowed up. After some time, the marshy subsoil was saturated with earth and had settled. Before us now lay a desolate expanse of sand.

Up to 500 workers were involved daily. The landscape was largely completed for the underground's opening in 1910, with the deer fountain and steps to the town hall added in 1912.

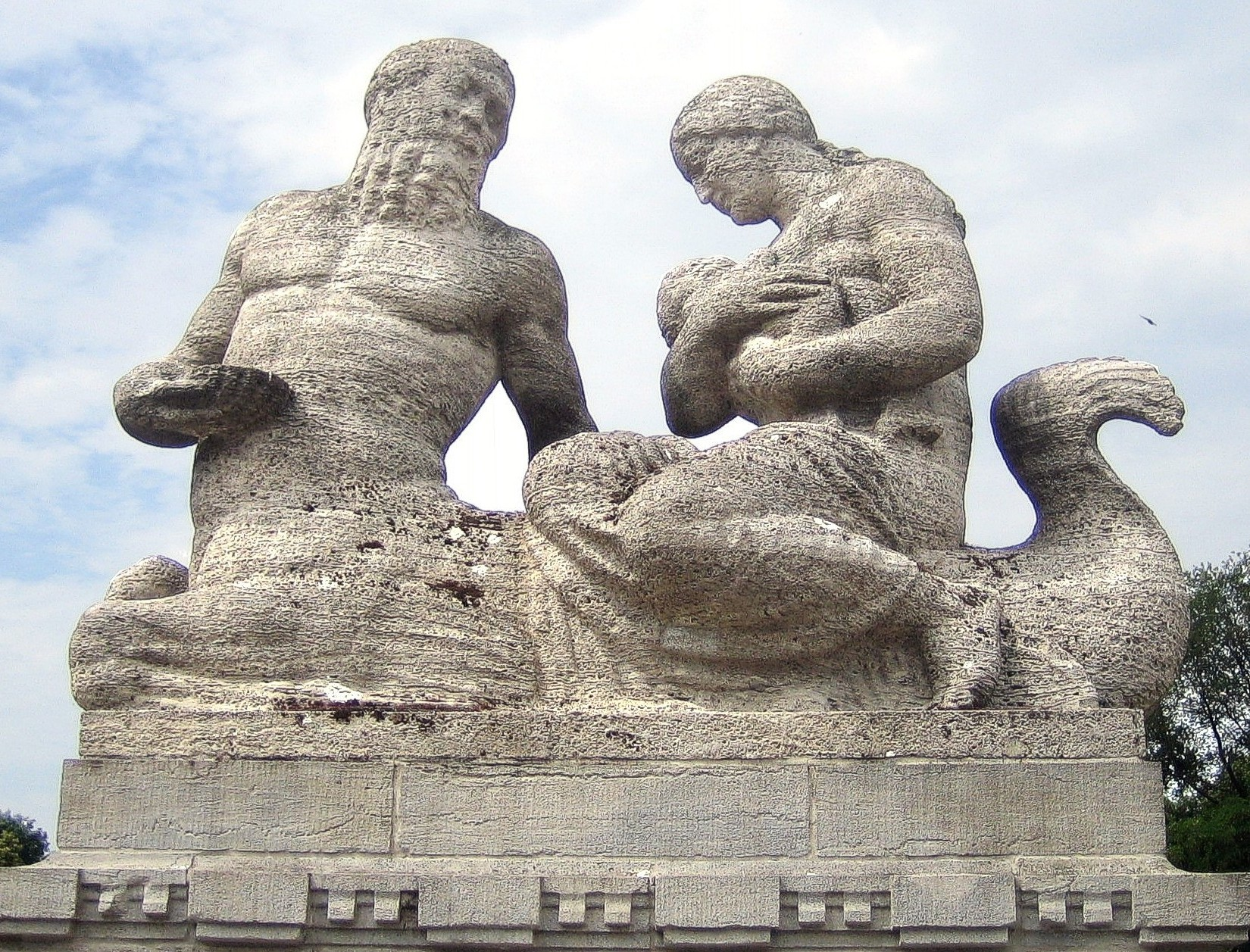
Group of figures Triton with nymph

Construction of the U4 underground line, then an independent Schöneberg line, began in 1908 and opened on 1 December 1910. The Stadtpark underground station (now Rathaus Schöneberg) and the Carl Zuckmayer Bridge were designed by architect Johann Emil Schaudt, who also designed the KaDeWe in 1907. The building features a strict vertical and horizontal structure. The four groups of figures on the parapets, by Richard Guhr, represent "Tritons from mythical times carrying nymphs on their backs across the fenland, which once consisted of a chain of lakes, from one bank to the other."

The town hall was built on the southeastern part of the neighbouring Mühlenberg between 1911 and 1914 under Rudolph Wilde's successor, Mayor Alexander Dominicus, who gave the historic 'Mühlenweg' its current name, Dominicusstraße. In the late 1920s, minor alterations were made to the park. Residents, seeking open spaces for children in the increasingly built-up Schöneberg, prompted the district to open the eastern meadow for public use on three weekday afternoons in 1928.

In 1954, two female statues, Der Morgen (The Morning) and Der Abend (The Evening) by Georg Kolbe, previously in the Ceciliengärten settlement and on Wittenbergplatz after the Second World War, were moved to the park. For Berlin's 750th anniversary in 1987, both sculptures were returned to their original location in the restored Ceciliengärten park between Hauptstraße and Rubensstraße. Der Morgen had been displayed in the German Pavilion at the 1929 World Exhibition in Barcelona.

== Integration into the district ==
=== Townhouses and salons ===
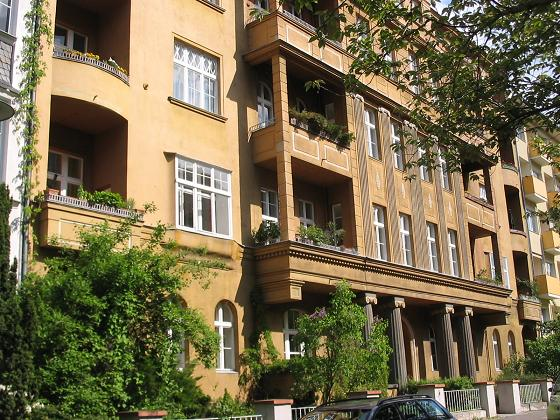
Historic town house, Hewaldstraße

After 1912, landscape architects integrated adjacent roads into the park design. The park sides of Freiherr-vom-Stein-Straße to the north and Fritz-Elsas-Straße to the south were incorporated into the path system. Both streets are speed-restricted zones. Between 1919 and 1957, a street called Am Stadtpark existed, now unnamed. The former RIAS building is located at Kufsteiner Straße and Fritz-Elsas-Straße, while the FHW (formerly DHfP) is on Badenschen Straße. The quiet residential areas around the park now feature middle-class apartment buildings, replacing many Gründerzeit townhouses destroyed in the Second World War.

The nearby Bayerisches Viertel (Bavarian Quarter), designed around 1900 for an upper-class audience, aimed to attract wealthy residents to generate tax revenue for the then-independent Schöneberg. Alongside the villa district in Grunewald and Fichtenberg in Steglitz, it became one of southwest Berlin's most prestigious areas. Elegant façades, large apartments with salons, charming squares, and its own underground line characterised the district, home to prominent figures like Albert Einstein, Arno Holz, Gottfried Benn, and Erwin Piscator. The architecture, styled after small Bavarian towns, led to the name "Bayerisches Viertel" (Bavarian Quarter) or "Klein-Nürnberg" (Little Nuremberg). Due to its high proportion of Jewish residents, it was sometimes called "Jüdische Schweiz" (Jewish Switzerland). The underground station, Carl Zuckmayer Bridge, and Rudolph Wilde Park blended harmoniously into the streetscape.

=== Against forgetting ===
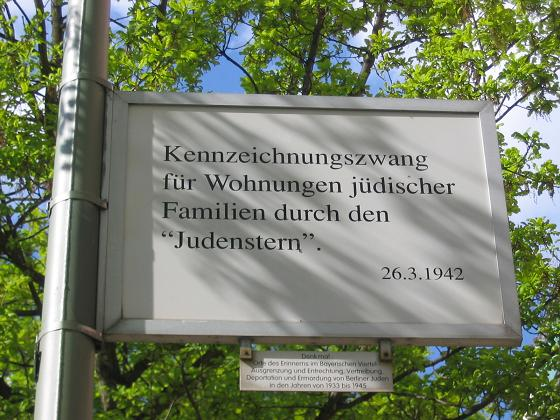
Memorial plaque commemorating the persecution of Jews

To commemorate the deportations, particularly affecting Bayerisches Viertel residents, 80 commemorative plaques and information boards with orientation maps are attached to lampposts throughout the quarter as part of the memorial Places of Remembrance. – Exclusion and Disenfranchisement, Expulsion, Deportation and Murder of Berlin Jews from 1933 to 1945.

The neighbourhood, 60 percent destroyed during the Second World War, retains its street layout and front gardens, though many buildings were replaced by post-war blocks. In 1947, writer Hans Fallada, in his wife's flat on Meraner Straße near the park, described the rubble:

The wind sometimes rattles the poorly stretched cellophane paper in the window frame; a door slams in the burnt-out courtyard building. There are mysterious noises outside all the time. Trickling debris –? Rats searching for something terrible in the cellars –? A destroyed world that needs every ounce of willpower and every helping hand to rebuild it. – Der Alpdruck

The buildings in Rudolph Wilde Park survived the Second World War unscathed, except for the central section of the underground station.
