= Viktoria-Luise-Platz station =

Station of the Berlin U-Bahn

Coordinates: 52°29′46″N 13°20′34″E

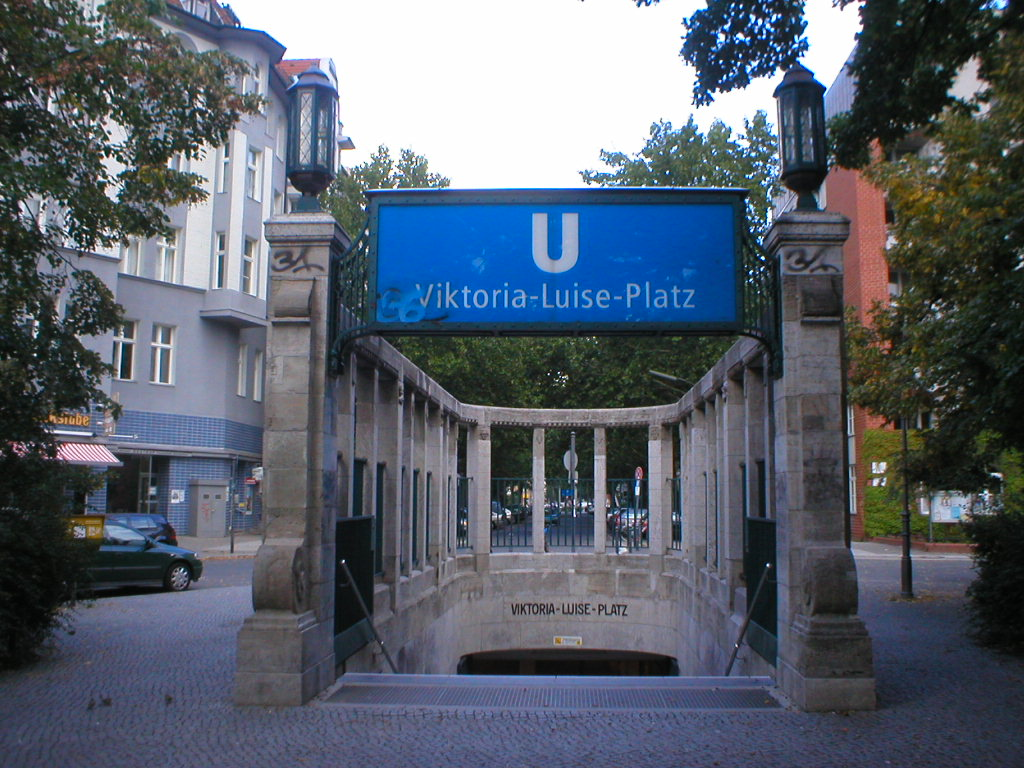
Entrance, Viktoria-Luise-Platz U-Bahn station

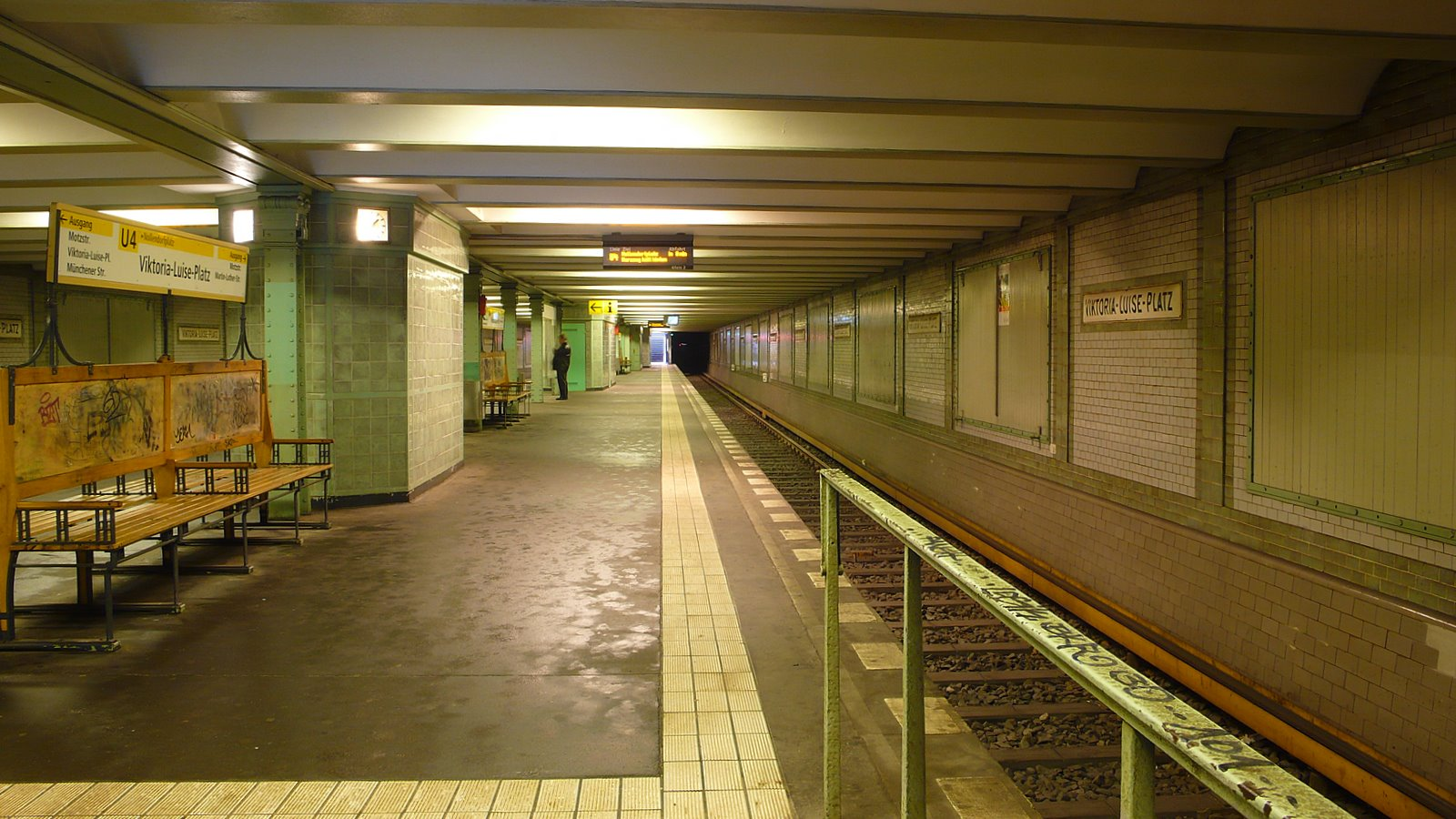
View to the platform

Viktoria-Luise-Platz is a Berlin U-Bahn station located on the U4. In 1910, Town of Schöneberg, now a part of Berlin, built its subway line, the U4. This station was built by E.Deneke. This shallow (4.2 m) station is decorated by green and white tiles on the walls as well as green tiles on the columns. Both the square and the subway station are protected by law as historic landmarks.

During the Second World War, bombing destroyed the station entrance; it was rebuilt in a simplified style after the war. After renovation, the entrance on Geisbergstrasse opened in 2003 and an elevator was added in 2020. The nearest stations "Nollendorfplatz" and "Bayerischer Platz", are both 865 m away.

Preceding station	Berlin U-Bahn	Following station
Bayerischer Platz towards Innsbrucker Platz	U4	Nollendorfplatz Terminus
