= Rathaus Schöneberg station =

Station of the Berlin U-Bahn

Rathaus Schöneberg
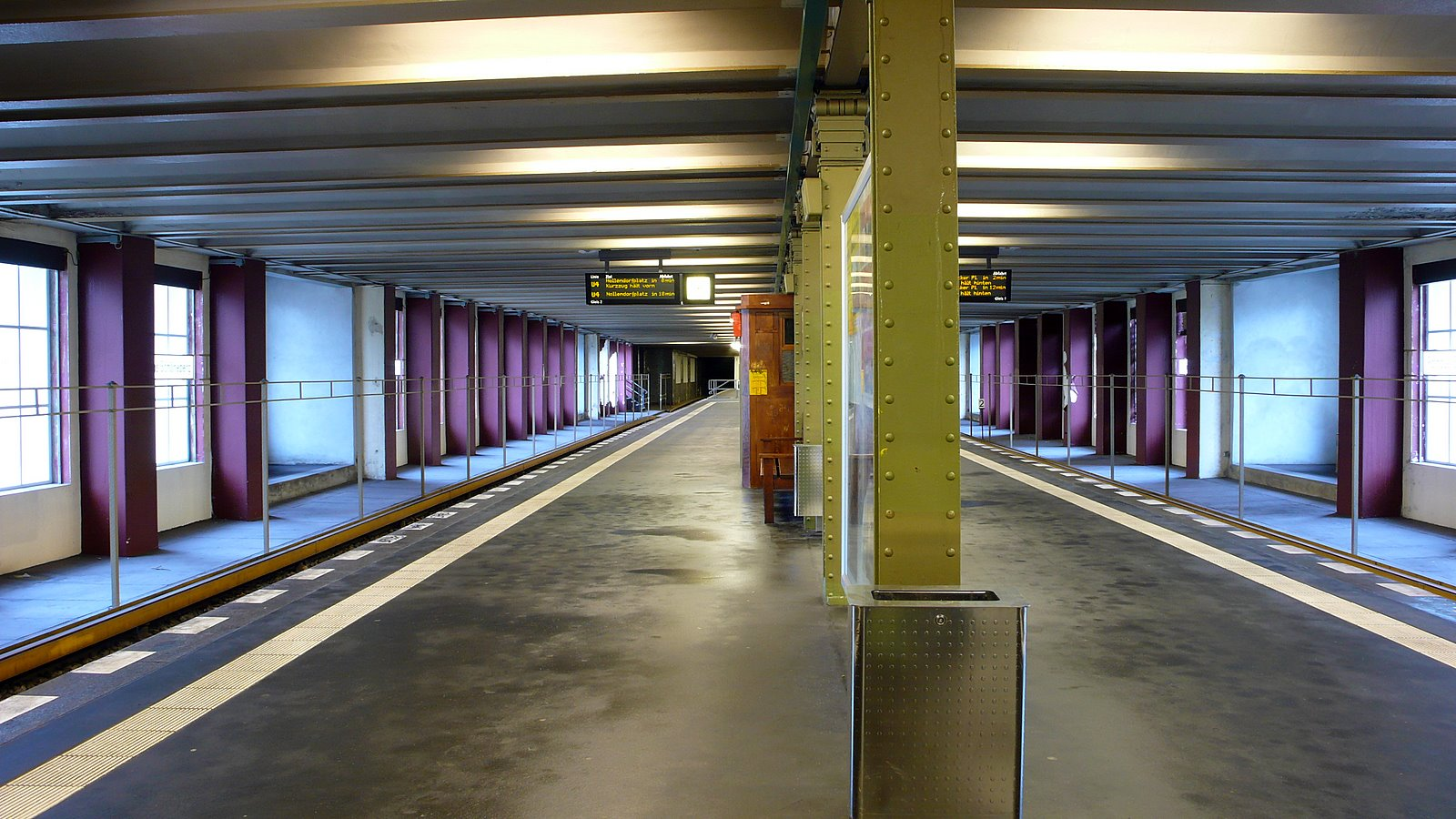
- Platform of the station

General information
- Location: Tempelhof-Schöneberg (Berlin); Germany
- Coordinates: 52°28′59″N 13°20′31″E
- System: Bf
- Operator: Berliner Verkehrsbetriebe
- Line: U4
- Platforms: 1 island platform
- Tracks: 2

Construction
- Structure type: Below grade
- Architect: Johann Emil Schaudt

Other information
- Fare zone: VBB: Berlin A/5555

History
- Opened: 1 October 1910; 116 years ago

Services
Preceding station	Berlin U-Bahn	Following station
Innsbrucker Platz Terminus	U4	Bayerischer Platz towards Nollendorfplatz
Location
- Location within Berlin

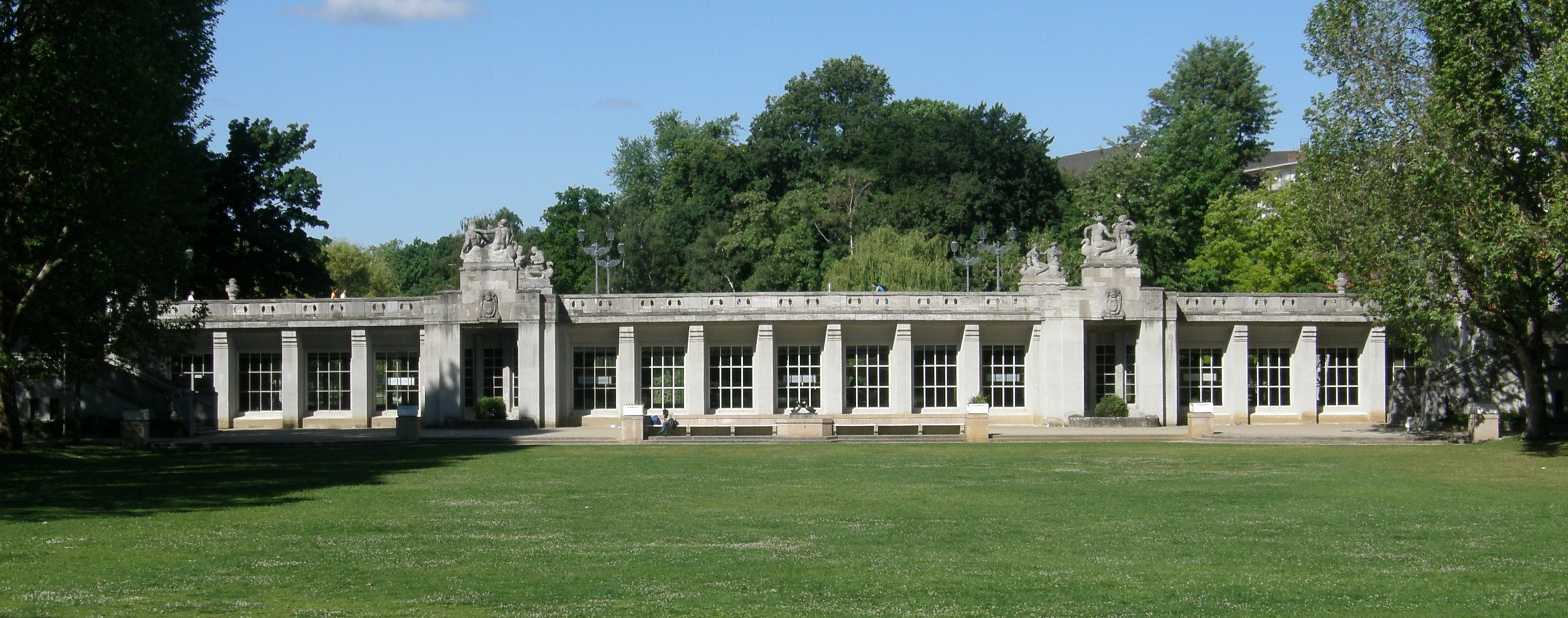
The station seen from Schöneberg Park; above it is the Carl Zuckmeyer Bridge

Rathaus Schöneberg (Schöneberg Town Hall) is a station on the U4 line of the Berlin underground train network.

Designed by architect Johann Emil Schaudt, who also built the Bismarck Monument in Hamburg, the station was first opened in 1910 as Stadtpark (City Park). From 1940 to 1951 it was closed due to damage sustained during the Second World War. It re-opened under the current name in 1951.
