= Rudolph Wilde =

German politician (1857–1910)

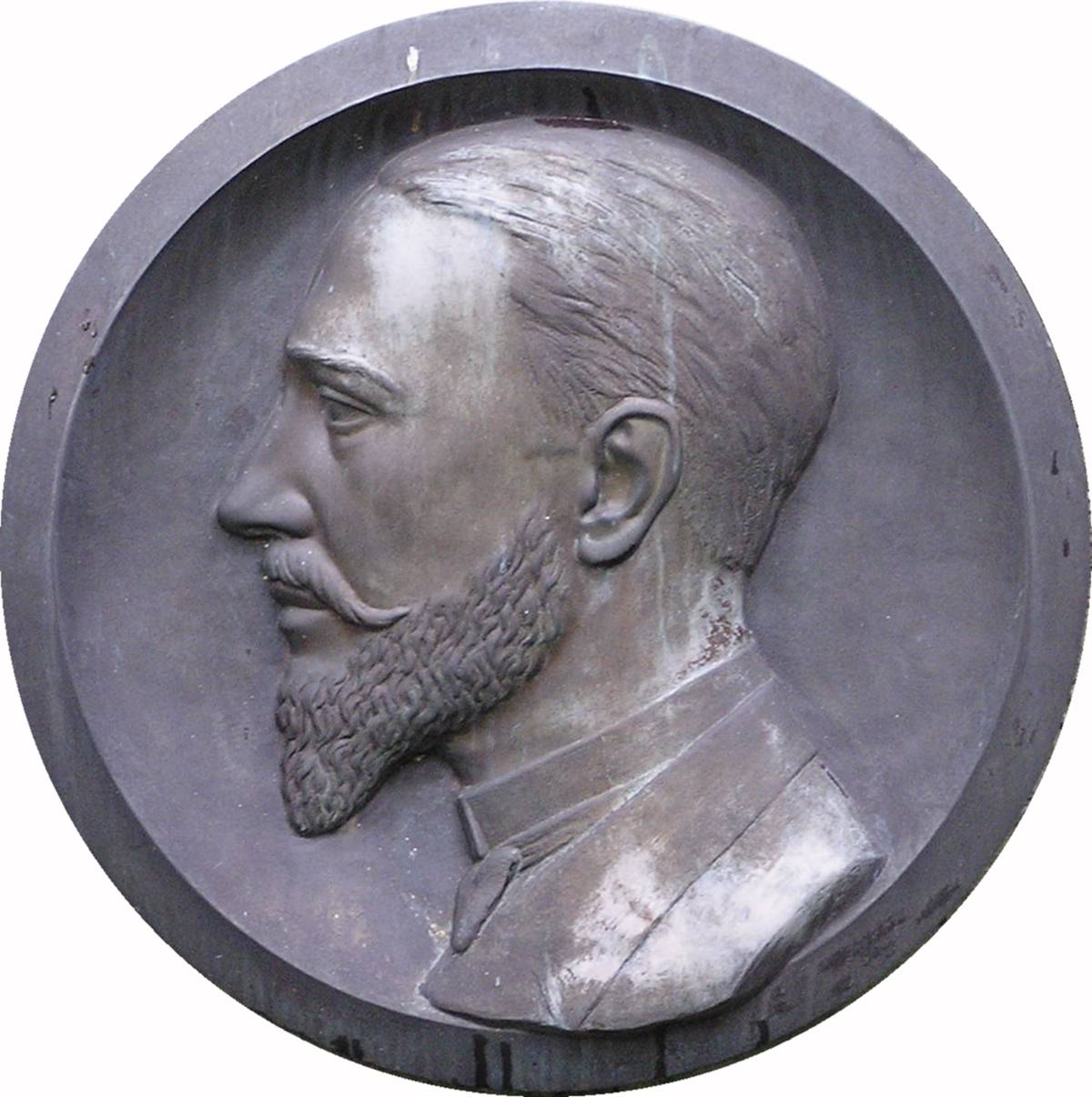
Relief on Wilde's grave showing his likeness

Rudolph Wilde (born 26 May 1857 in Deutsch Krone (West Prussia) (today Wałcz, Poland); died 1 November 1910 in Schöneberg, German Empire) was a German local politician and Mayor of the then independent city of Schöneberg, now a part of Berlin.

== Mayor of Schöneberg ==
Wilde was elected Mayor of Schöneberg in 1898, the same year that Schöneberg was granted city status. In 1902 his title was changed from erster Bürgermeister ("first mayor") to Oberbürgermeister ("Lord Mayor"). His term in office, which ended with his death in 1910 saw a rapid rise in the population of Schöneberg as many people moved into the rapidly growing greater Berlin area to work in the newly emerging industrial jobs. When Wilde took office, Schöneberg had 72,000 inhabitants. When he died, that figure had grown to 173,000. To manage this growth and to cope with the rising population, Wilde was among the first proponents of a subway line in Schöneberg, which was built in just two years (1908–1910) using municipal funds as the de:Hochbahngesellschaft was unwilling to invest private capital into what it deemed a low-profit enterprise. The subway line thus became the first in Germany built on behalf of the public sector and opened a month after his death. It is today U4 of the Berlin U-Bahn network.
