= U4 (Berlin U-Bahn) =

Subway line in Berlin, Germany

- Rathaus Schöneberg, one of the five stations on the U4

Overview
- Locale: Berlin
- Termini: Nollendorfplatz; Innsbrucker Platz
- Stations: 5

Service
- Type: Rapid transit
- System: Berlin U-Bahn
- Operator: Berliner Verkehrsbetriebe
- Depot: Grunewald
- Rolling stock: A3

History
- Opened: 1 December 1910; 115 years ago
- Separated from Line B: 28 February 1966

Technical
- Line length: 2.9 km (1.8 mi)
- Track gauge: 1,435 mm (4 ft 8 1/2 in) standard gauge
- Loading gauge: Kleinprofil
- Electrification: 750 V DC third rail (top running)
Route map
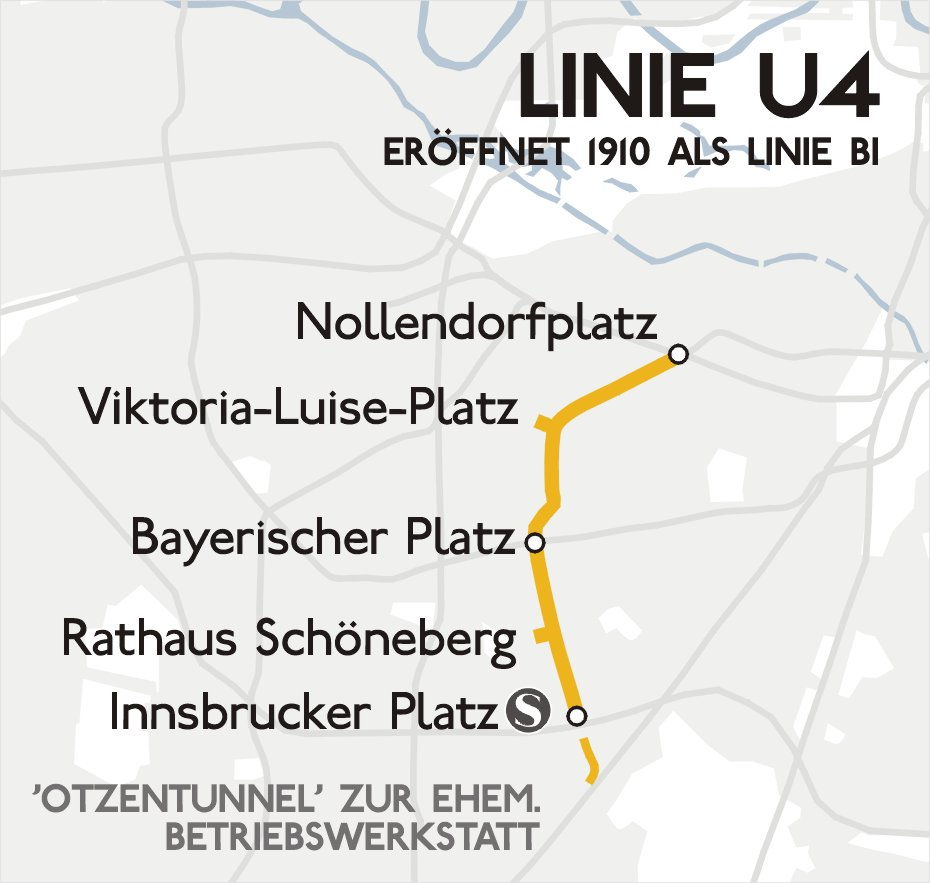

The U4 is a line of the Berlin U-Bahn in Germany that is the shortest in Berlin's U-Bahn system, with a length of 2.86 kilometres (1.78 mi). Opened in 1910, the U4 serves five stations, all of which are step-free: it is also the only subway line in Berlin to have never been extended and the only one to have no night service on weekends.

In 1903, Schöneberg, an independent city that was south-west of the municipal limits of Berlin, planned to develop an underground railway line to improve public transportation. As the line promised less profit for private investors (all Berlin U-Bahn lines had until then been built with private capital), negotiations with the Berliner Hochbahngesellschaft (Berlin Elevated Railway Company, the operator of Berlin U-Bahn) were unsuccessful.

That made Schöneberg start to build the line itself on 8 December 1908. Two years later, the construction was finished, and on 1 December 1910, the line was put into operation. Although Schöneberg owned the track, upon the line's opening, the city handed operations over to the Hochbahngesellschaft.

== History ==
The independent town of Schöneberg wanted to increase its growth and so decided in 1903 to build an U-Bahn line. There were talks with the Berlin Hochbahngesellschaft (U-Bahn operator). However, the interests of the operator and of the city did not match because the short line promised little ridership and was deemed unlikely to make a profit. That made the city of Schöneberg take matters into its own hands and plan the first municipal U-Bahn in Germany. The route was intended as an underground railway from Nollendorfplatz, where an elevated train station of the Berlin Hoch- und Untergrundbahn already existed, to the Hauptstraße (main street) in the south of Schöneberg. Extension to the north was considered for the future, and even a route to Weißensee (following the proposed U3/U10 alignment) was proposed. Firstly, however, Nollendorfplatz station (the new line initially built its own tunnel station on Motzstraße in front of the existing station), Victoria-Luise-Platz station, Bayerischer Platz station, Stadtpark (now Rathaus Schöneberg station) and Hauptstraße (now Innsbrucker Platz station) were planned. South of the Hauptstraße, the workshop was to be built. Because the line was separate from the pre-existing underground railway, new equipment was required.

Schöneberg chose to use tracks and trains that were compatible with the rest of the fledgling network to allow future connections. Thus, the U4 was also built to what is now known as Kleinprofil (the narrower loading gauge used in Berlin), as the Großprofil lines did not exist yet. Track gauge and electrification follow the same standard on all Berlin U-Bahn lines, with standard gauge and third rail electrification at 750-volt DC.

Siemens & Halske AEG were tasked with all aspects of construction, including the equipment of the track and the delivery of the vehicles. Such a contract would be now called "turnkey". A groundbreaking ceremony was held on 8 December 1908.

Next to the construction site of the subway was Rudolph Wilde Park, which was then called Stadtpark (City Park or Municipal Park), just like the subway station. As the park was built on a marshy fen that was up to 30 meters (98 ft) deep, the material that was excavated from the tunnels, with a total volume of around 850,000 m^{3} (30,000,000 cu ft), was used to drain and to fill the land where necessary. After two years of construction, the line was opened on 1 December 1910 as Line B^{I}. However, the festivities were rather subdued since the "father" of Schöneberg's subway, Mayor Rudolph Wilde, had died a month earlier. Schöneberg thus became the second city in the German Empire to build a subway, ahead of Hamburg U-Bahn, which opened in 1912, and the first to follow the now-common model of financing a project municipally to be realised by private contractors. The previous method was having all aspects handled by the private sector, with the government acting only as a regulatory and a concession-granting entity.

Since the Schöneberg subway was initially completely separate from the rest of the Berlin U-Bahn network, extra facilities had to be built to accommodate it. Those included an entirely-separate fleet and depot with a workshop. At Nollendorfplatz, a pedestrian tunnel was built between the newly built station of the Schöneberg subway and the existing station of the Hochbahngesellschaft to allow passengers to seamlessly connect between the two systems.

South of Innsbrucker Platz station, the tunnel was continued into Eisackstraße. There was a three-track crossover and parking facility in the tunnel. From the western track, the workshop access line branched off to the workshop, which connected to a dedicated tunnel to Otzenstraße and reached daylight on the workshop area. The tunnel exit is still visible at the end of the tunnel in Otzenstraße. At the end of the workshop area was another short tunnel, where the access track ended. The workshop received a five-track wagon hall and a two-track workshop hall. The small Schöneberg workshop became unused with the opening of the new interchange station at Nollendorfplatz in 1926 and therefore was decommissioned in 1932, as trains could now easily pass from the Schöneberg subway to the rest of the Berlin U-Bahn network and use the large U-Bahn workshops at the Berlin Olympiastadion station and at Warschauer Brücke (now called Berlin Warschauer Straße station).

After the Second World War, the Waldenburg Oberschule was built on the former workshop grounds. Nowadays, trains use a spur track that connects line U4 to line U1, where they can access the Warschauer Straße Depot on the latter line. In the course of construction of Bundesautobahn 100, the long-unused tunnel to the defunct depot was interrupted, which significantly hinders any potential extension southward (see below).

The city of Schöneberg owned the infrastructure of the route, but the operation was run by the Hochbahngesellschaft. Thus, the different ownership did not matter at all for the passengers since one day earlier, a collective agreement had been reached. Ticketing and fares were thus handled by the Hochbahngesellschaft, which was in some sense a precursor to a Verkehrsverbund. As the numerous small independent cities in the Greater Berlin Area were seen as an anachronistic nuisance, the new Free State of Prussia quickly decided to redraw the municipal boundaries of Berlin. This resulted in the Greater Berlin Act of 1920, which merged Schöneberg, along with many other cities, into Berlin. In the course of the Weimar Republic, the Stadtrat (municipal councilor) in charge of Berlin transportation at the time, Ernst Reuter, created Berliner Verkehrsbetriebe which absorbed the former Schöneberg subway and has run it ever since.

The second subway in Germany thus existed as an independent entity for barely a decade.

From 1985 to 1993, automatic train operation using the SelTrac system was trialled on line U4. The SelTrac system that was used on line U4 was manufactured by Standard Elektrik Lorenz (later part of Alcatel-Lucent), and allowed very tight headways of 50 to 90 seconds. It was the first trial service of an automatic U-Bahn in Germany, but to alleviate riders' concerns, a driver was still present. Concurrently, the M-Bahn also ran a fully automated revenue service for a short while before reunification necessitated the dismantling of the M-Bahn and its replacement with the U-Bahn, whose temporarily abandoned right of way the M-Bahn had used. It would take until the 2008 opening of Nuremberg's U3 before automatic operation would be seen on a German subway line again.

On 27 November 2010, the occasion of the 100th anniversary of the Schöneberg subway, a commemorative service with historical rolling stock (type A1) was run.

== Operations ==
The turn-of-the-century predictions turned out to be accurate since ridership on U4 is lower than on other lines in the system, partly because of the short length of the line. All other Berlin U-Bahn lines run at night on weekends, but that is not the case for U4 (the only other line with that distinction was the temporary U55 prior to its connection to U5 in 2020). Nonetheless, a five-minute headway is maintained at peak times, which decreases to ten- or fifteen-minute headways at less busy times of the week.

== Extension plans ==
U4 is the only subway line in Berlin never to have been extended despite plans at the time of its construction that would eventually extend the line (see above). A southward extension would have significant technical hurdles to overcome since the tunnel of Bundesautobahn 100 is in the way, and there seems to be no appetite for removing the section of A100. There were various plans for a modest northward extension towards Magdeburger Platz in the 2000s, but it has ultimately determined that the shift of passengers to the newly extended line would be unlikely to justify the expense and so those plans were shelved.
