= Nollendorfplatz station =

Berlin U-Bahn station

Nollendorfplatz
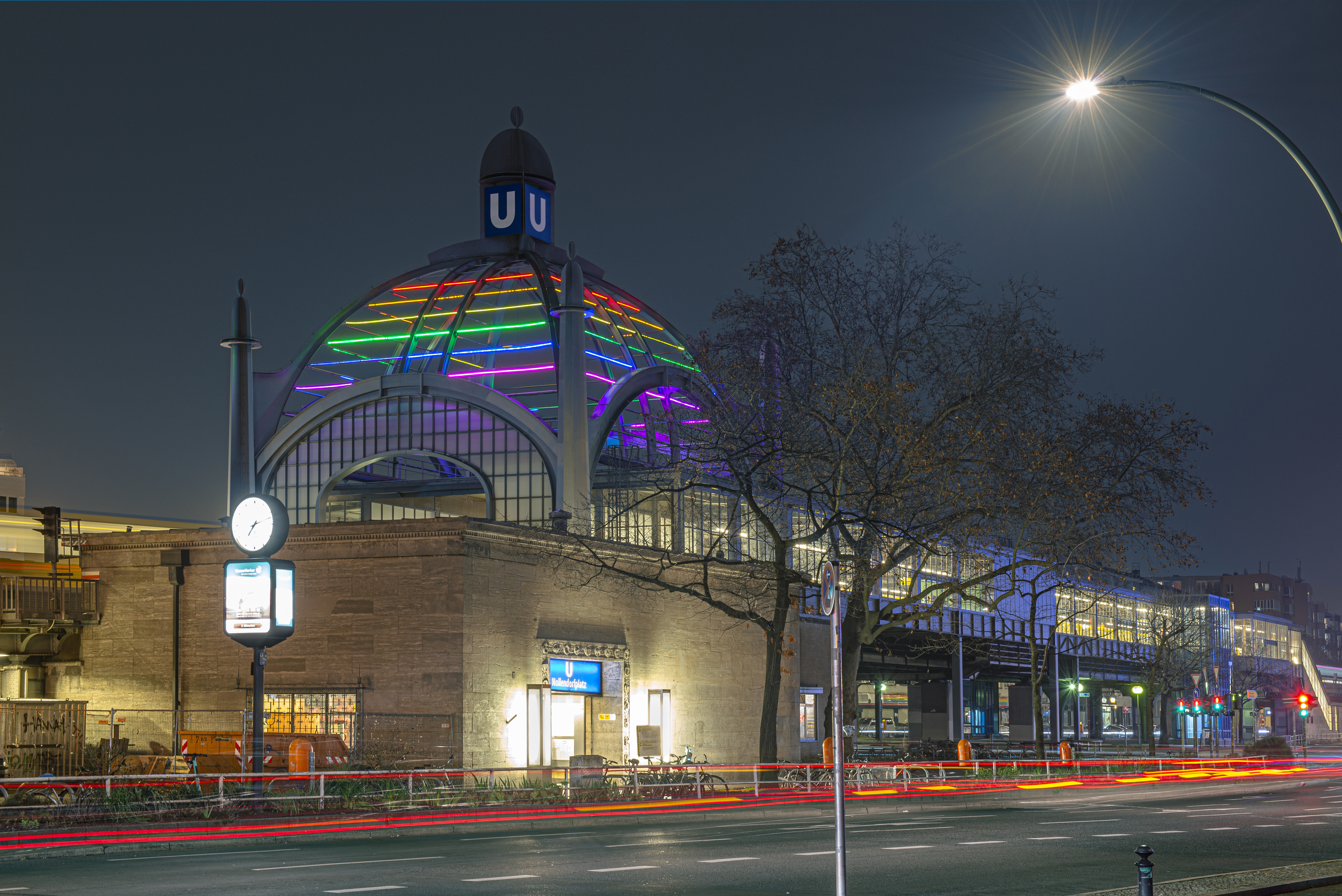
- A U2 train enters the elevated portion of the station

General information
- Location: Nollendorfplatz; Schöneberg, Berlin; Germany
- Coordinates: 52°29′57″N 13°21′14″E
- System: Cross-platform interchange
- Owner: Berliner Verkehrsbetriebe
- Operator: Berliner Verkehrsbetriebe
- Platforms: 2 stacked island platforms (U1, U3, U4); 2 side platforms (U2)
- Tracks: 6 (2 elevated, 4 underground)
- Connections: : 106, 187, N1, N2, N26; : M19

Construction
- Structure type: Underground (U1, U3, U4); Elevated (U2)
- Platform levels: 3
- Cycle facilities: Yes
- Accessible: true

Other information
- Station code: Nm (underground, eastbound); Nu (underground, westbound); No (elevated)
- Fare zone: : Berlin A/5555

History
- Opened: 11 March 1902 (elevated); 26 October 1926 (underground)

Services
Preceding station	Berlin U-Bahn	Following station
Wittenbergplatz towards Uhlandstraße	U1	Kurfürstenstraße towards Warschauer Straße
Wittenbergplatz towards Ruhleben	U2	Bülowstraße towards Pankow
Wittenbergplatz towards Krumme Lanke	U3	Kurfürstenstraße towards Warschauer Straße
Viktoria-Luise-Platz towards Innsbrucker Platz	U4	Terminus
Route map
U1/U3/U4 station
U2 station
Location
- Location within Berlin

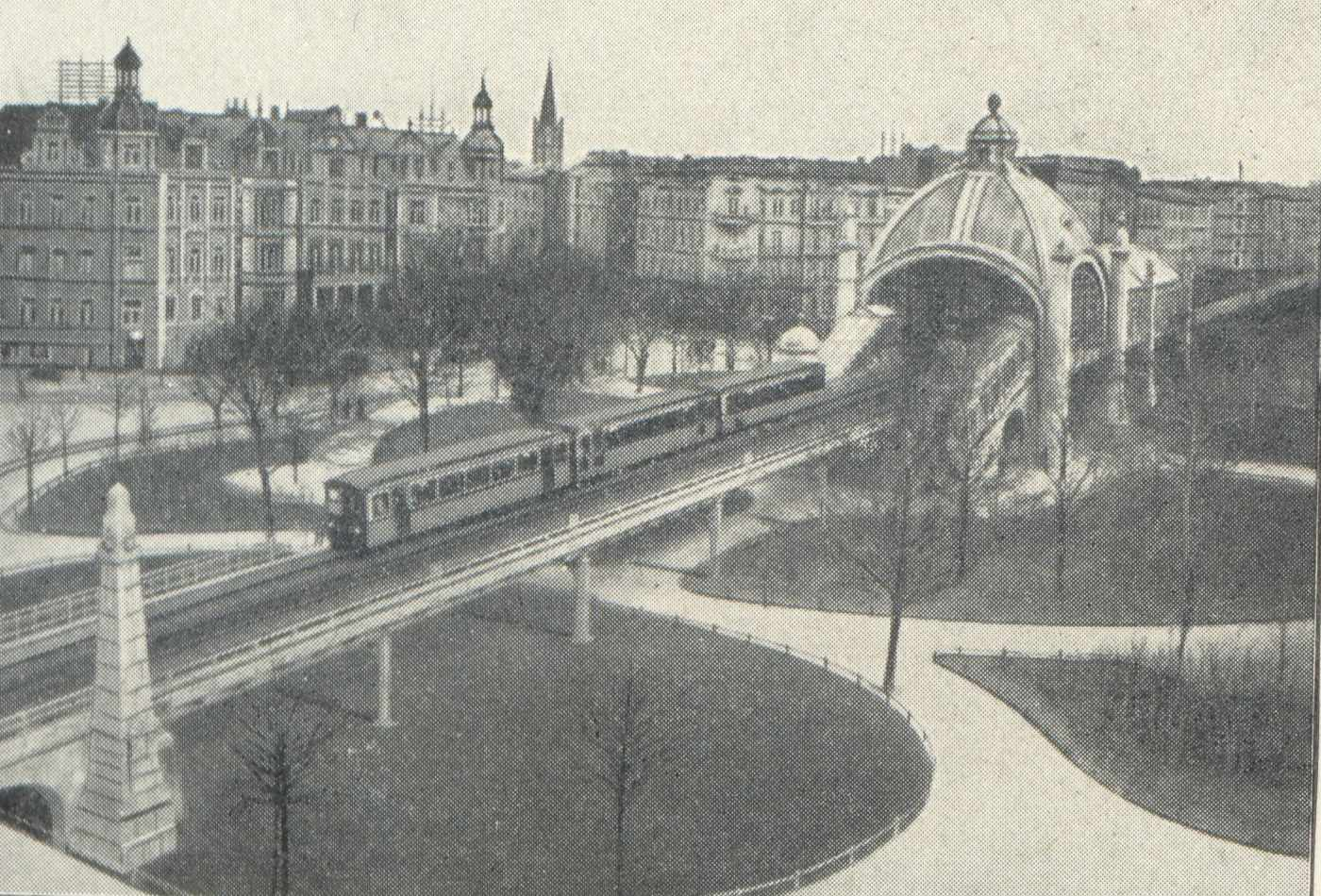
Station Nollendorfplatz c. 1903

Nollendorfplatz is a Berlin U-Bahn station on lines U1, U2, U3, and U4. It opened in 1902, and today is the only station in Berlin that is served by four U-Bahn lines, and the only one served by all of the Kleinprofil (small profile) lines.

== Overview ==
The station, and the plaza named after Nakléřov in the Czech Republic, lies in the north of Schöneberg at the junction of Motzstraße, Kleiststraße and Bülowstraße. The area is an important centre of gay culture, and the nearby Winterfeldtplatz is home to a well known market. It became a more run down centre of heroin addiction, punks, and squatters in the 1970s and early 1980s, and has seen a comeback into the (somewhat intellectual) mainstream culture with higher rents and upscale restaurants and bookshops. In this it resembles (and indeed was a role model for) the western part of Kreuzberg. In 2002, the station was given an Art Nouveau styled dome, which resembles the one it had before World War Two, designed by Cremer & Wolffenstein.

== Gallery ==
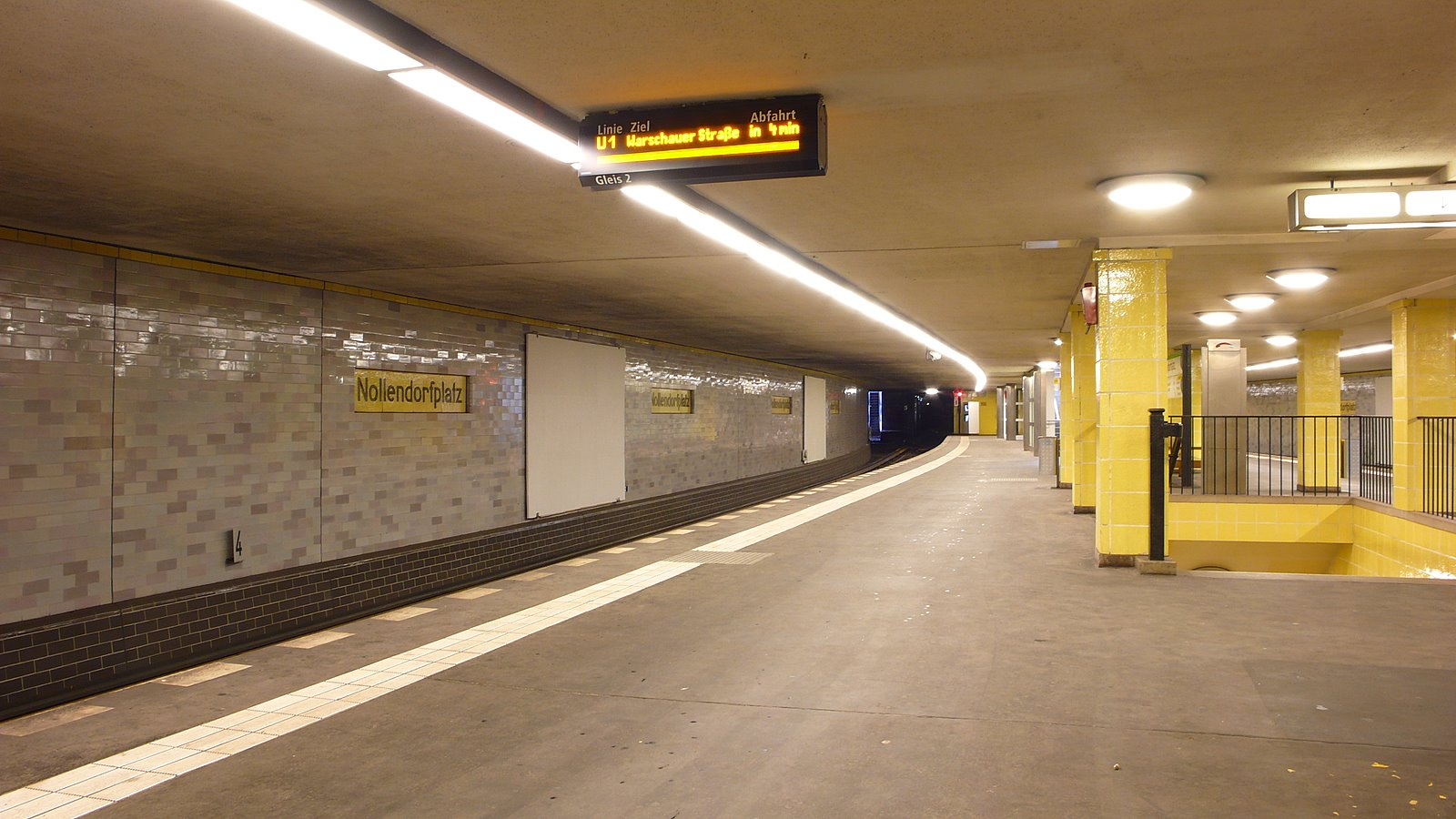
Underground platform

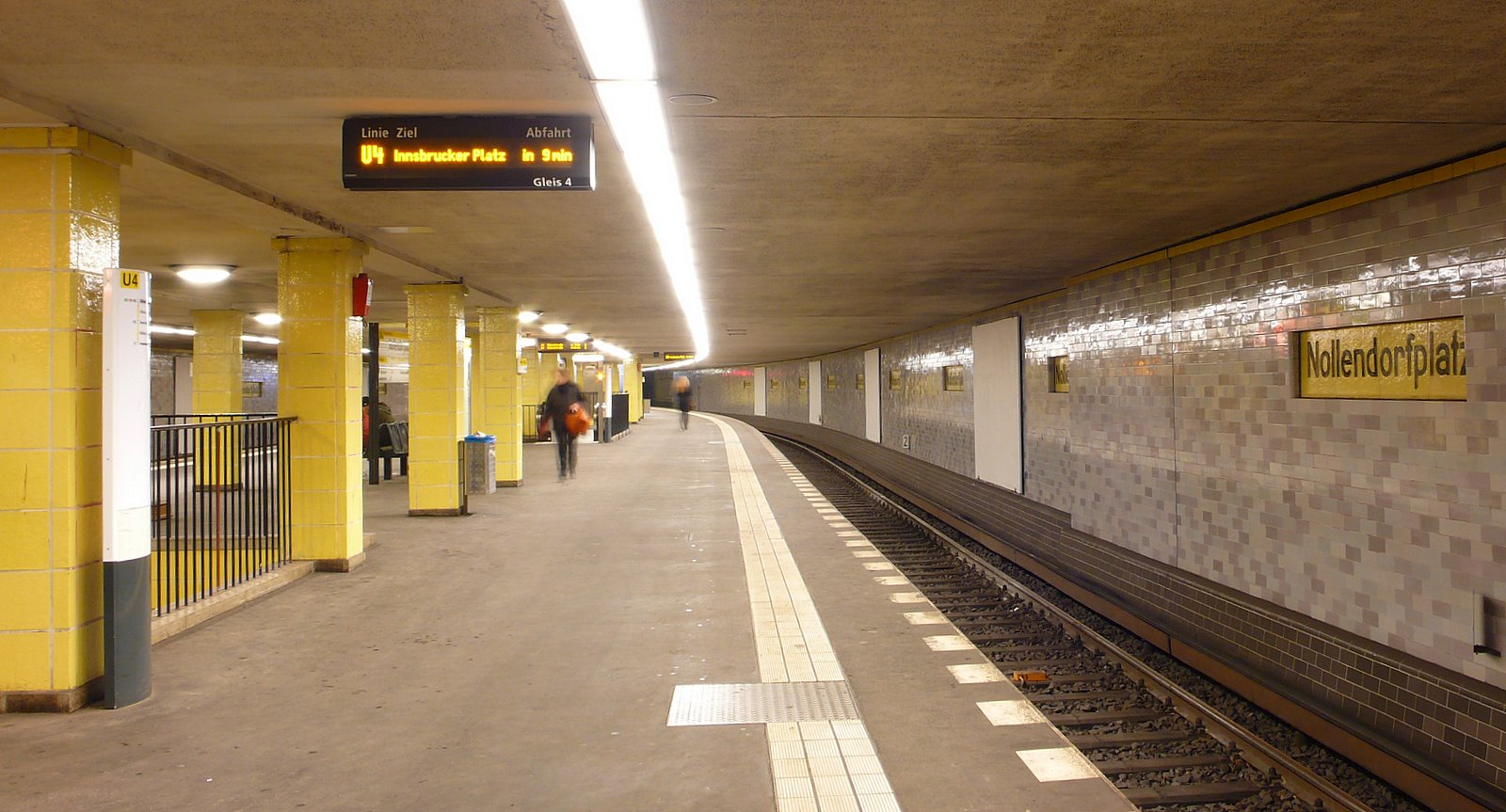
Underground platform

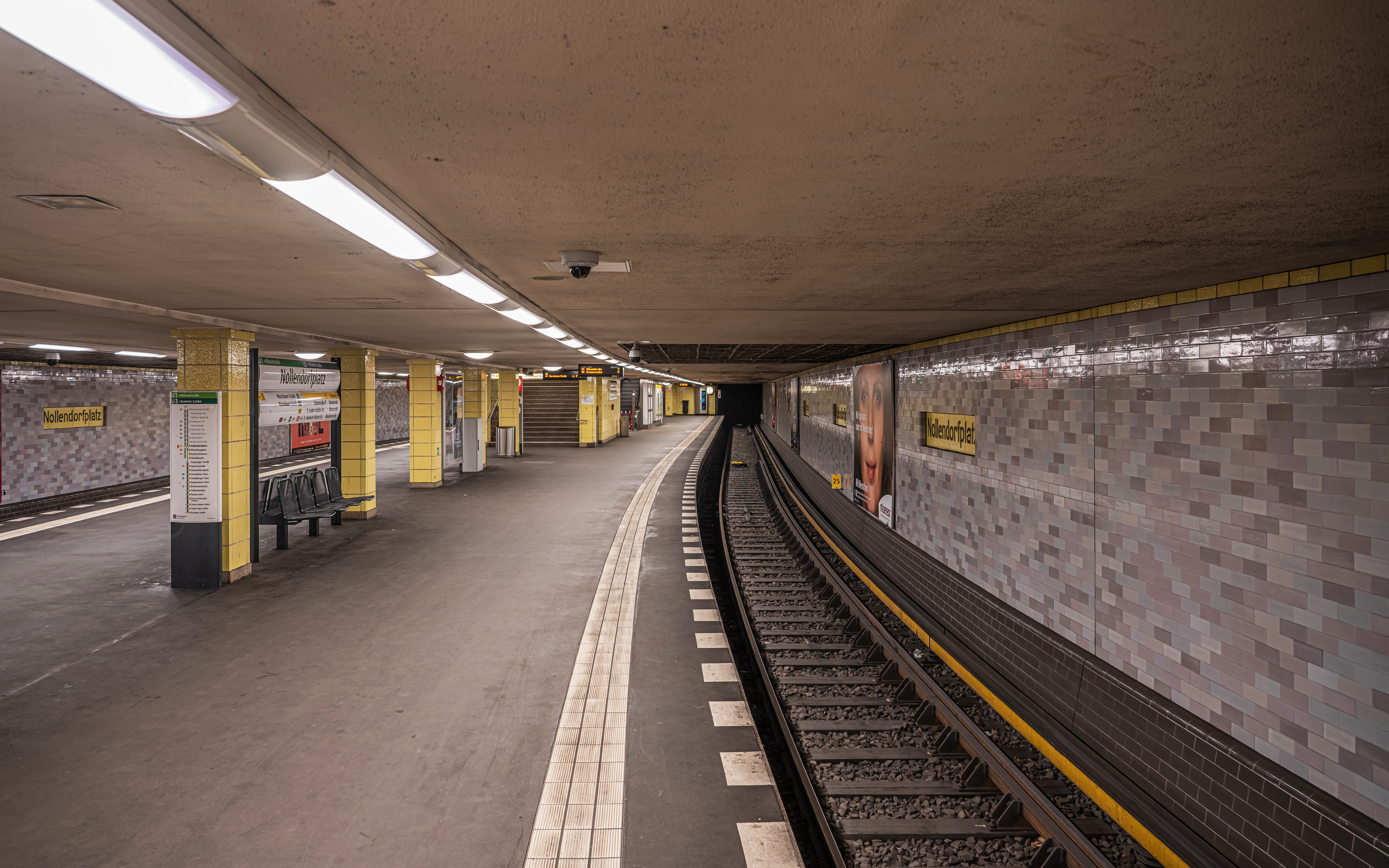
Underground platform

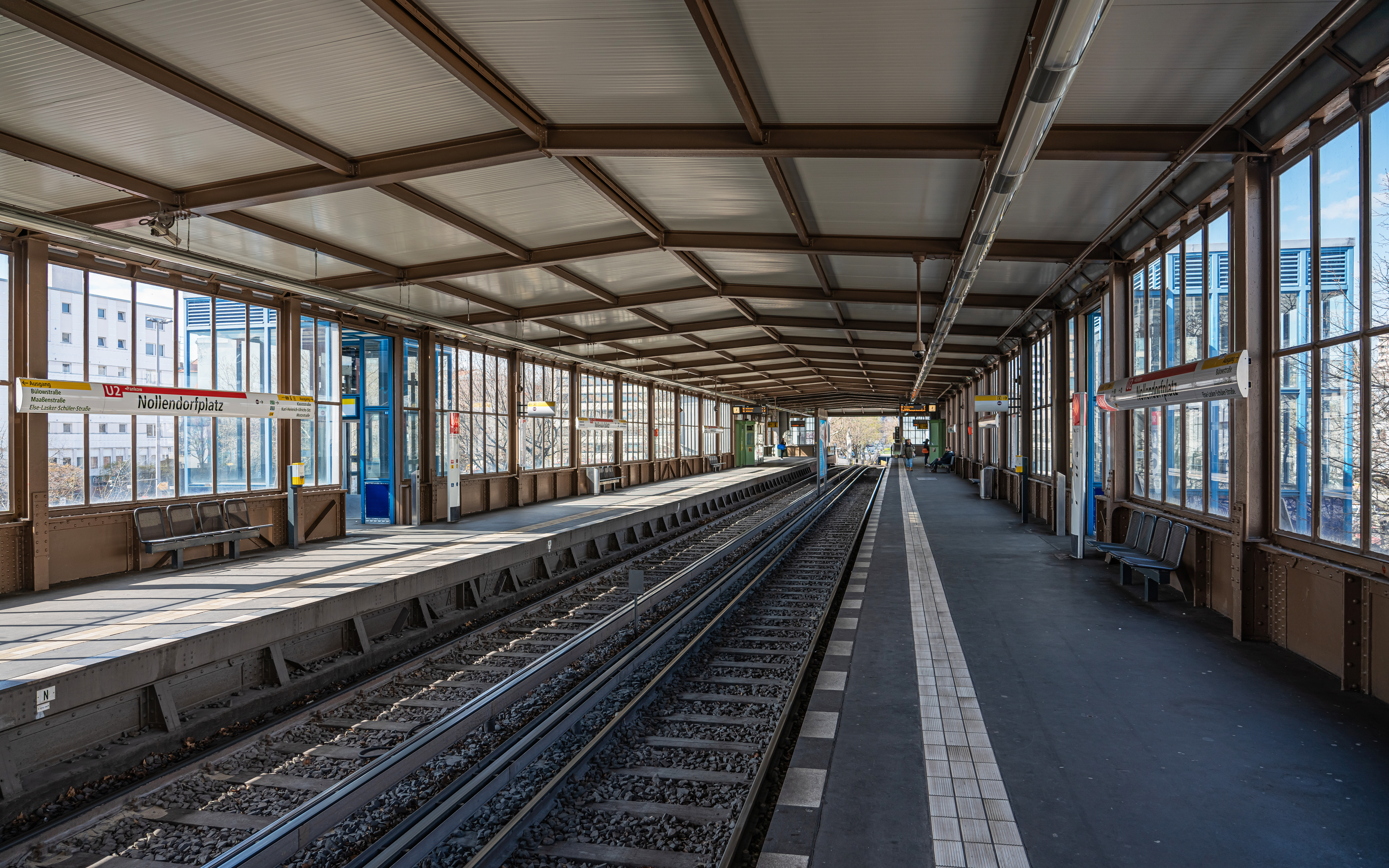
U2 platforms
