= Berlin Innsbrucker Platz station =

Railway station in Schöneberg, Berlin, Germany

Coordinates: 52°28′43″N 13°20′38″E

Innsbrucker Platz
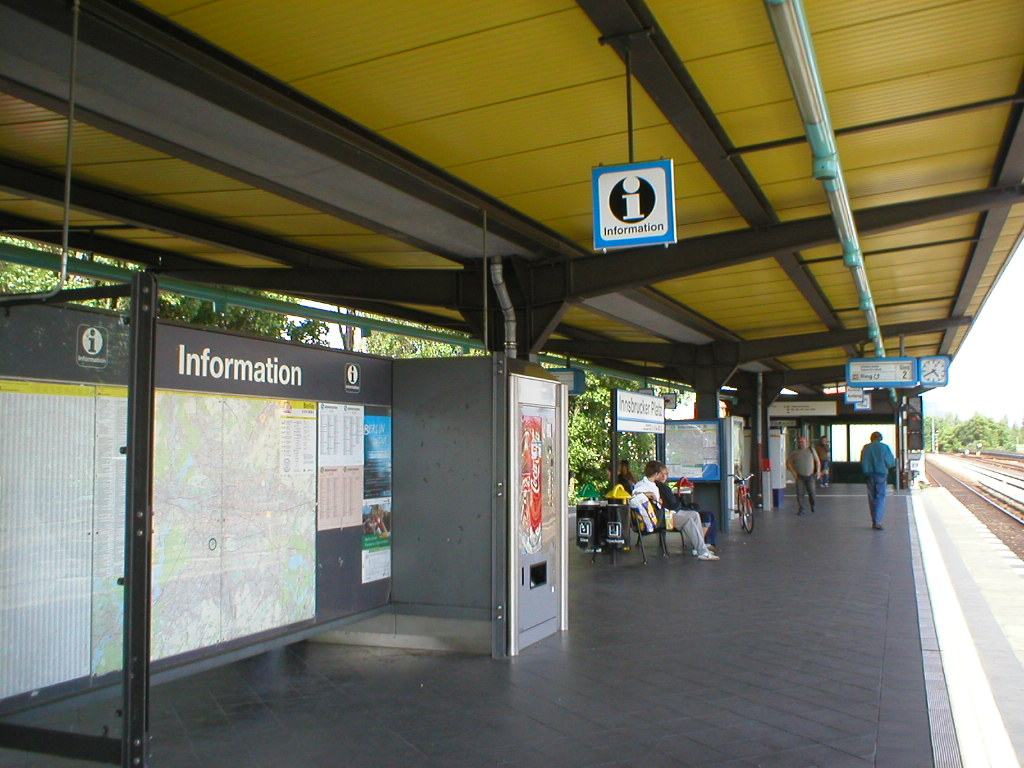

General information
- Owner: DB Netz
- Operator: DB Station&Service
- Lines: Ringbahn; U4
- Platforms: 1 island platform
- Tracks: 2
- Train operators: S-Bahn Berlin
- Connections: 143, 187, 248, M48, M85

Construction
- Structure type: Above ground (S-Bahn); Underground (U-Bahn)
- Accessible: Yes

Other information
- Station code: 2998
- DS100 code: BIP
- IBNR: 8089106
- Category: 4
- Fare zone: VBB: Berlin A/5555
- Website: www.bahnhof.de

Services
Preceding station	Berlin S-Bahn	Following station
Schöneberg One-way operation	S41	Bundesplatz Ringbahn (clockwise)
Schöneberg Ringbahn (counter-clockwise)	S42	Bundesplatz One-way operation
Bundesplatz towards Westend	S46	Schöneberg towards Königs Wusterhausen
Preceding station	Berlin U-Bahn	Following station
Terminus	U4	Rathaus Schöneberg towards Nollendorfplatz
Location

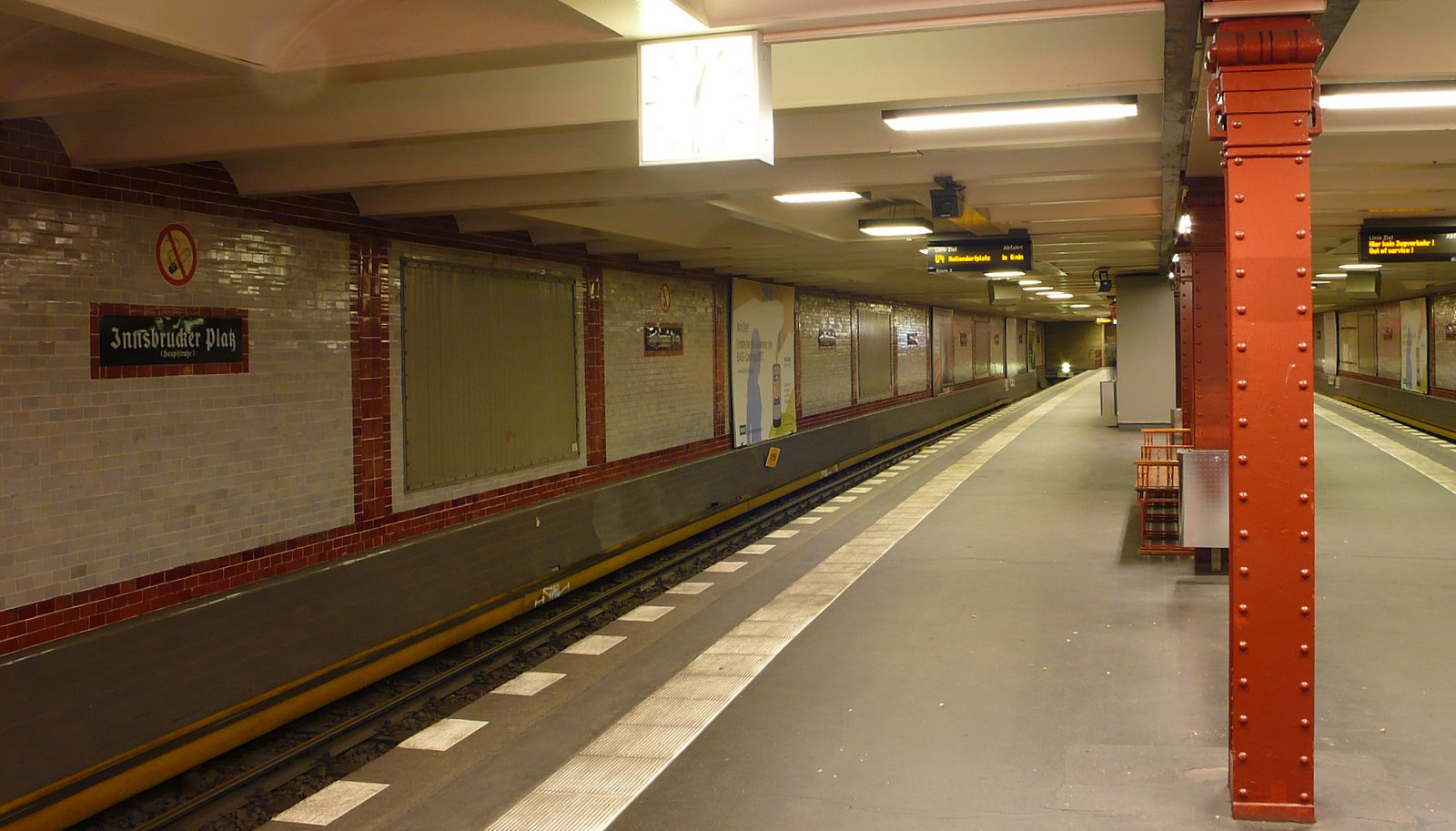
Platform view of U4

Berlin Innsbrucker Platz is a railway station in the Schöneberg district of Berlin and located on the square of the same name. It is served by the Ringbahn lines S41, S42 and S46 of the Berlin S-Bahn. It is also the terminus of the U-Bahn line U4.

== History ==
The U-Bahn station opened in 1910 with the original name Hauptstraße, named after the section of the Reichsstraße 1 running through the districts of Schöneberg and Friedenau. When the S-Bahn station was opened in 1933, it was renamed Innsbrucker Platz, after the Tyrolean capital Innsbruck.

After the underground station had been badly damaged in World War II, it was put back into operation on 16 December 1945. The access to the station was completely rebuilt in 1954. The access on the central island on Innsbrucker Platz was closed, instead, a new entrance was created north of the square, on Innsbrucker Straße, in a glazed pavilion typical to the style of the 1950s, which led directly to the platform via a staircase.

Between 1971 and 1979, the construction of the Stadtautobahn 100, built through a tunnel under the Innsbrucker Platz, made a further conversion to the U-Bahn station necessary. Between the road surface and the motorway tunnel, a large distribution floor was created, and the southern tunnel of the existing subway was separated. This made an extension of the U4 to the south no longer possible, and also the sidings south of the station could not be used. Since then, the tracks of the U4 end bluntly on the platform.
