= Association of Victims of Stalinism =

German human rights organization

The Association of Victims of Stalinism (German: Vereinigung der Opfer des Stalinismus, VOS) is a German human rights organisation, formed by victims of Stalinism on 9 February 1950 in West Berlin. During the Cold War, the western-based association was a constant target of the infamous Stasi of East Germany. The organisation moved its headquarters to Bonn after the construction of the Berlin Wall, but moved back to Berlin in 1998. After 1989, it grew quickly as many former residents of East Germany joined the organisation. The organisation publishes the magazine Freiheitsglocke (i.e. Liberty Bell).

Its deputy head is Hugo Diederich.
