= Crusade for Freedom =

US propaganda and public radio fundraising campaign

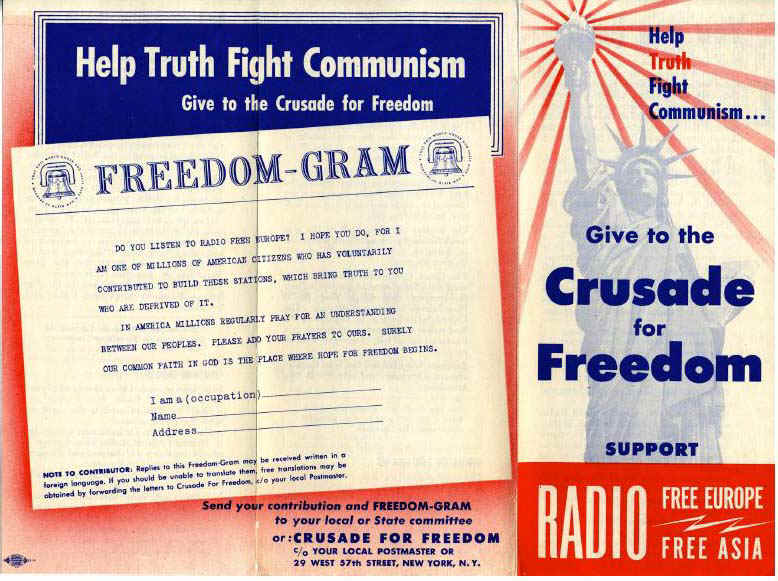
Message urging Americans to send Freedom-Grams through the Crusade

The Crusade for Freedom was an American propaganda campaign operating from 1950–1960. Its public goal was to raise funds for Radio Free Europe; it also served to conceal the CIA's funding of Radio Free Europe and to generate domestic support for American Cold War policies.

General Dwight D. Eisenhower inaugurated the Crusade for Freedom on 4 September 1950. The first chairman was Lucius D. Clay, Eisenhower's successor as military governor of occupied Germany. The Crusade for Freedom, officially managed by the National Committee for a Free Europe (NCFE), had direct ties to the Office of Policy Coordination, the State Department, and the Central Intelligence Agency (CIA).

One of the Crusade's first actions was to create a Freedom Bell, designed after the American Liberty Bell. This bell traveled around the United States, along with a Freedom Scroll for people to sign, and was then sent to West Berlin, where it was dedicated by Clay on 24 October 1950. Crusaders also organized rallies, parades, and contests to mobilize support from ordinary Americans.

== Origins ==
The Crusade was conceived during 1948–1950 under the auspices of Frank Wisner and the Office of Policy Coordination (OPC). The OPC began seeking ways to implement NSC 20/4, a National Security Council directive to "place the maximum strain on the Soviet structure of power and particularly on the relationships between Moscow and the satellite countries." After the National Committee for a Free Europe (NCFE) was formed in May 1949, its backers decided that to appear legitimate the organization would need to seem independently funded.

NCFE hired public relations experts Abbott Washburn and Nate Crabtree to help create a public image for its efforts. According to Washburn, "They said, 'if we can get something that will raise some money, too, that's great,' but it was clear that their first desire was involvement by the public to make this a volunteer thing." Washburn and Crabtree suggested using the Liberty Bell as the symbol for the Crusade and, under instructions from the NCFE, sought out General Lucius D. Clay as its chairman. (Clay had won popularity and recognition through his supervision of the Berlin Airlift).

Early on, the Crusade gained promises of support and cooperation from key individuals and groups, including John J. McCloy, high commissioner in West Germany, and the Advertising Council, a high-profile public-relations group previously known as the War Advertising Council.

=== Eisenhower speech ===
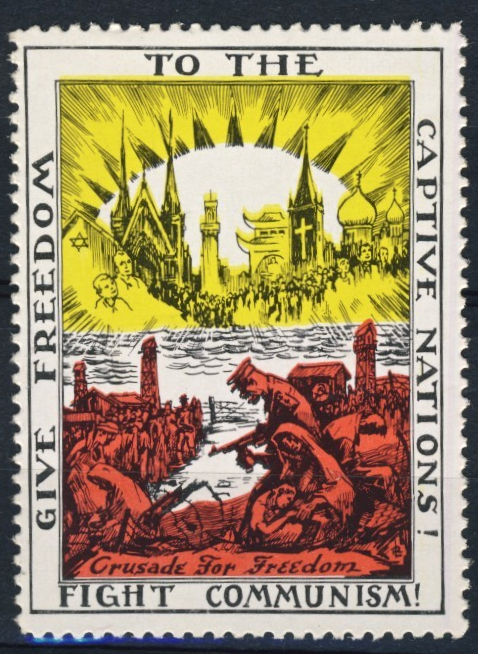
Crusade for Freedom stamp depicting the Big Truth above the Big Lie

The Crusade was launched with a speech by General Eisenhower, who preceded Clay as the military governor of Germany. The speech, given at 11:15PM (EST) on 4 September 1950 (Labor Day), was broadcast to millions of people over all major radio networks. It is now identified by historians as one of the major early public speeches of the Cold War. Eisenhower said:

To destroy human liberty and to control the world, the Communists use every conceivable weapon—subversion, bribery, corruption, military attack! Of all these, none is more insidious than propaganda. Spurred by this threat to our very existence, I speak tonight—as another private citizen, not as an officer of the Army—about the Crusade of freedom. This crusade is a campaign sponsored by private American citizens to fight the big lie with the big truth.

Eisenhower also introduced the concept of the Freedom Scroll:

In this Battle for Truth, you and I have a definite part to play. During the Crusade, each of us will have the opportunity to sign the Freedom Scroll. It bears a declaration of our faith in freedom, and of our belief in the dignity of the individual, who derives the right of freedom from God. Each of us, by signing the Scroll, pledges to resist aggression and tyranny wherever they appear on Earth. Its words express what is in all our hearts. Your signature on it will be a blow for liberty.

The text of Eisenhower's speech appeared in all major newspapers, as well as magazines Time and Newsweek, which received the text in advance for inclusion in the September 4 issue.

=== Freedom Bell ===
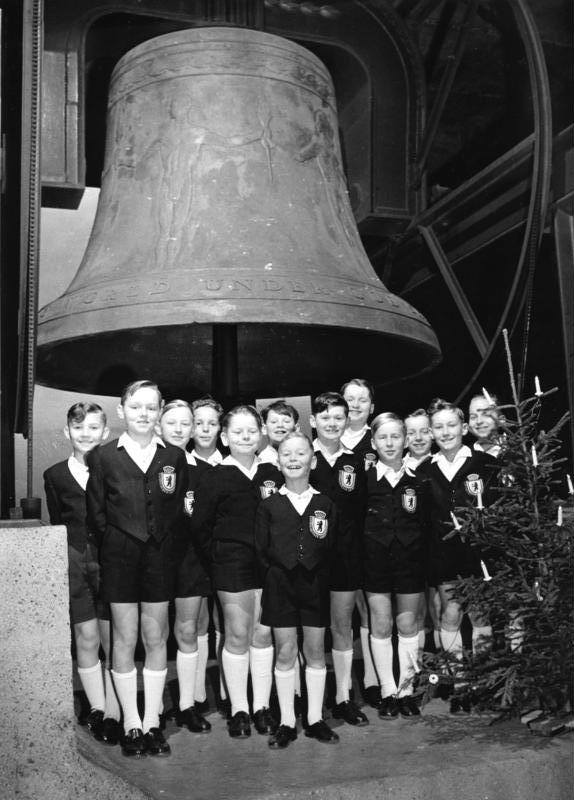
School children pose beneath the massive Freedom Bell in West Berlin in December 1958.

Washburn and Crabtree's Freedom Bell in West Berlin was designed by Walter Dorwin Teague in New York. Written on the bell were words from Abraham Lincoln: "That this world Under God shall have a new birth of freedom."

The bell was created in England and shipped to New York City for a parade following Eisenhower's speech. Traveling by truck, it made a circuit around the country and returned to New York by 8 October. It arrived in West Berlin on 21 October and was officially dedicated by Clay on 24 October 1950.

== Organization ==
Jurisdiction over the Crusade for Freedom was shared among several agencies, and the chain of command was ambiguous. The Psychological Strategy Board assumed ultimate control over the project (along with other propaganda and psychological warfare operations) in May 1952.

Corporate members were many and included Henry Ford II and Gardner Cowles Jr., executive of the Farfield Foundation (another CIA front), donor to the Gardner Cowles Foundation, and sponsor of the journal History. The Crusade also gained the support of religious leaders such as Rabbi Bernard J. Bamberger, president of the Synagogue Council of America, and Archbishop Francis Spellman.

The campaign benefited from the direct collusion of the American media—including The New York Times and the San Francisco Examiner—which knew of its CIA connections but chose not to report them.

=== CIA ===
The CIA provided much of the Crusade for Freedom's funding, spending $5 million in five years (equivalent to upwards of 55 Million in 2023). According to Christopher Simpson's Blowback, the CIA, through the Crusade became the biggest political advertiser in the United States during this period.

The Crusade for Freedom helped to create public legitimacy for ex-Nazis who collaborated with the U.S. government to call for the downfall of the USSR. The CIA also used Crusade for Freedom to send money to this group covertly, by providing funds to a group called the International Refugee.

== Activities in the United States ==
The Crusade for Freedom gained support from hundreds of national and local organizations, conducting a countless array of events across the United States. Some programs were national in scope:

=== Fundraising ===
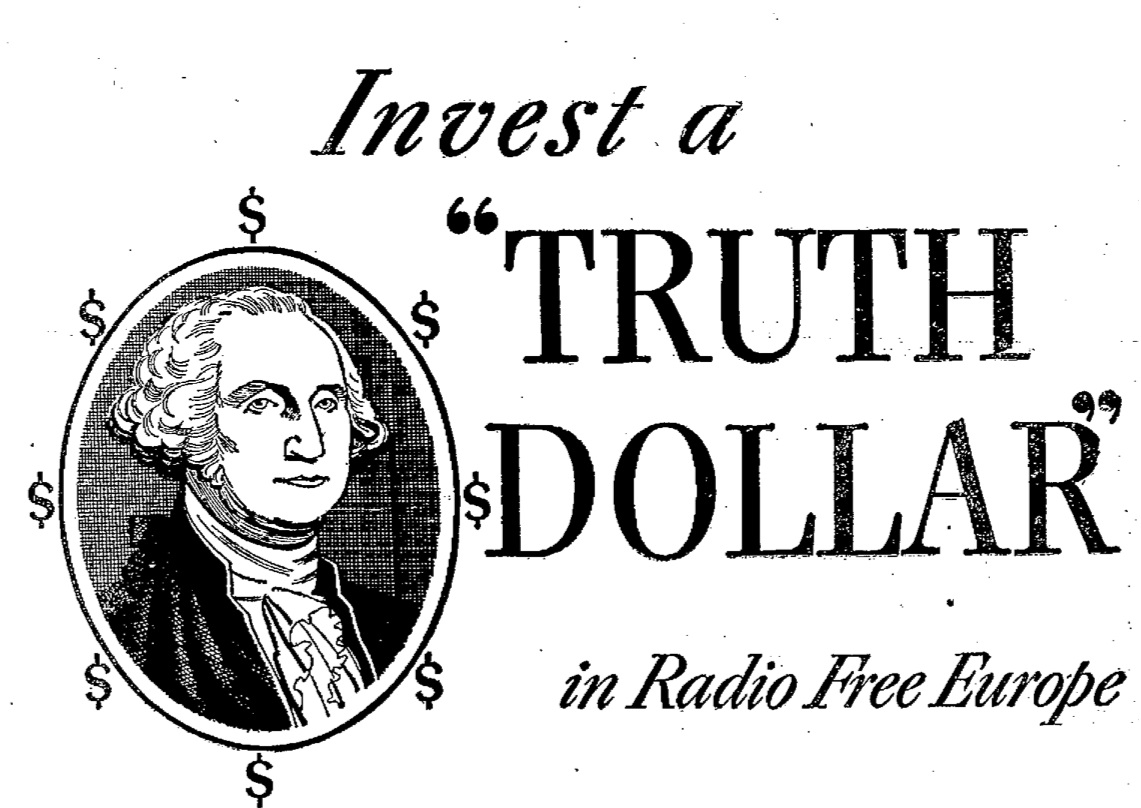
Advertisement urges Americans to donate Truth Dollars. The 1954 fundraising campaign (the Crusade's most successful) used images of George Washington on money as a symbol of American freedom

The official domestic goal of the Crusade for Freedom was to solicit donations from American citizens, and it succeeded in raising $1,317,000 in its first year. However, these funds represented only a small portion of the total amount spent on Radio Free Europe and other propaganda activities.

The Crusade encouraged Americans to donate "Truth Dollars", small donations that confirmed their investment in the project without creating a major financial barrier. The 1954 fundraising campaign (the Crusade's most successful) used images of George Washington on money as a symbol of American freedom.

=== Leaping Lena ===
Leaping Lena was a homing pigeon, reported lost in early August, 1954 during a routine flight in West Germany, and then found again bearing an anti-Communist note signed "Unbowed Pilsen." She was flown to the United States, and treated as a Cold War hero. She was then adopted by Radio Free Europe and the Crusade as a mascot.

=== Freedom Scroll ===
The Crusade for Freedom asked Americans to sign a "Freedom Scroll" with the following text:

In the belief that freedom is the most precious of human rights, I gladly sign my name to this Freedom Scroll as evidence of my participation as a free citizen In the Crusade for Freedom, supporting the National Committee for a Free Europe and its striking arm, Radio Free Europe. In so doing, I join hands with millions of other Americans in bringing truth and hope to the courageous freedom-hungry people behind the Iron Curtain.

Over 16 million people signed the scroll over the course of the campaign.

=== Hollywood ===
The Crusade for Freedom successfully generated American support for Cold War efforts abroad, promoting messages like "Fight the Big Lie with the Big Truth" and "Help Truth Fight Communism". Ronald Reagan was a major US spokesperson for the campaign. Reagan also starred in pro-Crusade film The Big Truth (1951), which depicts RFE broadcasts into Czechoslovakia. Clips of this film were shown as advertisements (produced by the Hearst Corporation and the Advertising Council) for the Crusade for Freedom during the 1951–2 fundraising campaign.

The Crusade also secured the cooperation major Hollywood directors and producers, including Cecil B. DeMille, Darryl F. Zanuck, and particularly Walter Wanger, who became a major booster for the campaign in Los Angeles.

=== Youth Crusade ===
The Crusade organized a half hour radio program, with Bing Crosby and his four sons, called "Youth Crusade with the Crosbys." Crosby asked young people to donate three cents (giving up three sticks of gum) for the sake of freedom in Europe. Wednesday, 3 October 1951, was declared "Youth Crusade Day", and students of all ages listened to the Crosby radio program in their school classrooms.

=== Balloon launches ===
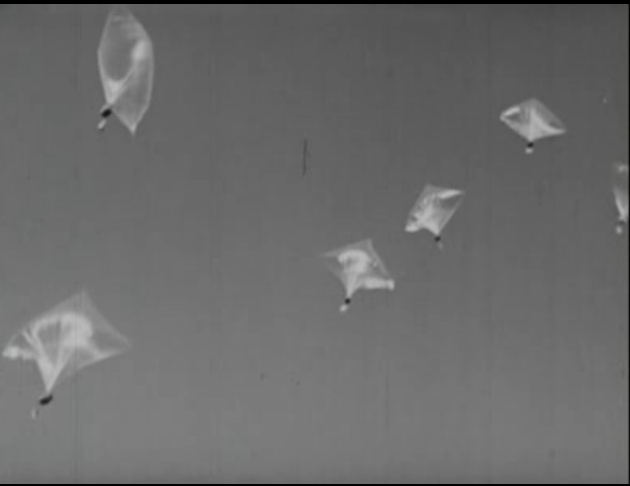
The Fraternal Order of Eagles launched balloons in the U.S. to parallel the balloon messages sent across the Iron Curtain

In 1954, the Fraternal Order of Eagles conducted an "Eagles Flight for Freedom", in which 4,164 helium balloons were dispersed across the United States. These balloons were similar to those being sent across the Iron Curtain into Eastern Europe. They carried leaflets, identification cards, and envelopes for Truth Dollar donations. The finder of the furthest-traveling balloon won a $25 bond, and the whole event was covered by Henry Luce's Life magazine. The Eagles executed similar programs in 1955 and 1956, and also asked respondents to nominate people and organizations for "Freedom Awards".

=== Statement contests ===
The Crusade held statement and essay contests encouraging Americans to draft language for broadcast into Europe. A few of these took place in 1950 and 1951. The concept went into widespread practice in 1958–1959, with the Truth Broadcast contest, which was operated and promoted chiefly by the Advertising Council. Advertisements asked listeners to complete the sentence: "As an American, I support Radio Free Europe because...."

The contest was announced through radio, magazines, newspapers, and journals. It was also promoted in the Educational Edition of Reader's Digest, used in 50% of American High Schools, with an exercise asking students to complete the sentence, imagine their own broadcasts, and answer some questions about Radio Free Europe. Winners flew to Munich and read their entries over the radio.

== Developments ==
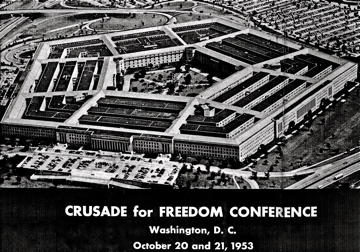
Conference at the Pentagon

The Crusade began a second American campaign, led by Harold Stassen, on Labor Day (3 September) 1951. Eisenhower, now the Supreme Commander of the North Atlantic Treaty Organization gave another speech. These yearly campaigns continued throughout the decade.

In 1952, Clay stepped down as chairman, concerned that the Crusade was becoming "big business" and that large corporate donations would undermine its image. Henry Ford II took over as chairman (he also became chairman of the American Heritage Foundation, which backed the Crusade). Eisenhower (introduced over radio by Ford II) gave his third Crusade for Freedom speech on 11 November 1952—one week after he was elected president. In the same broadcast, listeners heard the defeated Adlai Stevenson also express his support for the Crusade, stating: "The programs have a spontaneity and freshness, which no official information agency can have. Freedom speaks most clearly between man and man, when its voice is neither muffled nor amplified by government intervention nor other official trappings." (Eisenhower had reportedly been prepared to order leaflet drops over immigrant communities such as Hamtramck blaming Stevenson for "betraying" the liberation agenda in Eastern Europe.)

== See also ==
- Astroturfing
- Charles Douglas (C. D.) Jackson
- CIA influence on public opinion
- Church Committee
- Operation Mockingbird
- Radio Free Asia
