= Funded by the CIA =

Funded by the CIA can be related to any of the following articles:

- CIA black sites
- CIA influence on public opinion
- CIA drug trafficking allegations
- Cultural Cold War
- In-Q-Tel is an independent American not-for-profit venture capital firm funded primarily through contracts with the CIA
- United States involvement in regime change
- United States involvement in regime change in Latin America, especially during the Cold War (1947–1991)
  - School of the Americas
