= Ich bin ein Berliner =

1963 speech by U.S. President John F. Kennedy in West Berlin

Coordinates: 52.484932°N 13.344395°E

- Video of President John F. Kennedy delivering the historic speech from the balcony of West Berlin's city hall on June 26, 1963.
- Date: June 26, 1963
- Location: Rathaus Schöneberg, West Berlin
- Participants: John F. Kennedy; Robert F. Kennedy; Willy Brandt (Mayor of West Berlin); Konrad Adenauer (Chancellor of West Germany)
- Outcome: Widespread boost to West Berlin public morale Solidified U.S. Cold War commitment to Europe; Became one of Kennedy's most defining rhetorical legacies

"Ich bin ein Berliner" (German pronunciation: [ɪç bɪn ʔaɪn bɛʁˈliːnɐ]; "I Am a Berliner") is a speech by United States president John F. Kennedy given on June 26, 1963, in West Berlin. It is one of the best-known speeches of the Cold War and among the most famous anti-communist speeches. The speech is considered one of Kennedy's finest, delivered at the height of the Cold War and the New Frontier.

Twenty-two months earlier, East Germany had erected the Berlin Wall to prevent mass emigration to West Berlin. The speech was aimed as much at the Soviet Union as it was at West Berliners. Another phrase in the speech was also spoken in German, "Lasst sie nach Berlin kommen" ("Let them come to Berlin"), addressed at those who claimed "we can work with the Communists", a remark at which Nikita Khrushchev scoffed only days later.

Speaking to an audience of 120,000 on the steps of Rathaus Schöneberg, Kennedy said,

Two thousand years ago, the proudest boast was civis Romanus sum ["I am a Roman citizen"]. Today, in the world of freedom, the proudest boast is "Ich bin ein Berliner!"... All free men, wherever they may live, are citizens of Berlin, and therefore, as a free man, I take pride in the words "Ich bin ein Berliner!"

For decades, competing claims about the origins of the "Ich bin ein Berliner" overshadowed the history of the speech. In 2008, historian Andreas Daum provided a comprehensive explanation, based on archival sources and interviews with contemporaries and witnesses. He highlighted the authorship of Kennedy himself and his 1962 speech in New Orleans as a precedent, and demonstrated that by straying from the prepared script in Berlin, Kennedy created the climax of an emotionally charged political performance, which became a hallmark of the Cold War epoch.

There is a widespread misconception that Kennedy accidentally said that he was a Berliner, a type of German doughnut. This is an urban legend which emerged two decades after the speech, and it is not true that residents of Berlin in 1963 would have mainly understood the word "Berliner" to refer to a jelly doughnut or that the audience laughed at Kennedy's use of this expression – if nothing else because this type of doughnut is called "Pfannkuchen" (literally: Pan cake) in Berlin and the word "Berliner" is only used outside Berlin.

== Background ==
The four sectors of Berlin

Germany's capital, Berlin, was deep within the area controlled by the Soviet Union after World War II. Initially governed in four sectors controlled by the four Allied powers (United States, United Kingdom, France and the Soviet Union), tensions of the Cold War escalated until the Soviet forces implemented the Berlin Blockade of the city's western sectors, which the Western allies relieved with the dramatic airlift. Afterward, the sectors controlled by the NATO Allies became an effective exclave of West Germany, completely surrounded by East Germany. Starting in 1952, the border between East and West was closed everywhere but in Berlin. Hundreds of thousands of East Germans defected to the West via West Berlin, a labour drain that threatened East Germany with economic collapse.

In 1961, the East German government under Walter Ulbricht erected a barbed-wire barrier around West Berlin, officially called the antifaschistischer Schutzwall (anti-fascist protective barrier). The East German authorities argued that it was meant to prevent spies and agents of West Germany from crossing into the East. However, it was universally known as the Berlin Wall and its main purpose was to keep East German citizens from escaping to the West. Over a period of months the wall was rebuilt using concrete, and buildings were demolished to create a "death zone" in view of East German guards armed with machine guns. The Wall closed the biggest loophole in the Iron Curtain, and Berlin went from being one of the easiest places to cross from East Europe to West Europe to being one of the most difficult.

The West, including the U.S., was accused of failing to respond forcefully to the erection of the Wall. Officially, Berlin was under joint occupation by the four allied powers, each with primary responsibility for a certain zone. Kennedy's speech marked the first instance where the U.S. acknowledged that East Berlin was part of the Soviet bloc along with the rest of East Germany. On July 25, 1961, Kennedy insisted in a presidential address that the U.S. would defend West Berlin, asserting its Four-Power rights, while making it clear that challenging the Soviet presence in Germany was not possible.

== Genesis and execution of the speech ==
=== Origins ===
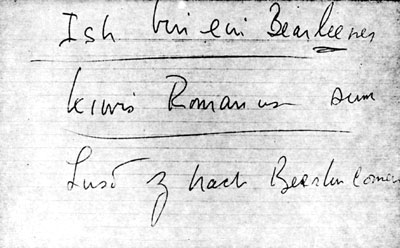
John F. Kennedy's phonetic transcription of the German and Latin phrases in the Ich bin ein Berliner speech

The Ich bin ein Berliner speech is in part derived from a speech Kennedy gave at a Civic Reception on May 4, 1962, in New Orleans; there also he used the phrase civis Romanus sum by saying,

Two thousand years ago the proudest boast was to say, "I am a citizen of Rome." Today, I believe, in 1962 the proudest boast is to say, "I am a citizen of the United States." And it is not enough to merely say it; we must live it. Anyone can say it. But Americans who serve today in West Berlin—your sons and brothers—[...] are the Americans who are bearing the great burden.

The phrases "I am a Berliner" and "I am proud to be in Berlin" were typed already a week before the speech on a list of expressions to be used, including a phonetic transcription of the German translation. Such transcriptions are also found in the third draft of the speech (in Kennedy's own handwriting), from June 25. The final typed version of the speech does not contain the transcriptions, which are added by hand by Kennedy himself.

In practice sessions before the trip, Kennedy had run through a number of sentences, even paragraphs, to recite in German; in these sessions, he was helped by Margaret Plischke, a translator working for the US State Department; by Ted Sorensen, Kennedy's counsel and habitual speechwriter; and by an interpreter, Robert Lochner, who had grown up in Berlin. It became clear quickly that the president did not have a gift for languages and was more likely to embarrass himself if he were to cite in German for any length.

But there are differing accounts on the origin of the phrase Ich bin ein Berliner. Plischke wrote a 1997 account of visiting Kennedy at the White House weeks before the trip to help compose the speech and teach him the proper pronunciation; she also claims that the phrase had been translated stateside already by the translator scheduled to accompany him on the trip ("a rather unpleasant man who complained bitterly that he had had to interrupt his vacation just to watch the President’s mannerisms"). Additionally, Ted Sorensen claimed in his memoir Counselor: A Life at the Edge of History (2008) to have had a hand in the speech, and said he had incorrectly inserted the word ein, thereby causing the "jelly doughnut misconception", below. Sorenson's claim was apparently supported by Berlin mayor Willy Brandt but was dismissed by later scholars since the final typed version, which does not contain the words, is the last one Sorensen could have worked on. Robert Lochner claimed in his memoirs that Kennedy had asked him for a translation of "I am a Berliner", and that they practiced the phrase in Brandt's office. Daum credited the origin of the phrase Ich bin ein Berliner to Kennedy and his 1962 speech in New Orleans quoted above. According to Daum, Kennedy was affected by seeing the Berlin Wall, so that he "falls back on the most memorable passage of his New Orleans speech given the year before, changing pride in being an American in being a Berliner."

=== Delivery ===
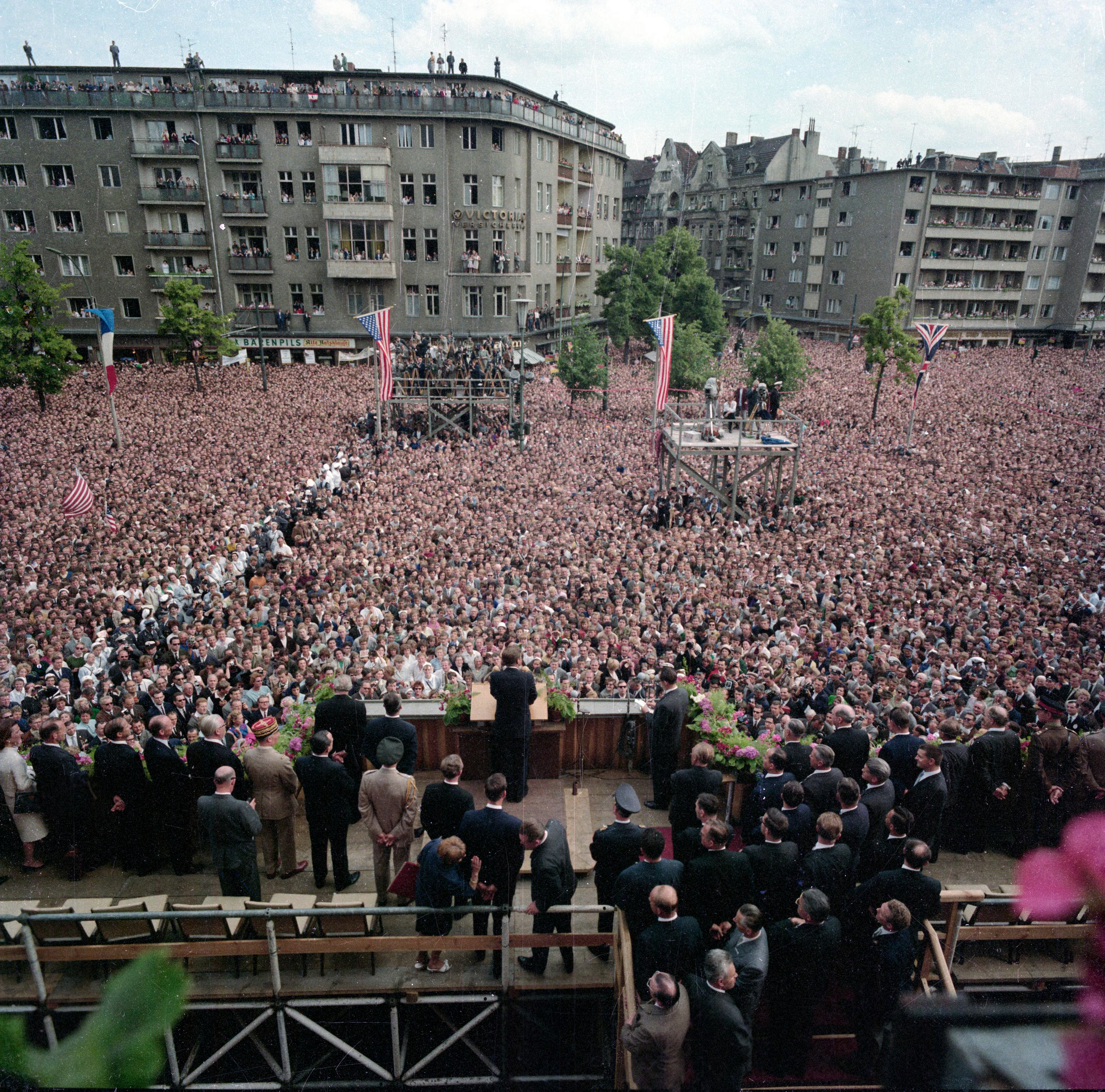
Kennedy delivering his speech in Berlin

Behind the long table set up on the steps of the Rathaus Schöneberg were U.S. and German dignitaries, including Dean Rusk (Kennedy's Secretary of State), Lucius D. Clay (the former US administrator of Germany), Konrad Adenauer (the German chancellor), Willy Brandt, the Mayor of Berlin and Otto Bach (President of the Abgeordnetenhaus of Berlin). The crowd was estimated at 120,000 people. Bach spoke first, of the recent developments in Berlin, especially the wall. He was followed by Konrad Adenauer, who spoke briefly and introduced the president.

Kennedy was accompanied not by Robert Lochner, but by Heinz Weber of the Berlin mission; Weber translated the president's speech to the audience. Besides the typescript, Kennedy had a cue card on which he himself had written the phonetic spelling, and he surprised everyone by completely disregarding the speech, which had taken weeks to prepare. Instead, he improvised: "He says more than he should, something different from what his advisers had recommended, and is more provocative than he had intended to be."

The speech culminated with the second use in the speech of the Ich bin ein Berliner phrase:

Two thousand years ago, the proudest boast was civis Romanus sum ["I am a Roman citizen"]. Today, in the world of freedom, the proudest boast is "Ich bin ein Berliner!"... All free men, wherever they may live, are citizens of Berlin, and therefore, as a free man, I take pride in the words "Ich bin ein Berliner!"

The crowd was quiet while Weber translated and repeated the president's German line; Kennedy was obviously relieved at the crowd's positive response and thanked Weber for his translation. Weber translated this compliment also. According to Daum, after this first successful delivery, "Kennedy, who fiddles a bit with his suit jacket, is grinning like a boy who has just pulled off a coup."

Kennedy's National Security Advisor McGeorge Bundy thought the speech had gone "a little too far", and the two revised the text of a second major speech scheduled at the Freie Universität Berlin later that day for a softer stance which "amounted to being a bit more conciliatory toward the Soviets."

In his notes, Kennedy had written out "ish bin ein Bearleener", using English orthography to approximate the German pronunciation – his actual pronunciation though is fairly close to correct German and much better than how he is usually quoted. He also used the classical Latin pronunciation of civis romanus sum, with the c pronounced [k] and the v as [w] (i.e. "kiwis romanus sum").

== Consequences and legacy ==
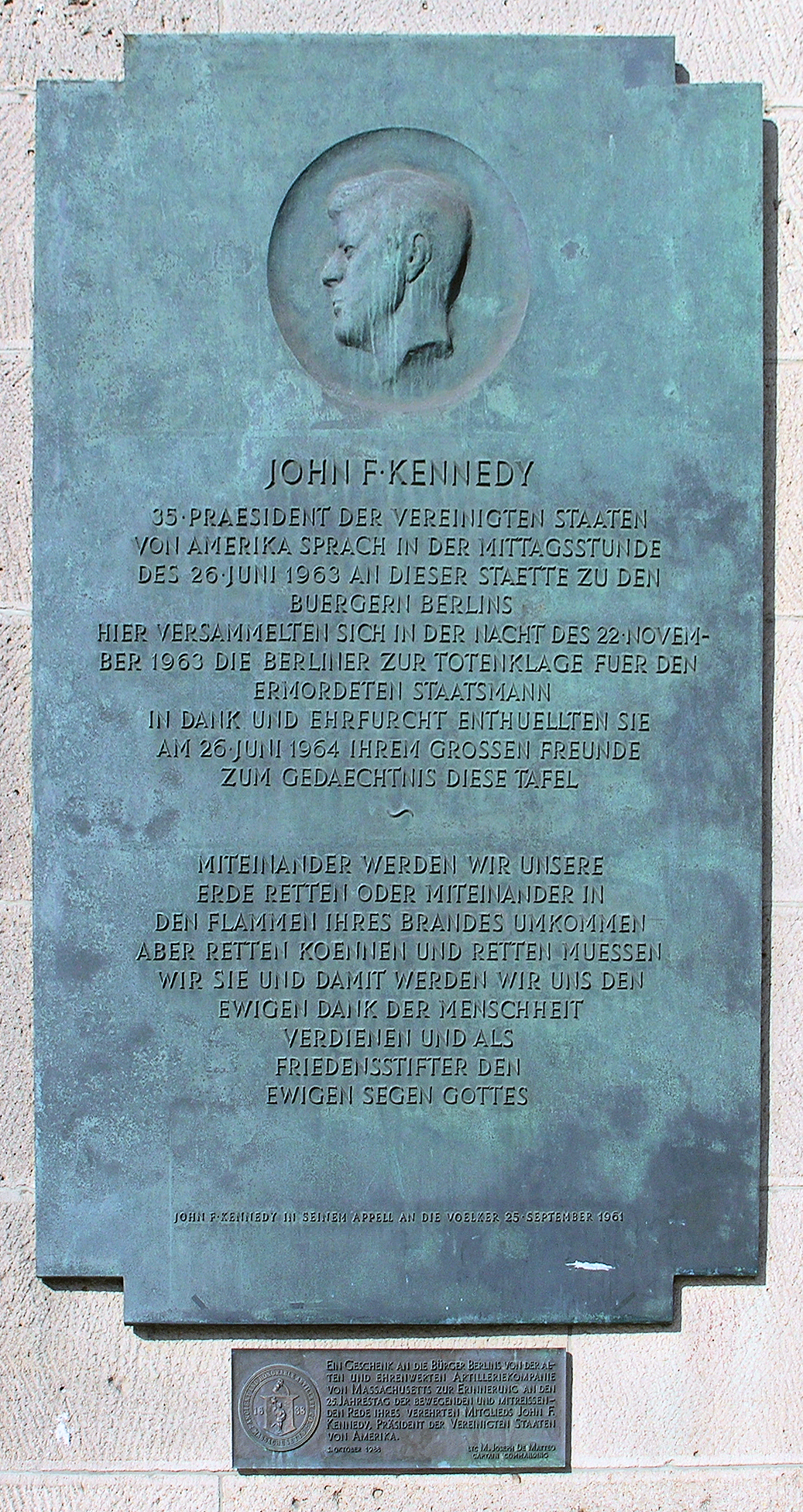
Plaque commemorating Kennedy's speech next to the front entrance of Rathaus Schöneberg

While the immediate response from the West German population was positive, the Soviet authorities were less pleased with the combative Lasst sie nach Berlin kommen. ("Let them come to Berlin.") Only two weeks before, in his American University speech (formally titled "A Strategy of Peace"), Kennedy had spoken in a more conciliatory tone, speaking of "improving relations with the Soviet Union": in response to Kennedy's Berlin speech, Nikita Khrushchev, days later, remarked that "one would think that the speeches were made by two different presidents."

Ronald Reagan would evoke both the sentiment and the legacy of Kennedy's speech 24 years later in his "Tear down this wall!" speech.

In 1994, then president Bill Clinton made a speech also reminiscent to Kennedy's referencing the relatively recent German reunification, using a German phrase as well, boasting "Berlin ist frei" (meaning "Berlin is free").

There are commemorative sites to Kennedy in Berlin, such as the German-American John F. Kennedy School and the John F. Kennedy-Institute for North American Studies of the FU Berlin. The public square in front of the Rathaus Schöneberg was renamed John-F.-Kennedy-Platz. A large plaque dedicated to Kennedy is mounted on a column at the entrance of the building and the room above the entrance and overlooking the square is dedicated to Kennedy and his visit. A video of Kennedy delivering the speech plays as part of the main exhibit at the Checkpoint Charlie Museum.

The original manuscript of the speech is stored with the National Archives and Records Administration.

== Urban legend ==
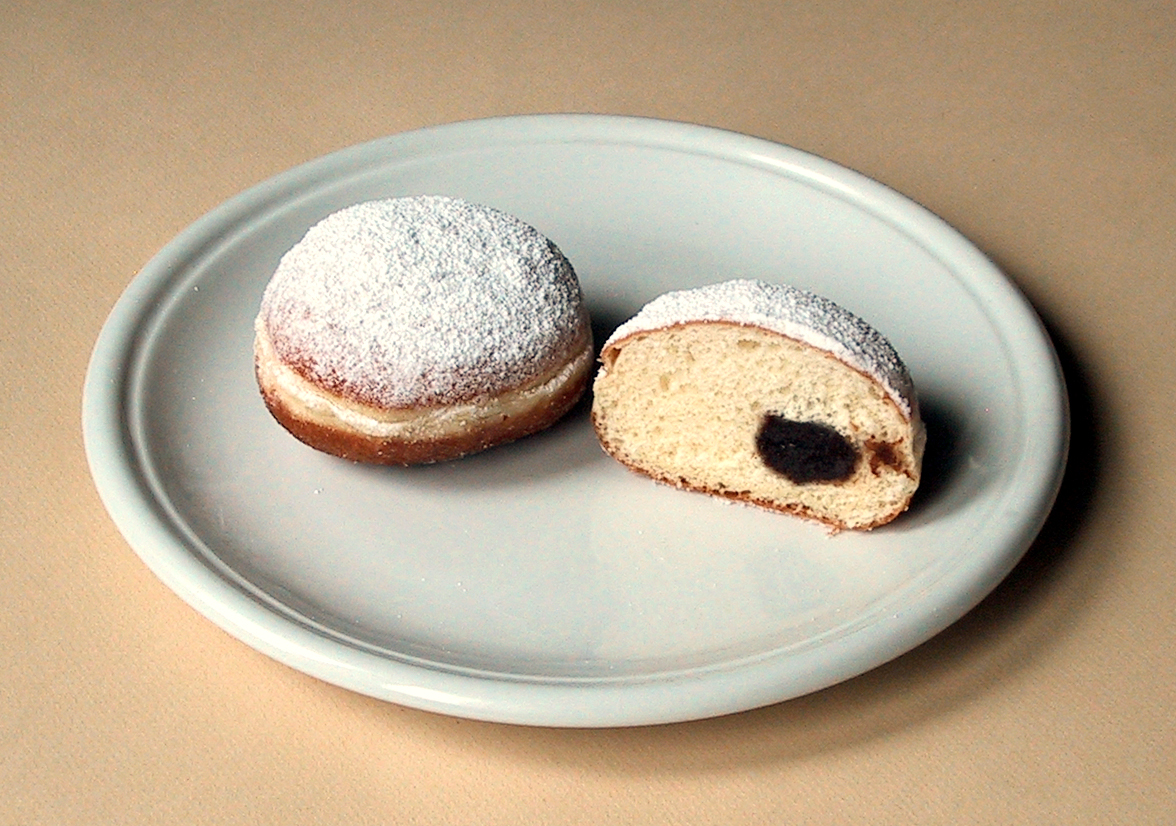
Berliner with plum jam filling

There is a widespread false belief that Kennedy made a mistake by saying Ich bin ein Berliner. By including the indefinite article ein, he supposedly changed the meaning of the sentence from the intended "I am a citizen of Berlin" to "I am a Berliner" (a Berliner being a type of German pastry, similar to a jam- or jelly-filled doughnut), amusing Germans throughout the city. However, this is incorrect from both a grammatical and historical perspective.

While the phrase "Ich bin ein Berliner" can be understood as having a double meaning, it is not incorrect to use it the way Kennedy did. The indefinite article ein can be omitted in German when speaking of an individual's profession or origin but is used in any case when speaking in a figurative sense. Furthermore, although the word "Berliner" is used for a doughnut filled with fruit jam or jelly in the north, west, and southwest of Germany, this use of the word is not traditional to the dialects of Berlin or the surrounding regions, where the usual word is Pfannkuchen (literally "pancake").

A further part of the misconception is that the audience to his speech laughed at his supposed error. The laughter from the crowd came a few seconds after the first use of the phrase when Kennedy joked with the interpreter: "I appreciate my interpreter translating my German."

The misconception appears to have originated in Len Deighton's 1983 spy novel Berlin Game, which contains the following passage, spoken by Bernard Samson:

'Ich bin ein Berliner,' I said. It was a joke. A Berliner is a doughnut. The day after President Kennedy made his famous proclamation, Berlin cartoonists had a field day with talking doughnuts.

In Deighton's novel, Samson is an unreliable narrator, and his words cannot be taken at face value. However, The New York Times' review of Deighton's novel appeared to treat Samson's remark as factual and added the detail that Kennedy's audience found his remark funny:

Here is where President Kennedy announced, Ich bin ein Berliner, and thereby amused the city's populace because in the local parlance a Berliner is a doughnut.

Four years later, it found its way into a New York Times op-ed:

It's worth recalling, again, President John F. Kennedy's use of a German phrase while standing before the Berlin Wall. It would be great, his wordsmiths thought, for him to declare himself a symbolic citizen of Berlin. Hence, Ich bin ein Berliner. What they did not know, but could easily have found out, was that such citizens never refer to themselves as 'Berliners.' They reserve that term for a favorite confection often munched at breakfast. So, while they understood and appreciated the sentiments behind the President's impassioned declaration, the residents tittered among themselves when he exclaimed, literally, "I am a jelly-filled doughnut."

The doughnut misconception has since been repeated by media such as the BBC (by Alistair Cooke in his Letter from America program), The Guardian, MSNBC, CNN, Time magazine, and The New York Times; mentioned in several books about Germany written by English-speaking authors, including Norman Davies and Kenneth C. Davis; and used in the manual for the Speech Synthesis Markup Language. It is also mentioned in Robert Dallek's 2003 biography of Kennedy, An Unfinished Life: John F. Kennedy, 1917–1963. In her book on the history of Berlin, historian Mary Fulbrook repeated the myth that Kennedy called himself a jelly doughnut and that his audience laughed.

Another reference to this misconception appears in David Foster Wallace's 1996 novel Infinite Jest, which contains the following passage:

Few foreigners realize that the German term Berliner is also the vulgate idiom for a common jelly doughnut, and thus that Kennedy's seminal 'Ich bin ein Berliner' was greeted by the Teutonic crowds with a delight only apparently political.

In the Discworld novel Monstrous Regiment by Terry Pratchett, special envoy Sam Vimes, tasked with ending a war between the bellicose nation of Borogravia and an alliance of its aggrieved neighbours, intended to express his support for Borogravia by saying "I am a citizen of Borogravia" in its native language. However, Polly Perks, the main character, corrects him, saying he called himself a cherry pancake.

The stand-up comedy tour Dress to Kill by comedian Eddie Izzard also mentioned Kennedy's speech, speculating the German audience thought it must just be American slang, for an American. Izzard further imagines Kennedy undertaking a tour of other German cities with names connected with food, introducing himself as a "hamburger" and a "frankfurter".

The jelly doughnut myth was largely unknown to Germans until the social web enhanced cross-cultural exchange in the 2000s. At the death of Robert Lochner in September 2003, German media retold the story on the creation of Kennedy's phrase without mentioning the myth, while on the same occasion English language media still added the myth as fact, as for example the New York Times informed by Associated Press. The German Historical Museum in Berlin opened an exhibition in 2003 without providing a hint to the myth either. The Kennedy Museum in Berlin picked up the story in November 2008, debunking the myth, while an English article in Spiegel International about the opening of the museum in 2006 did quote the myth as fact. A reference to the myth in the national newspaper Die Welt in July 2008 shows that the knowledge about the misconception in the US was well understood by then.

== See also ==
- Je suis Charlie
