= Franz Eichhorst =

20th century German painter (1885–1948)

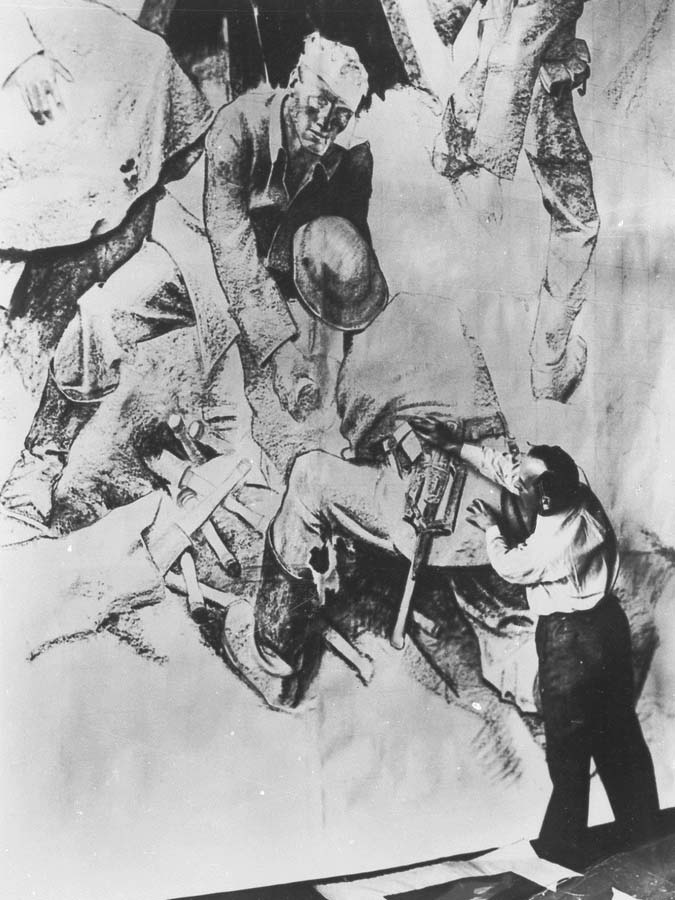
Franz Eichhorst at work with his war frescos for Schöneberg City hall in Berlin, 1935–1938. The Nazi propaganda murals were painted over at the end of World War II. Photo: Dorneth, 1936

Franz Eichhorst (Berlin 7 September 1885 – 30 April 1948 Innsbruck) was a German painter, engraver and illustrator, one of a number of German artists known for his war paintings supporting the Nazi regime.

Eichhorst volunteered for military service for Germany in World War I. In the early 1920s, Eichhorst set up a summer studio in Matrei in Osttirol. There in 1928, he created one of his most well-known works, Mädchen mit Krug (Girl with Pitcher).

In 1938 he created a series of war and Nazi propaganda murals representing the last 25 years of German history for the Schöneberg city hall in Berlin; these were repainted and deleted at the end of World War II in May 1945. In April 1938, Adolf Hitler bestowed upon him the honorary title of Professor. Over 50 of his paintings were displayed at the Great German art exhibition (Große Deutsche Kunstausstellung) at the then Haus der deutschen Kunst in Munich, including battle scenes from the Second World War, particularly those from the conflicts with Poland and Russia.

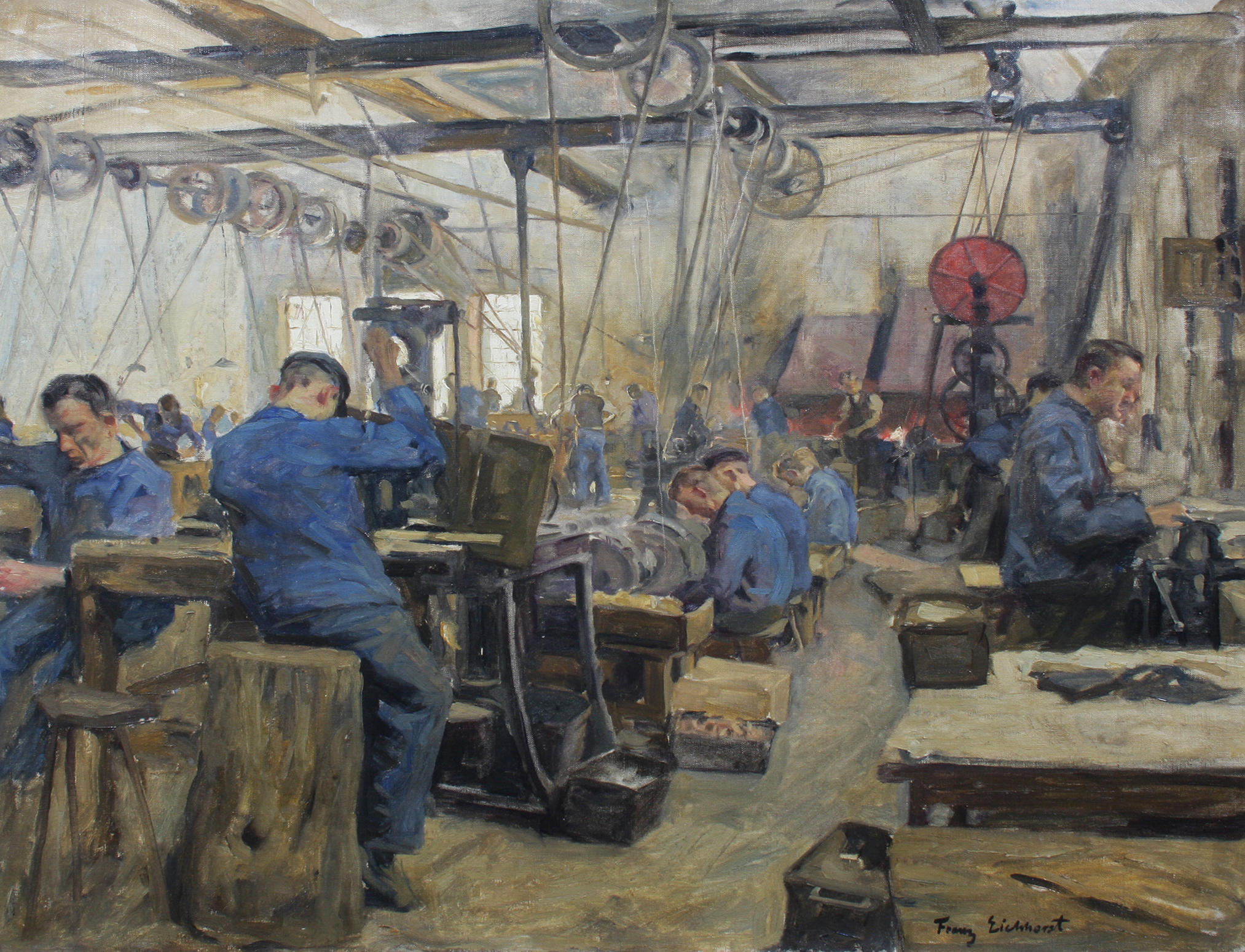
"Lathe workers". Oil on paper, 59 x 70 cm.

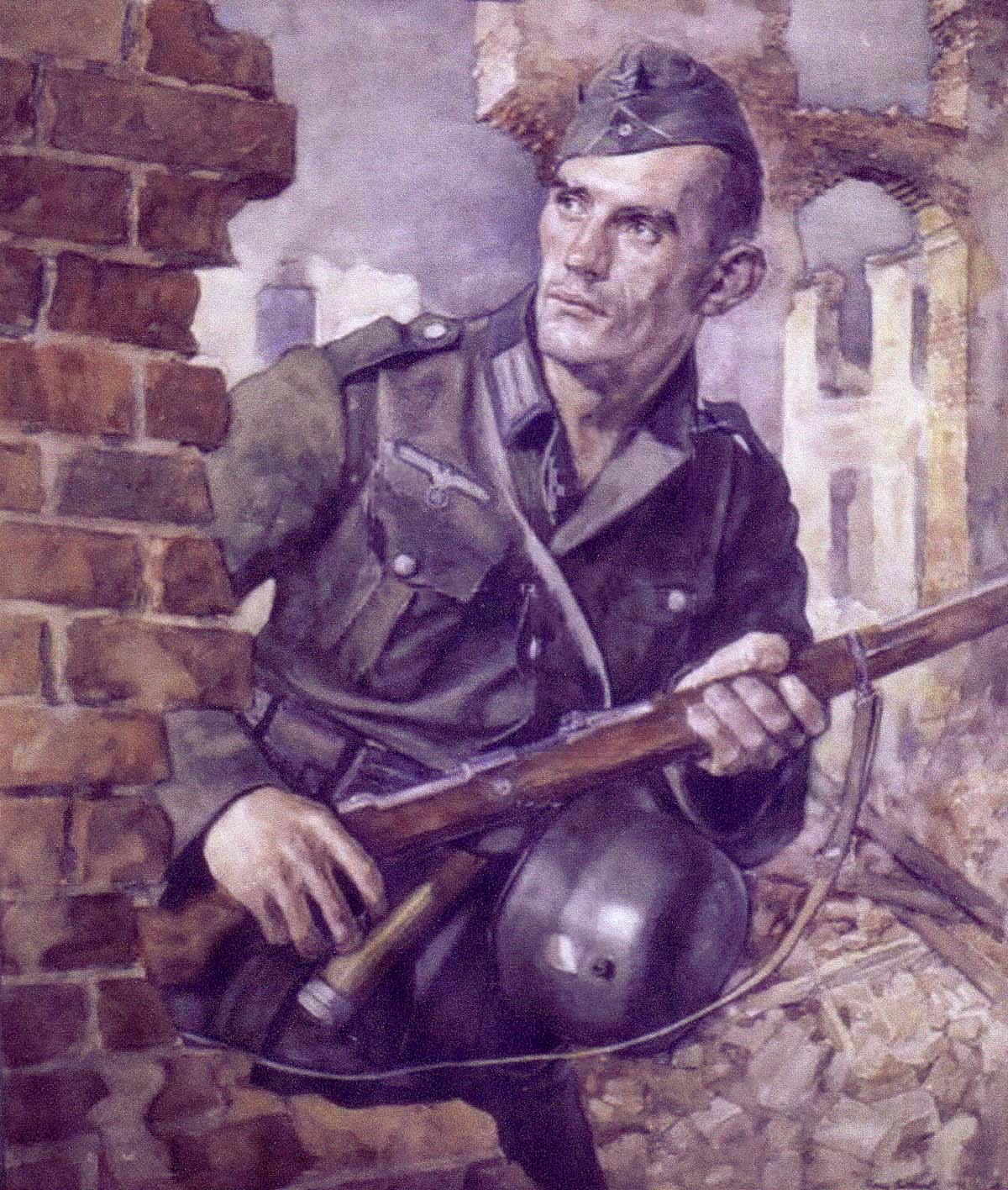
"Poland fighter", propaganda painting of a Wehrmacht soldier, 1940

== See also ==
- List of German painters

== Bibliography ==
- Julius Redzinski, Erinnerung an Stalingrad. Franz Eichhorst as a War Artist in the Nazi Era, in: Meike Hoffmann, Dieter Scholz (ed.), Unmastered Past? Modernism in Nazi Germany. Art, Art Trade, Curatorial Practice, Verbrecher Verlag, Berlin 2020, ISBN 978-3-95732-453-5, p. 112–131.
- Julius Redzinski, Von der Frontgemeinschaft zur Volksgemeinschaft. Franz Eichhorsts Freskenzyklus im Rathaus von Berlin-Schöneberg und im Kontext der nationaloszialistischen Interpretation des Ersten Weltkriegs, in: Iris Wenderholm, Nereida Gyllensvärd und Robin Augenstein (ed.), Die Sichtbarkeit der Idee. Zur Übertragung soziopolitischer Konzepte in Kunst und Kulturwissenschaften, De Gruyter, Berlin 2023, ISBN 978-3-11075-637-1, p. 109–128.
- Hans Rosenhagen, Franz Eichhorst, in: Velhagen & Klasings Monatshefte, Vol. 35, No. 12 (1921), p. 545–560.
