= Leaping Lena =

West German racing pigeon

- Leaping Lena arriving in New York
- Species: Columba livia
- Breed: Racing pigeon
- Sex: female
- Nationality: West Germany
- Occupation: Racing pigeon / Cold War hero
- Employer: Radio Free Europe
- Notable role: mascot
- Years active: 1954–1955
- Known for: bearing an anti-communist message

Leaping Lena was a West German racing pigeon who got lost in Czechoslovakia during a routine 1954 flight. When she returned home two days later, there was a message addressed to Radio Free Europe attached to one of her legs. It read:

We plead with you not to slow down in the fight against communism because communism must be destroyed. We beg for a speedy liberation from the power of the Kremlin and the establishment of a United States of Europe.
We listen to your broadcasts. They present a completely true picture of life behind the Iron Curtain. We would like you to tell us how we can combat bolshevism and the tyrannical dictatorship existing here.
We are taking every opportunity to work against the regime and do everything in our power to sabotage it.

It was signed "Unbowed Pilsen."

Leaping Lena was brought to the United States in August 1954, quarantined for 3 weeks, and then was used to raise money for Radio Free Europe as part of a publicity campaign for the Crusade for Freedom, a front organization used by the CIA.

Leaping Lena was then kept at Fort Monmouth's Pigeon Breeding and Training Center. When the Center was deactivated in 1957, fifteen hero pigeons were donated to zoos, while about a thousand others were sold to the public.
