= Schöneberg Town Hall =

City hall in Schöneberg, Berlin, Germany

- Rathaus Schöneberg
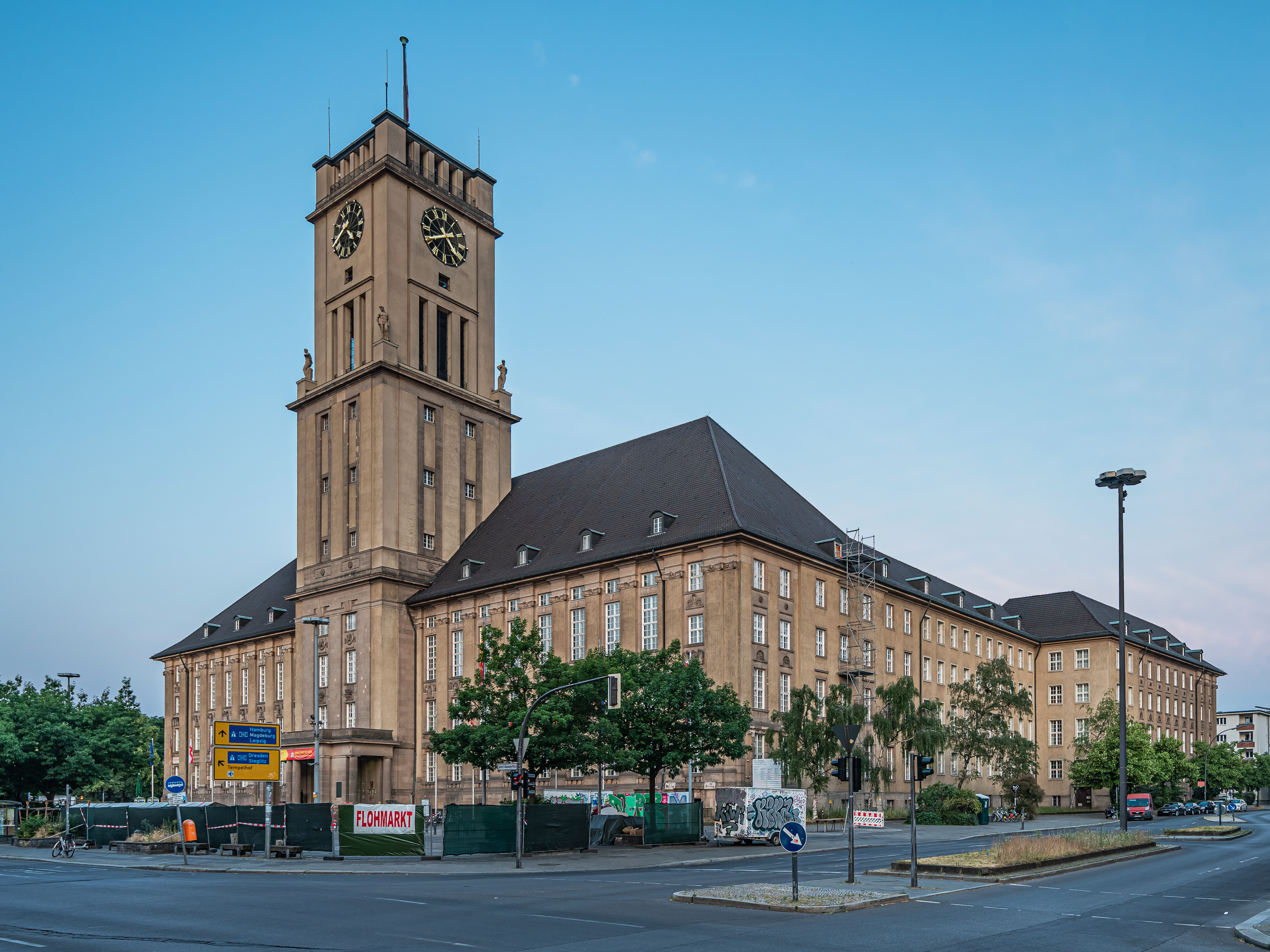
- The main frontage of the town hall in June 2021

General information
- Type: City hall
- Architectural style: Baroque Revival style
- Location: Tempelhof-Schöneberg, Berlin, Germany
- Coordinates: 52.4849°N 13.3440°E
- Construction started: 1911
- Completed: 1914

Height
- Height: 70 metres (230 ft)

Design and construction
- Architects: Peter Jürgensen and Jürgen Bachmann

Schöneberg Town Hall (German: Rathaus Schöneberg) is a municipal building in Tempelhof-Schöneberg, Berlin, in eastern Germany, standing on John-F.-Kennedy-Platz. It accommodated the office of the Governing Mayor of Berlin and the Berlin House of Representatives during the division of Germany and is now the town hall for the borough of Tempelhof-Schöneberg.

== History ==
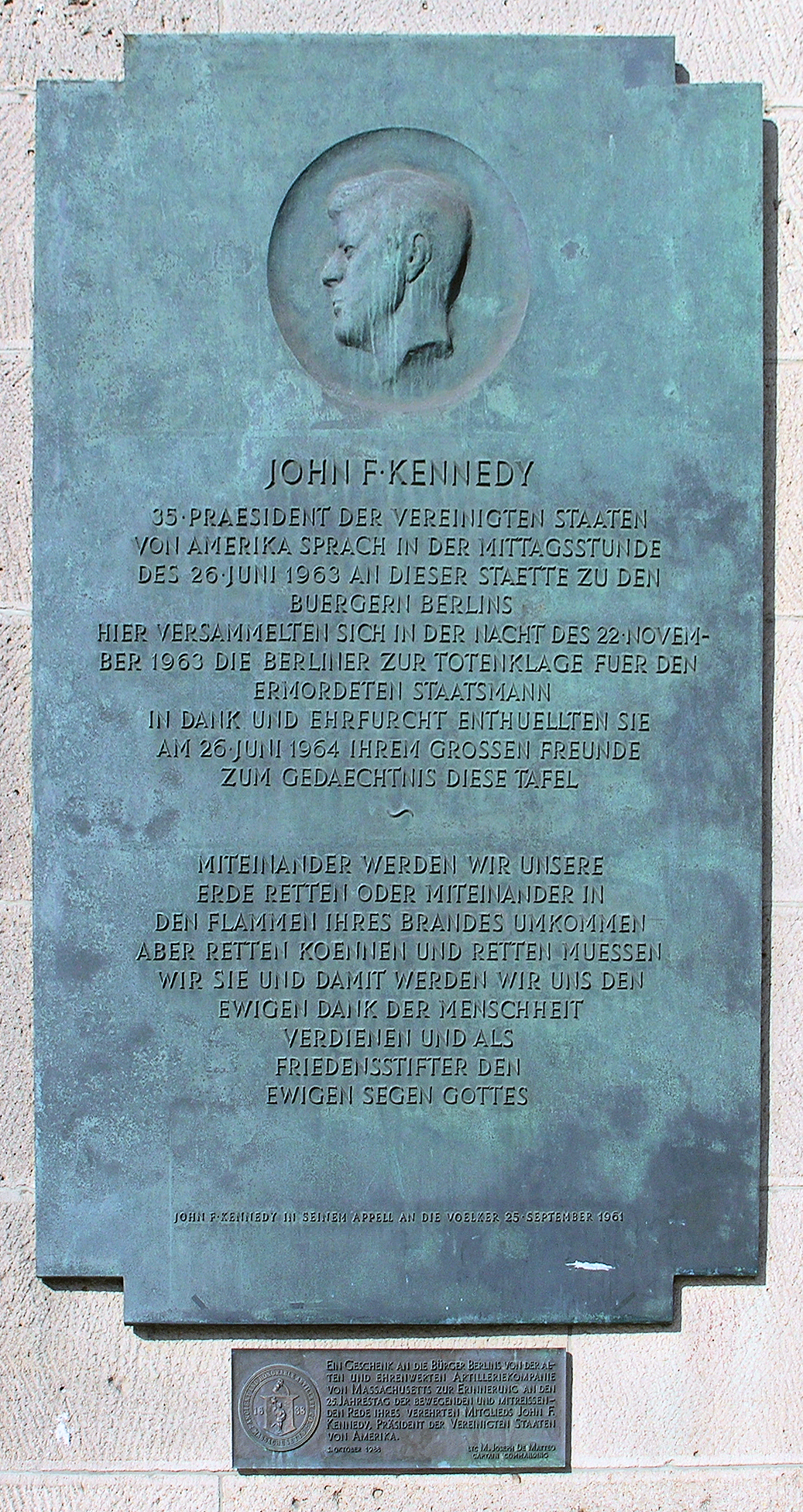
Plaque memorializing John F. Kennedy

Ich bin ein Berliner (I am a Berliner) speech
"Ich bin ein Berliner" speech from Schöneberg Town Hall by John F. Kennedy, 26 June 1963. Duration 9:01.

Ich bin ein Berliner (I am a Berliner) speech (audio)
Audio-only version (Duration 9:22)

In the mid-19th century, the town council of Schöneberg met in the home of the mayor at the time. This arrangement continued until 1874, when the council established a municipal office on Bahnstraße (now Richard-von-Weizsäcker-Platz). In the late 19th century, the council commissioned a more substantial building on an adjacent site. It was designed by Friedrich Schulze in the Renaissance Revival style, built in red brick and was completed in 1892. It was a four-storey building with two gabled projections and a lantern.

In the early 20th century, after finding the old town hall cramped, the council led by the mayor, Alexander Dominicus, decided to commission a larger building. The site they selected had been occupied by a private house known as the "Rosenkessel'sche Grundstück" (Rosenkessel Property). The square in front of the proposed building was named Rudolph-Wilde-Platz to commemorate the life of the former mayor, Rudolph Wilde. The foundation stone for the new building was laid on 26 May 1911. It was designed by Peter Jürgensen and Jürgen Bachmann in the Baroque Revival style, built in sandstone and was completed in 1914.

The design involved a symmetrical main frontage of 20 bays facing onto the street with the central two bays projected forward to form a four-stage tower. The first stage, which spanned three floors, featured a portico formed by two pairs of Doric order columns supporting an entablature on the ground floor, and pairs of tall casement windows on the first and second floor. The second stage was fenestrated by three pairs of small square windows, while the third stage involved three tall openings surmounted by a clock, and the fourth stage incorporated five narrow openings surmounted by a flat roof. The tower was 70 metres (230 ft) high. The wings were also fenestrated by tall casement windows.

Schöneberg, which at the time of construction of the building had been an independent city (German: Stadtkreis), was incorporated into Greater Berlin, in 1920. The Nazi authorities had a series of war murals by Franz Eichhorst added to the interior in 1938.

The building was heavily damaged by the allied bombing of Berlin in the Second World War and restored to the original plans in the late 1940s. A commercial building commissioned in 1930s to accommodate the municipal fire insurance company, Feuersozietät, served as the municipal offices for Berlin until 1955. However, from then, the Schöneberg Town Hall served as the town hall for West Berlin, while the Red Town Hall, located in the Soviet sector, served as the town hall for East Berlin. In 1950 the Freedom Bell (Freiheitsglocke), a gift by the United States, was installed in the rebuilt tower.

During the Berlin Blockade, the Uprising of 1953, and the Hungarian Revolution of 1956, the square in front of the building became a gathering place for protest rallies. After the construction of the Berlin Wall in 1961, the steps of Schöneberg Town Hall were the location where U.S. President John F. Kennedy spoke on 26 June 1963, proclaiming "Ich bin ein Berliner". On the night of his assassination, several thousand Berliners spontaneously gathered at the square, which was officially renamed John-F.-Kennedy-Platz three days later. There was a large assembly in front of the building on 10 November 1989, the day after the fall of the Berlin Wall. Prominent people attending were chancellor Helmut Kohl, former chancellor Willy Brandt, and foreign minister Hans-Dietrich Genscher.

After reunification, Schöneberg Town Hall reverted to its original purpose of being the town hall for the Borough of Schöneberg and, following the 2001 Berlin administrative reform, it became the town hall for the newly constituted borough of Tempelhof-Schöneberg. In 2005, an exhibition called Wir waren Nachbarn – Biografien jüdischer Zeitzeugen (English title:We were Neighbours once – Biographies of Jews in Schöneberg and Tempelhof under the Nazi Regime) was established in the exhibition hall of the building.
