= Friedrich Schulze (architect) =

German architect and Prussian master of works

Friedrich Schulze, Friedrich Schulze-Colbitz or Friedrich Schulze-Kolbitz (8 or 18 March 1843 in Colbitz – 30 July 1912 in Steglitz near Berlin; full name: Johann David Friedrich Otto Schulze) was a German architect and Prussian master of works.

== Biography ==
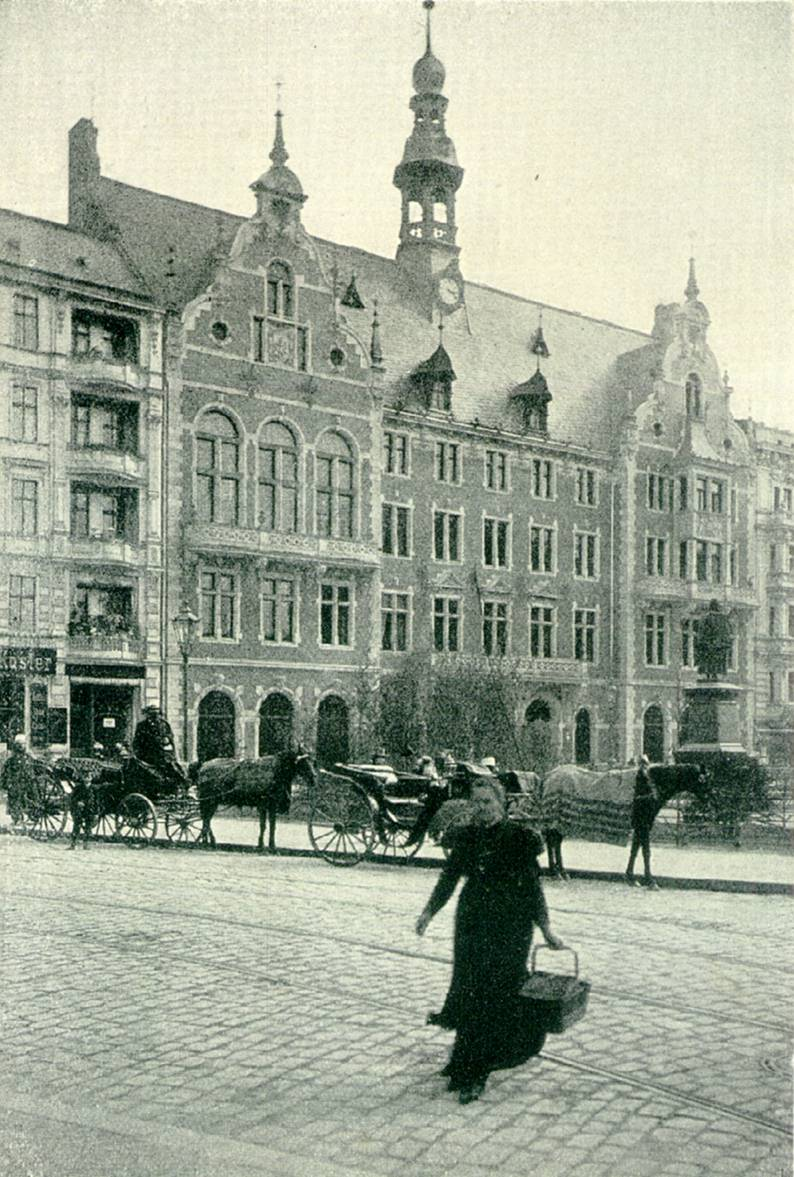
Old Schöneberg Town Hall, 1895

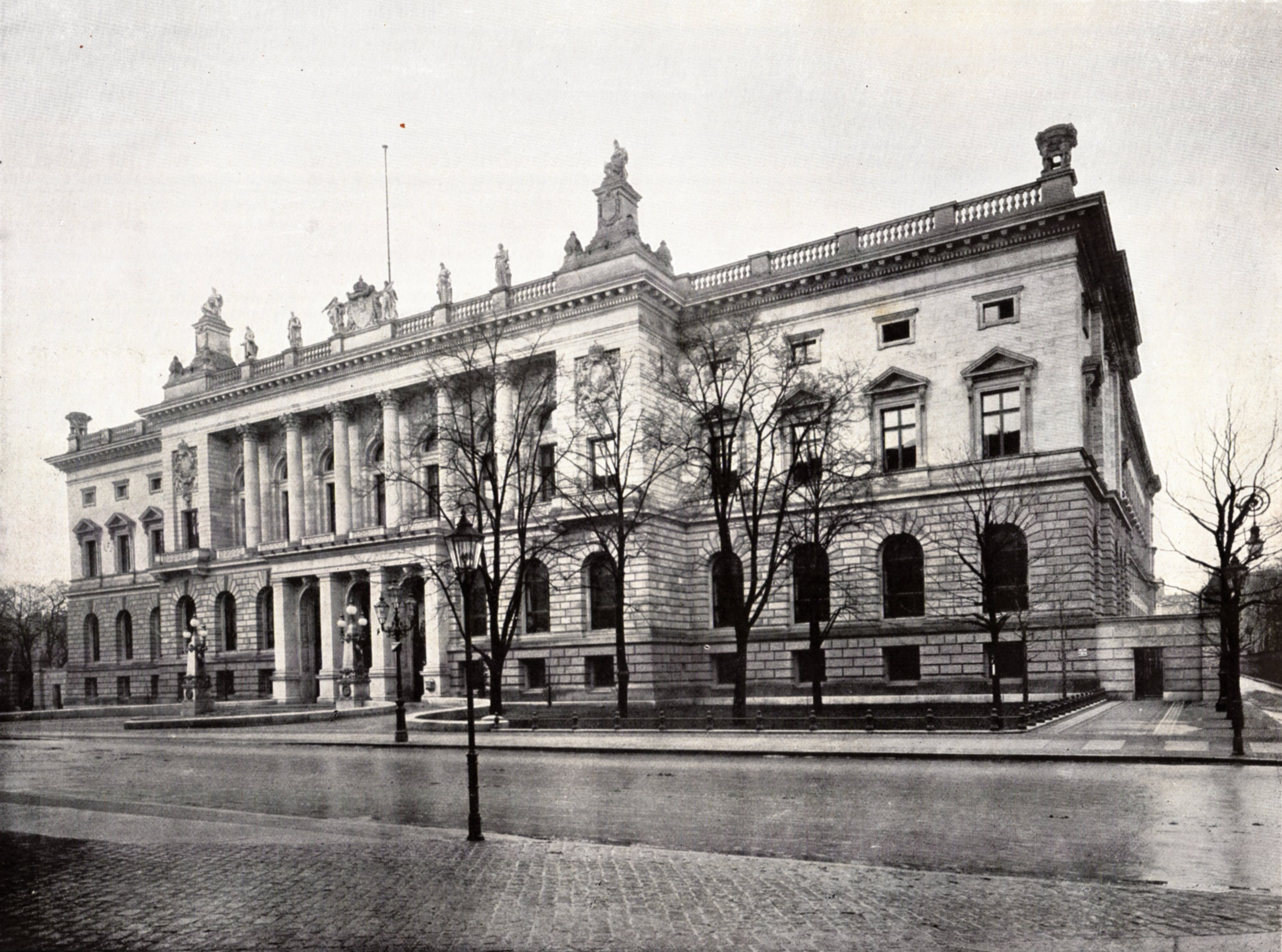
Prussian House of Representatives, 1900

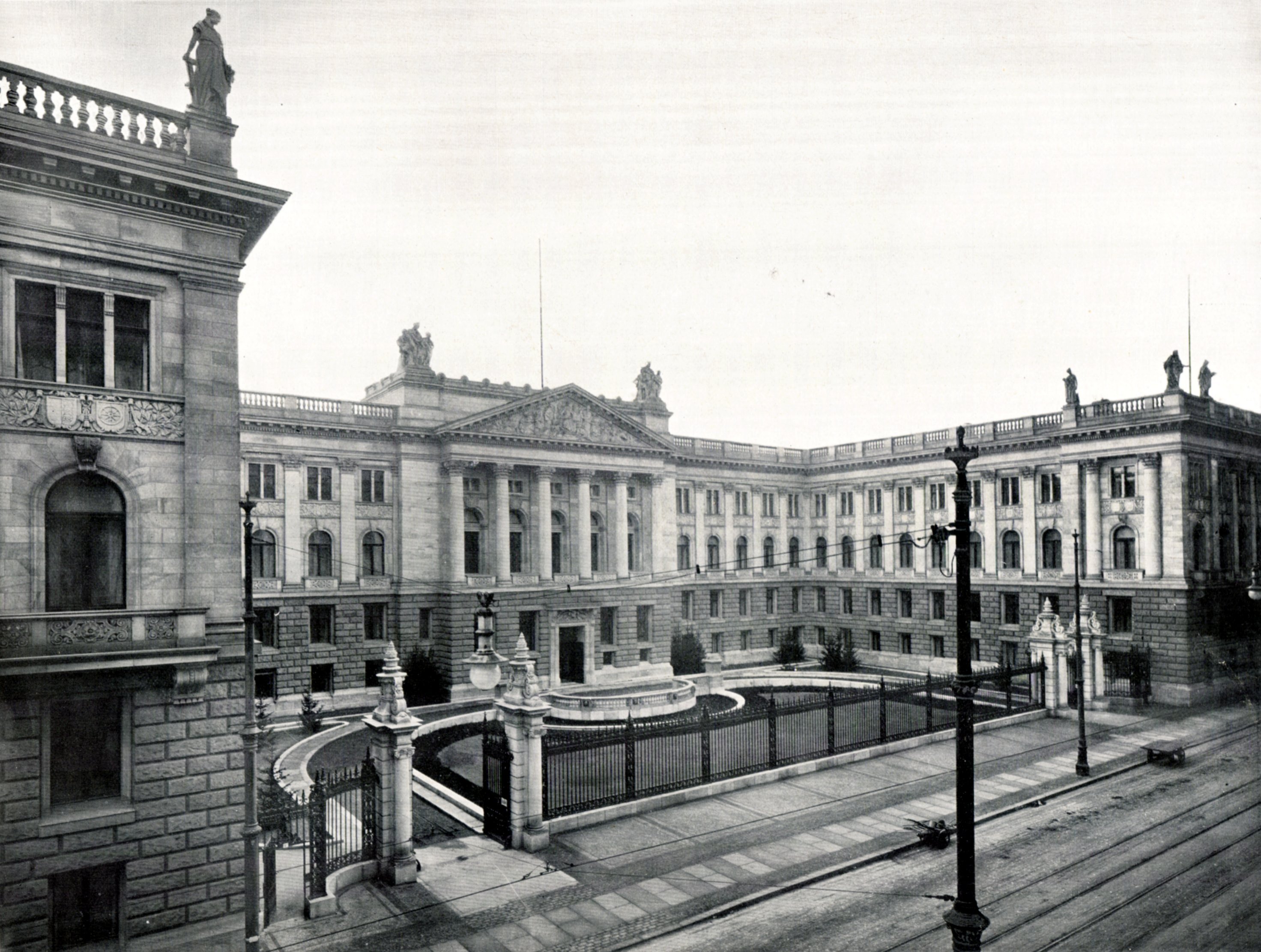
Prussian House of Lords, shortly after completion, 1904

Friedrich Schulze lived in Berlin from 1862, where he studied at the Berlin Bauakademie from 1862 to 1867 after completing his Abitur, interrupted by his participation in the Austro-Prussian War of 1866. During his studies, he worked as an assistant to the architect Friedrich Adler. Until passing the master builder examination in 1873, he worked as a construction manager in railway construction, interrupted by his participation in the Franco-Prussian War of 1870–1871. On 19 April 1874, his son Otto was born, who also became an architect.

In 1873, Friedrich Schulze was employed by the Ministry of Building Commission and taught part-time at the Berlin School of Applied Arts. As a state building officer, he was recruited by Friedrich Adler in 1877 to his staff in the Prussian Ministry of Public Works. In 1879, he briefly worked at the Kassel District Government, but returned in 1880 as a building inspector to the Ministry of Building Commission in Berlin.

In 1892, he became a member of the board of the Architects’ Association of Berlin, which he had joined in 1870. From 1908/09 to 1912, he was acting assistant director at the Teaching Institution of the Berlin Museum of Decorative Arts.

As a result of a car accident in 1907, he retired on 1 January 1909.
