= Cultural Cold War =

Propaganda campaigns waged by both the United States and the Soviet Union

The CIA and the Cultural Cold War

Flag of the United States

Flag of the Soviet Union

The Cultural Cold War was in a set of propaganda campaigns waged by the United States and the Soviet Union during the Cold War, with each country promoting their own culture, arts, literature, and music. In addition, less overtly, their opposing political choices and ideologies at the expense of the other. Many of the battles were fought in Europe or in European Universities, with Communist Party leaders depicting the United States as a cultural black hole while pointing to their own cultural heritage as proof that they were the inheritors of the European Enlightenment. The U.S. responded by accusing the Soviets of "disregarding the inherent value of culture," and subjugating art to the controlling policies of a totalitarian political system, even as they felt saddled with the responsibility of preserving and fostering Western civilization's best cultural traditions, given the many European artists who took refuge in the United States before, during, and after World War II. Through officially sponsored programs and covert initiatives, both superpowers tried to persuade foreign audiences that their political and economic systems represented the future of modern civilization.

In Eastern Europe in particular, socialist and communist parties portrayed the United States as culturally shallow and commercially driven, while the U.S. government and its Western European allies highlighted Soviet censorship and repression, sponsoring exhibitions, concerts, journals, and conferences that presented themselves as defenders of artistic freedom and the European intellectual tradition. Historians have shown that many of these initiatives were linked to U.S. and Soviet state agencies, especially the Central Intelligence Agency (CIA) and its network of front organizations, even when they appeared to be independent cultural or intellectual projects.

Many of these struggles unfolded in post-war Europe and especially within universities and intellectual circles, where American and Soviet officials sought to win over students, professors, and cultural elites. Communist Party leaders depicted the United States as a cultural "black hole" while presenting Soviet culture as heir to the European Enlightenment, whereas U.S. officials accused the Soviets of subordinating art to a totalitarian political system and claimed to act as guardians of Western civilization's leading artistic traditions, given the many European artists who took refuge in the United States before, during, and after World War II.

Historians have emphasized the role of covertly funded organizations such as the Congress for Cultural Freedom (CCF), which organized magazines, conferences, exhibitions and music festivals across more than thirty countries, and of high-profile cultural tours by figures such as jazz trumpeter Louis Armstrong and other jazz "ambassadors" as key instruments of American "soft power" during the Cultural Cold War. Scholars also note that writers, artists and musicians involved in these programs sometimes used the opportunities and resources provided by U.S. and Soviet sponsors to pursue their own aesthetic and political agendas, rather than simply reproducing official government positions.

== Background ==
In 1950, the Central Intelligence Agency (CIA) surreptitiously created the Congress for Cultural Freedom (CCF) to counter the Cominform's "peace offensive." At its peak, the Congress had "offices in thirty-five countries, employed dozens of personnel, published over twenty prestige magazines, held art exhibitions, owned a news and features service, organized high-profile international conferences, and rewarded musicians and artists with prizes and public performances." The point of these endeavors was to "showcase" U.S. and European high culture, including not just musical works but paintings, ballets, and other artistic avenues, for the benefit of nonaligned foreign intellectuals.

== Music ==
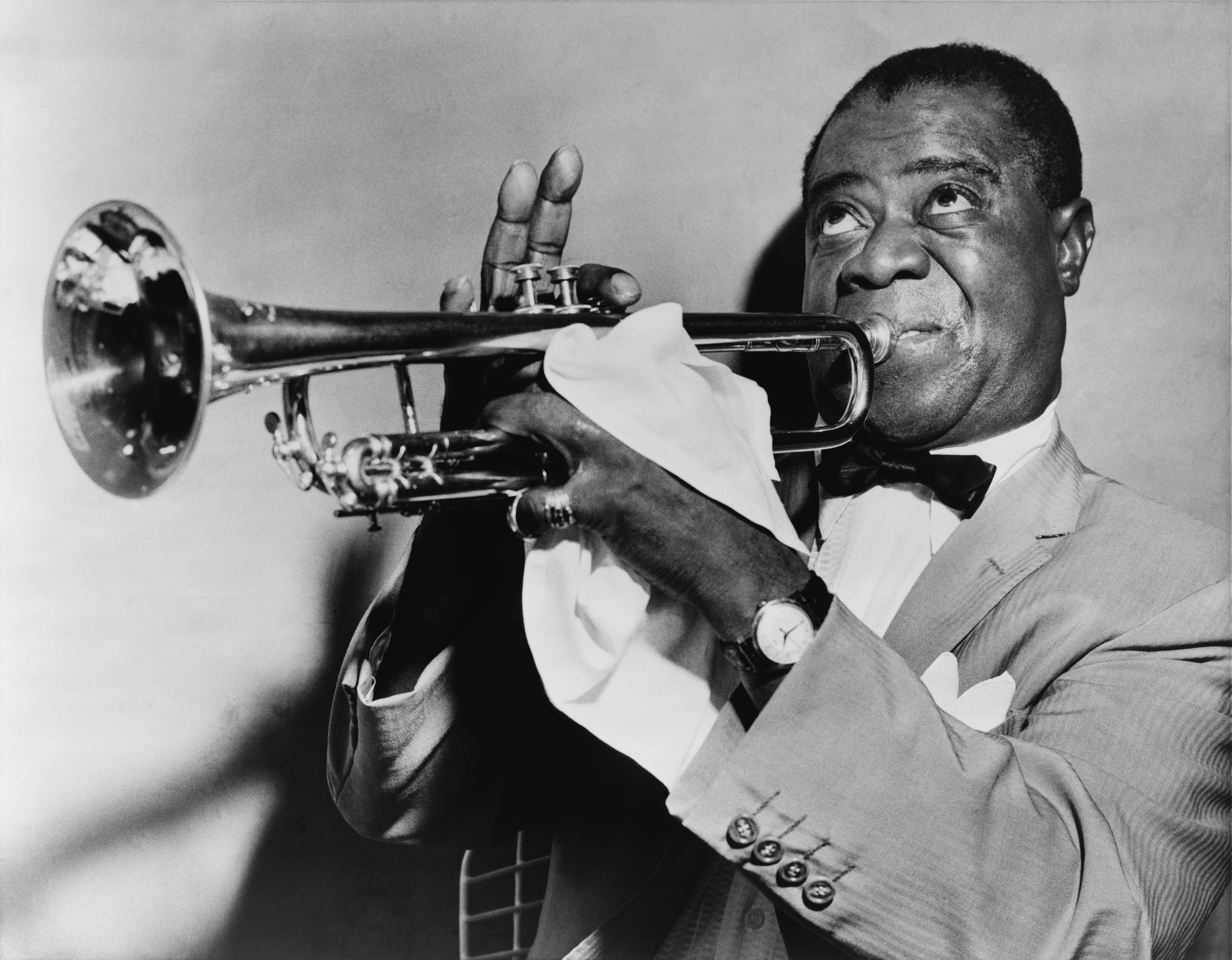
Jazz trumpeter and cultural icon Louis Armstrong in 1953.

During the Cold War, Louis Armstrong became one of the most visible American musicians sent abroad as a symbol of U.S. culture and racial progress during the 1950s, Armstrong and other leading jazz artist shared a part in United States and State Department–sponsored tours, often were described as "jazz ambassador" programs, intended to showcase an image of racial democracy in the United States and to counter Soviet criticism of American racism.

Armstrong's concerts in the city brought huge crowds and positive press coverage, and U.S. officials highlighted photographs of Armstrong playing music with local trumpeters and performing for thousands of people. Some historians argue that these tours were designed both to promote American music and to suggest that African American performers could succeed within U.S. society, despite the heavy amounts of racial discrimination.

Armstrong often spoke on the criticism of racial injustice in the United States. In 1957, during the Little Rock Crisis, he publicly shamed the Arkansas governor Orval Faubus and President Dwight D. Eisenhower for not protecting Black students seeking to join the Little Rock Central High School. His speeches drew a large media attention and backlash from critics, however, his speeches also exposed the State Department's use of Black musicians as symbols of progress with the ongoing struggle for civil rights inside the United States.

In the end, although the U.S. no doubt benefited from the tours by black artists (including Duke Ellington and Dizzy Gillespie), these ambassadors did not advocate a singularly American identity. They instead encouraged solidarity among black people, and were constantly contesting those policies that did not fully sympathize with the aims of the civil rights movement.

Many U.S. government organizations used American music to persuade audiences worldwide that the U.S. was a cradle for the growth of music. The CIA and, in turn the CCF, were reluctant to patronize America's musical avant-garde, which included artists such experimental musicians as Milton Babbitt and John Cage. The CCF took a more conservative approach, as outlined under its General Secretary, Nicolas Nabokov, and concentrated its efforts on presenting older European works that had been banned or condemned by the Communist Party.

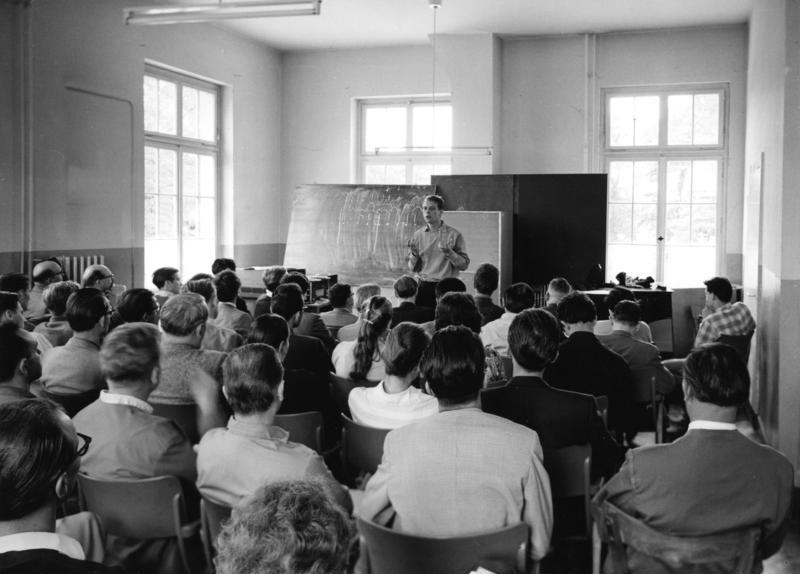
Darmstädter Ferienkurse ("Darmstadt Summer Course") is a regular summer event of contemporary classical music in Darmstadt, Hesse, Germany.

The CCF provided partial funding for the Darmstadt Summer Course from 1946 to 1956. This was the beginning of the Darmstadt School of composers which helped pioneer the avant-garde techniques of Serialism.

In 1952, the CCF sponsored the Festival of Twentieth-Century Masterpieces of Modern Arts in Paris. Over the next thirty days, the festival hosted nine separate orchestras which performed works by over 70 composers, many of whom had been dismissed by communist critics as "degenerate" and "sterile," including composers such as Dmitri Shostakovich and Claude Debussy. The festival opened with a performance of Stravinsky's The Rite of Spring, as performed by the Boston Symphony Orchestra. Thomas Braden, a senior member of the CIA said: "The Boston Symphony Orchestra won more acclaim for the U.S. in Paris than John Foster Dulles or Dwight D. Eisenhower could have brought with a hundred speeches".

The CIA, in particular, used a wide range of musical genres, including Broadway musicals, and even the jazz of Dizzy Gillespie, to convince music enthusiasts across the globe that the U.S. was committed to the musical arts as much as they were to the literary and visual arts. Under the leadership of Nabokov, the CCF organized impressive musical events that were anti-communist in nature, transporting America's prime musical talents to Berlin, Paris, and London to provide a steady series of performances and festivals. In order to promote cooperation between artists and the CCF, and thus extend their ideals, the CCF provided financial aid to artists in need of monetary assistance.

However, because the CCF failed to offer much support for classical music associated with the likes of Bach, Mozart, and Beethoven, it was deemed an "authoritarian" tool of Soviet communism and wartime German and Italian fascism. The CCF also distanced itself from experimental musical avant-garde artists such as Milton Babbitt and John Cage, preferring to focus on earlier European works that had been banned or condemned as "formalist" by Soviet authorities.

== Film and broadcasting ==
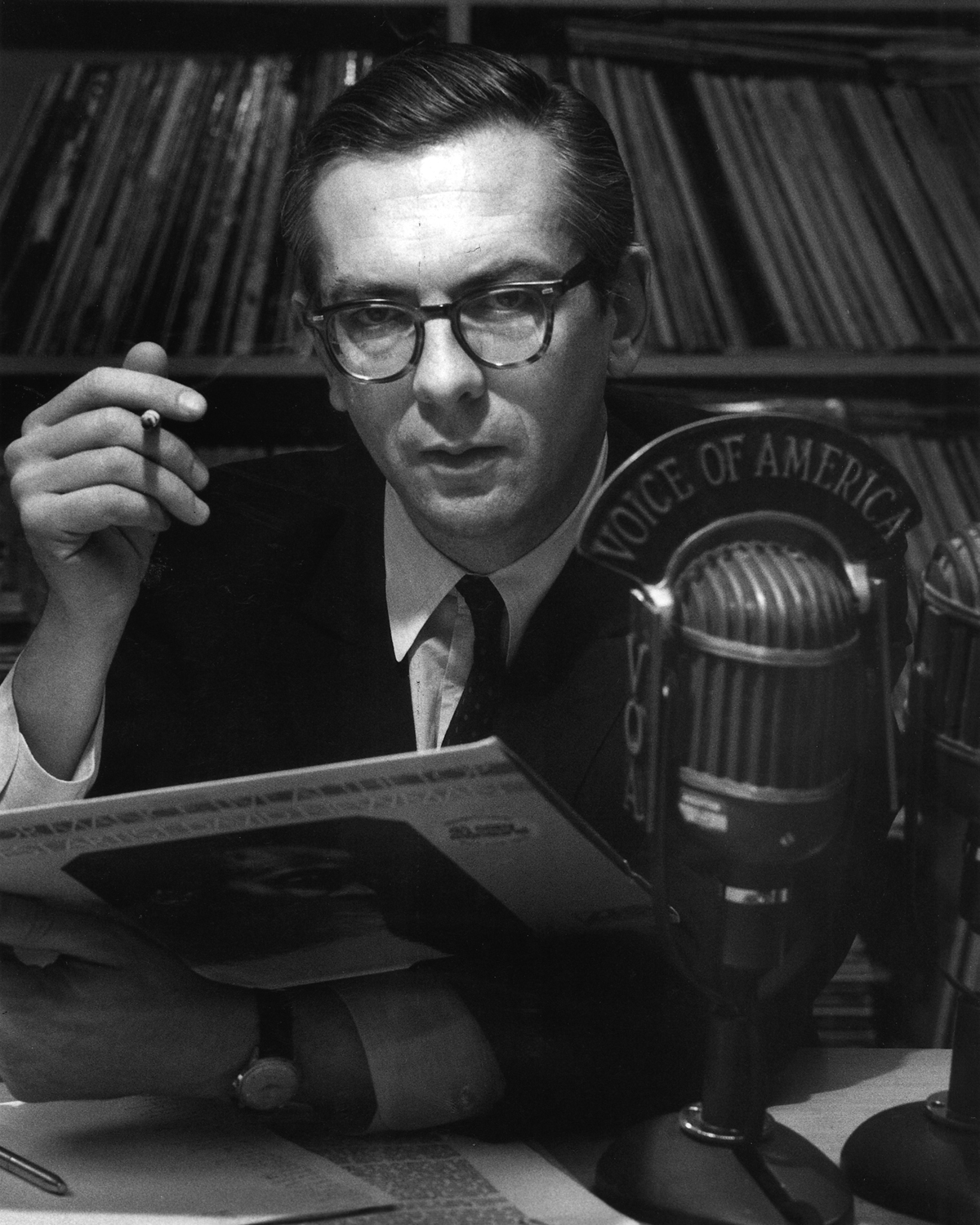
Voice of America jazz broadcaster Willis Conover recording a program, a key U.S. cultural diplomacy outlet during the Cold War.

Both superpowers during the Cultural Cold War expanded their feature films, newsreels, documentaries, and international broadcasting. They used these to promote their countries' progress of modernity, democracy, and socialism to audiences at home and abroad.

On the American side, the United States Information Agency (USIA) had built one of the largest motion-picture operations of the 20th century. Starting in 1953, the USIA produced or distributed thousands of films in dozens of languages; each of these films had a similar goal to "tell America's story" to foreign audiences. These films highlighted technological achievement while also addressing Soviet accusations about racism, and economic inequality in the United States.

These media systems competed with one another and it allowed tools of media to be used to benefit ones side of the Cultural Cold War rather than mere entertainment.

The Hollywood blacklist was the mid-20th century banning of suspected Communists from working in the United States entertainment industry. The Unfriendly Ten" but soon changed to "The Hollywood Ten" – and to pledge that "thereafter no Communists or other subversives would 'knowingly' be employed in Hollywood."

== Print media and exhibitions ==
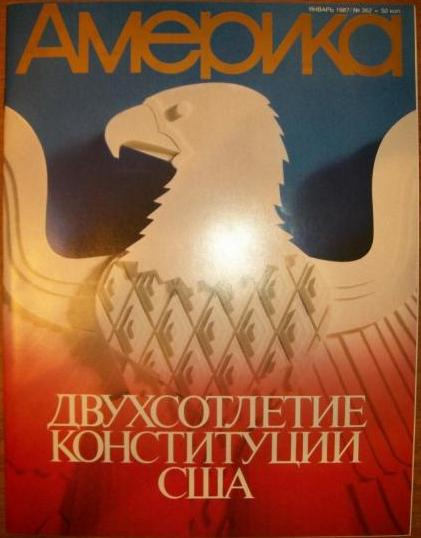
1987 edition, dedicated to the 200th anniversary of the U.S. Constitution

Print media was an additional way for the United States and the Soviet Union to present everyday life and national achievements to foreign audiences. This included things like magazines, illustrated pamphlets, and travelling displays that made their societies look modern, successful and peaceful.

One Article AMERIKA was a Soviet magazine that was published primarily in Russian, printed by the U.S. government in Manila were thrown onto Soviet public transportation by U.S. Diplomats. With a printing rate of 50,000 copies per month, these magazines shift Soviet's view of American culture and lifestyle. One of the magazine's editors, Elio Battaglia, claims "It was what some would call propaganda, But, you know, propaganda simply means diffusing the kind of truth that you believe in."

Over the course of its 6-week run the American Art Exhibition in Moscow attracted 3 million visitors. This museum was created in July 1959, and captured American art, fashion, capitalism, modern homes, and ideal everyday American lifestyle. This exhibition was another example of print and media being used to promote nationalistic ideologies and culture.

== Visual arts ==
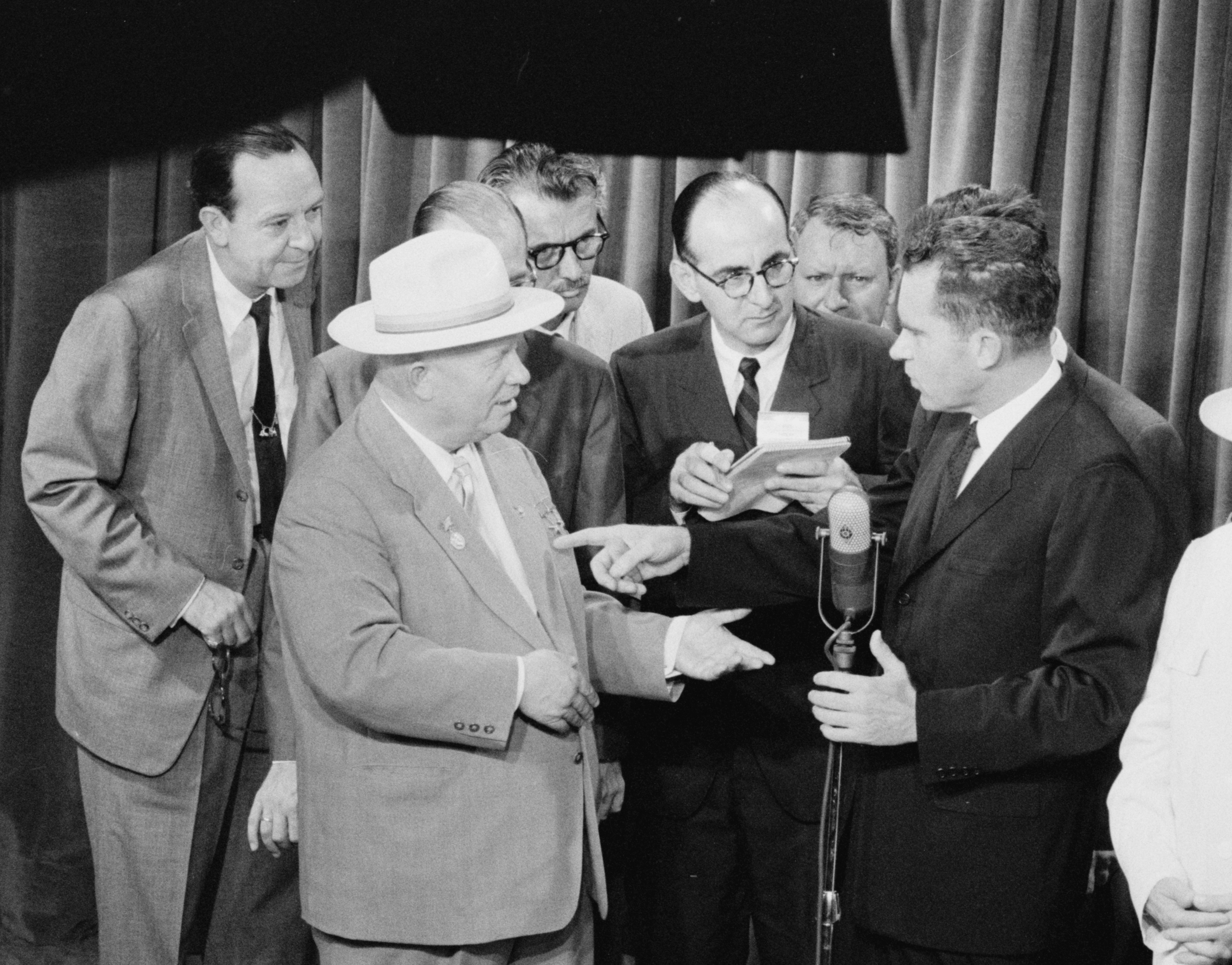
U.S. Vice President Richard Nixon and Soviet Premier Nikita Khrushchev debate in a model American kitchen at the 1959 American National Exhibition in Moscow

The USSR and United States used art as a means of propaganda and expressed this through different styles. The communist Eastern Bloc art style was characterized as Socialist realism, using realistic styles to create optimistic depictions of Soviet lifestyle. They usually contained elements of agricultural prosperity and security provided by the Communist government.

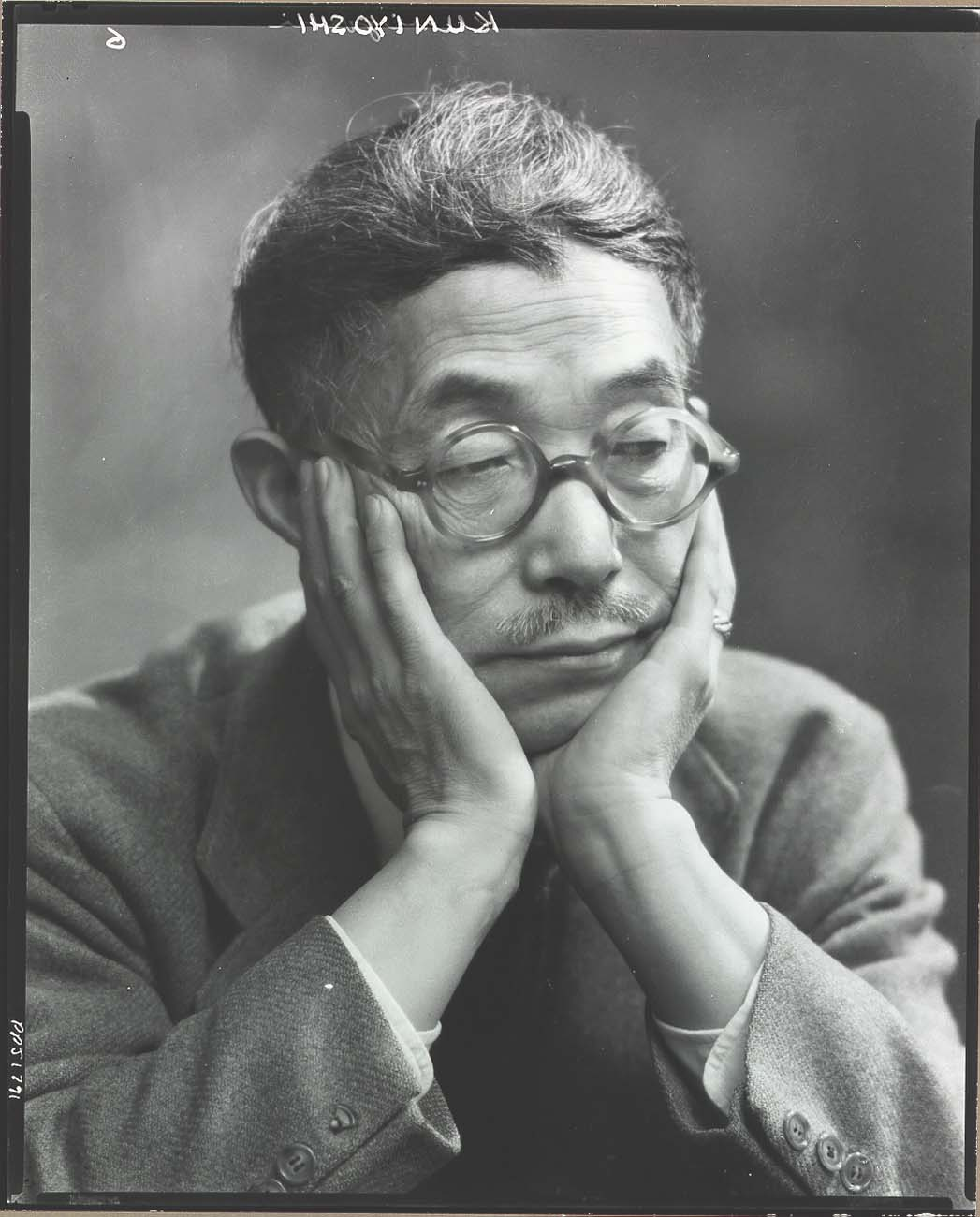
Artist Yasuo Kuniyoshi

Western civilization in contrast, celebrated individuality and freedom of expression. Some valued artists during this time include Jackson Pollock and Alexander Calder who were celebrated for their abstract work. The idea of abstract art and creativity emphasize the capitalistic values of progressiveness and freedom of expression. The CIA supported this because propaganda during the Cold War with the Soviet Union, this new artistic movement could be held up as proof of the creativity, the intellectual freedom, and the cultural power of the US. Russian art, strapped into the communist ideological straitjacket, could not compete.

'Examination of the rising success of Abstract Expressionism in America after World War II, therefore, entails consideration of the role of the leading museum of contemporary art—The Museum of Modern Art (MoMA)—and the ideological needs of its officers during a period of virulent anticommunism and an intensifying "cold war."'

== Legacy and historiography ==
Since the conclusion of the Cold War, scholars have treated the Cold War as a key dimension of international history. Declassified documents from the United States, the Soviet Union and their allies have allowed historians to recognize how governments tried to shape foreign and domestic opinion through culture.

Many historians would argue that the Cultural Cold War was a mixed success, many aspects of society like music, science, and paintings were promoted to the competing ideologies. One of the biggest improvements that resulted from the Cold War is the space race causing for an increase in science and education. Throughout the 50's and 60's, each country developed technology to gain the upper hand in military superiority, including the expansion into space. This gave way to new advanced computers, satellites, spacecraft, and other inventions are still seen and utilized today. Although there were advancements, much of the Cultural Cold War focused less on educational advancements and more on propaganda. The use of the cultural propaganda was used to influence the population and win the support of the public though psychological warfare, making its purpose and intentions questionable.

The Cultural Cold War's left a complex legacy that was neither an extreme positive or negative, this period increased cross-cultural exchange, put an emphasis on the Civil Rights Movement with the promotion of black artists, and spread American art styles globally like the American Art Exhibition in Moscow. Different forms of art and culture were spread as a result of the Cold War, creating the cross-cultural flows that influenced jazz, art, cinema, dance, and media. Its legacy focuses on the success of propaganda and winning the publics hearts. The strategic use of the cultural promotion did not necessarily help to de-escalate any cultural tensions, considering that this was a period that contriditally both promoted and tore down stereotypes. However the Cultural Cold War helped shape the global cultural landscape that persists into modern day. Some of these notable changes include consumer culture, and scientific and educational investments.

== See also ==
- American National Exhibition – 1959 exhibition in Moscow
- A Beacon of Hope – 1963 U.S. government report
- CIA influence on public opinion
- Funded by the CIA...
- Lacy-Zarubin Agreement – Academic and cultural exchange treaty between the United States and the Soviet Union
- Herbert Marcuse – German–American philosopher, sociologist, and political theorist (1898–1979)
- Gloria Steinem – American activist and journalist (1934–2026)
- The Cold War in popular culture
