= Freedom Bell =

Bell in Berlin, Germany

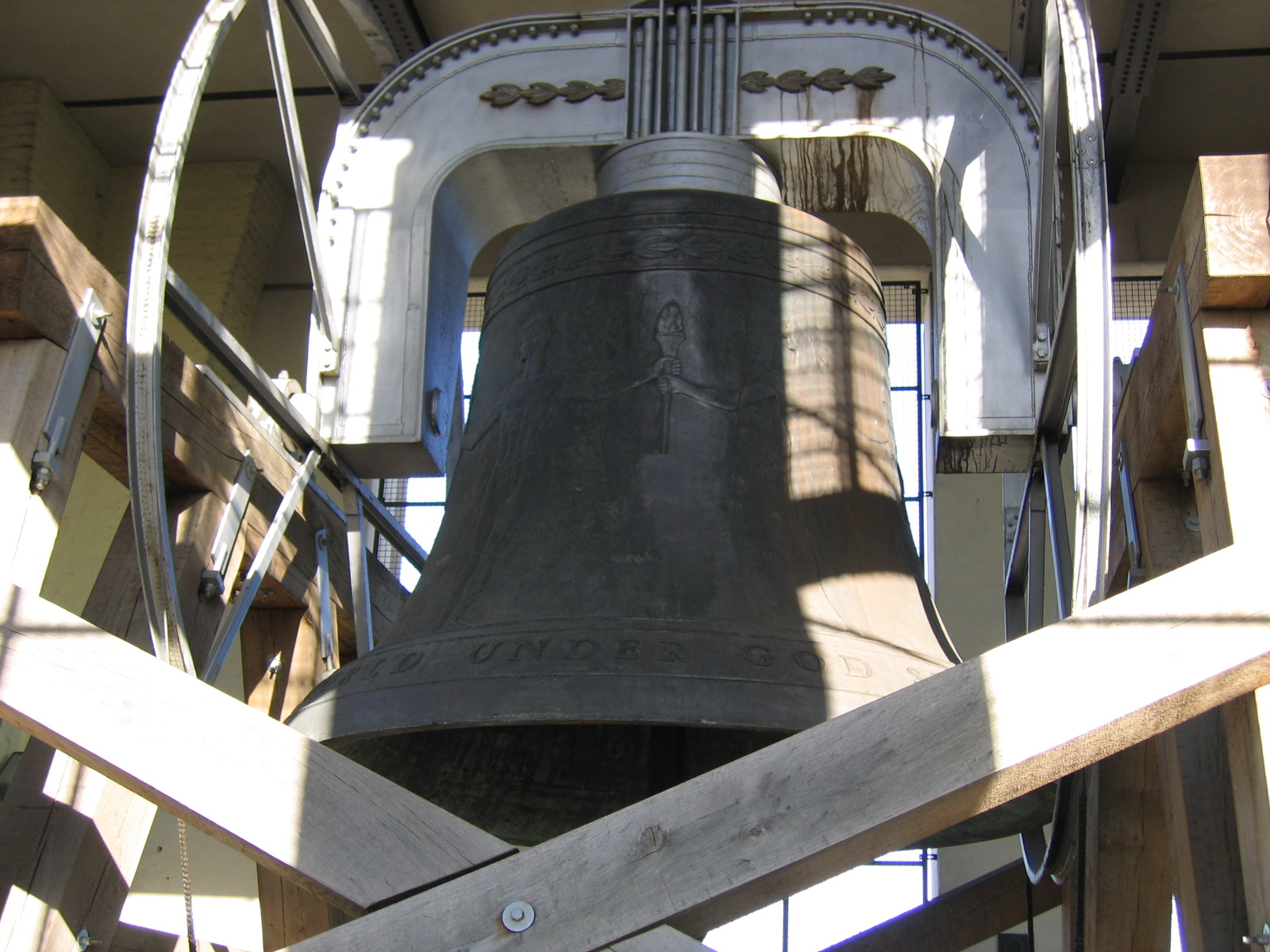
The Freedom Bell

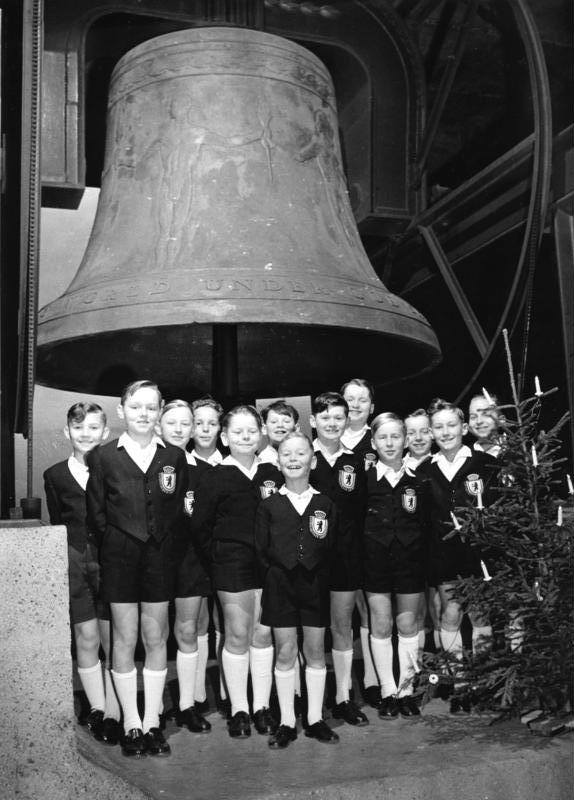
Schoolchildren pose beneath the Freedom Bell, 1958

The Freedom Bell (in German, Freiheitsglocke) in Berlin, Germany, is a bell that was given as a gift from Americans to the city of Berlin in 1950 as a symbol of anti-communism, and was inspired by the American Liberty Bell. Since 1950, the bell has been located in the Rathaus Schöneberg, the former city hall of West Berlin.

== Origins and installation ==
The initiative to give Berlin such a bell was taken by the Crusade for Freedom, a propaganda campaign sponsored by the National Committee for a Free Europe, the organization which operated Radio Free Europe. The campaign was launched by U.S. general Dwight D. Eisenhower on Labor Day, 1950, with General Lucius D. Clay, later known as the "father of the Berlin airlift", as its chairman. The stated purpose of the campaign was to offer all Americans an opportunity to play a personal part in a demonstration of the "free world's determination to resist Communist aggression." The bell was conceived by Abbott Washburn and Nate Crabtree and designed by Walter Dorwin Teague.

The 10-ton bell arrived from the British bell foundry of Gillett & Johnston to a ticker tape parade in New York City. It carries the inscription "That this world under God shall have a new birth of freedom". The bell subsequently visited 26 American cities, and people in every state were encouraged to sign a "Declaration of Freedom". 16 million signatures from American citizens were collected and are enshrined in Berlin along with the bell. The bell then traveled to Berlin, and was permanently installed in the West Berlin city hall on United Nations Day, October 24, 1950. More than 400,000 Berliners filled the square before the city hall (now John-F.-Kennedy-Platz) to witness the dedication ceremonies. General Clay gave a speech and pushed the button that started the bell ringing. Its tones were heard throughout East Berlin and into East Germany. The East German Socialist Unity Party of Germany (SED) launched a demonstration several miles from the dedication site, and party members denounced the bell as a "war bell", a "hunger bell" and a "death bell". SED central committee member Hans Jendretzky warned: "The rope of the death bell will become the gallows rope for those who ring it."

The Governing Mayor of West Berlin, Ernst Reuter (SPD), declared that Germany "will never rest or relax until freedom will shine over the countries of Eastern Europe that are at present forced to live in slavery".

== Occasions for ringing ==
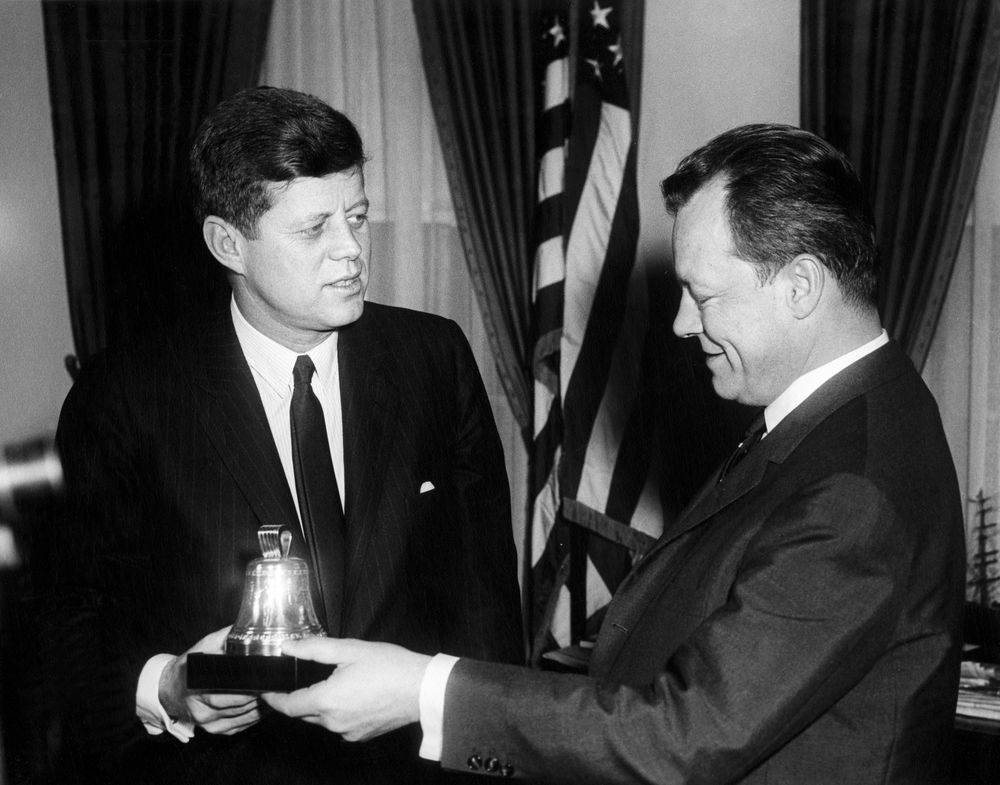
Willy Brandt gifting John F. Kennedy a replica of the Freedom Bell.

The bell is rung daily for five minutes at noon, and at midnight on Christmas Eve and on New Year's Eve. A recording of the ringing was broadcast by RIAS, the American radio in West Berlin, every Sunday just before noon. These broadcasts have been continued by the successor of RIAS, Deutschlandfunk Kultur. In the radio broadcasts, the ringing of the bell is followed by an excerpt from the text of the "Declaration of Freedom" in German.

The bell has also been rung on several special occasions: the 1953 Uprising of June 17, the 1956 Hungarian Uprising, the construction of the Berlin Wall in 1961, and the Reunification of Germany of 1990. In 2001, the bell was rung following the September 11, 2001 attacks, and thousands of Berlin citizens paid their respect at John-F.-Kennedy-Platz in front of the former city hall of West Berlin.
