= CIA influence on public opinion =

At various times, under its own initiative or in accordance with directives from the President of the United States or the National Security Council staff, the Central Intelligence Agency (CIA) has attempted to influence public opinion both in the United States and abroad.

== Subsidies of non-government groups ==
In 1947, the Soviet-dominated Cominform (Communist Information Bureau) was created by Joseph Stalin. The conference, at which it was created, was a response of Eastern European countries to invitations to attend the July 1947 Paris Conference on the Marshall Plan. Cominform's stated purpose was to coordinate the work of Communist parties, under Soviet direction, so the Soviet leader Joseph Stalin called the conference in response to divergences among the eastern European governments on whether or not to attend the Paris Conference on Marshall Aid in July 1947.

The initial seat of the Cominform was located in Belgrade (then the capital of the Socialist Federal Republic of Yugoslavia). After the expulsion of Yugoslavia from the group in June 1948, the seat was moved to Bucharest, Romania. The expulsion of Yugoslavia from the Cominform for Titoism marked the beginning of the Informbiro period in that nation's history.

The intended purpose of the Cominform was to coordinate actions between Communist parties, and scores of Communist-controlled professional, artistic and intellectual groups under Soviet direction. The Kremlin had set up the Cominform in the early years of the cold war to coordinate the activities of the Cominform acted as a tool of Soviet foreign policy and Stalinism.

In response, CIA psychological operators decided that the Cominform-controlled groups could best be countered by Western groups, including not only intensely anti-Communist right-wing groups, but groups across the ideological spectrum. Many of them were unaware of CIA subsidy, or such knowledge was restricted to a few leaders, and thus these groups were not expected to follow orders. Wilford cited, as examples, the small magazines Partisan Review and The New Leader, which received CIA funds in one way or another, but owed nothing to the agency, either in their founding or in their operations, and were not "front" organizations. Other groups formed by the CIA, however, were true fronts, although some of the individuals being sponsored were unaware of the source of funds.

Philip Agee suggested that funding from the CIA to the National Student Association, which had been formed in 1947, may have begun in 1950. Tom Braden, head of the CIA International Organizations Division, does not disclose what year this funding began; but it clearly began in the 1950s and continued until 1967. Braden said that the Division was established in 1950, when Director of Central Intelligence Allen W. Dulles overruled Frank Wisner, who headed the quasi-autonomous Office of Policy Coordination (OPC). Until 1952, OPC was the covert action branch of the U.S. government, loosely part of CIA but also with direct access and appeal to the Secretaries of Defense and State.

1950 also marked the beginning of the ten-year Crusade for Freedom, an operation to generate American support for Radio Free Europe that was covertly backed by the CIA.

Another organization set up on 26 June 1950, as the cultural arm of the International Organizations Division, was the Congress for Cultural Freedom.

In 1967, a number of clandestine subsidies to associations and journals became public. Given the CIA's prohibition from domestic activities, support of US groups with worldwide presence, such as the National Student Association, were especially problematic. The exposure, by Ramparts magazine, of CIA subsidies to the National Association, according to Time, led to the term "orphans", referring to nearly 100 private agencies that had been getting CIA money, and were affected by a Presidential order that support must end by the end of 1967. Time succinctly summarized the issue with "the question is whether, in a free society, it is right, wise—or necessary—for supposedly independent organizations to receive secret subsidies."

Whatever the merits or demerits of the CIA's methods, most of these groups served the U.S. well in its contest for the faith and understanding of the world's workers and thinkers, students and teachers, refugees from yesterday and leaders of tomorrow. This led to the appointment of a presidential commission, headed by Under Secretary of State Nicholas Katzenbach, to figure out how the gap left by the CIA should be filled. ... a politically ambitious former California newspaper publisher who served with the CIA between 1950 and 1954, added further details. In an article in the Saturday Evening Post, Braden indignantly defended the CIA against charges that it had been "immoral" by recording some of the extremely useful things it accomplished early in the cold war.

By 1953, according to Braden, the US subsidy program was operating in earnest.

By 1953 we were operating or influencing international organizations in every field where Communist fronts had previously seized ground, and in some where they had not even begun to operate. The money we spent was very little by Soviet standards. But that was reflected in the first rule of our operational plan: "Limit the money to amounts private organizations can credibly spend." The other rules were equally obvious: "Use legitimate, existing organizations; disguise the extent of American interest: protect the integrity of the organization by not requiring it to support every aspect of official American policy.

A front organization organized in 1959 was the Independent Service for Information, set up at Harvard specifically for the purpose of getting some young anti-Communist Americans to attend a huge youth festival being organized by the Communists in Vienna. Among those sponsored were Gloria Steinem who had just spent a year and half in India, where she befriended Indira Gandhi and the widow of the "revolutionary humanist" M. N. Roy, and had met a researcher who seems to have been a C.I.A. agent or contact. Steinem was hired to run the I.S.I. and to recruit knowledgeable young Americans who could debate effectively with the Communist organizers of the festival, defending the United States against Communist criticism.

=== Disclosures ===
==== Planted news ====
Ralph McGehee, a former CIA officer, stated that the CIA often placed news stories anonymously in news publications to spread false ideas favorable to CIA goals. Stories that CIA planted might be picked up and further spread by additional newspapers and other third parties, in a slightly altered form, or even picked up as news and then rewritten by a journalist.

Propaganda thus planted by the CIA to shape public opinion could circle back and contaminate the CIA's own information files. An example given by McGehee based on his own experience is the CIA fabrication in 1965 of a story about weapon shipments sent by sea to the Viet Cong in a CIA effort to "prove" foreign support for the Viet Cong. The CIA "took tons of Communist-made weapons from its own warehouses, loaded them on a Vietnamese coastal vessel, faked a firefight, and then called in Western reporters...to 'prove' North Vietnamese aid to the Viet Cong." The story got picked up by other news sources, so much so that the Marines later began to patrol the coast to intercept reported contraband of the type earlier "found."

==== CIA secret funding for "cutouts" ====
In March 1967, Ramparts magazine reported that the CIA had been funding the National Student Association through a series of foundation cutouts. Resulting journalistic and other investigations led to the cessation of most CIA subsidies.

After reading of the disclosures, Tom Braden wrote about looking at "a creased and faded yellow paper. It bears the following inscription in pencil:

Received from Warren G. Haskins, $15,000. (signed) Norris A. Grambo." For I was Warren G. Haskins. Norris A. Grambo was Irving Brown, of the American Federation of Labor. The $15,000 was from the vaults of the CIA, and the piece of yellow paper is the last memento I possess of a vast and secret operation whose death has been brought about by small-minded and resentful men.

Relationships with organized labor are not surprising considering the CIA's direct predecessor, the Office of Strategic Services (OSS) had a Labor Branch under Arthur Goldberg. European labor groups often provided OSS with volunteers to penetrate occupied Europe, and, with greatest danger, into Nazi Germany.

[Arthur] Goldberg, head of the Labor Division of the OSS clandestine intelligence unit, later appointed to the US Supreme Court by President John F. Kennedy—was known at the time for his defense of the Chicago Newspaper Guild during its 1938 strike against the Hearst Corporation. Joining OSS/London in 1943, Goldberg convinced colleagues and OSS director, Gen. William J. Donovan, of the need to establish contact with underground labor groups in occupied and Axis countries. ... Because such groups were already major forces of internal resistance behind enemy lines, they constituted a ready made source of valuable military and political intelligence.

== CIA and mass media ==
Historically, the CIA made use of mass media assets, both foreign and domestic, for its covert operations. Popular coverage of the subject came to the attention of the public in 1973, when columnist Jack Anderson reported that the Nixon campaign had used a foreign correspondent and Hearst bureau chief in London to spy on Democratic Party candidates, both for the 1968 Nixon campaign and for the 1972 Nixon campaign. Anderson also reported that the accused journalist in question, Seymour K. Freiden, worked for the CIA. The article led the New York Times and the Washington Star-News to followup on the story, asking then director William E. Colby if their own journalists were on the CIA payroll. Colby ordered an internal CIA inquiry and delivered the results to the Star News. They reported that the CIA had enlisted more than thirty Americans working abroad as journalists.

=== Congressional investigations ===
A wide range of CIA operations were examined in a series of Congressional investigations from 1975 to 1976 including CIA ties with journalists. The most extensive discussion of CIA relations with news media from these investigations is in the Church Committee's final report, published in April 1976. The report covered CIA ties with both foreign and domestic news media.

For foreign news media, the report concluded that:

The CIA currently maintains a network of several hundred foreign individuals around the world who provide intelligence for the CIA and at times attempt to influence opinion through the use of covert propaganda. These individuals provide the CIA with direct access to a large number of newspapers and periodicals, scores of press services and news agencies, radio and television stations, commercial book publishers, and other foreign media outlets.

For domestic media, the report states:

Approximately 50 of the [Agency] assets are individual American journalists or employees of U.S. media organizations. Of these, fewer than half are "accredited" by U.S. media organizations ... The remaining individuals are non-accredited freelance contributors and media representatives abroad ... More than a dozen United States news organizations and commercial publishing houses formerly provided cover for CIA agents abroad. A few of these organizations were unaware that they provided this cover.

=== CIA response ===
The Church report stated that prior to the report's completion, the CIA had already begun restricting its use of journalists. According to the report, former CIA director William Colby told the committee that in 1973 he had issued instructions that "As a general policy, the Agency will not make any clandestine use of staff employees of U.S. publications which have a substantial impact or influence on public opinion."

In February 1976, Director George H. W. Bush announced an even more restrictive policy: "effective immediately, CIA will not enter into any paid or contractual relationship with any full-time or part-time news correspondent accredited by any U.S. news service, newspaper, periodical, radio or television network or station.

By the time the Church Committee Report was completed, the Report stated, all CIA contacts with accredited journalists had been dropped. The Committee noted, however, that "accredited correspondent" meant the ban was limited to individuals "formally authorized by contract or issuance of press credentials to represent themselves as correspondents" and that non-contract workers who did not receive press credentials, such as stringers or freelancers, were not included.

=== Other coverage ===
Journalist Carl Bernstein, writing in an October 1977 article in the magazine Rolling Stone, said that the Church Committee report covered up CIA relations with news media, and named a number of journalists and organizations who CIA officers he interviewed said worked with the CIA.

== Influencing public opinion abroad ==
The CIA urged its field stations to use their "propaganda assets" to refute those who did not agree with the Warren Report. An April 1967 dispatch from CIA headquarters said: "Conspiracy theories have frequently thrown suspicion on our organization, for example by falsely alleging that Lee Harvey Oswald worked for us. The aim of this dispatch is to provide material for countering and discrediting the claims of the conspiracy theorists, so as to inhibit circulation of such claims in other countries." The Agency instructed its stations around the world to "discuss the publicity problem with liaison and friendly elite contacts, especially politicians and editors" and "employ propaganda assets to answer and refute the attacks of the critics. Book reviews and feature articles are particularly appropriate for this purpose."

In 1974, E. Howard Hunt, a former officer of the agency, revealed that he had been sent by the CIA's Psychological Warfare department to obtain the film rights of Animal Farm from George Orwell's widow, and the resulting 1954 animation was funded by the agency.

== Work with entertainment ==
In the mid-1990s, a man named Chase Brandon, an operations officer for the CIA who was previously assigned to South America, was re-assigned as a liaison to Hollywood. Brandon's film credits include The Recruit, The Sum of All Fears, Enemy of the State, Bad Company and In the Company of Spies. He has consulted for television programs including The Agency and Alias. He has appeared on Discovery, Learning Channel, History Channel, PBS, A&E, and has been interviewed on E! Entertainment, Access Hollywood, and Entertainment Tonight.

The Guardian journalist John Patterson criticizes the CIA assistance as being only to complimentary productions, including not running material, such as "the original pilot episode of The Agency, which was pulled. It featured the spymasters preventing a plot by a Bin Laden-backed terrorist cell to blow up a fictionalized Harrods. The airing of such an episode might have pointed up the real CIA's corresponding lack of success in foiling the World Trade Center attacks."

According to Brandon, the agency would not endorse Spy Game, starring Robert Redford and Brad Pitt. The final rewrite "showed our senior management in an insensitive light and we just wouldn't want to be a part of that kind of project", said Brandon, who also withheld approval from 24, a Fox series about a fictional intelligence agency, CTU, that "also suggests all is not hunky-dory in the company's upper echelons." And The Bourne Identity, based on the 1984 novel by Robert Ludlum, was "so awful that I tossed it in the burn bag after page 25".

Patterson observed:

It used to be the case that if a movie explicitly condemned CIA actions - such as Under Fire - the studios could be counted on to bury it. That was no longer true after Costa-Gavras's Missing won Jack Lemmon an Oscar in 1982, and Iran-Contra slimed the CIA in the late 1980s. Since then, "CIA renegade" has become a dependable staple not just of big-budget movies like Enemy of the State, but also of a million straight-to-cable action-schlockfests starring Chuck Norris or Steven Seagal.

Other films that the CIA has provided assistance to include the 1992 film version of the Tom Clancy novel Patriot Games, and the 2003 movie, The Recruit. According to director Roger Donaldson, when the Agency commits to providing their support to a project, that can include letting a photographer shoot stills to help in designing sets, or, in certain instances, having the actors spend time in the building. By visiting Langley, the director says, he came to "understand how the space worked and looked. I needed a real sense of how a new person would feel when they saw the place for the first time."

In 2012, Tricia Jenkins released a book, The CIA in Hollywood: How the Agency Shapes Film and Television, which further documented the CIA's efforts at manipulating its public image through entertainment media since the 1990s. The book explains that the CIA has used motion pictures to boost recruitment, mitigate public affairs disasters (like Aldrich Ames), bolster its own image, and even intimidate terrorists through disinformation campaigns.

== See also ==
- ChinaAngVirus disinformation campaign
- John M. Olin Foundation. From 1958 to 1966, the foundation was used to launder money for the CIA, which funded covert anti-communist propaganda
- Operation Mockingbird
- CIA and the Cultural Cold War
- Operation Earnest Voice
- Robertson Panel
