= John-F.-Kennedy-Platz =

Square in Berlin-Schöneberg

Coordinates: 52°29′06″N 13°20′40″E

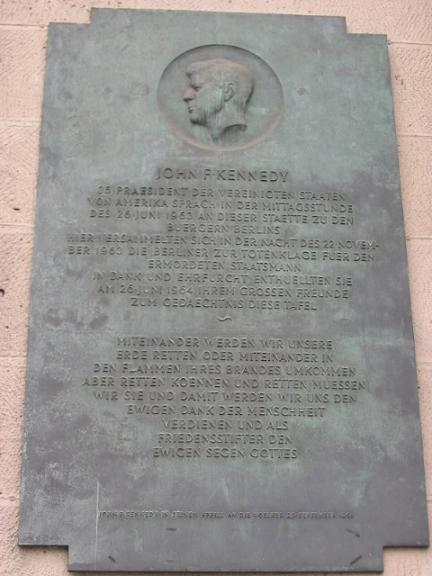
Plaque commemorating Kennedy's speech next to the front entrance of Rathaus Schöneberg

John-F.-Kennedy-Platz (John F. Kennedy Square), formerly Rudolph-Wilde-Platz, in the Schöneberg section of Berlin is the square in front of the former city hall of West Berlin (Rathaus Schöneberg). It was here, on June 26, 1963, that US President John F. Kennedy gave his famous speech to the Berliners, in which he stated: "Ich bin ein Berliner". The square was renamed John-F.-Kennedy-Platz on 25 November 1963, three days after Kennedy's assassination, and a large plaque dedicated to Kennedy, mounted on wall next to the entrance to the city hall, was unveiled one year after Kennedy's speech.

== See also ==
- List of memorials to John F. Kennedy
