= Stadtrandsiedlung Malchow =

- Quarter of Berlin
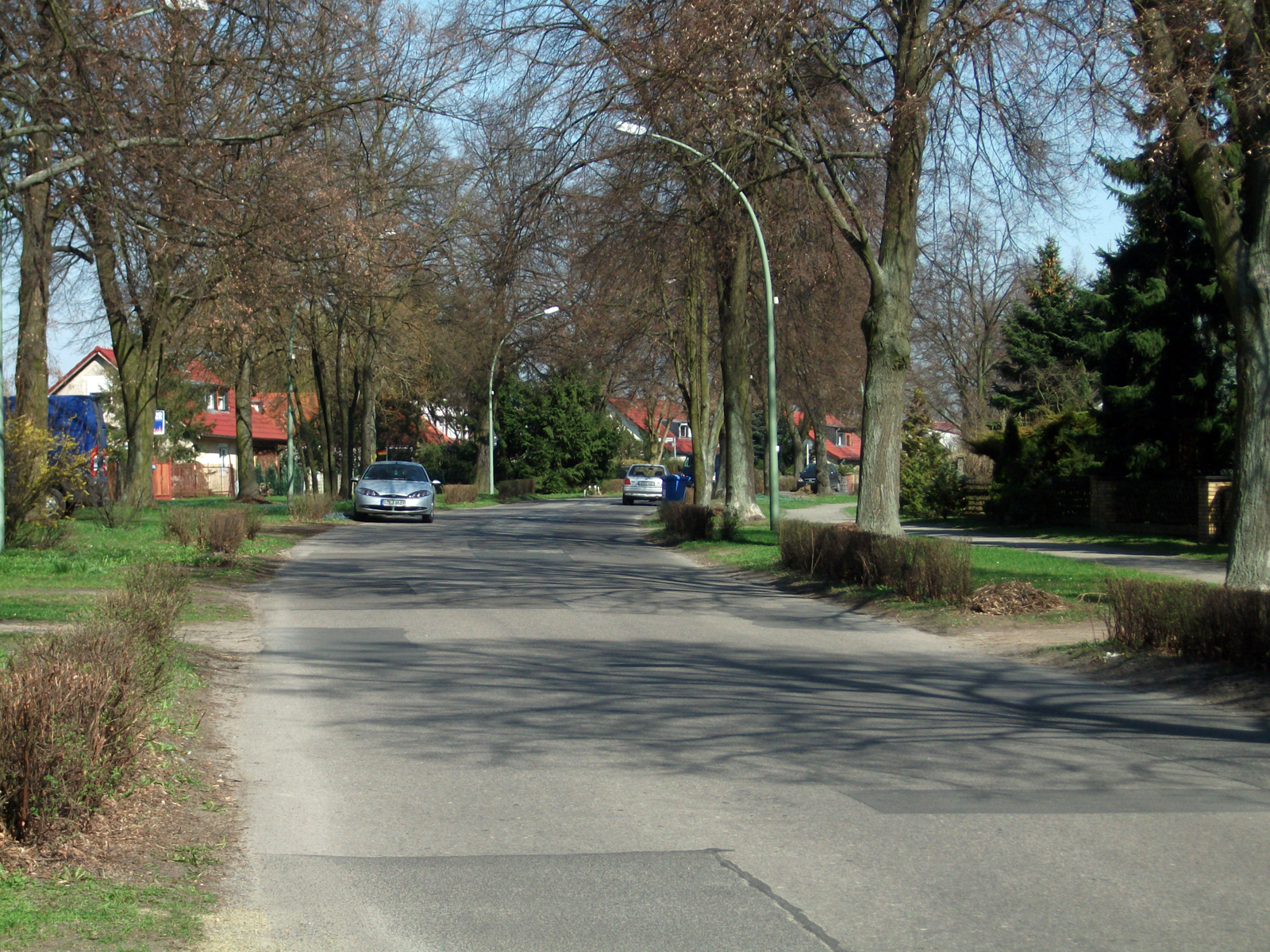
- Ortnitstraße

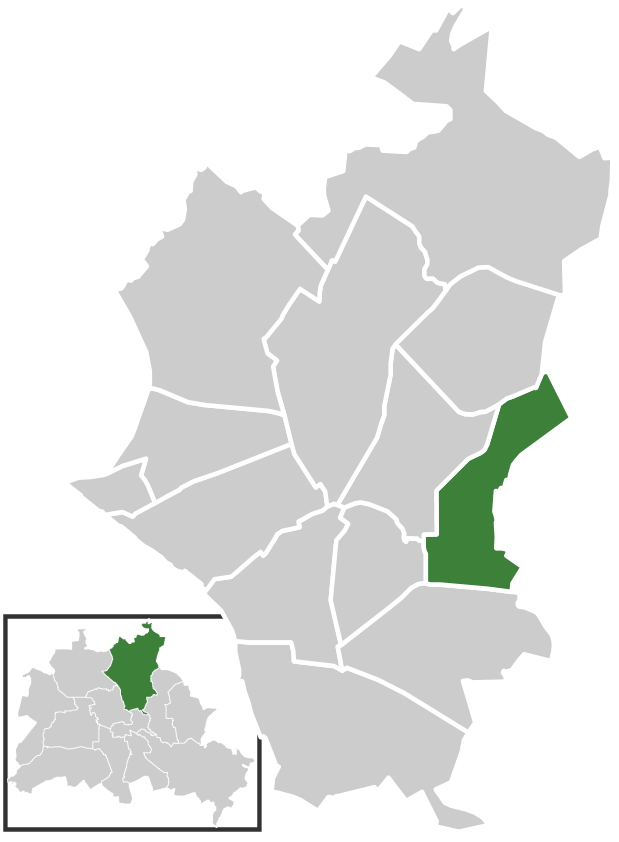
- Location of Stadtrandsiedlung Malchow in Pankow and Berlin
- Interactive map of Stadtrandsiedlung Malchow
- Location within Germany Location within Berlin
- Coordinates: 52°34′22″N 13°28′05″E
- Country: Germany
- State: Berlin
- City: Berlin
- Borough: Pankow
- Founded: 1344

Area
  - Total: 5.68 km^{2} (2.19 sq mi)
- Elevation: 60 m (200 ft)

Population (2024-12-31)
  - Total: 1,088
  - Density: 192/km^{2} (496/sq mi)
- Time zone: UTC+01:00 (CET)
  - Summer (DST): UTC+02:00 (CEST)
- Postal codes: 13051
- Vehicle registration: B

Stadtrandsiedlung Malchow (German: [ˈʃtatˌʁantˈziːdlʊŋ ˈmalçoː]) is a German locality within the Berlin borough of Pankow. Until 2001 it was part of the former Weißensee borough.

== History ==
The history of this locality is related to the neighboring quarter of Malchow. Originally the Siedlung was a civil parish in it, and Malchow an autonomous Prussian municipality of Brandenburg. In 1920 they were merged into Berlin by the "Greater Berlin Act". From 1936 to 1939 the northern area of the locality was used as a sewage farm.

== Geography ==
Located in the north-western suburb of Berlin, Stadtrandsiedlung Malchow borders with the Brandenburger municipality of Ahrensfelde, in the district of Barnim. The Berliner localities bordering with the Siedlung are Karow, Blankenburg, Heinersdorf, Weißensee and, in Lichtenberg borough, Neu-Hohenschönhausen, Malchow and Wartenberg.

== Transport ==
The locality is crossed in the north by the Außenring railway line, but is not served by any station. A big project planned for the S-Bahn in 2015 would extend the S75 line on the Außenring from the end station of Wartenberg to Karow. A station serving both Malchows, although hypothesized, is still not officially scheduled on the plan.

A road crossing the southern side of the residential area, Malchower Chaussee, is part of the B2, the German longest federal highway.

== Gallery ==
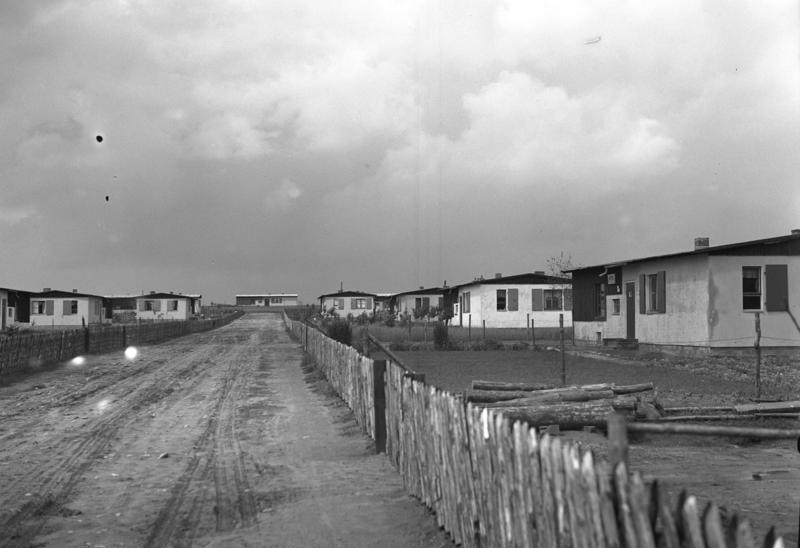
The village in 1930

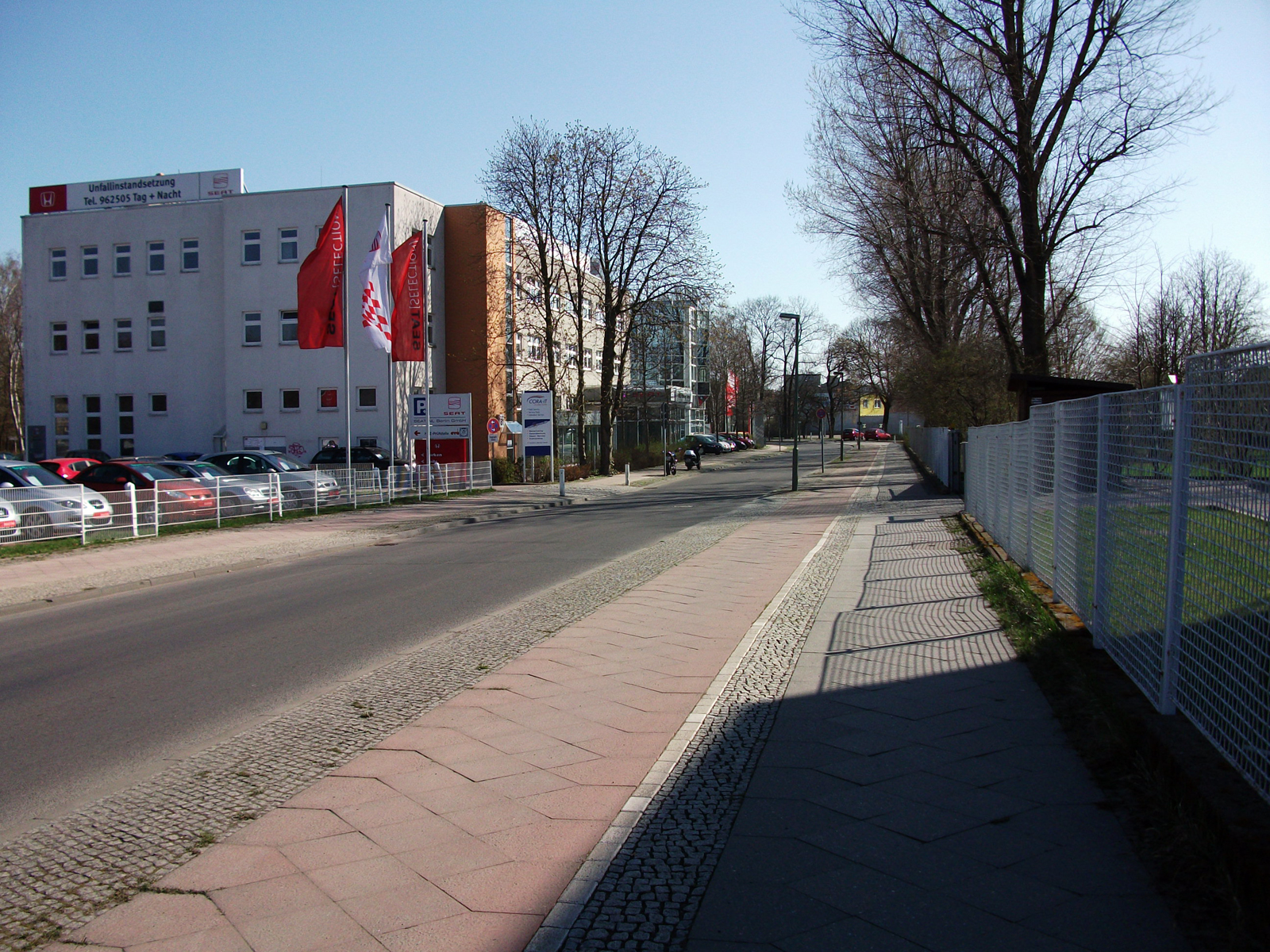
The street Nachtalbenweg

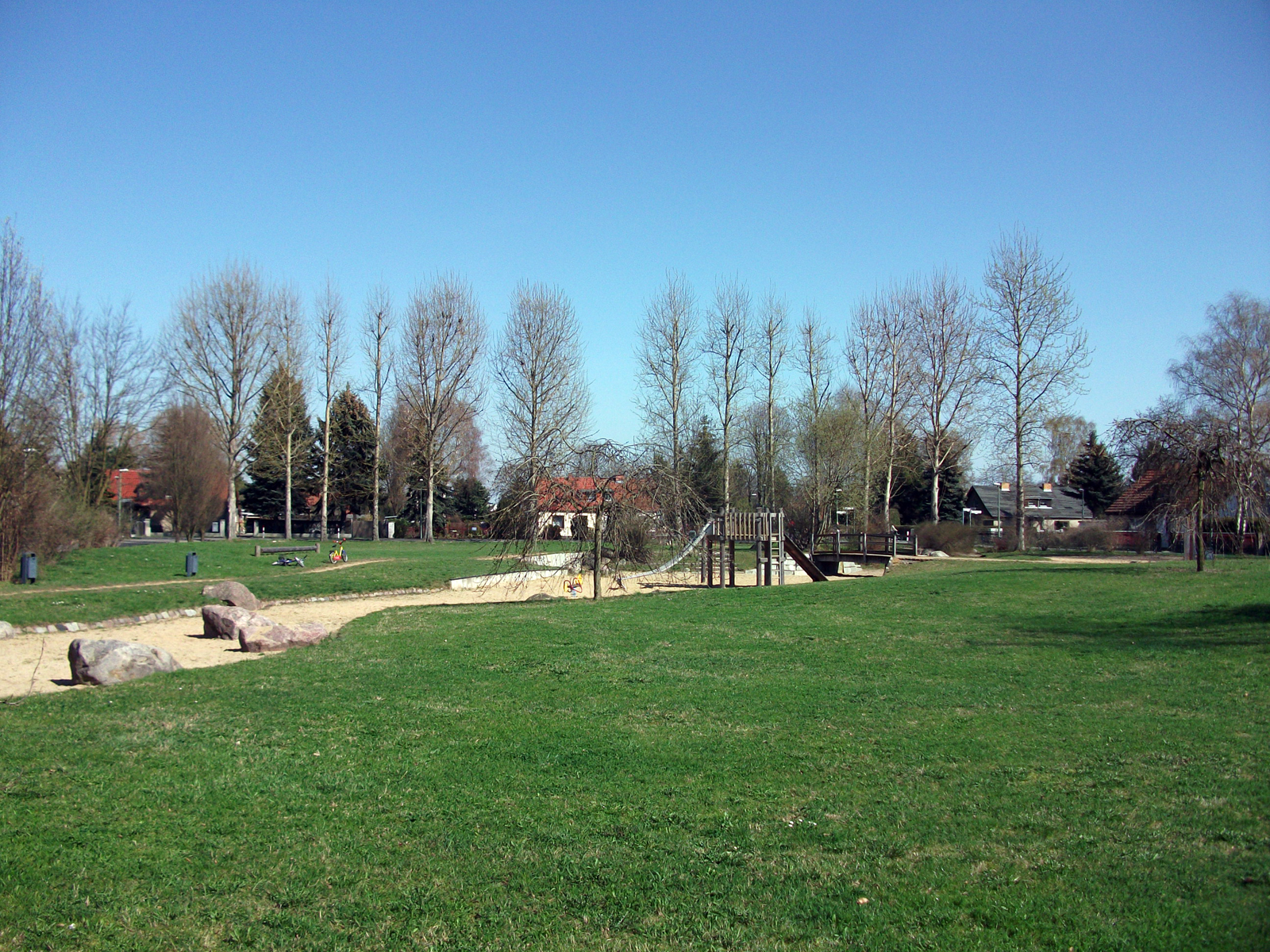
A park in Ullerplatz
