= Neu-Hohenschönhausen =

- Quarter of Berlin
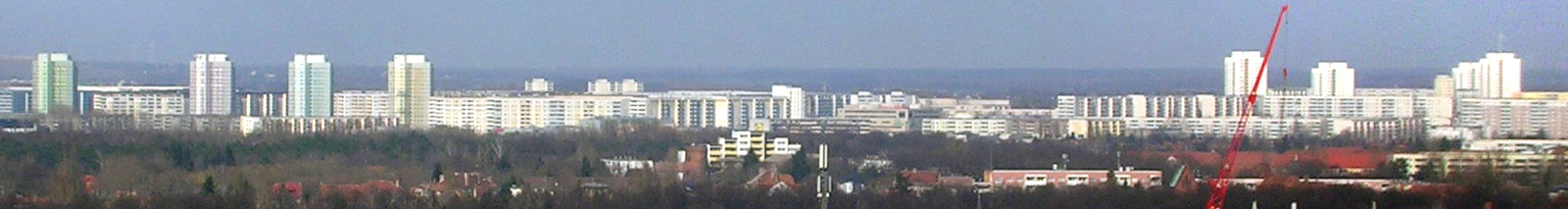
- Skyline of Neu-Hohenschönhausen

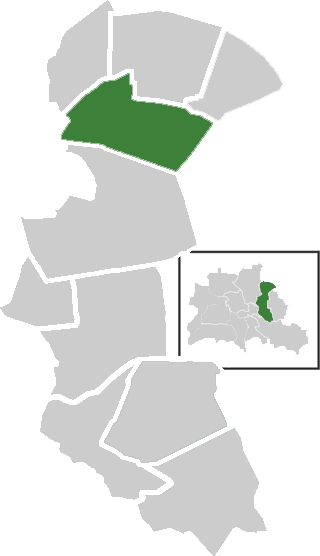
- Location of Neu-Hohenschönhausen in Lichtenberg district and Berlin
- Interactive map of Neu-Hohenschönhausen
- Location within Germany Location within Berlin
- Coordinates: 52°33′48″N 13°30′18″E
- Country: Germany
- State: Berlin
- City: Berlin
- Borough: Lichtenberg
- Founded: 1230
- Subdivisions: 4 zones

Area
  - Total: 5.16 km^{2} (1.99 sq mi)
- Elevation: 52 m (171 ft)

Population (2024-12-31)
  - Total: 59,200
  - Density: 11,500/km^{2} (29,700/sq mi)
- Time zone: UTC+01:00 (CET)
  - Summer (DST): UTC+02:00 (CEST)
- Postal codes: 13051, 13053, 13057, 13059
- Vehicle registration: B

Neu-Hohenschönhausen (German: [ˈnɔʏ ˌhoːənʃøːnˈhaʊzn̩], lit. 'New Hohenschönhausen') is a German locality (Ortsteil) in the borough (Bezirk) of Lichtenberg, Berlin. Until 2001 it was part of the former Hohenschönhausen borough.

== History ==
As early as the 19th century, the name Neu-Hohenschönhausen was applied to a settlement west of the old village of Hohenschönhausen, now occupied by the Sportforum and its surrounding neighborhood. Today this area bears a different name.

== Geography ==
=== Position ===
Neu-Hohenschönhausen is located in the north-eastern part of Berlin. It borders with the localities of Malchow, Falkenberg, Wartenberg, Alt-Hohenschönhausen, Weißensee, Stadtrandsiedlung Malchow (both in Pankow district) and Marzahn (in Marzahn-Hellersdorf district).

=== Subdivision ===
The locality is divided into 4 zones (Ortsgebiete):

- Neubaugebiet Krummer Pfuhl
- Neubaugebiet Vincent-van-Gogh-Straße
- Neubaugebiet Mühlengrund
- Neubaugebiet Zingster Straße

== Transport ==
The locality is served by tram lines M4, M5 and M17 of the Berlin tram network and by the S-Bahn stations of Hohenschönhausen (S75 line and Regionalbahn regional rail), Gehrenseestraße (S75) and Wartenberg (S75).

== Photogallery ==
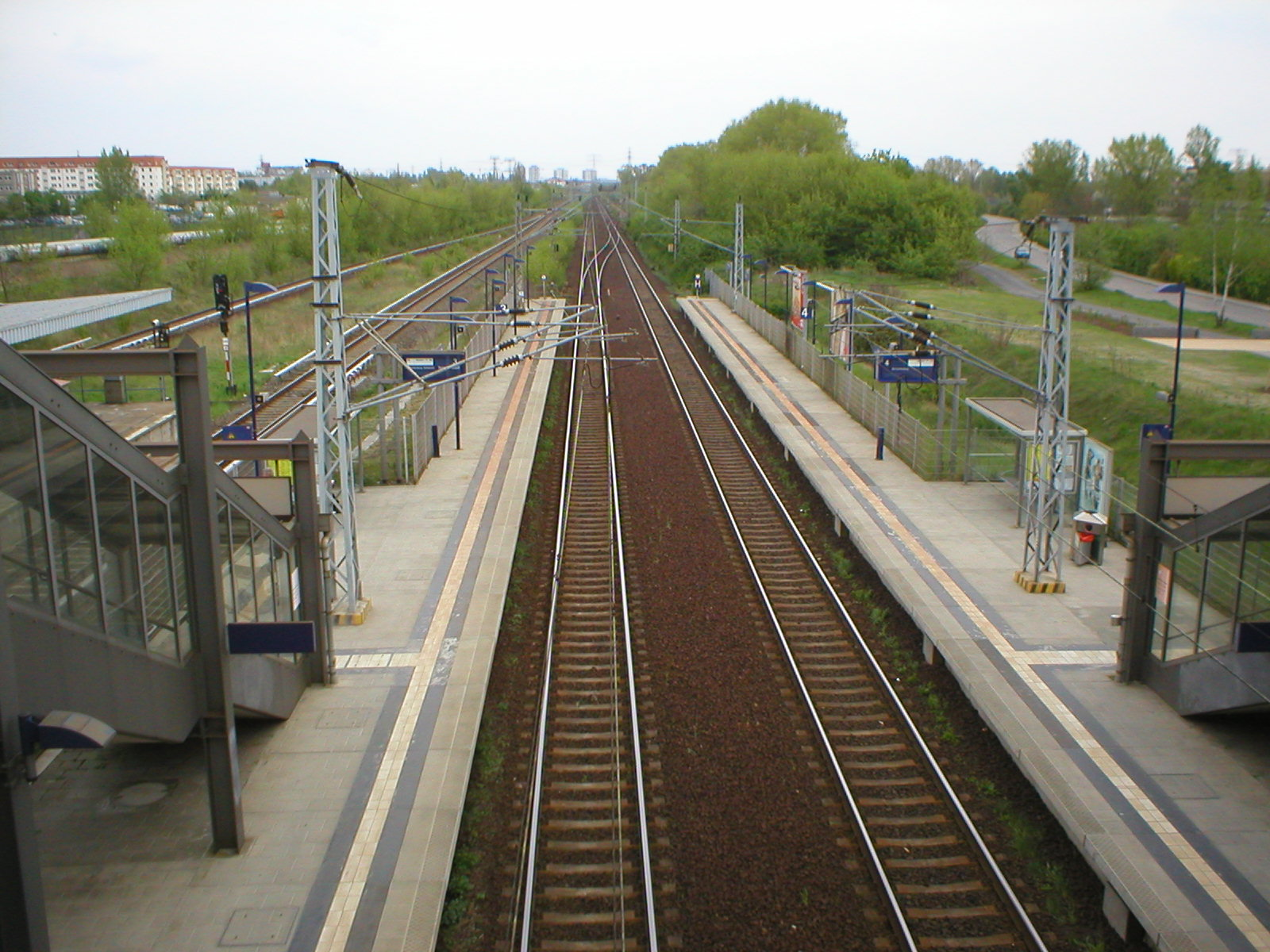
S-Bahn and Regionalbahn station Berlin Hohenschönhausen

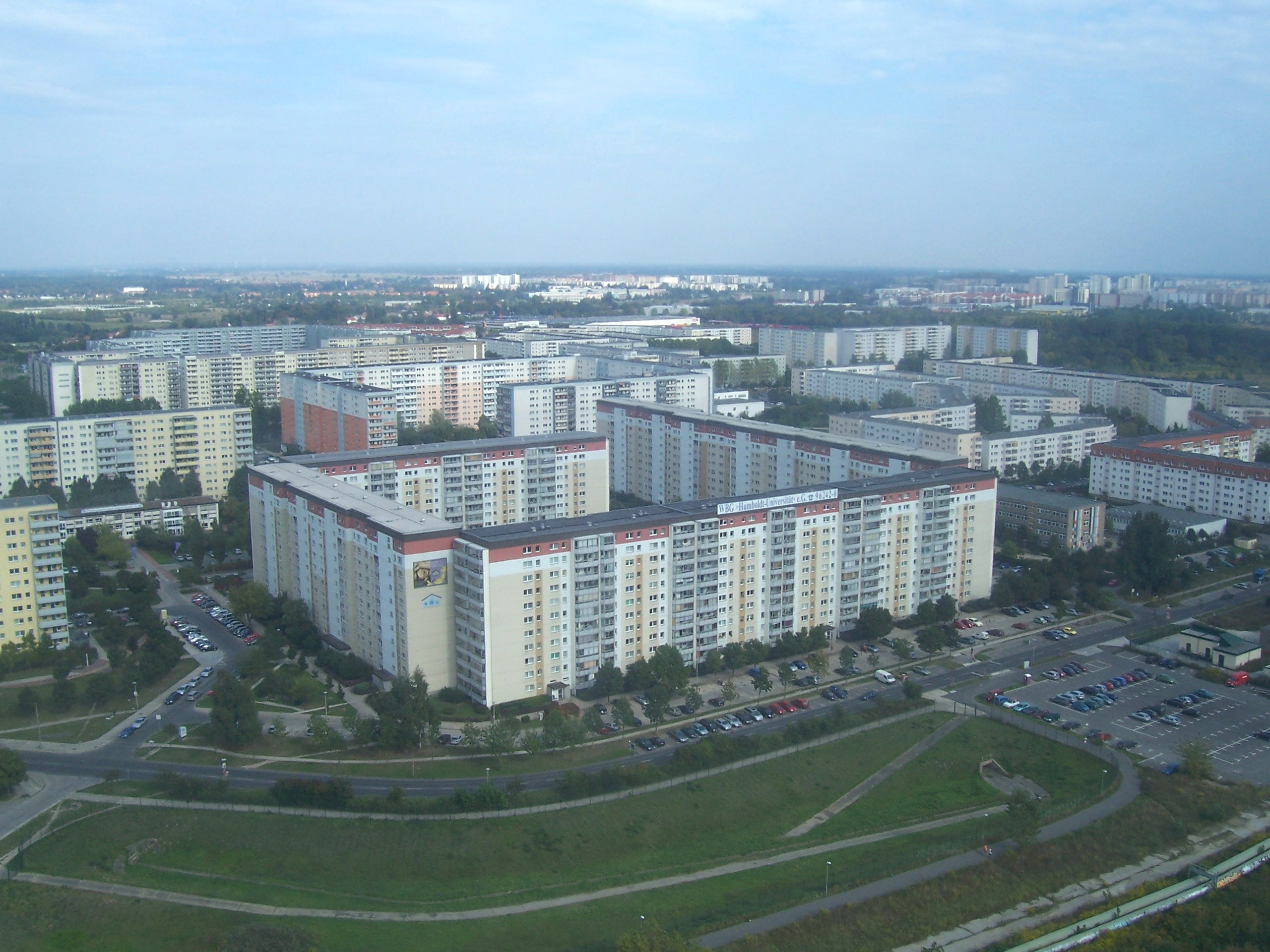
The building complex Neubaugebiet of Vincent-van-Gogh-Straße and Pablo-Picasso-Straße

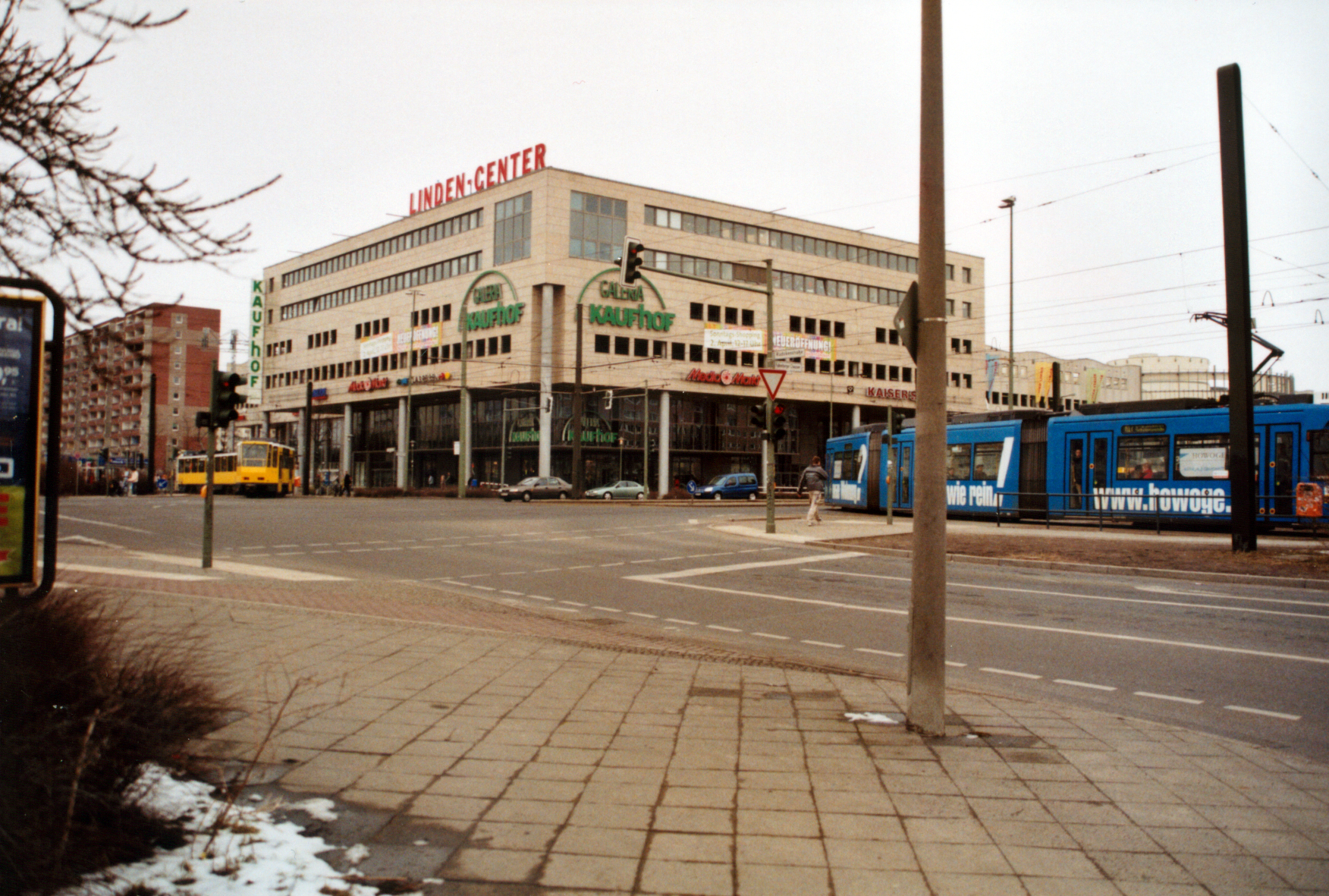
Prerower Platz

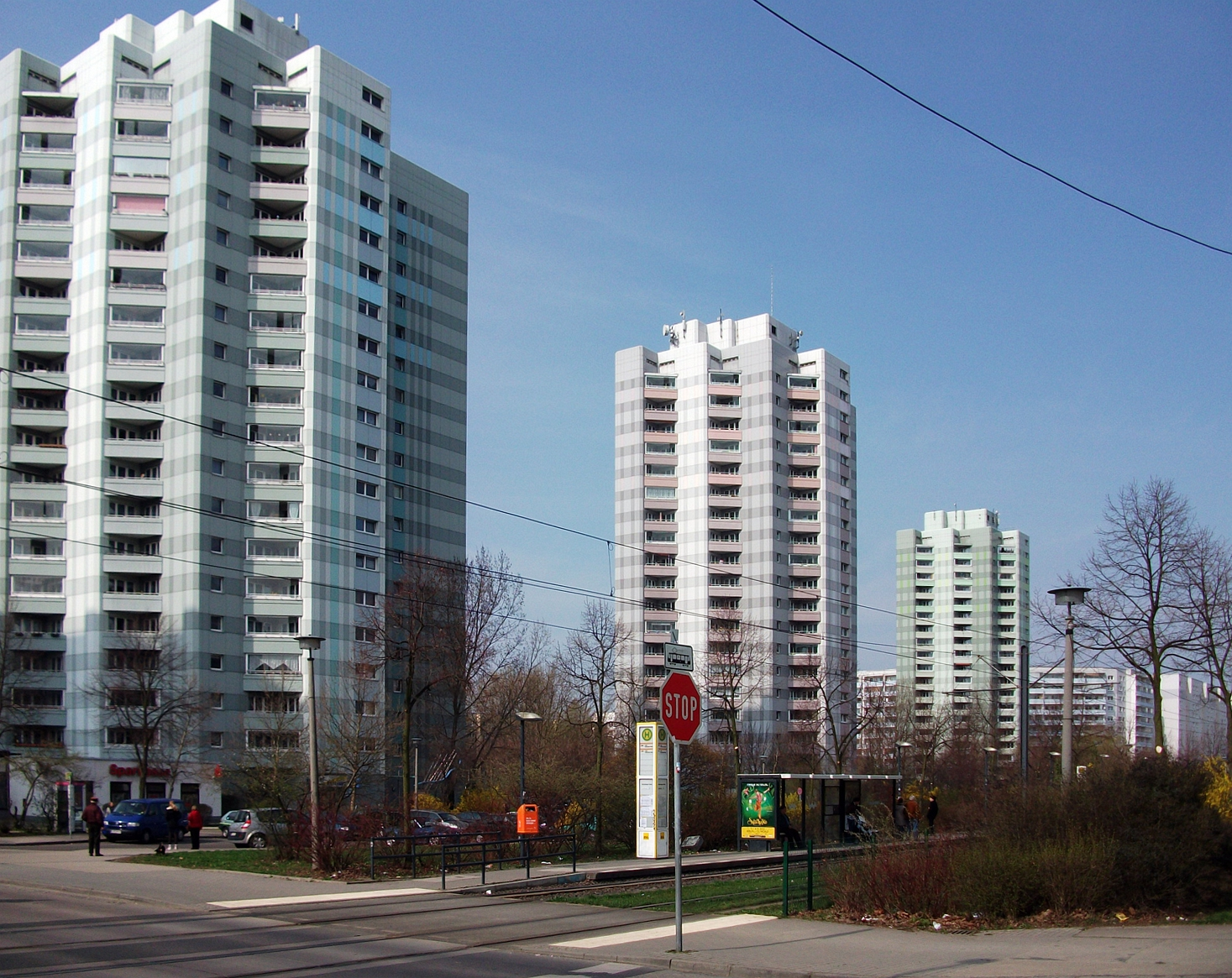
Buildings at Zingster Straße

== Literature ==
- Walter Püschel: "Spaziergänge in Hohenschönhausen" - Haude & Spenersche Verlagsbuchhandlung GmbH, Berlin 1995. ISBN 3-7759-0398-4
