= Wartenberg (Berlin) =

- Quarter of Berlin
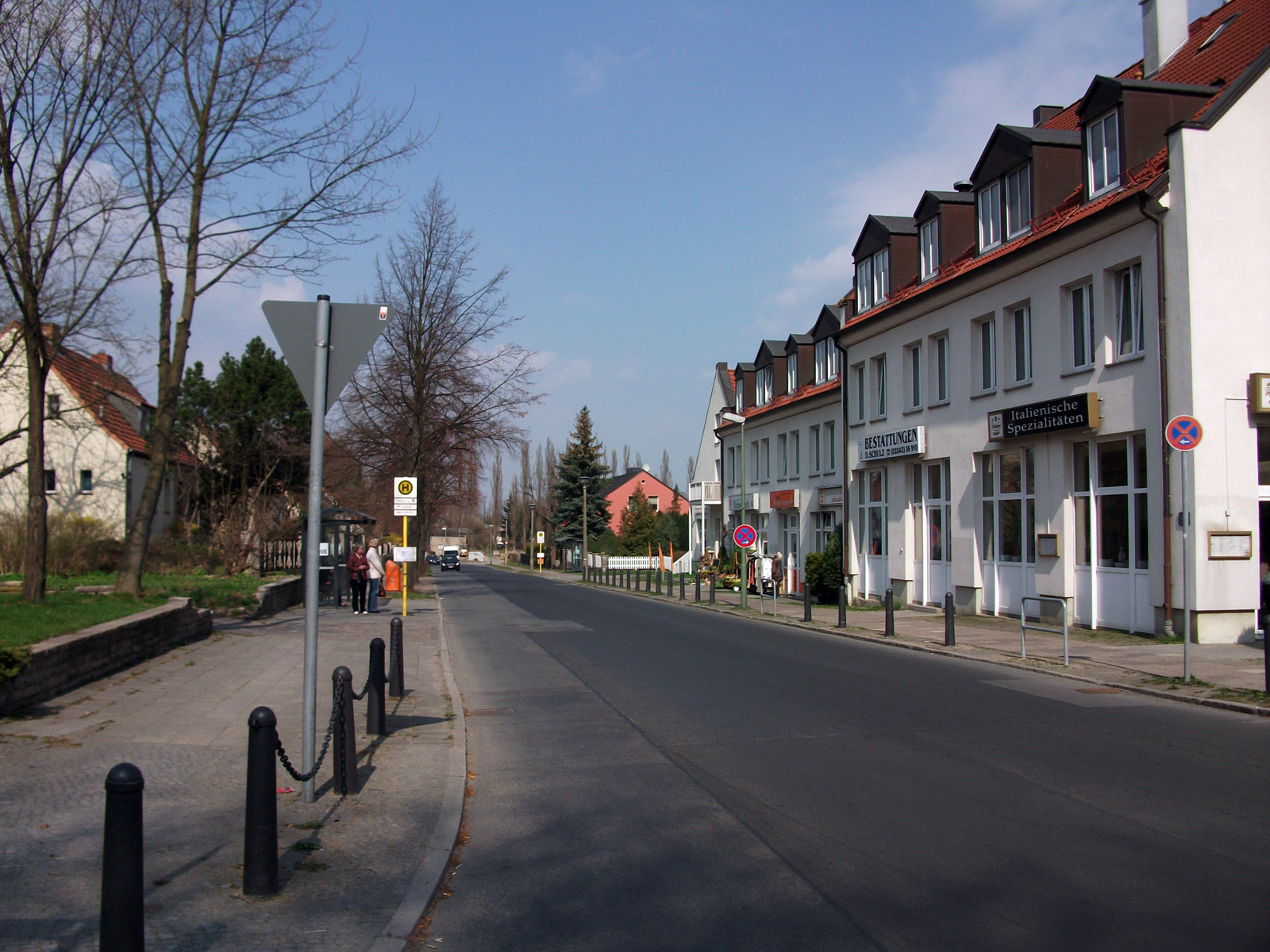
- Linderberger Straße

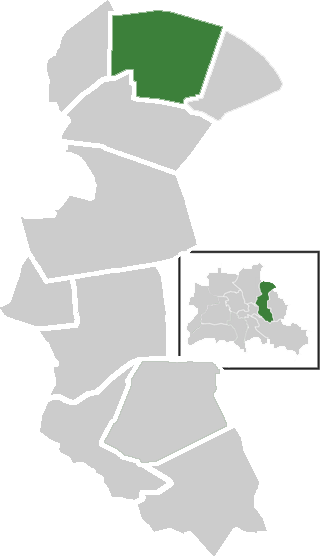
- Location of Wartenberg in Lichtenberg district and Berlin
- Interactive map of Wartenberg
- Location within Germany Location within Berlin
- Coordinates: 52°34′29″N 13°31′05″E
- Country: Germany
- State: Berlin
- City: Berlin
- Borough: Lichtenberg
- Founded: 1270
- Subdivisions: 4 zones

Area
  - Total: 6.92 km^{2} (2.67 sq mi)
- Elevation: 60 m (200 ft)

Population (2024-12-31)
  - Total: 2,669
  - Density: 386/km^{2} (999/sq mi)
- Time zone: UTC+01:00 (CET)
  - Summer (DST): UTC+02:00 (CEST)
- Postal codes: 13059
- Vehicle registration: B

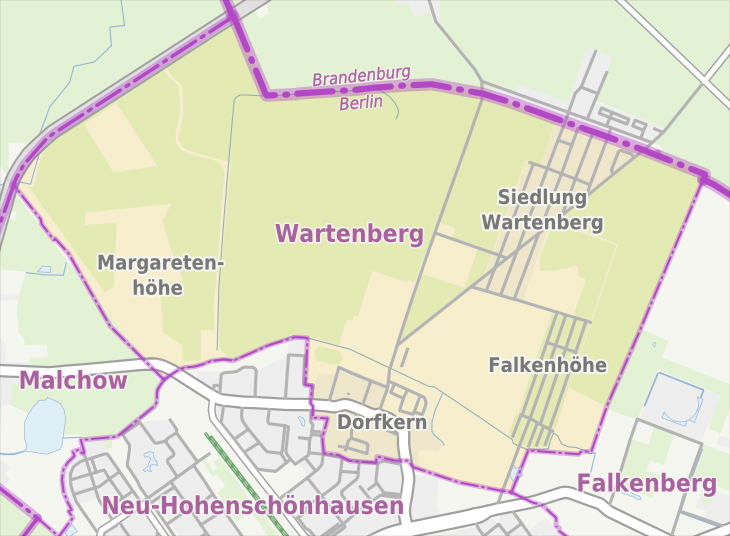
Map of the locality

Wartenberg (German: [ˈvaʁtn̩bɛʁk]) is a German locality (Ortsteil) within the borough (Bezirk) of Lichtenberg, Berlin. Until 2001 it was part of the former borough of Hohenschönhausen.

== History ==
The locality was established in the course of the German Ostsiedlung after the establishment of the Margraviate of Brandenburg by Albert the Bear in 1157. It was first mentioned in a 1270 margravial deed as Wardenberge and again in the 1375 domesday book of Emperor Charles IV. The estates of Wartenberg manor were acquired by the City of Berlin in 1882. Until 1920, it was a municipality in the former Niederbarnim district of the Prussian Brandenburg Province, then merged into Berlin with the "Greater Berlin Act".

== Geography ==
=== Overview ===
Wartenberg is located in the north-eastern suburb of Berlin and borders with the Brandenburger village of Lindenberg (part of Ahrensfelde municipality), in Barnim district. It borders with the Berliner localities of Falkenberg, Neu-Hohenschönhausen, Malchow and Stadtrandsiedlung Malchow (in Pankow).

=== Subdivision ===
Wartenberg is divided into 4 zones (Ortslagen):

- Dorfkern (centre)
- Falkenhöhe
- Margaretenhöhe
- Siedlung Wartenberg

== Transport ==
The locality is served by the S-Bahn line S75 at Wartenberg station, located in Neu-Hohenschönhausen. The tramway terminal stop "Falkenberg" (lines M4 and M17) is not too far from Dorfkern and Falkenhöhe and the bus lines 256, 359 and 893 cross the settlement.

== Photogallery ==
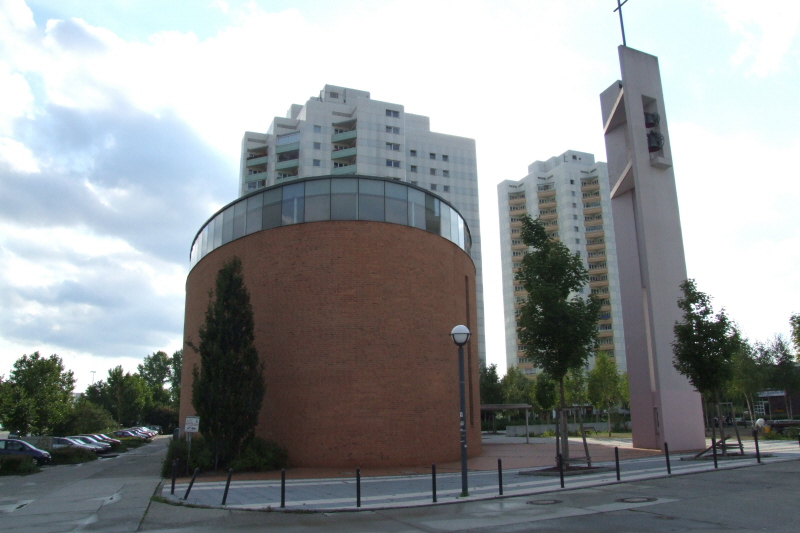
New village church

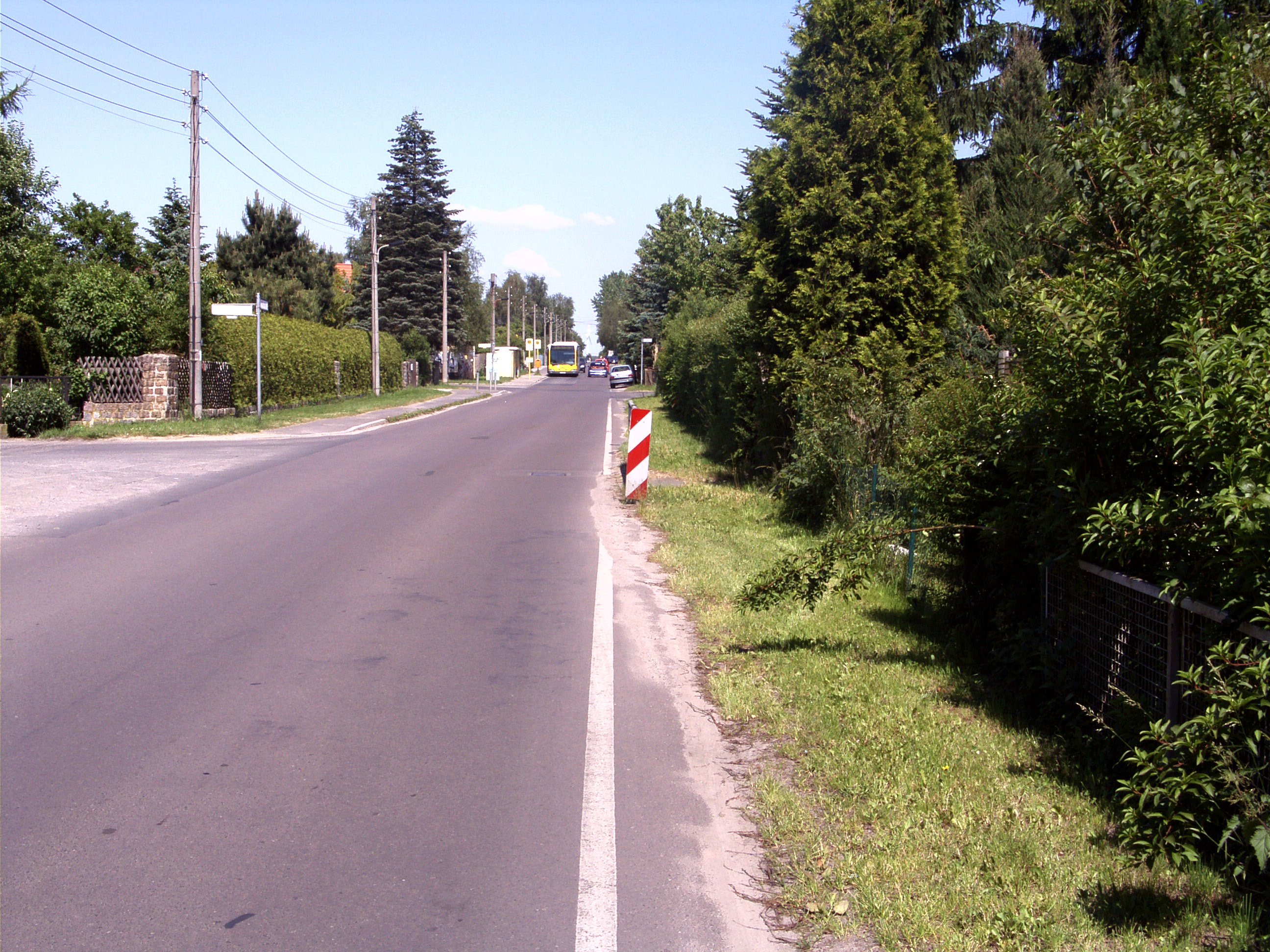
Siedlung Wartenberg

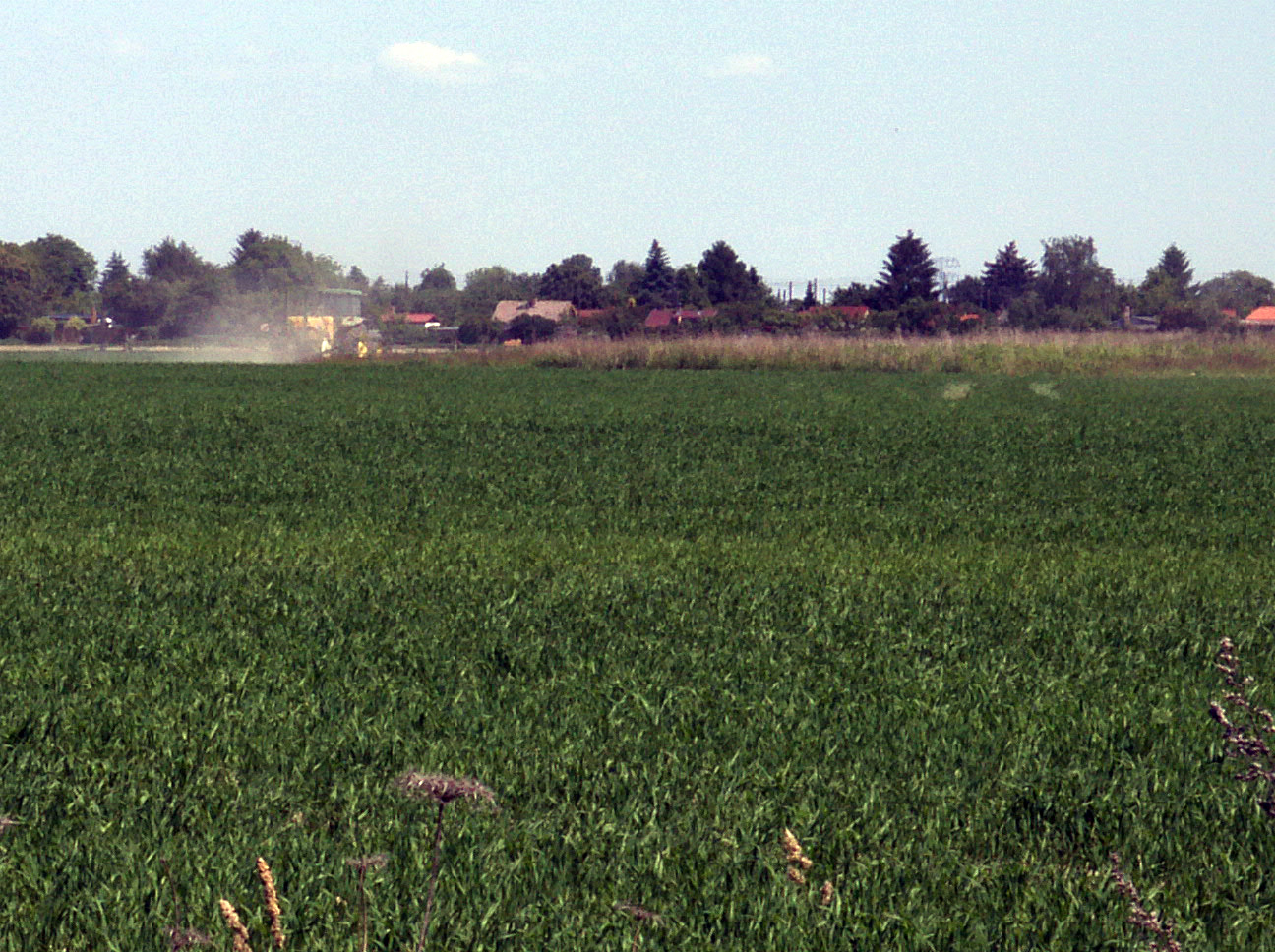
Dorfkern and Siedlung Wartenberg
