= Malchow (Berlin) =

- Quarter of Berlin
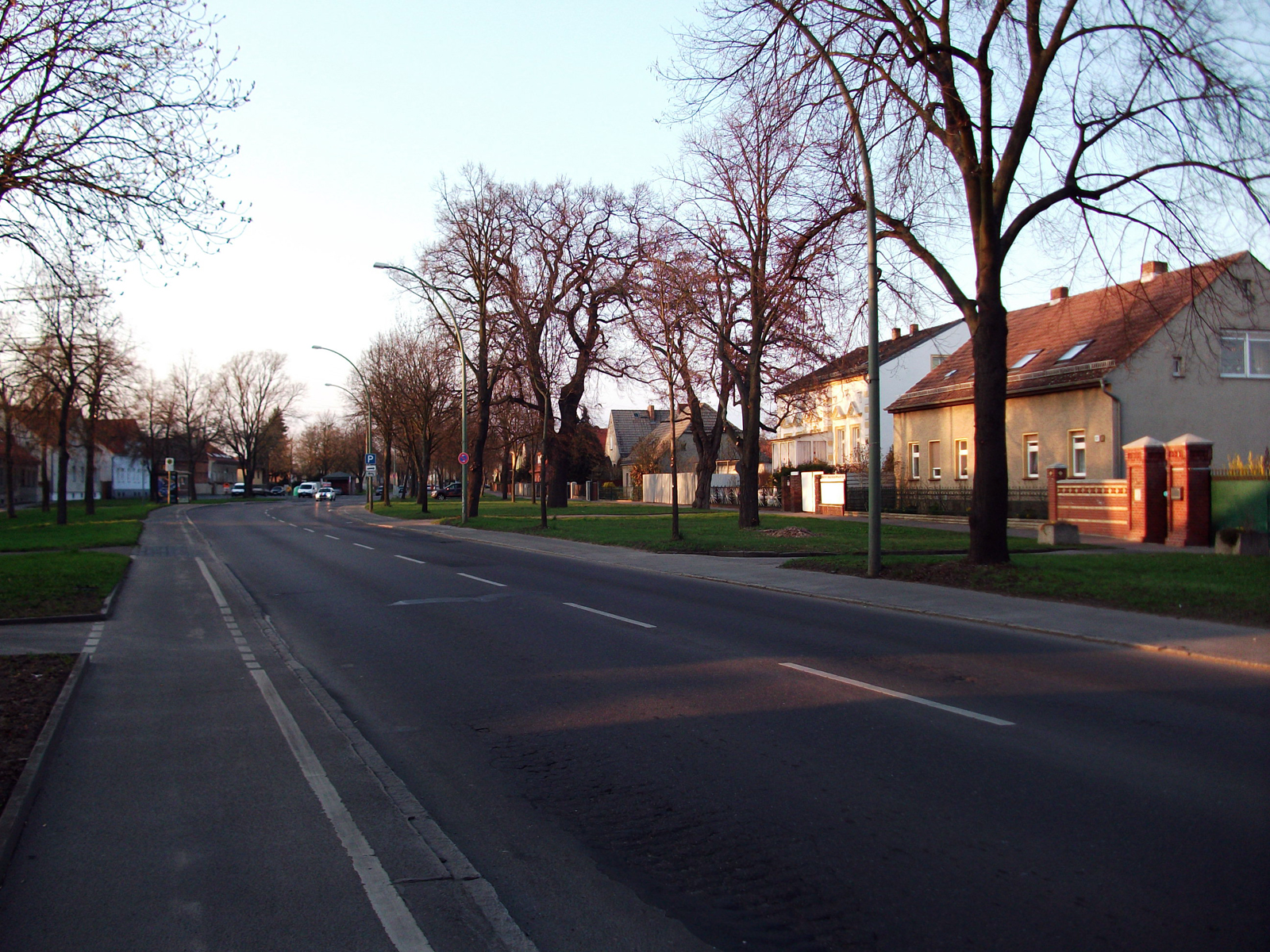
- View of the Dorfstraße

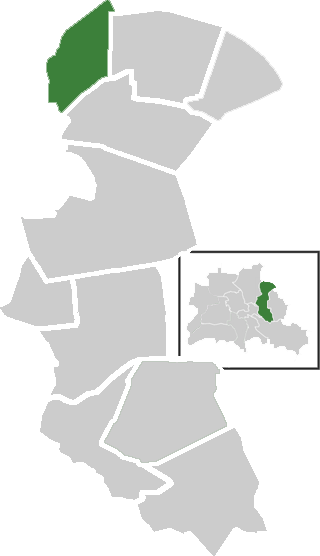
- Location of Malchow in Lichtenberg district and Berlin
- Interactive map of Malchow
- Location within Germany Location within Berlin
- Coordinates: 52°34′45″N 13°28′57″E
- Country: Germany
- State: Berlin
- City: Berlin
- Borough: Lichtenberg
- Founded: 1344

Area
  - Total: 1.54 km^{2} (0.59 sq mi)
- Elevation: 60 m (200 ft)

Population (2024-12-31)
  - Total: 612
  - Density: 397/km^{2} (1,030/sq mi)
- Time zone: UTC+01:00 (CET)
  - Summer (DST): UTC+02:00 (CEST)
- Postal codes: 13051
- Vehicle registration: B

Malchow (German: [ˈmalçoː]) is a German locality (Ortsteil) in the borough (Bezirk) of Lichtenberg, Berlin. Until 2001 it was part of the former Hohenschönhausen borough. With a population of 450 (2008) it is the least-populated Berliner Ortsteil.

== History ==
The locality was first mentioned in 1344. Until 1920 it was an autonomous municipality merged into Berlin with the Greater Berlin Act. A former civil parish of it, Stadtrandsiedlung Malchow, was divided from Malchow in 1985, becoming an Ortsteil of the former borough of Weißensee (still part of Pankow district in 2001).

== Geography ==
Malchow is located in the north-eastern suburb of Berlin, and counts in its territory a little lake named Malchower See. It borders with the localities of Wartenberg, Neu-Hohenschönhausen and Stadtrandsiedlung Malchow.

== Transport ==
The locality, crossed by the Außenring railway line, is not served by any station. The nearest Berlin S-Bahn stop is Wartenberg, on S75 line, that ends there. It has been projected to continue the S75 track in 2015 on the Außenring from Wartenberg to Karow, but a station for Malchow, hypothesized, is still not officially scheduled on the plan.

The village's main road, Malchower Dorfstraße, is part of the B2, the German longest federal highway.

== Photogallery ==
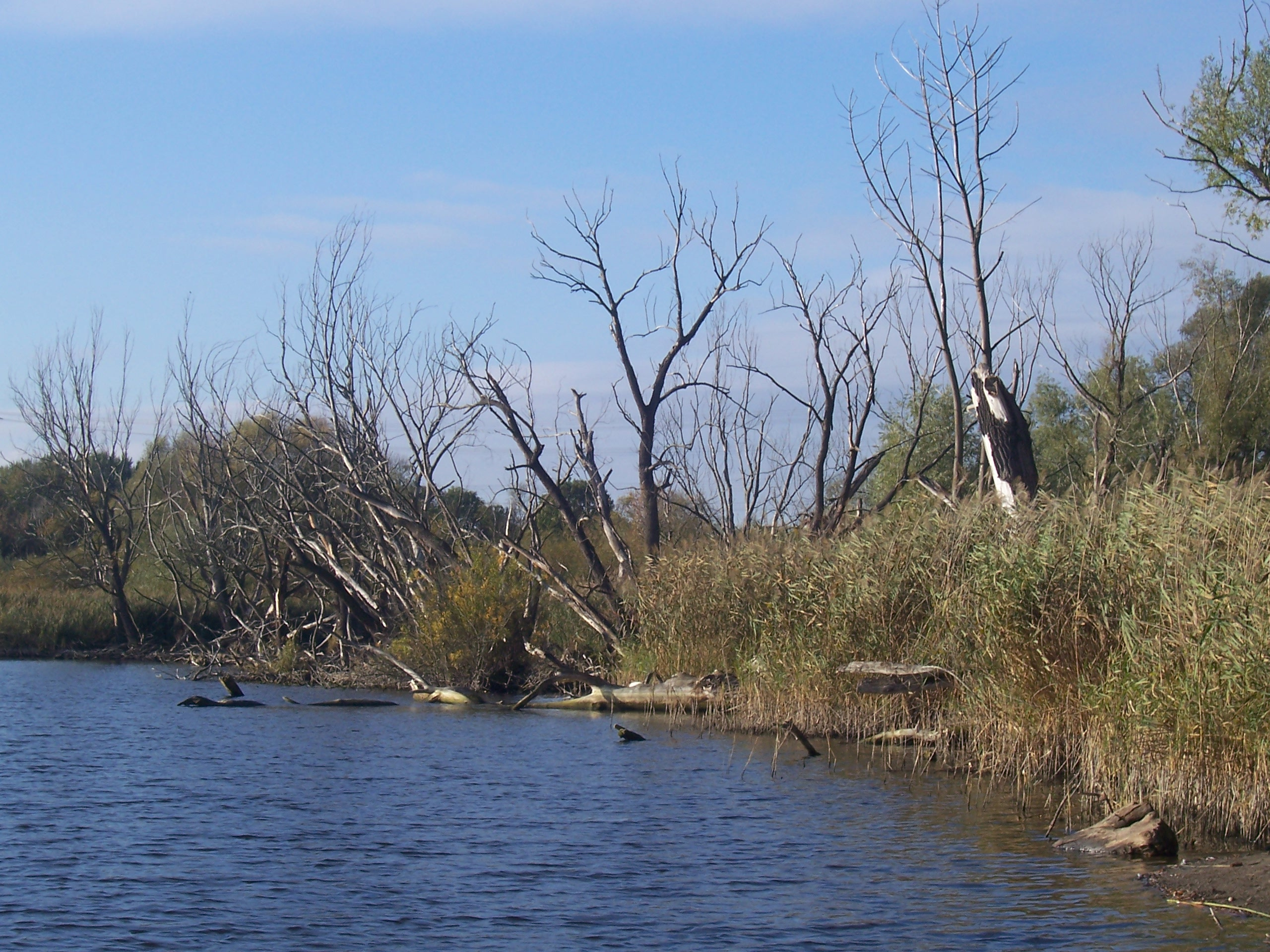
View of the Malchower See

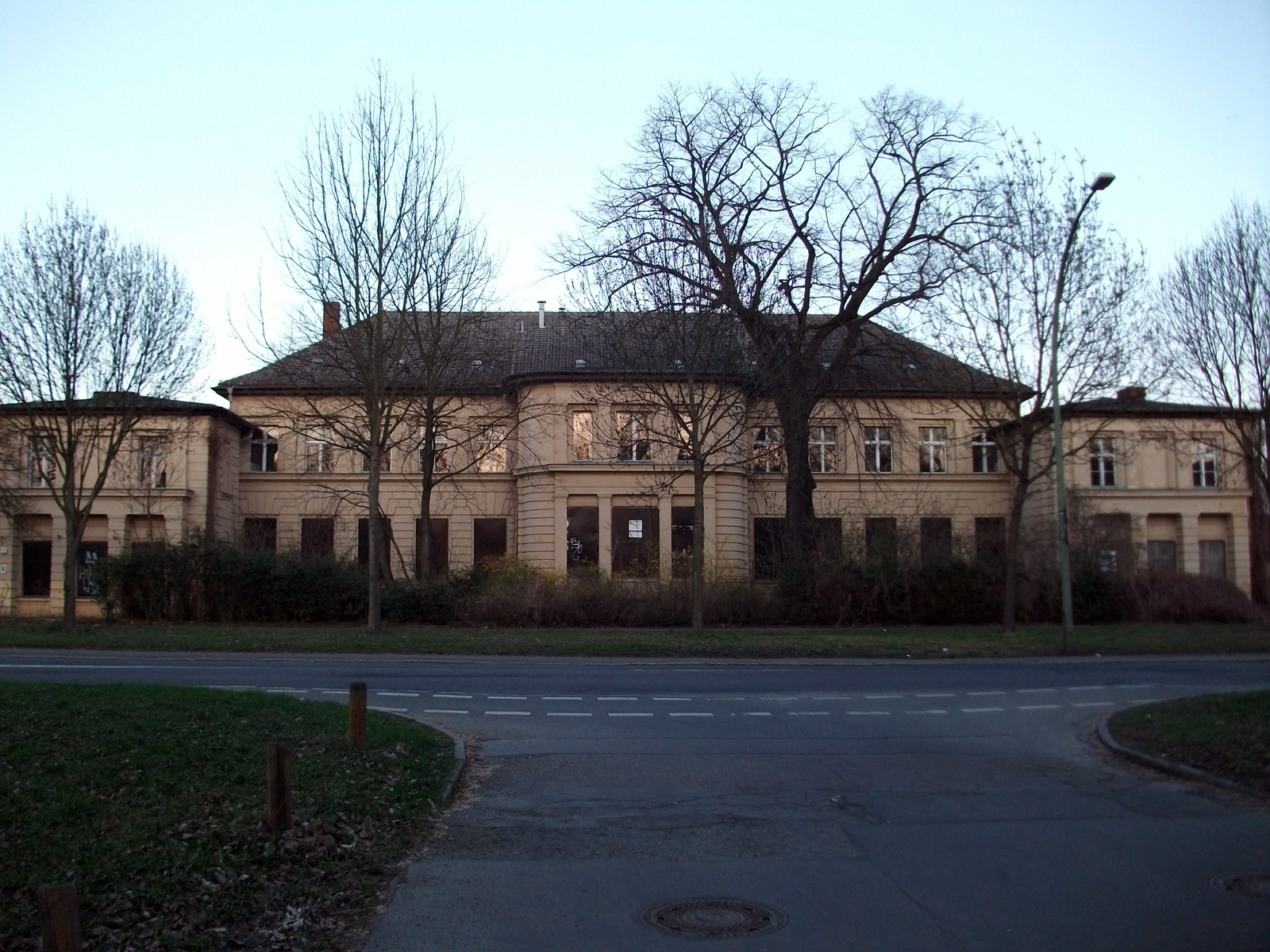
Malchow Gutshaus

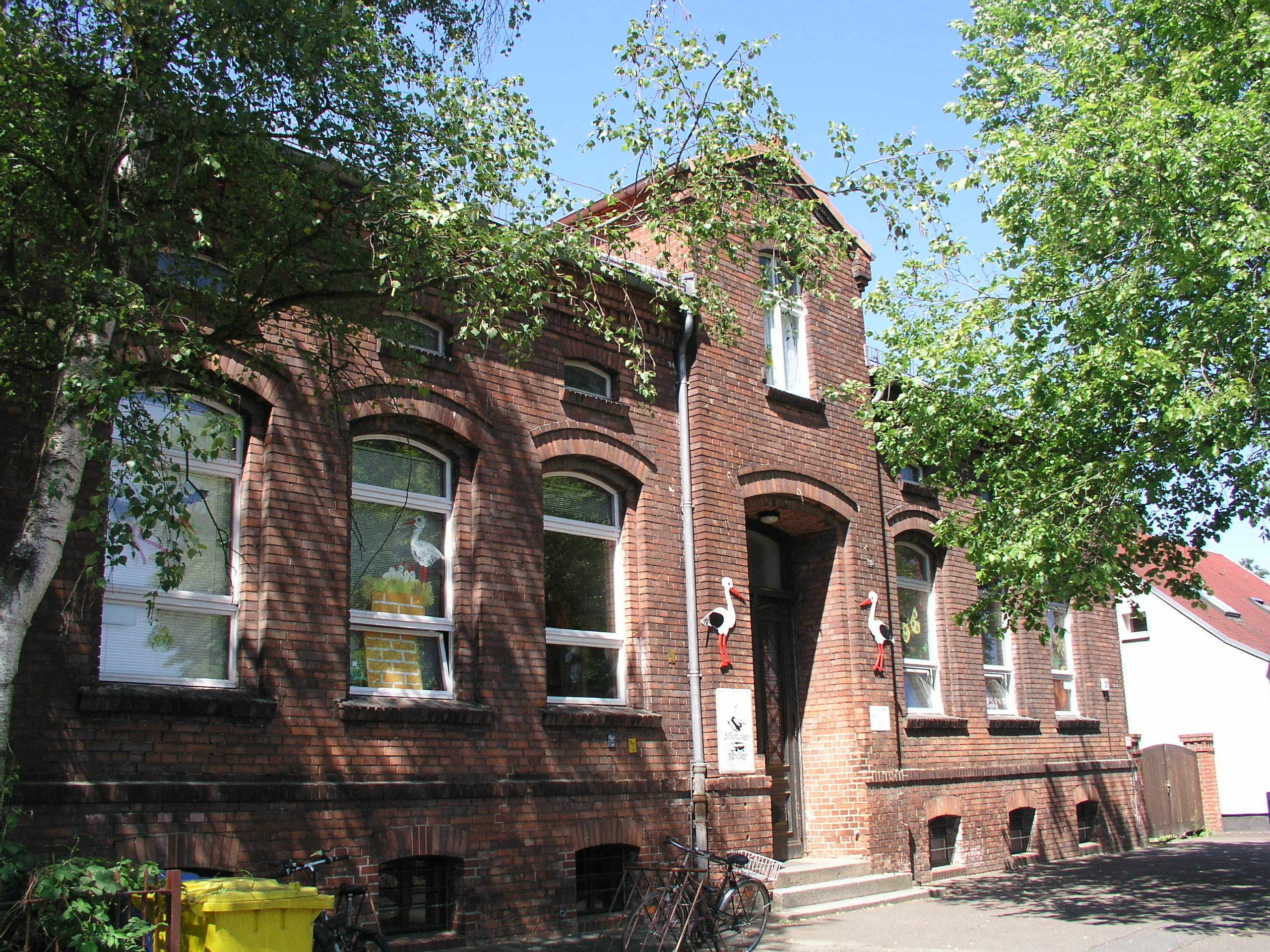
Kindergarten Malchow
