= Gehrenseestraße station =

Railway station in Lichtenberg, Germany

Coordinates: 52.5567°N 13.5245°E

Gehrenseestraße

General information
- Owner: DB Netz
- Operator: DB Station&Service
- Platforms: 1 island platform
- Tracks: 2
- Train operators: S-Bahn Berlin
- Connections: 294

Construction
- Accessible: no

Other information
- Station code: 2035
- DS100 code: BGSE
- IBNR: 8089014
- Category: 5
- Fare zone: VBB: Berlin B/5656
- Website: www.bahnhof.de

History
- Opened: 20 December 1984; 41 years ago

Services
Preceding station	Berlin S-Bahn	Following station
Springpfuhl towards Warschauer Straße	S75	Hohenschönhausen towards Wartenberg
Location

Gehrenseestraße is a railway station in the Lichtenberg district of Berlin. It is served by the S-Bahn line S75.
