= Falkenberg (Berlin) =

- Quarter of Berlin
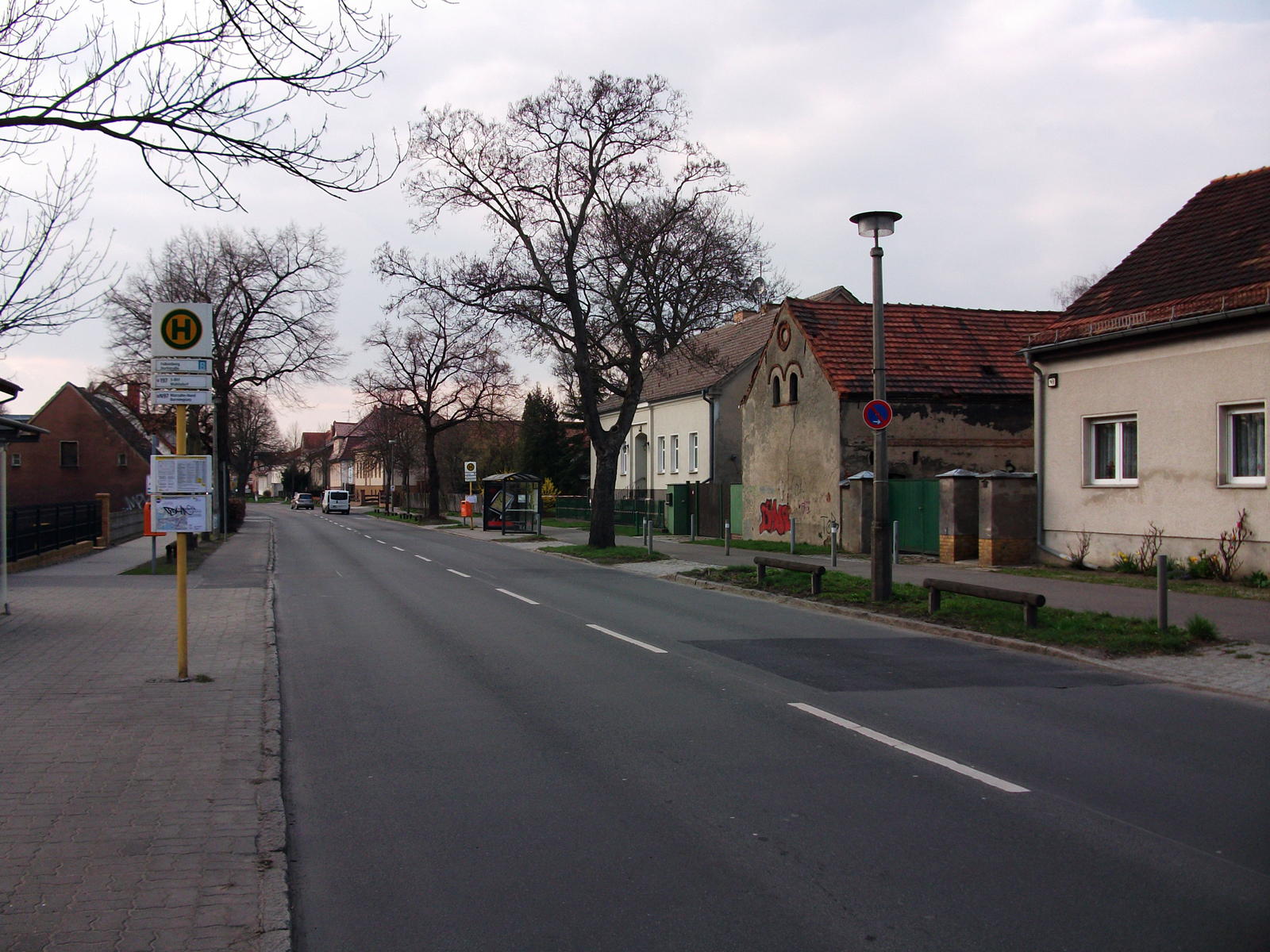
- View of Dorfstraße

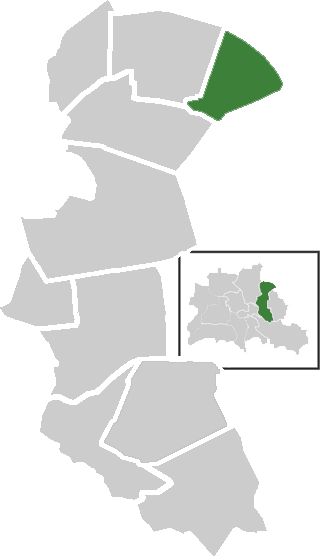
- Location of Falkenberg in Lichtenberg district and Berlin
- Interactive map of Falkenberg
- Location within Germany Location within Berlin
- Coordinates: 52°30′21″N 13°31′09″E
- Country: Germany
- State: Berlin
- City: Berlin
- Borough: Lichtenberg
- Founded: 1370

Area
  - Total: 3.06 km^{2} (1.18 sq mi)
- Elevation: 60 m (200 ft)

Population (2024-12-31)
  - Total: 3,095
  - Density: 1,010/km^{2} (2,620/sq mi)
- Time zone: UTC+01:00 (CET)
  - Summer (DST): UTC+02:00 (CEST)
- Postal codes: 13057
- Vehicle registration: B

Falkenberg (German: [ˈfalkŋ̍ˌbɛʁk]) is a German locality (Ortsteil) within the borough (Bezirk) of Lichtenberg, Berlin. Until 2001, it was part of the borough of Hohenschönhausen.

== History ==
The settlement, inhabited by farmers from the Barnim, was first mentioned in 1370 on a document of Otto V, Duke of Bavaria. Until 1920, it was a municipality of Niederbarnim district, merged into Berlin with the "Greater Berlin Act".

== Geography ==
Situated in northeastern suburb of Berlin, Falkenberg is bounded by the Brandenburger municipality of Ahrensfelde, in Barnim district. It borders with the Berliner localities of Wartenberg, Neu-Hohenschönhausen and Marzahn (in Marzahn-Hellersdorf).

== Transport ==
Falkenberg is not directly served by the S-Bahn, but the station of Berlin-Ahrensfelde (line S7) is not too far from the settlement. The tramway terminal stop "Falkenberg" (lines M4 and M17), located in Neu-Hohenschönhausen, also serves the locality. The Bus line 197 crosses Falkenberg and links it to this two stops.

== Photogallery ==
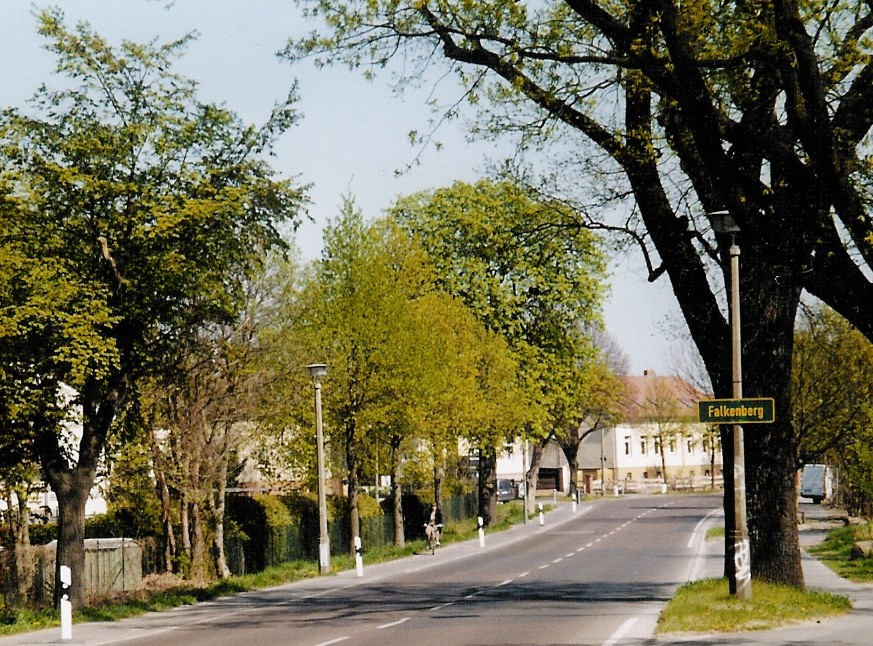
Entrance to Falkenberg

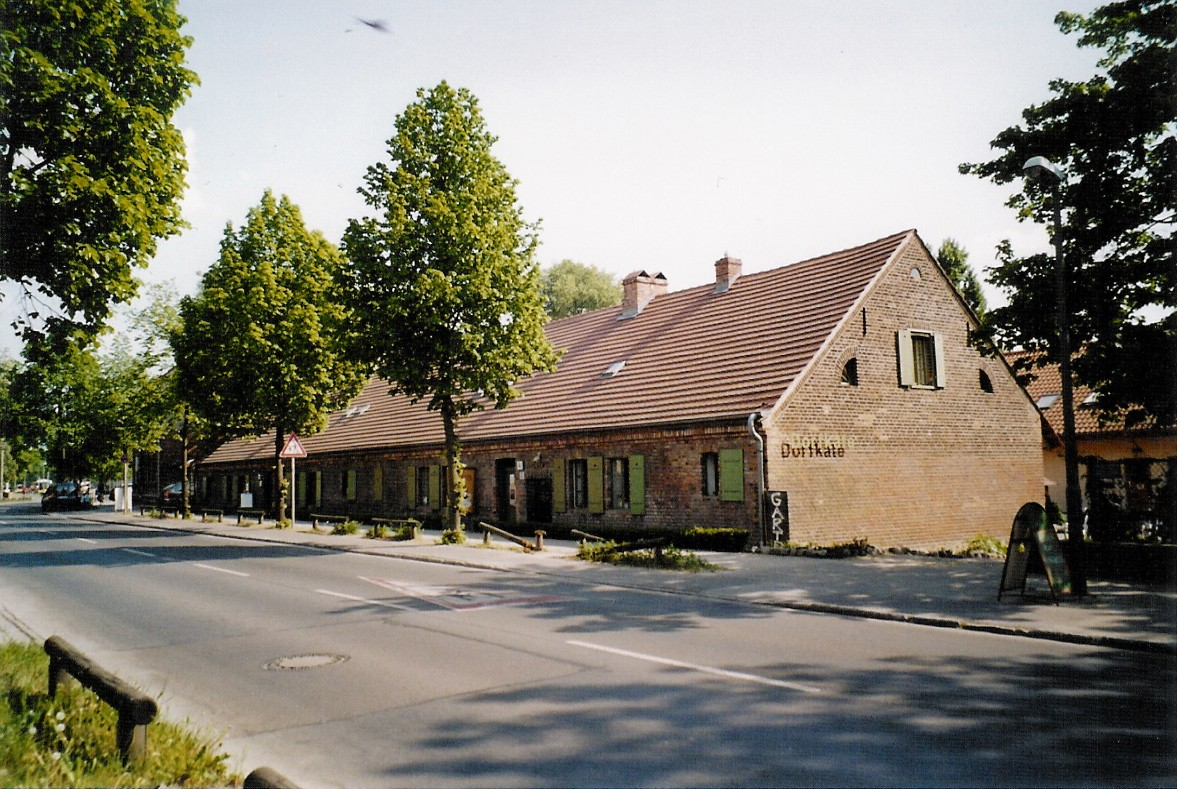
Dorfkate building

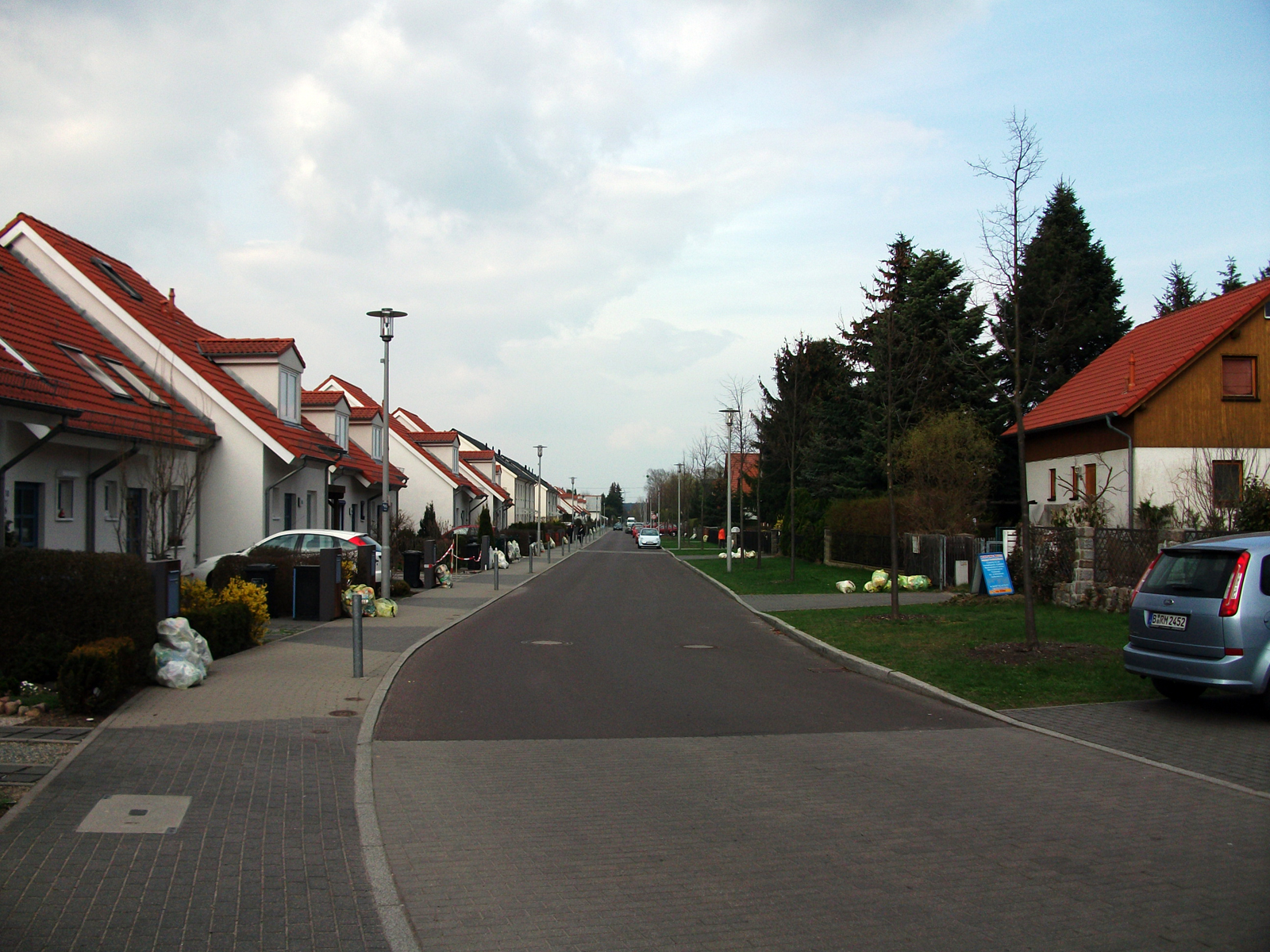
Marie-Elisabeth von Humboldt Straße
