= Daniela Ehlers =

German politician (born 1992)

Member of the Berlin House of Representatives
- Incumbent
- Assumed office 29 October 2026

Personal details
- Born: 1992 (age 33–34)
- Party: Alliance 90/The Greens (since 2010)

Daniela Ehlers (born 1992) is a German politician who was elected member of the Berlin House of Representatives in 2026. From 2016 to 2026, she was a borough councillor of Lichtenberg. From 2015 to 2016, she served as managing director of the Green Youth in Berlin.
