= Boroughs and quarters of Berlin =

Areas within Berlin, Germany

Boroughs and quarters of Berlin

Berlin is divided into boroughs or administrative districts (Verwaltungsbezirke). In Berlin, the term is officially shortened to Bezirke (districts). The boroughs are further divided into quarters (Ortsteile). These smaller localities are officially recognised, but have no administrative bodies of their own. Quarters and many of their subunits, the neighborhoods (Ortslagen), typically have strong identities that sometimes predate their inclusion into the modern boundaries of Berlin. Both the boroughs and the quarters function differently to other subdivisions in Germany due to Berlin's dual status as an independent city (kreisfreie Stadt) as well as a federated state of Germany (Land) in its own right.

Since 2001, Berlin has been made up of twelve boroughs, each with its own administrative body. However, because Berlin is a single municipality (Einheitsgemeinde), its boroughs have limited power, acting only as agencies of Berlin's state and city governments as laid out in the Greater Berlin Act of 1920. The boroughs are financially dependent on state donations, as they neither possess any taxation power nor own any property. This is in contrast to municipalities and counties in other German states, which are territorial corporations (Gebietskörperschaften) with autonomous functions and property.

Each borough is administered by an assembly of borough representatives (Bezirksverordnetenversammlung), directly elected by proportional representation, and a district office (Bezirksamt) led by a borough mayor (Bezirksbürgermeister), elected by the borough representatives. The district office is in charge of most administrative matters affecting its borough's residents, but its decisions can be revoked by the Berlin Senate. The borough mayors form a council of mayors (Rat der Bürgermeister), led by the city's governing mayor, and the council advises the Berlin Senate.

== History ==
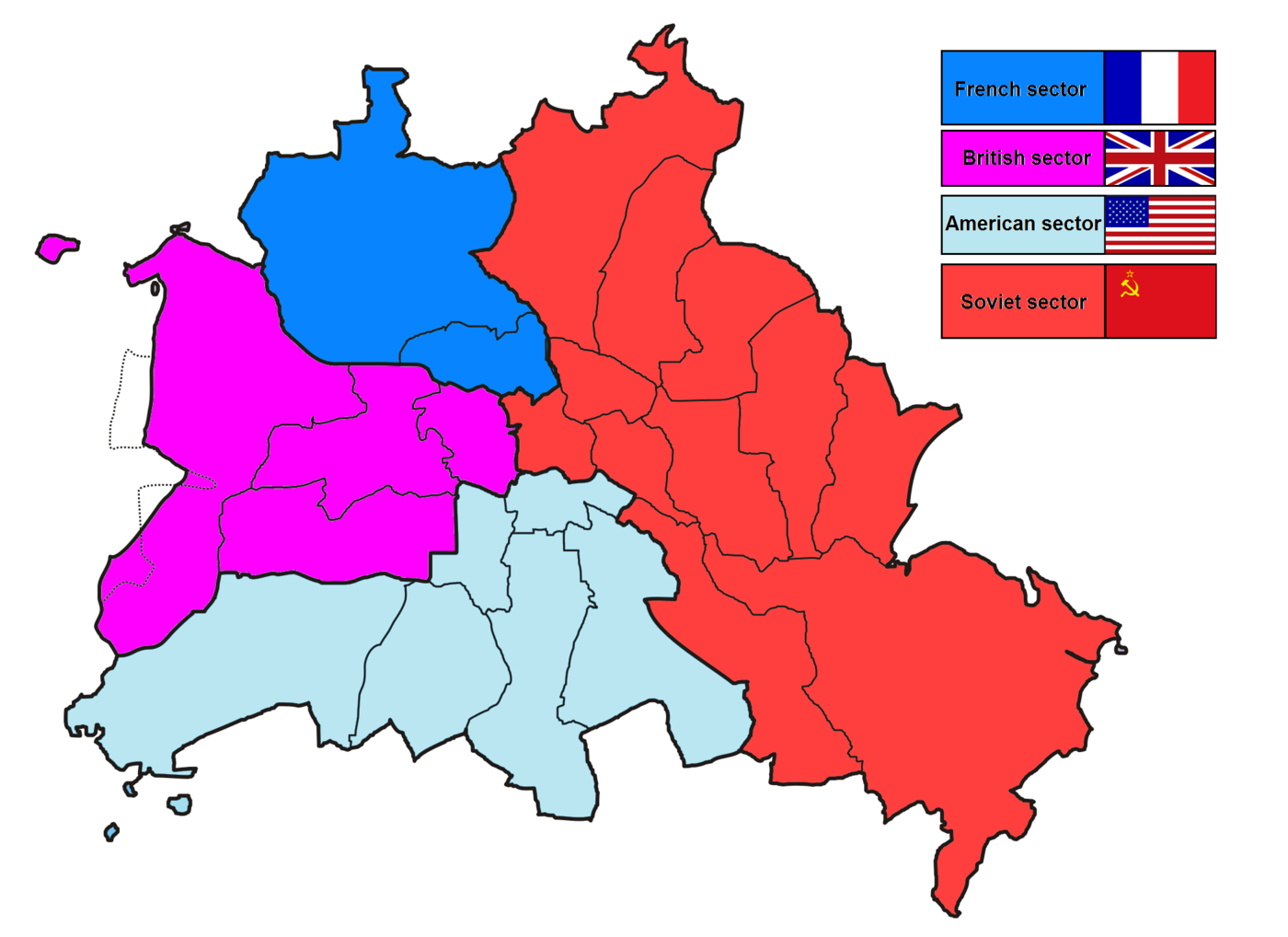
Berlin boroughs (borders as of 1987) over the four occupation sectors of Berlin (1945-1990)

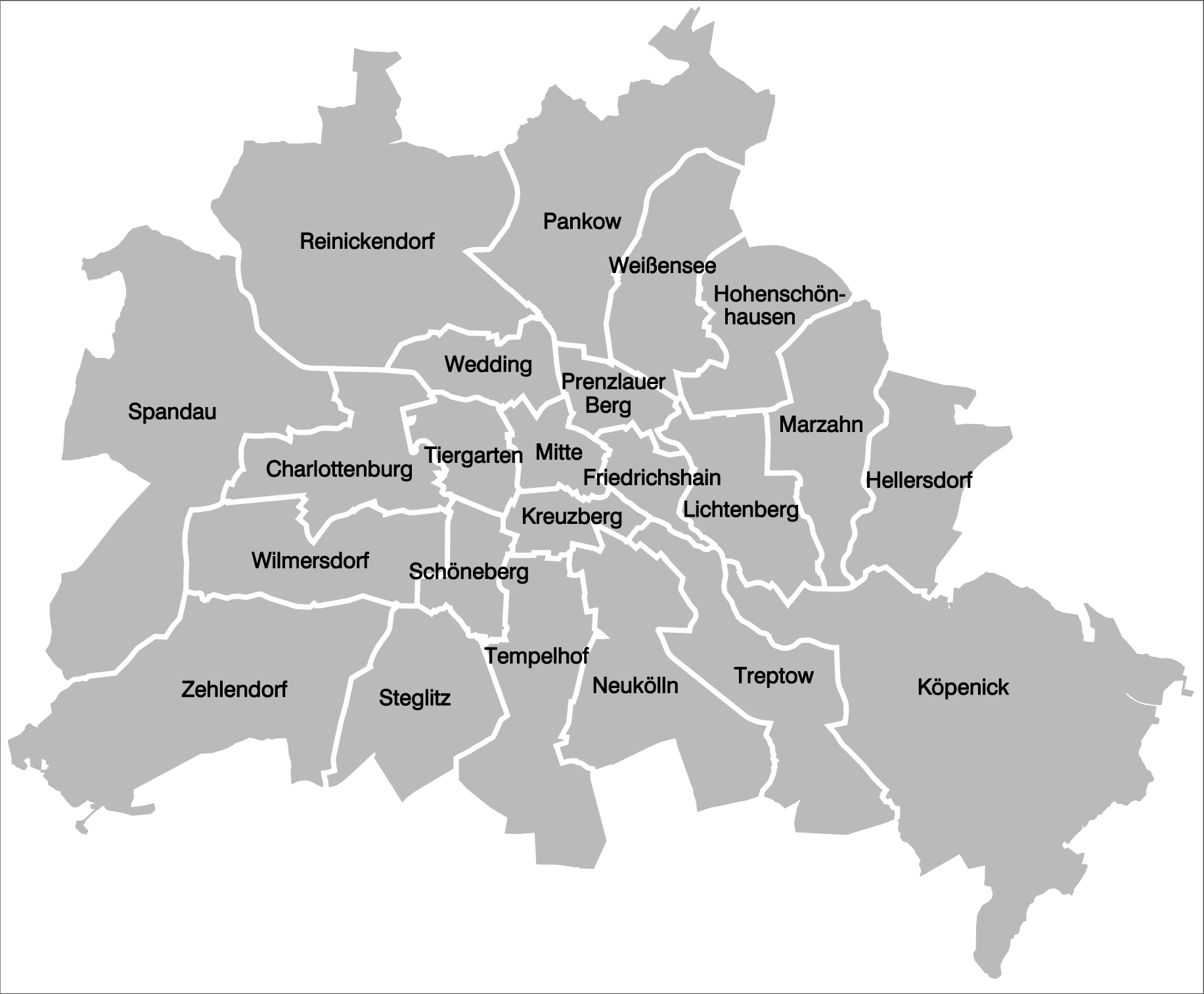
The 23 former boroughs of Berlin (1990–2000)

Residents without a migration background in Berlin on 31 December 2020 by district

Each borough is made up of several officially recognized smaller districts or quarters (Ortsteile). The number of quarters that form a borough varies considerably, ranging from two (Friedrichshain-Kreuzberg) to fifteen (Treptow-Köpenick). Most of Berlin's quarters are further composed of even smaller so-called Kieze (neighborhoods), officially called Ortslagen. The number of officially recognized neighborhoods in Berlin's quarters also varies greatly, ranging from two (Kreuzberg) to many more in older quarters, for example nine in Mitte, with many more unofficial neighborhoods and neighborships having formed over the decades. The quarters of Berlin and many of their neighborhoods typically have a historical identity as former independent cities, villages, or rural municipalities that were united in 1920 as part of the Greater Berlin Act, forming the basis for the present-day city and state. Berliners often identify more with the quarter where they live than with the borough that governs them, and in larger or older quarters, the smaller neighborhoods have often become the defining social spheres for their residents. The quarters do not have their own governmental bodies, but for urban planning and statistical purposes, the quarters are officially recognized and further subdivided into statistical zones and lebensweltlich orientierte Räume (lifeworld-oriented regions). These areas correspond roughly, but not exactly, with the official and unofficial social and historical neighborhoods recognized by residents.

When Greater Berlin was established in 1920, the city was organized into twenty boroughs, most of which were named after their largest component quarter, often a former city or municipality; others, such as Kreuzberg and Prenzlauer Berg, were named for geographic features. Minor changes to borough boundaries were made in 1938. After World War II, Berlin was divided into four sectors, with the Western sectors controlled by the United States, Britain, and France, and the Eastern sector controlled by the Soviet Union.

In 1961, the SED built the Berlin Wall to divide the city, effectively separating West Berlin from East Berlin and the rest of East Germany. Three new boroughs were created in East Berlin: Marzahn was split off from Lichtenberg in 1979, Hohenschönhausen from Weißensee in 1985, and Hellersdorf from Marzahn in 1986. In 1989, the Berlin Wall fell, and the city was reunified in 1990

After reunification, Berlin underwent a process of rapid transformation, as the city worked to rebuild and modernize its infrastructure and economy. Many new businesses and cultural institutions were established, and the city became a center of creativity and innovation.

By 2000, Berlin comprised twenty-three boroughs, as three new boroughs had been created in East Berlin. Today Berlin is divided into twelve boroughs, reduced from twenty-three boroughs by Berlin's 2001 administrative reform.

== Boroughs ==
An administrative reform in 2001 merged all but three of the existing boroughs into the current 12 boroughs, as listed below. The three boroughs that were not affected were Spandau, Reinickendorf and Neukölln, as the population of each was already exceeding 200,000.

Borough	Bundestag constituency	Population 31 December 2023	Area in km^{2}	Density per km^{2}	Map
Charlottenburg-Wilmersdorf	Berlin-Charlottenburg-Wilmersdorf (excluding Charlottenburg-Nord and the neighbourhood of Kalowswerder)	343,081	64.72	5,301	The 12 Bezirke of Berlin
Friedrichshain-Kreuzberg	Berlin-Friedrichshain-Kreuzberg – Prenzlauer Berg East	293,454	20.16	14,556	The 12 Bezirke of Berlin
Lichtenberg (Note: The borough was formerly part of East Berlin)	Berlin-Lichtenberg	311,881	52.29	5,964	The 12 Bezirke of Berlin
Marzahn-Hellersdorf (Note: The borough was formerly part of East Berlin)	Berlin-Marzahn-Hellersdorf	291,948	61.74	4,728	The 12 Bezirke of Berlin
Mitte	Berlin-Mitte	397,134	39.47	10,062	The 12 Bezirke of Berlin
Neukölln	Berlin-Neukölln	330,017	44.93	7,345	The 12 Bezirke of Berlin
Pankow (Note: The borough was formerly part of East Berlin)	Berlin-Pankow (excluding Prenzlauer Berg east of Prenzlauer Allee)	424,307	103.01	4,119	The 12 Bezirke of Berlin
Reinickendorf	Berlin-Reinickendorf	268,792	89.46	3,005	The 12 Bezirke of Berlin
Spandau	Berlin-Spandau – Charlottenburg North	257,091	91.91	2,797	The 12 Bezirke of Berlin
Steglitz-Zehlendorf	Berlin-Steglitz-Zehlendorf	310,446	102.50	3,029	The 12 Bezirke of Berlin
Tempelhof-Schöneberg	Berlin-Tempelhof-Schöneberg	355,868	53.09	6,703	The 12 Bezirke of Berlin
Treptow-Köpenick (Note: The borough was formerly part of East Berlin)	Berlin-Treptow-Köpenick	294,081	168.42	1,746	The 12 Bezirke of Berlin

=== Coats of arms ===
The mural crown of the coats of arms of Berliner Bezirke

All coats of arms of Berlin's boroughs (the current as of the ones in the period 1990 to 2001) have some common attributes: the shield has a Spanish form, and the coronet is represented by a mural crown, three towers in red bricks with the Berlin's coat of arms in the middle.

Most of the boroughs' current coats of arms have changed some elements in their fields. Some display a fusion of themes of the merged Bezirke (Charlottenburg-Wilmersdorf, Lichtenberg, Steglitz-Zehlendorf, Tempelhof-Schöneberg); others have modified their themes taken from one of the two (or more) former merged boroughs (Friedrichshain-Kreuzberg, Marzahn-Hellersdorf, Mitte and Treptow-Köpenick). Only the unchanged boroughs of Neukölln, Reinickendorf and Spandau have not changed their fields. Pankow's coat of arms was created with a new design in 2008, having been the only borough without a coat of arms for seven years.

Charlottenburg-Wilmersdorf	Friedrichshain-Kreuzberg	Lichtenberg	Marzahn-Hellersdorf	Mitte	Neukölln	Pankow	Reinickendorf	Spandau	Steglitz-Zehlendorf	Tempelhof-Schöneberg	Treptow-Köpenick

== Administration and politics ==
The borough government is part of the two-tier administration of the Berlin city-state, whereby the Senate and its affiliated agencies, institutions, and municipal enterprises form the first tier of the so-called Hauptverwaltung (central administration). In the second tier, the boroughs enjoy a certain degree of autonomy, although in no way comparable to the German Landkreise districts or independent cities, nor even to the local government of a common municipality as a legal entity, as according to the Berlin Constitution the legal status of the city as a German state itself is that of a unified municipality (Einheitsgemeinde). The power of the borough governments is limited, and their performance of assigned tasks is subject to regulatory supervision by the Senate.

Nevertheless, the twelve self-governing boroughs have constitutional status, and are themselves subdivided into two administrative bodies. Each is governed by the assembly of borough representatives (Bezirksverordnetenversammlung, BVV) and a full-time council at the borough's district office (Bezirksamt), consisting of five councilors (Bezirksstadträte) and headed by a borough mayor (Bezirksbürgermeister). The BVV is directly elected by the borough's population and therefore acts as a borough parliament, though it is officially part of the executive. It elects the members of the borough council, checks its daily administration, and is able to make applications and recommendations. The twelve borough mayors regularly meet in the Council of Mayors (Rat der Bürgermeister), led by the city's Governing Mayor; the council answers to and advises the Senate.

The boroughs' quarters have no local government bodies, and the administrative duties of their former representatives, the Ortsvorsteher, were taken over by the borough mayors.

=== State election party votes by constituency ===
People who live in the former West Berlin tend to vote for the CDU and the SPD, While voters in the former East Berlin tend to vote for Linke and the AfD.

Votes for parties by state election year ( Abgeordnetenhaus of Berlin)
1990 Berlin state election

1995 Berlin state election

1999 Berlin state election

2001 Berlin state election

2006 Berlin state election

2011 Berlin state election

2016 Berlin state election

2021 Berlin state election (invalidated)

2023 Berlin state election (repeat)
Party overview: CDU (gray), PDS or The Left (purple), SPD (red), AfD (blue), The Greens (green), FDP (yellow)

== Quarters ==
As of 2012, the twelve boroughs are made up of a total of 97 officially recognized quarters (Ortsteile). Most of these smaller localities are further subdivided into officially recognized neighborhoods (Ortslagen), but often amalgamated or extended by the populace with other unofficial zones and areas, in German usually called Kieze, Stadtteile, Stadtviertel or Orte. The largest quarter (Ortsteil) is Köpenick (34.9 km^{2} or 13.5 sq mi), the smallest one is Hansaviertel (53 ha or 130 acres). The most populated quarter is Prenzlauer Berg (168,947 inhabitants in 2024), the least populated is Malchow (450 inhabitants in 2008).

Note that the coats of arms shown for quarters in the tables below are historical and no longer in official use, having lost their validity upon incorporation into Greater Berlin or new boroughs.

(01) Mitte

Locality	Area in km^{2}	Population as of 2008	Density inhabitants per km^{2}	Map
(0101) Mitte	10.70	79,582	7,445	
(0102) Moabit	7.72	69,425	8,993	
(0103) Hansaviertel	0.53	5,889	11,111	
(0104) Tiergarten	5.17	12,486	2,415	
(0105) Wedding	9.23	76,363	8,273	
(0106) Gesundbrunnen	6.13	82,729	13,496	

(02) Friedrichshain-Kreuzberg

Locality	Area in km^{2}	Population as of 2008	Density inhabitants per km^{2}	Map
(0201) Friedrichshain	9.78	114,050	11,662	
(0202) Kreuzberg	10.40	147,227	14,184	

(03) Pankow

Locality	Area in km^{2}	Population as of 2008	Density inhabitants per km^{2}	Map
(0301) Prenzlauer Berg	11.00	142,319	12,991	
(0302) Weißensee	7.93	45,485	5,736	
(0303) Blankenburg	6.03	6,550	1,086	
(0304) Heinersdorf	3.95	6,580	1,666	
(0305) Karow	6.65	18,258	2,746	
(0306) Stadtrandsiedlung Malchow	5.68	1,166	205	
(0307) Pankow	5.66	55,854	9,868	
(0308) Blankenfelde	13.40	1,917	144	
(0309) Buch	18.20	13,188	727	
(0310) Französisch Buchholz	12.00	18,766	1,560	
(0311) Niederschönhausen	6.49	26,903	4,145	
(0312) Rosenthal	4.90	8,933	1,823	
(0313) Wilhelmsruh	1.37	7,216	5,267	

(04) Charlottenburg-Wilmersdorf

Locality	Area in km^{2}	Population as of 2008	Density inhabitants per km^{2}	Map
(0401) Charlottenburg	10.60	118,704	11,198	
(0402) Wilmersdorf	7.16	92,815	12,963	
(0403) Schmargendorf	3.59	19,750	5,501	
(0404) Grunewald	22.30	10,014	448	
(0405) Westend	13.50	37,883	2,800	
(0406) Charlottenburg-Nord	6.20	17,327	2,795	
(0407) Halensee	1.27	13,966	10,997	

(05) Spandau

Locality	Area in km^{2}	Population as of 2008	Density inhabitants per km^{2}	Map
(0501) Spandau	8.03	33,433	4,164	District map of Spandau
(0502) Haselhorst	4.73	13,668	2,891	District map of Spandau
(0503) Siemensstadt	5.66	11,388	2,012	District map of Spandau
(0504) Staaken	10.90	41,470	3,810	District map of Spandau
(0505) Gatow	10.10	3,908	386	District map of Spandau
(0506) Kladow	14.80	13,628	922	District map of Spandau
(0507) Hakenfelde	20.40	26,337	1,292	District map of Spandau
(0508) Falkenhagener Feld	6.88	34,778	5,056	District map of Spandau
(0509) Wilhelmstadt	10.40	37,080	3,558	District map of Spandau

(06) Steglitz-Zehlendorf

Locality	Area in km^{2}	Population as of 2008	Density inhabitants per km^{2}	Map
(0601) Steglitz	6.79	70,555	10,391	
(0602) Lichterfelde	18.20	78,338	4,300	
(0603) Lankwitz	6.99	40,385	5,778	
(0604) Zehlendorf	18.80	57,902	3,075	
(0605) Dahlem	8.36	14,966	1,784	
(0606) Nikolassee	19.61	15,899	811	
(0607) Wannsee	23.68	9,044	382	
(0608) Schlachtensee	4.05	10,573	2,611	

(07) Tempelhof-Schöneberg

Locality	Area in km^{2}	Population as of 2008	Density inhabitants per km^{2}	Map
(0701) Schöneberg	10.60	116,743	11,003	District map of Tempelhof-Schöneberg
(0702) Friedenau	1.65	26,736	16,204	District map of Tempelhof-Schöneberg
(0703) Tempelhof	12.20	54,382	4,458	District map of Tempelhof-Schöneberg
(0704) Mariendorf	9.38	48,882	5,211	District map of Tempelhof-Schöneberg
(0705) Marienfelde	9.15	30,151	3,295	District map of Tempelhof-Schöneberg
(0706) Lichtenrade	10.10	49,451	4,896	District map of Tempelhof-Schöneberg

(08) Neukölln

Locality	Area in km^{2}	Population as of 2008	Density inhabitants per km^{2}	Map
(0801) Neukölln	11.70	154,127	13,173	District map of Neukölln
(0802) Britz	12.40	38,334	3,091	District map of Neukölln
(0803) Buckow	6.35	38,018	5,987	District map of Neukölln
(0804) Rudow	11.80	41,040	3,478	District map of Neukölln
(0805) Gropiusstadt	2.66	35,844	13,475	District map of Neukölln

(09) Treptow-Köpenick

Locality	Area in km^{2}	Population as of 2008	Density inhabitants per km^{2}	Map
(0901) Alt-Treptow	2.31	10,426	4,513	District map of Treptow-Köpenick
(0902) Plänterwald	3.01	10,618	3,528	District map of Treptow-Köpenick
(0903) Baumschulenweg	4.82	16,780	3,481	District map of Treptow-Köpenick
(0904) Johannisthal	6.54	17,650	2,699	District map of Treptow-Köpenick
(0905) Niederschöneweide	3.49	10,043	2,878	District map of Treptow-Köpenick
(0906) Altglienicke	7.89	26,101	3,308	District map of Treptow-Köpenick
(0907) Adlershof	6.11	15,112	2,473	District map of Treptow-Köpenick
(0908) Bohnsdorf	6.52	10,751	1,649	District map of Treptow-Köpenick
(0909) Oberschöneweide	6.18	17,094	2,766	District map of Treptow-Köpenick
(0910) Köpenick	34.90	59,201	1,695	District map of Treptow-Köpenick
(0911) Friedrichshagen	14.00	17,285	1,233	District map of Treptow-Köpenick
(0912) Rahnsdorf	21.50	8,891	414	District map of Treptow-Köpenick
(0913) Grünau	9.13	5,482	600	District map of Treptow-Köpenick
(0914) Müggelheim	22.20	6,350	286	District map of Treptow-Köpenick
(0915) Schmöckwitz	17.10	4,117	240	District map of Treptow-Köpenick

(10) Marzahn-Hellersdorf

Locality	Area in km^{2}	Population as of 2008	Density inhabitants per km^{2}	Map
(1001) Marzahn	19.50	102,398	5,240	District map of Marzahn-Hellersdorf
(1002) Biesdorf	12.40	24,543	1,973	District map of Marzahn-Hellersdorf
(1003) Kaulsdorf	8.81	18,732	2,126	District map of Marzahn-Hellersdorf
(1004) Mahlsdorf	12.90	26,852	2,075	District map of Marzahn-Hellersdorf
(1005) Hellersdorf	8.10	72,602	8,963	District map of Marzahn-Hellersdorf

(11) Lichtenberg

Locality	Area in km^{2}	Population as of 2008	Density inhabitants per km^{2}	Map
(1101) Friedrichsfelde	5.55	50,010	9,011	District map of Lichtenberg
(1102) Karlshorst	6.60	21,329	3,232	District map of Lichtenberg
(1103) Lichtenberg	7.22	32,295	4,473	District map of Lichtenberg
(1104) Falkenberg	3.06	1,164	380	District map of Lichtenberg
(1106) Malchow	1.54	450	292	District map of Lichtenberg
(1107) Wartenberg	6.92	2,433	352	District map of Lichtenberg
(1109) Neu-Hohenschönhausen	5.16	53,698	10,407	District map of Lichtenberg
(1110) Alt-Hohenschönhausen	9.33	41,780	4,478	District map of Lichtenberg
(1111) Fennpfuhl	2.12	30,932	14,591	District map of Lichtenberg
(1112) Rummelsburg	4.52	17,567	3,887	District map of Lichtenberg

- Codes 1105 and 1108 (this one to former Hohenschönhausen locality) are not assigned

(12) Reinickendorf

Locality	Area in km^{2}	Population as of 2008	Density inhabitants per km^{2}	Map
(1201) Reinickendorf	10.50	72,859	6,939	District map of Reinickendorf
(1202) Tegel	33.70	33,417	992	District map of Reinickendorf
(1203) Konradshöhe	2.20	5,997	2,726	District map of Reinickendorf
(1204) Heiligensee	10.70	17,641	1,649	District map of Reinickendorf
(1205) Frohnau	7.80	17,025	2,183	District map of Reinickendorf
(1206) Hermsdorf	6.10	16,503	2,705	District map of Reinickendorf
(1207) Waidmannslust	2.30	10,022	4,357	District map of Reinickendorf
(1208) Lübars	5.00	4,915	983	District map of Reinickendorf
(1209) Wittenau	5.87	22,696	3,866	District map of Reinickendorf
(1210) Märkisches Viertel	3.20	35,206	11,002	District map of Reinickendorf
(1211) Borsigwalde	2.03	6,432	3,168	District map of Reinickendorf

== See also ==
- Politics of Berlin
- Berlin Police
