= Karsten Woldeit =

German politician (born 1975)

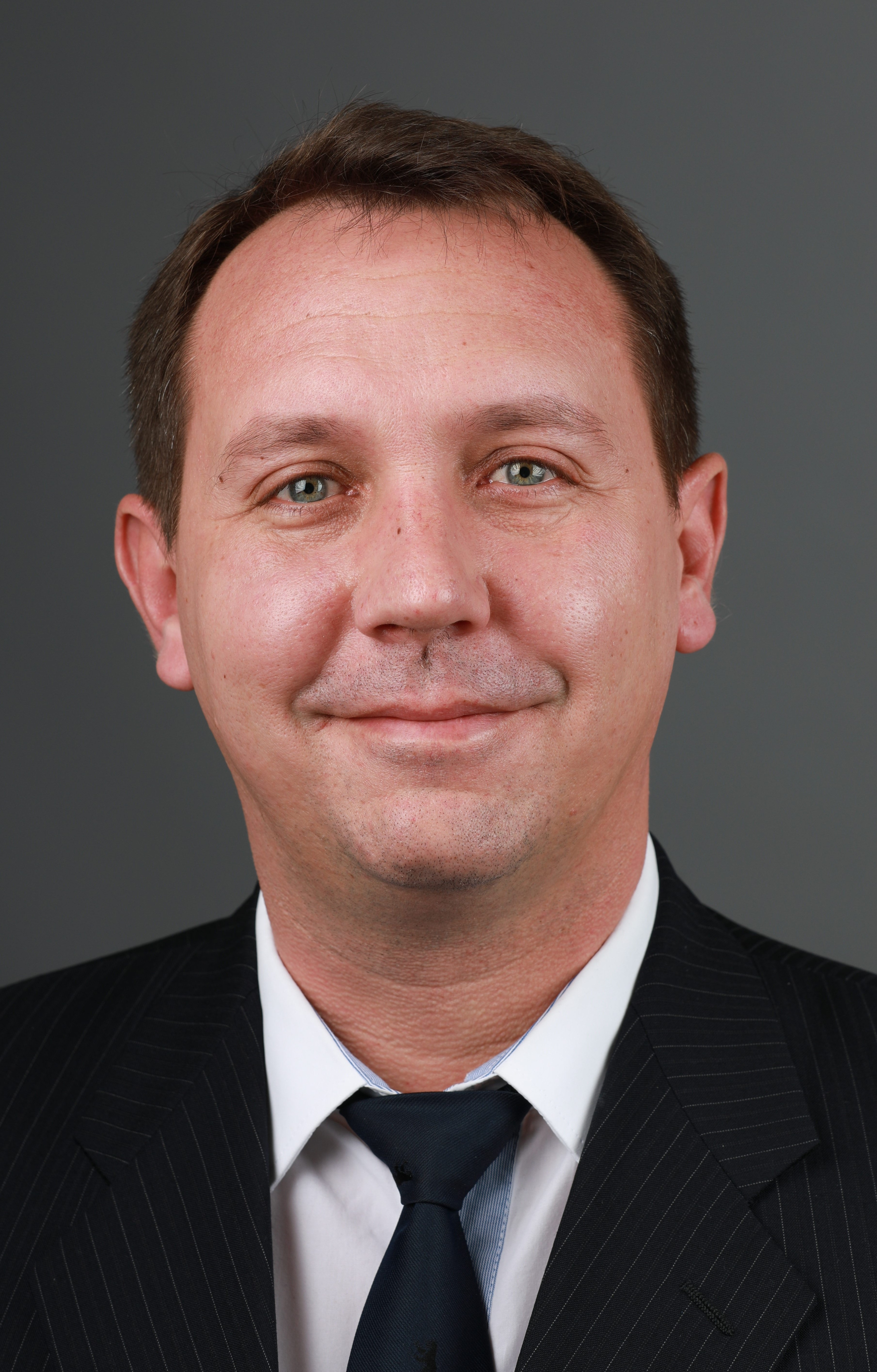
- Woldeit in 2017

Member of the Abgeordnetenhaus of Berlin
- Incumbent
- Assumed office 27 October 2016

Personal details
- Born: 1975 (age 50–51) Iserlohn
- Party: Alternative for Germany (since 2014)

Karsten Ludwig Woldeit (born 1975 in Iserlohn) is a German politician serving as a member of the Abgeordnetenhaus of Berlin since 2016. From 2020 to 2022, he served as chairman of the Alternative for Germany in Lichtenberg.
