= Hohenschönhausen =

- Borough of Berlin
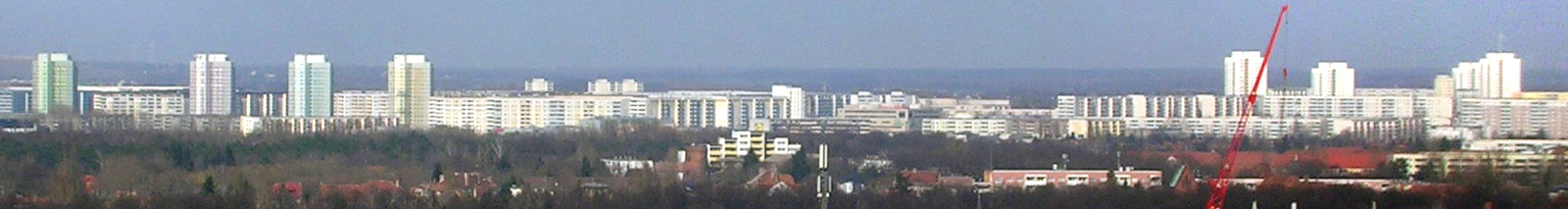

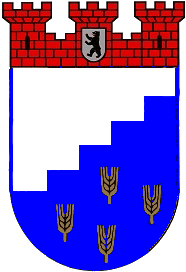
- Coat of arms

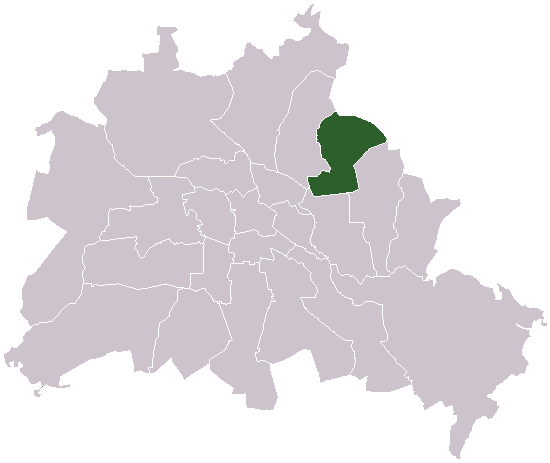
- The location of Hohenschönhausen in Berlin
- Interactive map of Hohenschönhausen
- Location within Germany Location within Berlin
- Coordinates: 52°33′N 13°30′E
- Country: Germany
- State: Berlin
- City: Berlin
- Founded: 1920
- Disbanded: 2001

Area
  - Total: 26 km^{2} (10 sq mi)

Population (2000)
  - Total: 107,113
  - Density: 4,100/km^{2} (11,000/sq mi)
- Time zone: UTC+01:00 (CET)
  - Summer (DST): UTC+02:00 (CEST)

Hohenschönhausen (German: [ˌhoːənʃøːnˈhaʊzn̩]) was a borough of Berlin, that existed from 1985 until Berlin's 2001 administrative reform. It comprised the present-day localities of Alt-Hohenschönhausen (the core of the borough), Neu-Hohenschönhausen, Malchow, Wartenberg and Falkenberg.

== Overview ==
It was created in 1985 by splitting the localities of Hohenschönhausen, Wartenberg, Falkenberg and the eastern part of Malchow off the 1920 Weißensee borough. In 2001 it was absorbed by the borough of Lichtenberg. The locality of Hohenschönhausen was then renamed Alt-Hohenschönhausen while the housing estates of Wartenberg, Falkenberg and Malchow formed the Neu-Hohenschönhausen locality.

== Culture ==
Alt-Hohenschönhausen is home to the Hohenschönhausen Memorial Center on the site of a former Stasi prison. It is also the location of the large sports complex Sportforum Hohenschönhausen.

Hohenschönhausen Castle is located in Alt-Hohenschönhausen. The Association Hohenschönhausen Castle cares for the restoration and cultural revitalization of this manor house and regularly organizes different events in the castle, such as exhibitions, readings, and concerts.

== See also ==
- Alt-Hohenschönhausen
- Berlin–Hohenschönhausen tram
- Neu-Hohenschönhausen
- SG Dynamo Hohenschönhausen
