= KaMubukwana =

Coordinates: 25°53′12″S 32°34′21″E

- Bairro
- Interactive map of KaMubukwana
- Country: Mozambique
- Time zone: UTC+2 (CAT)

KaMubukwana is a bairro in Maputo, Mozambique.
