= Lichtenberg, Berlin =

Lichtenberg
- Borough of Berlin
- Flag Coat of arms

- Location of Lichtenberg in Berlin
- Interactive map of Lichtenberg
- Location within Germany Location within Berlin
- Coordinates: 52°32′N 13°30′E
- Country: Germany
- State: Berlin
- City: Berlin
- Subdivisions: 10 localities

Government
  - Mayor: Michael Grunst (Left)

Area
  - Total: 52.30 km^{2} (20.19 sq mi)

Population (2024-12-31)
  - Total: 302,726
  - Density: 5,788/km^{2} (14,990/sq mi)
- Time zone: UTC+01:00 (CET)
  - Summer (DST): UTC+02:00 (CEST)
- Vehicle registration: B
- Website: Official homepage

Lichtenberg (German: [ˈlɪçtn̩bɛʁk]) is the eleventh borough of Berlin, Germany. In Berlin's 2001 administrative reform it absorbed the former borough of Hohenschönhausen.

The borough was formerly part of East Berlin.

== Overview ==
The district contains the Tierpark Berlin in Friedrichsfelde, the larger of Berlin's two zoological gardens. During the period of Berlin's partition between West and East, Lichtenberg was the location of the headquarters of the Stasi, the East German state security service. Prior to the establishment of the GDR it housed the main office of the Soviet Military Administration in Berlin, and before that it was an officers' mess of the Wehrmacht. The complex is now the location of the Stasi Museum. The Berlin-Hohenschönhausen Memorial is on the site of the main remand prison of the Stasi. Additionally, Lichtenberg is the location of the German-Russian Museum, the historical venue where the German armed forces (Wehrmacht) unconditionally surrendered on 8 May 1945.

The population is ethnically diverse, and has a significant Vietnamese community.

== Subdivision ==
Subdivisions of Lichtenberg

Lichtenberg is divided into 10 localities:

Locality	Area (km^{2})	Inhabitants; 30 June 2008	Density (inhabitants/km^{2})
1101 Friedrichsfelde	5.8	50,010	8,622
1102 Karlshorst	6.6	21,057	3,190
1103 Lichtenberg	7.33	32,295	4,406
1104 Falkenberg	3.0	1,164	388
1106 Malchow	3.0	450	150
1107 Wartenberg	5.31	2,433	458
1109 Neu-Hohenschönhausen	5.32	53,698	10,094
1110 Alt-Hohenschönhausen	10.0	41,780	4,178
1111 Fennpfuhl	1.75	30,932	17,675
1112 Rummelsburg	4.16	17,567	4,223

== History ==
The historic village of Lichtenberg together with neighbouring Friedrichsfelde, Karlshorst, Marzahn, Biesdorf, Hellersdorf, Kaulsdorf and Mahlsdorf was incorporated as the 17th borough of Berlin by the 1920 Greater Berlin Act.

In the 1970s, the East German government had large pre-fabricated high-rise housing estates (Plattenbau) built in the east of the Lichtenberg borough. This area was separated off and became the new borough of Marzahn, which included Biesdorf, Hellersdorf, Kaulsdorf and Mahlsdorf in 1979. In 1986, this district in turn was split into the two boroughs of Marzahn and Hellersdorf in 1986, and again merged as Marzahn-Hellersdorf by the 2001 administrative reform.

== Politics ==
=== District council ===
The governing body of Lichtenberg is the district council (Bezirksverordnetenversammlung). It has responsibility for passing laws and electing the city government, including the mayor. The most recent district council election was held on 26 September 2021, and the results were as follows:

Party	Lead candidate	Votes	%	+/-	Seats	+/-
The Left (LINKE)	Michael Grunst	36,283	24.8	▼5.0	15	▼3
Social Democratic Party (SPD)	Jutta Feige	28,739	19.6	▼2.0	12	▼1
Christian Democratic Union (CDU)	Martin Schaefer	19,224	13.1	▲0.5	8	▲1
Alliance 90/The Greens (Grüne)	Daniela Ehlers	19,057	13.0	▲4.8	8	▲3
Alternative for Germany (AfD)	Karsten Woldeit	17,528	12.0	▼7.2	7	▼5
Free Democratic Party (FDP)	Rico Apitz	8,009	5.5	▲2.5	3	▲3
Tierschutzpartei	Katja Michel	6,528	4.5	New	2	New
Die PARTEI		3,744	2.6	New	0	New
Free Voters		3,214	2.2	New	0	New
dieBasis		2,179	1.5	New	0	New
Pirate Party Germany		1,124	0.8	▼2.1	0	±0
National Democratic Party		433	0.3	▼0.7	0	±0
Liberal Conservative Reformers		214	0.1	New	0	New
Valid votes		146,276	98.8			
Invalid votes		1,767	1.2			
Total		148,043	100.0		55	±0
Electorate/voter turnout		216,202	68.5	▲8.4		
Source: Elections Berlin

=== District government ===
The district mayor (Bezirksbürgermeister) is elected by the Bezirksverordnetenversammlung, and positions in the district government (Bezirksamt) are apportioned based on party strength. Michael Grunst of the Left was elected mayor on 16 December 2016. Since the 2021 municipal elections, the composition of the district government is as follows:

Councillor	Party	Portfolio
Michael Grunst	LINKE	District Mayor; Staff, Finance, Economy and Culture
Kevin Hönicke	SPD	Deputy Mayor; Urban Development, Civil Service and Labour
Martin Schaefer	CDU	Public Order, Environment and Traffic
Filiz Keküllüoğlu	GRÜNE	Education, Sport and Logistics
Camilla Schuler	LINKE	Family, Youth and Health
Vacant	AfD	Social Affairs
Source: Berlin.de

== Twin towns – sister cities ==
Lichtenberg is twinned with:

- Białołęka (Warsaw), Poland (2000)
- Hajnówka County, Poland (2001)
- Hoàn Kiếm (Hanoi), Vietnam (2015)
- Jurbarkas, Lithuania (2003)
- Kaliningrad Oblast, Russia (2001)
- KaMubukwana (Maputo), Mozambique (1995)
- Margareten (Vienna), Austria (2015)

== People ==
- Ilse Stöbe (1911–1942), German journalist and resistance fighter
- Hans Kempin (1913–1992), German Waffen-SS combat and training officer
- Bommi Baumann (born 1947), German construction worker, co-founder of the German organization Movement 2 June and author
- Gregor Gysi (born 1948), German politician (SED, The Linke)
- Katja Lange-Müller (born 1951), German writer
- Gesine Lötzsch (born 1961), German politician (SED, The Linke)
- Annett Fleischer (born 1979), German actress
- Alexander Fehling (born 1981), German actor
- Christoph Sydow (1985–2020), German journalist
- Daniel Siebert (born 1984), German football referee
- Patrick Hausding (born 1989), German diver

== See also ==
- Berlin-Lichtenberg (electoral district)
