= Wartenberg station =

Railway station in Lichtenberg, Germany

Coordinates: 52.5730°N 13.5038°E

Wartenberg
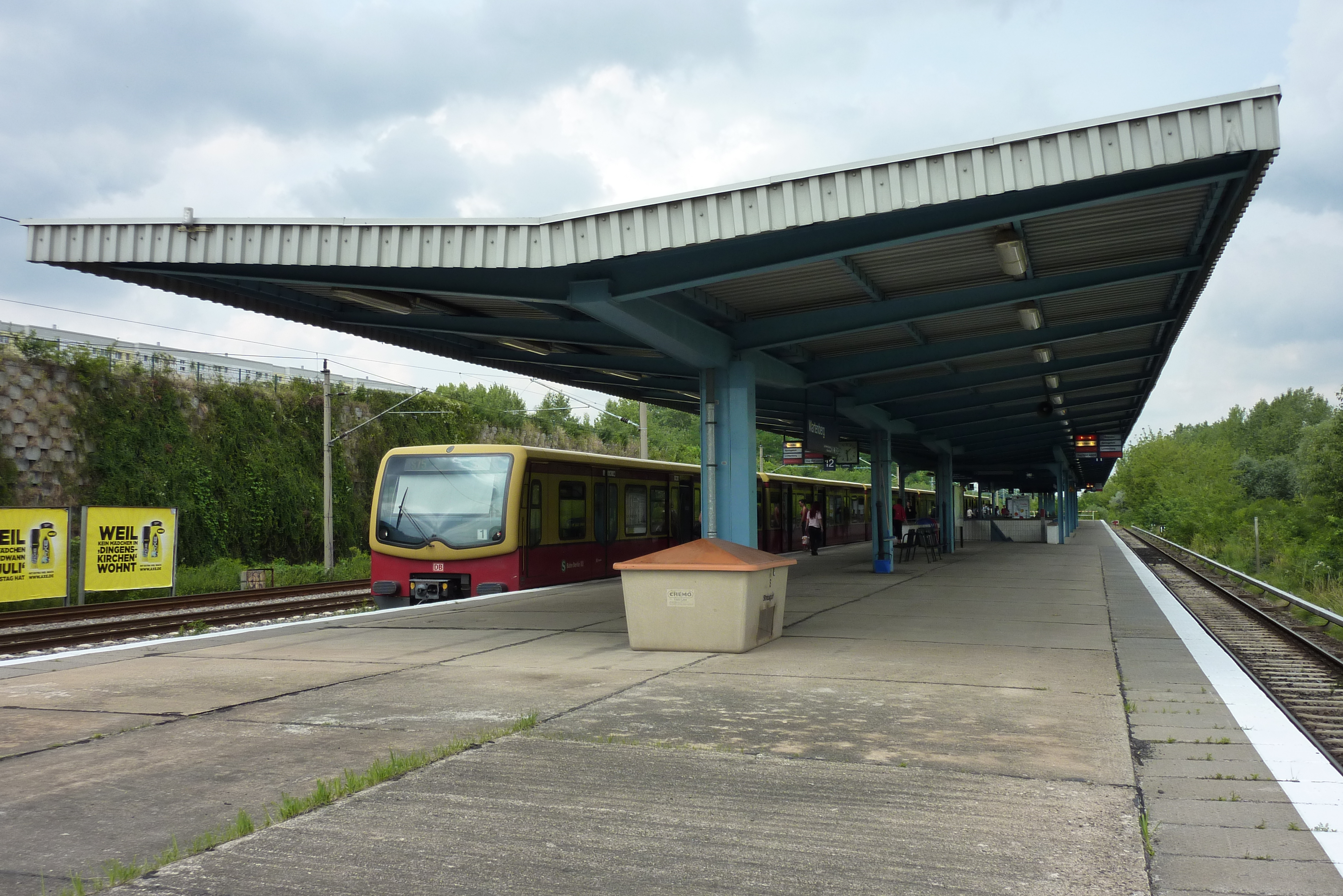

General information
- Owner: DB Netz
- Operator: DB Station&Service
- Platforms: 1 island platform
- Tracks: 2
- Train operators: S-Bahn Berlin
- Connections: 256

Other information
- Station code: 6551
- DS100 code: BWAB
- IBNR: 8089093
- Category: 5
- Fare zone: VBB: Berlin B/5656
- Website: www.bahnhof.de

History
- Opened: 20 December 1985; 40 years ago

Services
Preceding station	Berlin S-Bahn	Following station
Hohenschönhausen towards Warschauer Straße	S75	Terminus
Location

Berlin-Wartenberg is a railway station in the Lichtenberg district of Berlin. It is served by the S-Bahn line S75.
