= Greater Berlin Act =

German municipal law

Coordinates: 52.517°N 13.408°E

The Greater Berlin Act (German: Groß-Berlin-Gesetz), officially Law Regarding the Creation of the New Municipality of Berlin (German: Gesetz über die Bildung einer neuen Stadtgemeinde Berlin), was a law passed by the Prussian state government in 1920, which greatly expanded the size of the Prussian and German capital of Berlin.

== History ==
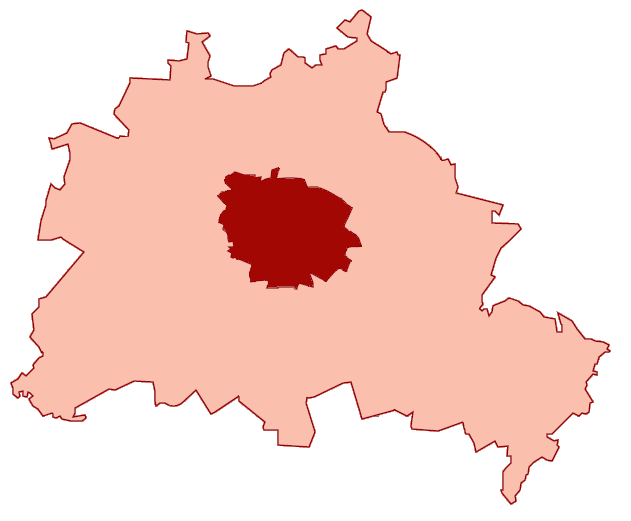
Pre-1920 municipal limits of the City of Berlin (dark red) within the extended city area of Greater Berlin (light red)

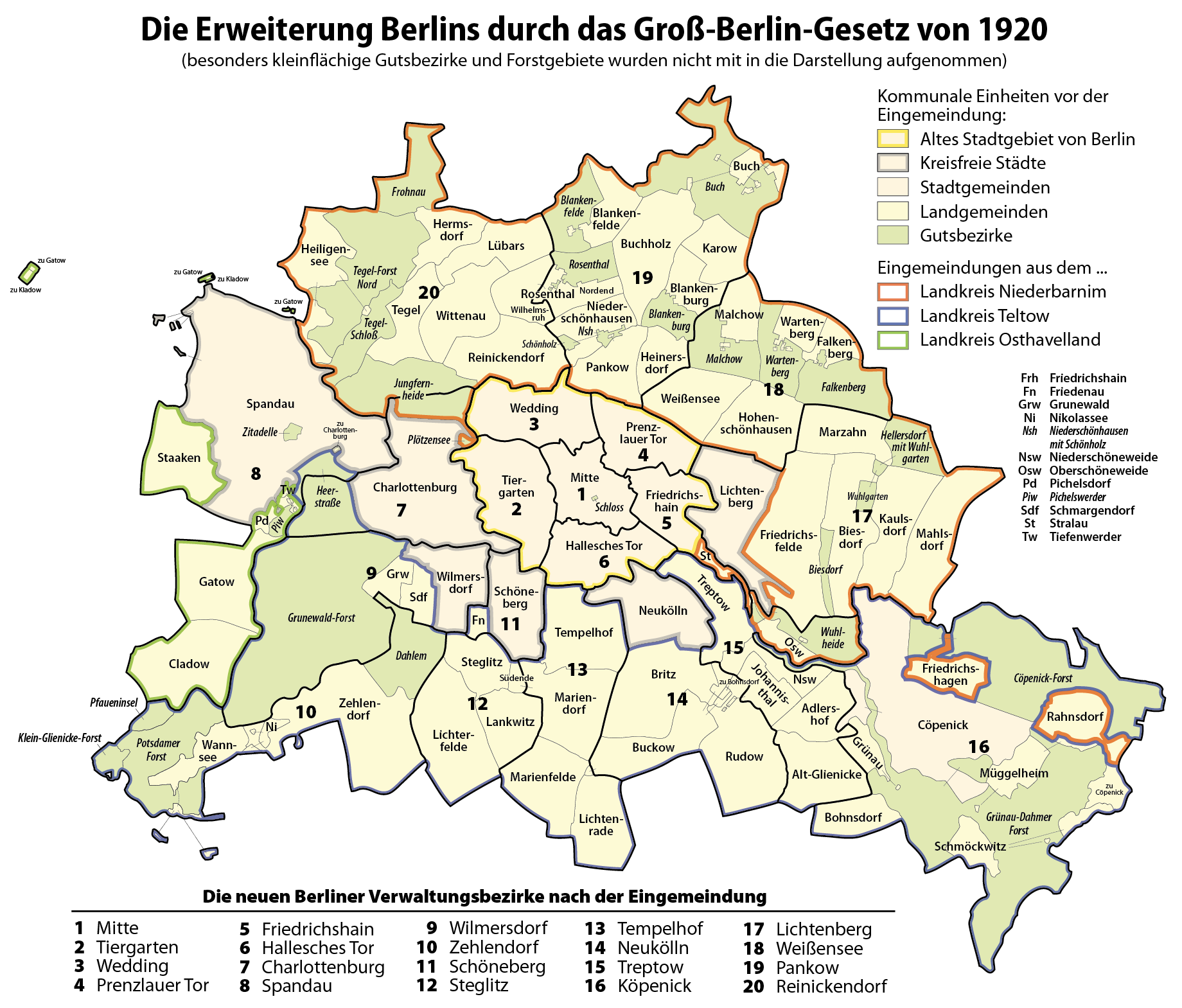
Map showing the new territories merged into Berlin in 1920

Berlin had been part of the Province of Brandenburg since 1815. On 1 April 1881, the city became Stadtkreis Berlin, a city district separate from Brandenburg. The Greater Berlin Act was passed by the Prussian Parliament on 27 April 1920 and came into effect on 1 October of the same year. The new Prussian province then termed Greater Berlin acquired territories from the Province of Brandenburg and consisted of the following:

- the city of Berlin (Alt-Berlin);
- seven towns that surrounded Berlin, namely Charlottenburg, Köpenick, Lichtenberg, Neukölln/Rixdorf, Schöneberg, Spandau and Wilmersdorf;
- 59 rural communities and 27 estate districts from the surrounding districts of Niederbarnim, Osthavelland and Teltow;
- the grounds of the Berliner Stadtschloss, which had formed an estate district in its own right.

The Act increased the area of Berlin thirteen times from 6,572 hectares to 87,810 hectares. The population also rose to 4 million, making it the largest city in Germany.

Greater Berlin was then subdivided into 20 boroughs (Verwaltungsbezirke):

- from Alt-Berlin: Mitte, Tiergarten, Wedding, Prenzlauer Berg, Kreuzberg and Friedrichshain;
- one borough for each of the seven previously independent towns: Charlottenburg, Köpenick, Lichtenberg, Neukölln, Schöneberg, Spandau and Wilmersdorf;
- seven new boroughs created from the remaining added areas, each named after the largest village in the area at the time: Pankow, Reinickendorf, Steglitz, Tempelhof, Treptow, Weißensee and Zehlendorf.

Through that law, it became possible to implement integrated town planning across the whole of Greater Berlin. The Act was an important foundation for the rise of Berlin to a cultural centre of Europe in the 1920s.

Apart from minor changes, the city boundary defined in the law is still the same as today even though its character has changed several times over the years. Originally a mere municipal boundary, it became a demarcation line between occupation zones after 1945 and part of the Iron Curtain after 1949, with the Berlin Wall on some of its length between 1961 and 1990. Since the Reunification of Germany, it is the border between the German states of Berlin and Brandenburg.

== See also ==
- Greater Hamburg Act
