= S75 (Berlin) =

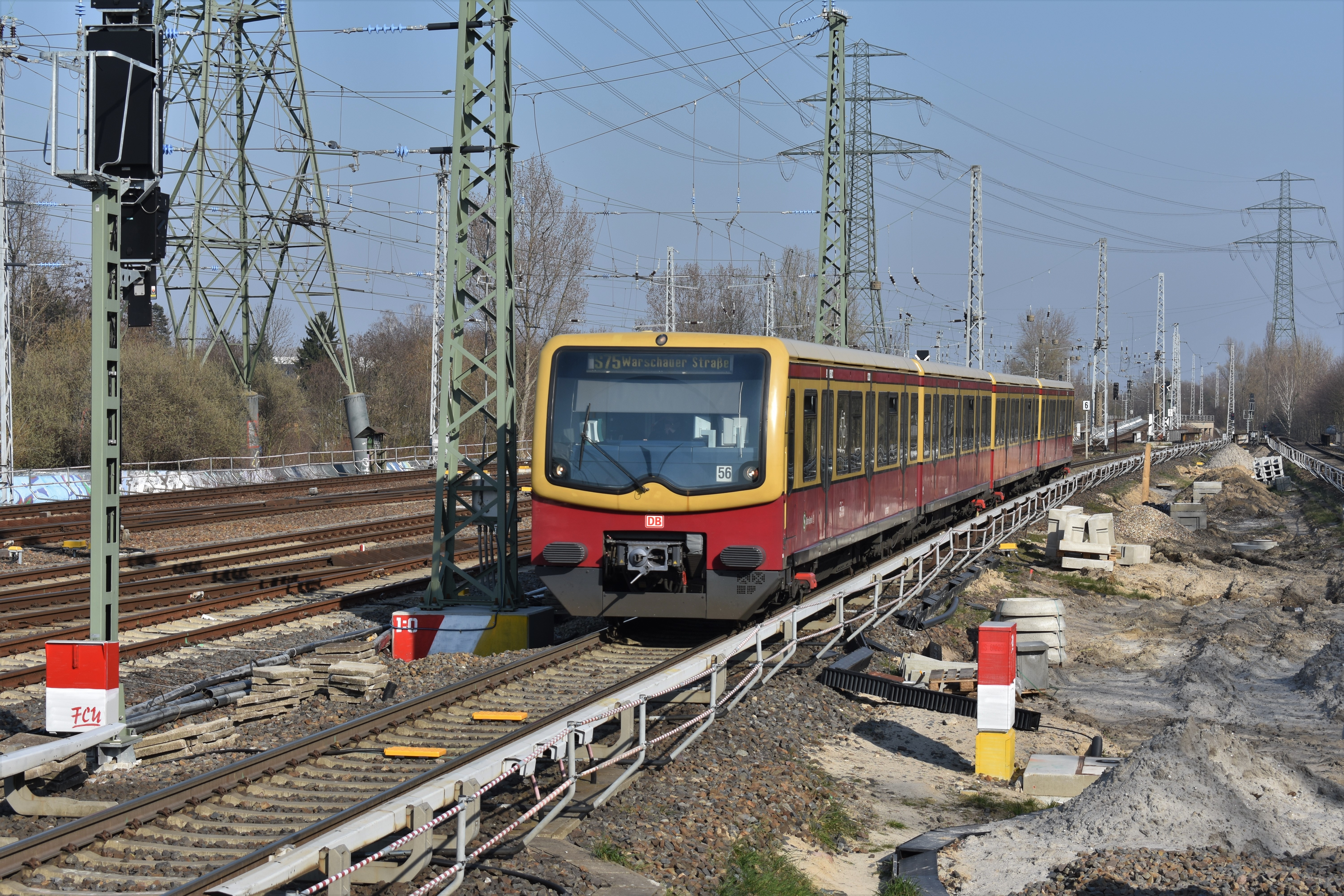

Overview
- Locale: Berlin

Service
- System: Berlin S-Bahn
- Operator(s): S-Bahn Berlin GmbH
- Rolling stock: DBAG Class 481

Technical
- Electrification: 750 V DC Third rail

S75 is a line on the Berlin S-Bahn. It operates from Wartenberg to Warschauer Straße over:

- a section of the Outer ring, completed in the early 1940s as part of the Outer freight ring,
- the Prussian Eastern line, opened on 1 October 1866 and electrified on 6 November 1928,

== Service history ==
The S75 was created on 2 June 1991, replacing the Lilac route of the East Berlin S-Bahn between Alexanderplatz and Wartenberg.
