= December 12 =

December 12 this year in various calendars
- Saturday, 12 December 2026
Akan	Monomemene
Armenian	25 Kʿaloch 1476
Aztec	Tozoztontli 11, 12 Cuetzpalin
Babylonian	2 Kislimu, 2337 SE
Balinese pawukon	Menga, Kajeng, Laba, Pon, Maulu, Saniscara of Gumbreg, Indra, Gigis, Manusa
Bengali	27 Ogrohayon, BS 1433
Chinese	Yang Metal Monkey・Root Mansion; Fire Horse Year, Month 11, Day 4 (Daxue, 10 days until Dongzhi)
Common Era	12 December 2026 CE
Coptic	3 Koiak, AM 1743
Egyptian	30 Pharmuthi, 2775 NE
Ethiopian	3 Tākḫśāś, 2019 Amätä Məhrät
French Republican	Décade III, Primidi de Frimaire de l'Année 235 de la République
Gregorian	12 December, AD 2026
Hebrew	2 Tevet, AM 5787
Hindu	Uttarāṣāḍha・Vṛddhi; Solar: 26 Mārgaśīrṣa, 1948 SE; Lunisolar: Tr̥tīyā, Śukla pakṣa of Mārgaśīrṣa, 2083 VE; Rāudra・5127 KY・1,872,921
Icelandic	Laugardagur, 20 Ýlir 2026
Islamic	2 Rajab, AH 1448 (using tabular method)
ISO week date	2026-W50-6
Japanese	4 Shimotsuki, Reiwa 8 (Taisetsu, 10 days until Tōji)
Julian	29 November, AD 2026 (AM 7535)
Julian day	2461387
Korean	4 Jwidal, 4359 DE
Maya	13.0.14.3.4; 17 Mac, 12 Kan
Roman	ante diem III Kalendas Decembres, MMDCCLXXIX AUC
Solar Hijri	21 Azar, SH 1405
Tibetan	3 lhag mgo, me pho rta 2153 or 1772 or 1000

<<	December					>>
Su	Mo	Tu	We	Th	Fr	Sa
		1	2	3	4	5
6	7	8	9	10	11	12
13	14	15	16	17	18	19
20	21	22	23	24	25	26
27	28	29	30	31
2026

December 12 in recent years
2025 (Friday)
2024 (Thursday)
2023 (Tuesday)
2022 (Monday)
2021 (Sunday)
2020 (Saturday)
2019 (Thursday)
2018 (Wednesday)
2017 (Tuesday)
2016 (Monday)

December 12 is the 346th day of the year (347th in leap years) in the Gregorian calendar; 19 days remain until the end of the year.

== Events ==
=== Pre-1600 ===
- 627 – Battle of Nineveh: A Byzantine army under Emperor Heraclius defeats Emperor Khosrau II's Persian forces, commanded by General Rhahzadh.
- 1388 – Maria of Enghien sells the lordship of Argos and Nauplia to the Republic of Venice.

=== 1601–1900 ===
- 1787 – Pennsylvania becomes the second state to ratify the US Constitution.
- 1862 – American Civil War: USS Cairo sinks on the Yazoo River.
- 1866 – Oaks explosion: The worst mining disaster in England kills 361 miners and rescuers.
- 1870 – Joseph H. Rainey of South Carolina becomes the second black U.S. congressman.

=== 1901–present ===
- 1901 – Guglielmo Marconi receives the first transatlantic radio signal (the letter "S" [•••] in Morse Code), at Signal Hill in St John's, Newfoundland.
- 1915 – Yuan Shikai declares the establishment of the Empire of China and proclaims himself Emperor.
- 1917 – Father Edward J. Flanagan founds Boys Town as a farm village for wayward boys.
- 1935 – The Lebensborn Project, a Nazi reproduction program, is founded by Heinrich Himmler.
- 1936 – The beginning of Xi'an incident. As a result, Chiang Kai Shek is captured.
- 1937 – Second Sino-Japanese War: USS Panay incident: Japanese aircraft bomb and sink U.S. gunboat USS Panay on the Yangtze river in China.
- 1939 – HMS Duchess sinks after a collision with HMS Barham off the coast of Scotland with the loss of 124 men.
- 1939 – Winter War: The Battle of Tolvajärvi, also known as the first major Finnish victory in the Winter War, begins.
- 1941 – World War II: Fifty-four Japanese A6M Zero fighters raid Batangas Field, Philippines. Jesús Villamor and four Filipino fighter pilots fend them off; César Basa is killed.
- 1941 – The Holocaust: Adolf Hitler declares the imminent extermination of the Jews at a meeting in the Reich Chancellery.
- 1945 – The People's Republic of Korea is outlawed in the South, by order of the United States Army Military Government in Korea.
- 1946 – United Nations Security Council Resolution 13 relating to acceptance of Siam (now Thailand) to the United Nations is adopted.
- 1956 – United Nations Security Council Resolution 121 relating to acceptance of Japan to the United Nations is adopted.
- 1963 – Kenya declares independence from Great Britain.
- 1969 – The Piazza Fontana bombing; a bomb explodes at the headquarters of Banca Nazionale dell'Agricoltura (the National Agricultural Bank) in Piazza Fontana in Milan, Italy, killing 17 people and wounding 88. The same afternoon, three more bombs are detonated in Rome and Milan, and another is found unexploded.
- 1979 – The 8.2 M_{w} Tumaco earthquake shakes Colombia and Ecuador with a maximum Mercalli intensity of IX (Violent), killing 300–600, and generating a large tsunami.
- 1979 – Coup d'état of December Twelfth occurs in South Korea.
- 1985 – Arrow Air Flight 1285R, a McDonnell Douglas DC-8, crashes after takeoff in Gander, Newfoundland, killing all 256 people on board, including 236 members of the United States Army's 101st Airborne Division.
- 1988 – The Clapham Junction rail crash kills thirty-five and injures hundreds after two collisions of three commuter trains—one of the worst train crashes in the United Kingdom.
- 1999 – A magnitude 7.3 earthquake hits the Philippines's main island of Luzon, killing six people, injuring 40, and causing power outages that affected the capital Manila.
- 2000 – The United States Supreme Court releases its decision in Bush v. Gore.
- 2001 – Prime Minister of Vietnam Phan Văn Khải announces the decision on upgrading the Phong Nha–Kẻ Bàng nature reserve to a national park, providing information on projects for the conservation and development of the park and revised maps.
- 2012 – North Korea successfully launches its first satellite, Kwangmyŏngsŏng-3 Unit 2.
- 2015 – The Paris Agreement relating to United Nations Framework Convention on Climate Change is adopted.
- 2021 – Dutch Formula One racing driver Max Verstappen wins the controversial 2021 Abu Dhabi Grand Prix, beating seven-time World Champion Lewis Hamilton to become the first Formula One World Champion to come from the Netherlands.
- 2024 – Indian Grandmaster Gukesh Dommaraju became the undisputed World Chess Champion in a tournament held in Singapore, making him the 18th and the youngest champion in chess history.

== Births ==
=== Pre-1600 ===
- 1526 – Álvaro de Bazán, 1st Marquis of Santa Cruz, Spanish admiral (died 1588)

=== 1601–1900 ===
- 1685 – Lodovico Giustini, Italian pianist and composer (died 1743)
- 1724 – Samuel Hood, 1st Viscount Hood, English admiral and politician (died 1816)
- 1786 – William L. Marcy, American lawyer, judge, and politician, 21st United States Secretary of State (died 1857)
- 1799 – Karl Bryullov, Russian painter (died 1852)
- 1805 – Henry Wells, American businessman, co-founded Wells Fargo and American Express (died 1878)
- 1806 – Stand Watie, American general (died 1871)
- 1812 – John Sandfield Macdonald, Canadian lawyer and politician, 1st Premier of Ontario (died 1872)
- 1821 – Gustave Flaubert, French novelist (died 1880)
- 1830 – Joseph Orville Shelby, Confederate general (died 1897)
- 1842 – Adolf Bötticher, German journalist and historian (died 1901)
- 1845 – Bruce Price, American architect, designed the American Surety Building and Bank of the Metropolis (died 1903)
- 1863 – Edvard Munch, Norwegian painter (died 1944)
- 1866 – Alfred Werner, Swiss chemist and academic, Nobel Prize laureate (died 1919)
- 1870 – Walter Benona Sharp, American businessman, co-founded Hughes Tool Company (died 1912)
- 1876 – Alvin Kraenzlein, American hurdler and runner (died 1928)
- 1881 – Louise Thuliez, French school teacher, resistance fighter during World War I and World War II and author (died 1966)
- 1893 – Edward G. Robinson, American actor (died 1973)

=== 1901–present ===
- 1901 – Harald Kaarmann, Estonian footballer (died 1942)
- 1907 – Roy Douglas, English pianist and composer (died 2015)
- 1912 – Henry Armstrong, American boxer (died 1988)
- 1914 – Patrick O'Brian, English author (died 2000)
- 1915 – Frank Sinatra, American singer, actor, and producer (died 1998)
- 1918 – Joe Williams, American singer and pianist (died 1999)
- 1920 – Josef Doležal, Czech race walker (died 1999)
- 1923 – Bob Barker, American game show host and producer (died 2023)
- 1923 – Bob Dorough, American musician, composer, and producer (died 2018)
- 1923 – Emahoy Tsegué-Maryam Guèbrou, Ethiopian pianist, composer and nun (died 2023)
- 1924 – Ed Koch, American politician, 105th Mayor of New York City (died 2013)
- 1925 – Ted Kennedy, Canadian ice hockey player (died 2009)
- 1925 – Dattu Phadkar, Indian cricketer (died 1985)
- 1925 – Vladimir Shainsky, Ukrainian-Russian pianist and composer (died 2017)
- 1926 – Étienne-Émile Baulieu, French biochemist and endocrinologist (died 2025)
- 1927 – Robert Noyce, American inventor and businessman, co-founded the Intel Corporation (died 1990)
- 1928 – Helen Frankenthaler, American painter and academic (died 2011)
- 1929 – Toshiko Akiyoshi, Japanese pianist and composer
- 1932 – Bob Pettit, American basketball player and coach (died 2026)
- 1933 – Christa Stubnick, German sprinter (died 2021)
- 1934 – Miguel de la Madrid, Mexican lawyer and politician, 52nd President of Mexico (died 2012)
- 1936 – Iolanda Balaș, Romanian high jumper and educator (died 2016)
- 1937 – Connie Francis, American singer, musician, and actress (died 2025)
- 1937 – Philip Ledger, English pianist, composer, and academic (died 2012)
- 1940 – Sharad Pawar, Indian politician, Indian Minister of Agriculture
- 1940 – Dionne Warwick, American singer
- 1942 – Bob Thompson, American jazz pianist, composer and arranger
- 1943 – Dickey Betts, American musician and songwriter (died 2024)
- 1943 – Grover Washington, Jr., American singer-songwriter, saxophonist, and producer (died 1999)
- 1945 – Gísli S. Einarsson, Icelandic politician
- 1945 – Tony Williams, American drummer, composer, and producer (died 1997)
- 1946 – Emerson Fittipaldi, Brazilian racing driver
- 1947 – Wings Hauser, American actor (died 2025)
- 1947 – Don Keith, American writer
- 1947 – Chris Mullin, English journalist and politician
- 1948 – Randy Smith, American basketball player (died 2009)
- 1948 – Colin Todd, English football player and coach
- 1949 – Bill Nighy, English actor
- 1949 – Marc Ravalomanana, Malagasy businessman and politician, President of Madagascar
- 1949 – David Abulafia, English historian (died 2026)
- 1950 – Pedro Ferriz de Con, Mexican journalist
- 1950 – Heiner Flassbeck, German economist and academic
- 1950 – Rajinikanth, Indian actor
- 1950 – Billy Smith, Canadian ice hockey player, coach, and manager
- 1950 – Gorman Thomas, American baseball player
- 1951 – Rehman Malik, Pakistani politician, Pakistani Minister of Interior (died 2022)
- 1952 – Cathy Rigby, American gymnast
- 1953 – Martin Ferguson, Australian lawyer and politician
- 1953 – Rafael Septién, Mexican-American football player
- 1955 – Chris Phelan, Irish-Australian rugby league player (died 2026)
- 1955 – Eddy Schepers, Belgian cyclist
- 1955 – Stephen Smith, Australian politician
- 1956 – Johan van der Velde, Dutch cyclist
- 1957 – Sheila E., American singer and musician
- 1958 – Sheree J. Wilson, American actress
- 1960 – Martina Hellmann, German discus thrower
- 1961 – Andrey Perlov, Russian race walker
- 1962 – Tracy Austin, American tennis player and sportscaster
- 1962 – Arturo Barrios, Mexican-American runner
- 1962 – Mike Golic, American football player and radio host
- 1963 – Eduardo Castro Luque, Mexican businessman and politician (died 2012)
- 1964 – Haywood Jeffires, American football player and coach
- 1964 – Sabu, American wrestler(died 2025)
- 1965 – Russell Batiste Jr., American funk and R&B drummer (died 2023)
- 1965 – Will Carling, English rugby union player
- 1967 – John Randle, American football player
- 1968 – Sašo Udovič, Slovenian footballer
- 1969 – Wilfred Kirochi, Kenyan runner
- 1969 – Fiona May, English-Italian long jumper
- 1969 – Michael Möllenbeck, German discus thrower (died 2022)
- 1970 – Mädchen Amick, American actress and director
- 1970 – Tahir Bilgiç Turkish-Australian comedian and actor
- 1970 – Jennifer Connelly, American actress
- 1970 – Regina Hall, American actress
- 1971 – Sammy Korir, Kenyan runner
- 1972 – Nicky Eaden, English footballer and coach
- 1972 – Craig Field, Australian rugby league player
- 1972 – Wilson Kipketer, Kenyan-Danish runner
- 1972 – Georgios Theodoridis, Greek sprinter
- 1974 – Bernard Lagat, Kenyan-American runner
- 1974 – Nolberto Solano, Peruvian footballer and manager
- 1975 – Mayim Bialik, American actress, neuroscientist, and author
- 1975 – Craig Moore, Australian footballer and manager
- 1977 – Yoel Hernández, Cuban hurdler
- 1977 – Orlando Hudson, American baseball player
- 1977 – Dean Macey, English decathlete and bobsledder
- 1977 – Colin White, Canadian ice hockey player
- 1979 – Garrett Atkins, American baseball player
- 1979 – Nate Clements, American football player
- 1979 – John Salmons, American basketball player
- 1980 – Dejene Berhanu, Ethiopian runner (died 2010)
- 1980 – Dorin Goian, Romanian footballer
- 1981 – Eddie Kingston, American wrestler
- 1981 – Pedro Ríos, Spanish footballer
- 1981 – Yuvraj Singh, Indian cricketer
- 1981 – Stephen Warnock, English footballer
- 1981 – Andrew Whitworth, American football player and commentator
- 1982 – Ervin Santana, Dominican baseball player
- 1982 – Dmitry Tursunov, Russian tennis player and coach
- 1983 – Roni Porokara, Finnish footballer
- 1984 – Daniel Agger, Danish footballer
- 1985 – Pat Calathes, Greek-American basketball player
- 1985 – Andrew Ladd, Canadian ice hockey player
- 1986 – Daddy Birori, Rwandan footballer
- 1986 – Përparim Hetemaj, Finnish footballer
- 1986 – Nina Kolarič, Slovenian long jumper
- 1986 – Kirsikka Lansmann, German politician
- 1986 – T. J. Ward, American football player
- 1988 – Isaac John, New Zealand rugby league player
- 1988 – Lonah Chemtai Salpeter, Israeli Olympic marathon runner
- 1990 – Nixon Chepseba, Kenyan runner
- 1990 – Dawin, American singer-songwriter
- 1990 – Victor Moses, Nigerian footballer
- 1990 – Tyron Smith, American football player
- 1991 – Shohjahon Ergashev, Uzbek professional boxer
- 1991 – Joseph Leilua, Australian-Samoan rugby league player
- 1993 – Zeli Ismail, English footballer
- 1994 – Otto Warmbier, American student imprisoned in North Korea (died 2017)
- 1996 – Lucas Hedges, American actor
- 1997 – Ed Oliver, American football player
- 2001 – Michael Olise, French footballer

== Deaths ==
=== Pre-1600 ===
- 884 – King Carloman II of the Franks (born c.866; hunting accident)
- 1204 – Maimonides, Jewish physician, philosopher, and scholar (born 1135 or 1138)
- 1296 – Isabella of Mar, first wife of Robert Bruce VII (born 1277)
- 1572 – Loredana Marcello, Dogaressa of Venice, botanist, author

=== 1601–1900 ===
- 1751 – Henry St John, 1st Viscount Bolingbroke, English philosopher and politician, Secretary at War (born 1678)
- 1766 – Johann Christoph Gottsched, German philosopher, author, and critic (born 1700)
- 1794 – Meshullam Feivush Heller, Ukrainian author (born 1742)
- 1803 – Prince Frederick Adolf of Sweden (born 1750)
- 1858 – Jacques Viger, Canadian archeologist and politician, 1st Mayor of Montreal (born 1787)
- 1889 – Viktor Bunyakovsky, Ukrainian-Russian mathematician and theorist (born 1804)
- 1894 – John Sparrow David Thompson, Canadian lawyer, judge, and politician, 4th Prime Minister of Canada (born 1845)

=== 1901–present ===
- 1913 – Menelik II, Ethiopian emperor (born 1844)
- 1921 – Henrietta Swan Leavitt, American astronomer and academic (born 1868)
- 1923 – Raymond Radiguet, French author and poet (born 1903)
- 1934 – Thorleif Haug, Norwegian skier (born 1894)
- 1939 – Douglas Fairbanks, Sr., American actor, producer, and screenwriter (born 1883)
- 1941 – César Basa, Filipino lieutenant and pilot (born 1915)
- 1948 – Marjory Stephenson, British biochemist (born 1885)
- 1951 – Mildred Bailey, American singer (born 1907)
- 1958 – Albert Walsh, Canadian lawyer and politician, 1st Lieutenant Governor of Newfoundland (born 1900)
- 1966 – Karl Ruberl, Austrian-American swimmer (born 1880)
- 1968 – Tallulah Bankhead, American actress (born 1902)
- 1970 – Doris Blackburn, Australian politician (born 1889)
- 1975 – Richard Baggallay, English colonel and cricketer (born 1884)
- 1980 – Jean Lesage, Canadian lawyer and politician, 19th Premier of Quebec (born 1912)
- 1985 – Anne Baxter, American actress (born 1923)
- 1985 – Ian Stewart, Scottish keyboardist and manager (born 1938)
- 1993 – József Antall, Hungarian historian and politician, 35th Prime Minister of Hungary (born 1932)
- 1994 – Stuart Roosa, American colonel, pilot, and astronaut (born 1933)
- 1996 – Vance Packard, American journalist, author, and critic (born 1914)
- 1997 – Evgenii Landis, Ukrainian-Russian mathematician and academic (born 1921)
- 1998 – Lawton Chiles, American soldier, lawyer, and politician, 41st Governor of Florida (born 1930)
- 1998 – Morris Udall, American captain and politician (born 1922)
- 1999 – Paul Cadmus, American painter and illustrator (born 1904)
- 1999 – Joseph Heller, American novelist, short story writer, and playwright(born 1923)
- 2001 – Ardito Desio, Italian geologist and explorer (born 1897)
- 2002 – Dee Brown, American historian and author (born 1908)
- 2003 – Heydar Aliyev, Azerbaijani general and politician, 3rd President of Azerbaijan (born 1923)
- 2005 – Robert Newmyer, American actor and producer (born 1956)
- 2005 – Annette Stroyberg, Danish actress (born 1936)
- 2005 – Gebran Tueni, Lebanese journalist and politician (born 1957)
- 2006 – Paul Arizin, American basketball player (born 1928)
- 2006 – Peter Boyle, American actor (born 1935)
- 2006 – Raymond P. Shafer, American attorney and politician, 39th Governor of Pennsylvania (born 1917)
- 2006 – Alan Shugart, American engineer and businessman, co-founded Seagate Technology (born 1930)
- 2007 – François al-Hajj, Lebanese general (born 1953)
- 2007 – Ike Turner, American singer-songwriter, guitarist, and producer (born 1931)
- 2008 – Avery Dulles, American cardinal and theologian (born 1918)
- 2008 – Van Johnson, American actor (born 1916)
- 2010 – Tom Walkinshaw, Scottish race car driver, founded Tom Walkinshaw Racing (born 1946)
- 2012 – Joe Allbritton, American banker, publisher, and philanthropist, founded the Allbritton Communications Company (born 1924)
- 2012 – David Tait, English rugby player (born 1987)
- 2013 – Tom Laughlin, American actor, director, screenwriter, author, educator, and activist (born 1931)
- 2013 – Abdul Quader Molla, Bangladeshi journalist and politician (born 1948)
- 2013 – Audrey Totter, American actress (born 1917)
- 2014 – Norman Bridwell, American author and illustrator, created Clifford the Big Red Dog (born 1928)
- 2014 – Ivor Grattan-Guinness, English mathematician, historian, and academic (born 1941)
- 2014 – Herb Plews, American baseball player (born 1928)
- 2015 – Frans Geurtsen, Dutch footballer (born 1942)
- 2015 – Evelyn S. Lieberman, American politician, White House Deputy Chief of Staff (born 1944)
- 2016 – Shirley Hazzard, Australian-American novelist, short story writer, and essayist (born 1931)
- 2017 – Ed Lee, American politician and attorney, 43rd Mayor of San Francisco (born 1952)
- 2017 – Pat DiNizio, American singer and songwriter (born 1955)
- 2019 – Danny Aiello, American actor (born 1933)
- 2020 – John le Carré, English author (born 1931)
- 2020 – Ann Reinking, American actress, dancer, and choreographer (born 1949)
- 2021 – Vicente Fernández, Mexican actor, ranchera singer, and film producer (born 1940)
- 2021 – Bernie Fowler, American politician and environmental advocate (born 1924)
- 2021 – Maʻafu Tukuiʻaulahi, Tongan politician and military officer, Deputy Prime Minister (born 1955)

== Holidays and observances ==
- Christian feast day:
  - Corentin of Quimper
  - Jane Frances de Chantal
  - Edburga of Minster-in-Thanet
  - Finnian of Clonard
  - Thomas Holland
  - Ida of Nivelles
  - Peter the Aleut
  - Vicelinus
  - Our Lady of Guadalupe
  - December 12 (Eastern Orthodox liturgics)
- Constitution Day (Russia)
- Day of Neutrality (Turkmenistan)
