= 627 =

Calendar year

627 in various calendars
- Gregorian calendar: 627; DCXXVII
- Ab urbe condita: 1380
- Armenian calendar: 76; ԹՎ ՀԶ
- Assyrian calendar: 5377
- Balinese saka calendar: 548–549
- Bengali calendar: 33–34
- Berber calendar: 1577
- Buddhist calendar: 1171
- Burmese calendar: −11
- Byzantine calendar: 6135–6136
- Chinese calendar: 丙戌年 (Fire Dog); 3324 or 3117 — to — 丁亥年 (Fire Pig); 3325 or 3118
- Coptic calendar: 343–344
- Discordian calendar: 1793
- Ethiopian calendar: 619–620
- Hebrew calendar: 4387–4388
- Hindu calendars
- Vikram Samvat: 683–684
- Shaka Samvat: 548–549
- Kali Yuga: 3727–3728
- Holocene calendar: 10627
- Iranian calendar: 5–6
- Islamic calendar: 5–6
- Japanese calendar: N/A
- Javanese calendar: 517–518
- Julian calendar: 627; DCXXVII
- Korean calendar: 2960
- Minguo calendar: 1285 before ROC 民前1285年
- Nanakshahi calendar: −841
- Seleucid era: 938/939 AG
- Thai solar calendar: 1169–1170
- Tibetan calendar: མེ་ཕོ་ཁྱི་ལོ་ (male Fire-Dog); 753 or 372 or −400 — to — མེ་མོ་ཕག་ལོ་ (female Fire-Boar); 754 or 373 or −399

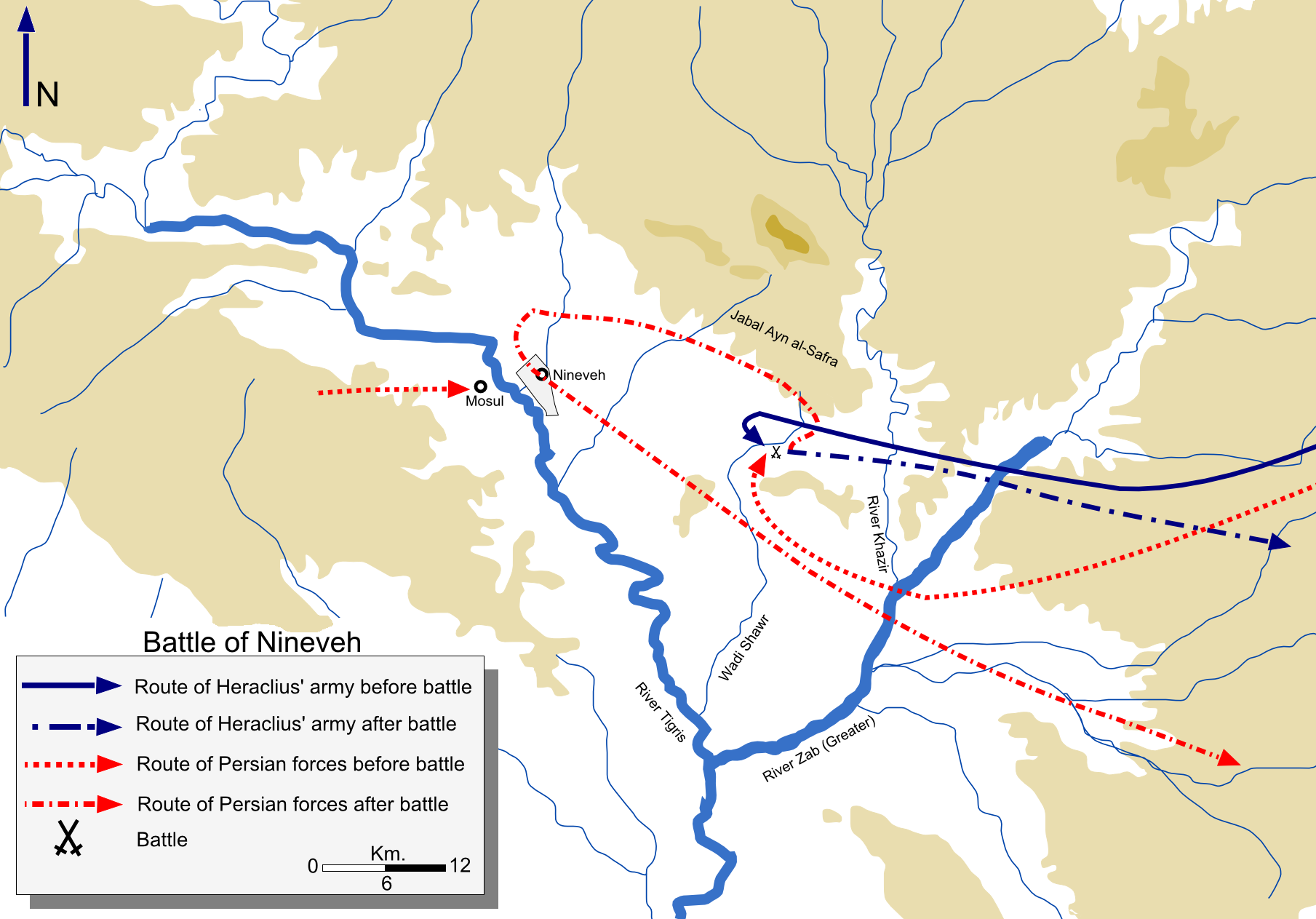
Maneuvers during the Battle of Nineveh (Iraq)

Year 627 (DCXXVII) was a common year starting on Thursday of the Julian calendar. The denomination 627 for this year has been used since the early medieval period, when the Anno Domini calendar era became the prevalent method in Europe for naming years.

== Events ==
=== By place ===
==== Byzantine Empire ====
- Spring – Byzantine–Sasanian War: Emperor Heraclius sweeps through southern Armenia with a 50,000-man expeditionary force, recapturing most of the Byzantine fortresses lost to the Persians ten and fifteen years earlier. The army of Shahrbaraz, still in Anatolia, is now cut off completely. Hearing from Byzantine agents (showing him letters) that King Khosrau II, dissatisfied with his failure to capture Constantinople, is planning to have him executed, he surrenders to Heraclius, refusing to join the Byzantine army against his ungrateful sovereign.
- Third Perso-Turkic War: The Göktürks and their Khazar allies (40,000 men) approach the Caspian Gates, and capture the Persian fortress at Derbent (modern Dagestan). Heraclius marches to the upper Tigris and invades the Persian heartland, leaving the Khazars under Tong Yabghu Qaghan to continue the siege of Tblilisi.
- December 12 – Battle of Nineveh: Heraclius crosses the Great Zab river and, in a feigned retreat, defeats the Persian army (12,000 men) under Rhahzadh, near the ruins of Nineveh (Iraq). Although wounded, Heraclius refuses to leave the battlefield, and in a final cavalry charge personally kills the Persian general.
- Winter – Heraclius plunders the city palace of Dastagird and gains tremendous riches (also recovering 300 captured Byzantine flags). He turns northeastward to Caucasian Albania to rest his army. Khosrau II flees to the mountains of Susiana, to rally support for the defense of the Persian capital Ctesiphon.

==== Britain ====
- King Eorpwald of East Anglia is murdered, and succeeded by Ricberht. He is a member of the East Anglian elite; during his rule paganism is re-established.
- April 12 – King Edwin of Northumbria is converted to Christianity by Bishop Paulinus of York, who previously saved his life.

==== Arabia ====
- March 31 – Battle of the Trench: Muhammad successfully withstands a siege for 27 days at Medina, by Meccan forces (10,000 men) under Abu Sufyan, whose allies, the Jewish tribe of Banu Qurayza, ultimately surrender to Muhammad.

=== By topic ===
==== Religion ====
- April 12 – Paulinus, last of the missionaries sent by Pope Gregory I, builds a wooden church in the old Roman legionary headquarters in York, and baptises Edwin of Northumbria as the first Christian king in northern England.
- Fourth Council of Mâcon: A council of Christian bishops approves the Monastic Rule of Saint Columbanus in the city of Mâcon (Burgundy).
- Cunibert is elected bishop of Cologne. Throughout his episcopacy, monasticism flourishes in Austrasia (approximate date).

==== Education ====
- St Peter's School, York, is founded by Paulinus.

== Births ==
- Cui Zhiwen, Tang dynasty official (d. 683)

== Deaths ==
- Amatus, Benedictine abbot and hermit
- Bonus, Byzantine general and regent
- Cathal mac Áedo, king of Cashel (Ireland)
- King Eorpwald of East Anglia (approximate date)
- Feng Deyi, chancellor of the Tang dynasty (b. 568)
- Luo Yi, official of the Sui dynasty
- Pei Ju, official of the Tang dynasty
- Rhahzadh, Persian general
- Sichilde, Frankish queen
- King Stephen I of Iberia (Georgia)
- Zaynab bint Khuzayma, wife of Muhammad (b. 595)
