= Blumberg (bei Berlin) station =

Railway station in Germany

Blumberg (b Berlin)
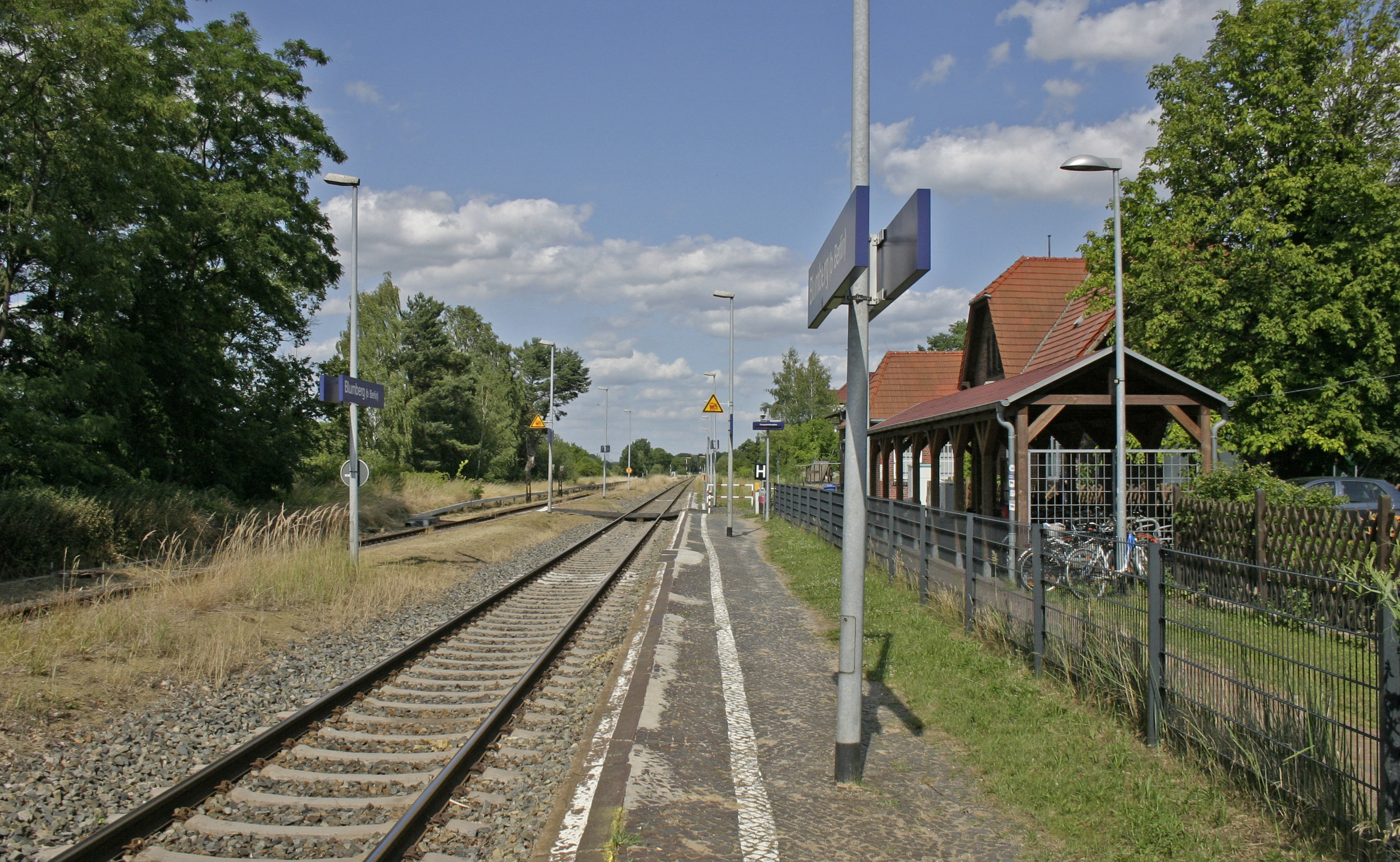
- 2015

General information
- Location: Bahnhofstraße 2; 16356 Ahrensfelde-Blumberg; Brandenburg; Germany
- Coordinates: 52.6052°N 13.6119°E
- Owner: DB Netz
- Operator: DB Station&Service
- Line: Wriezen Railway
- Platforms: 2 side platforms
- Tracks: 2
- Train operators: Niederbarnimer Eisenbahn

Other information
- Station code: 710
- DS100 code: BBLU
- IBNR: 8011211
- Category: 5
- Fare zone: : Berlin C/5359
- Website: www.bahnhof.de

History
- Opened: 1 May 1898; 128 years ago

Services
Preceding station	Niederbarnimer Eisenbahn	Following station
Blumberg-Rehhahn towards Berlin Ostkreuz	RB 25	Seefeld (Mark) towards Werneuchen
Location
- Location within Brandenburg

Blumberg (bei Berlin) station is a railway station in the Blumberg district of the municipality of Ahrensfelde, located in the Barnim district in Brandenburg, Germany. It is served by the Regionalbahn service RB 25 of the Niederbarnimer Eisenbahn.
