= Ahrensfelde Nord station =

Railway station in Germany

Ahrensfelde Nord
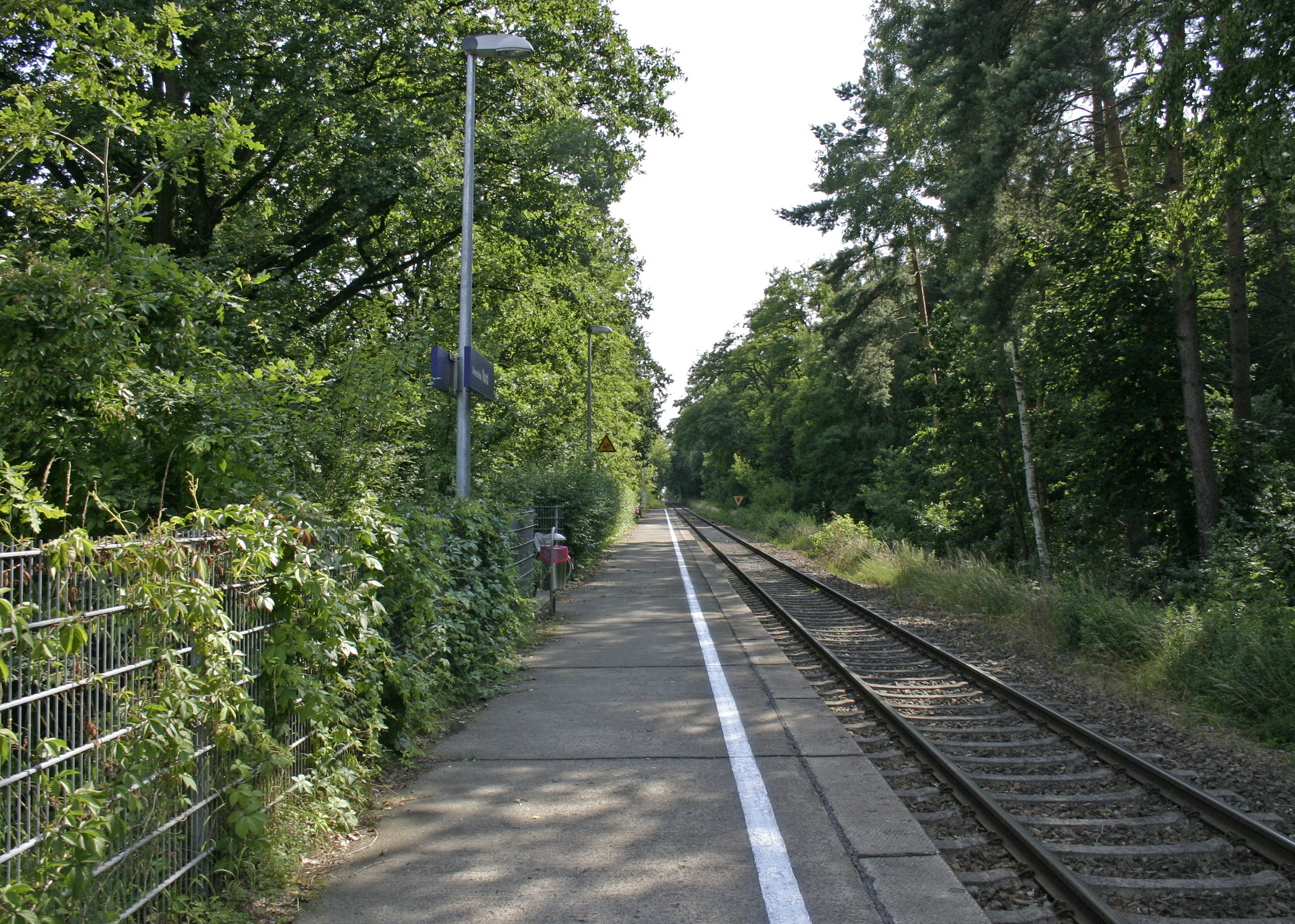
- 2015

General information
- Location: Bahnstraße 34d 16356 Ahrensfelde; Brandenburg; Germany
- Coordinates: 52.5906°N 13.5819°E
- Owner: Deutsche Bahn
- Operator: DB Netz; DB Station&Service
- Line: Wriezen Railway
- Platforms: 1 side platform
- Tracks: 1
- Train operators: Niederbarnimer Eisenbahn

Other information
- Station code: 30
- DS100 code: BAFN
- IBNR: 8011005
- Category: 6
- Fare zone: : Berlin C/5359
- Website: www.bahnhof.de

History
- Opened: May 29, 1983; 43 years ago

Services
Preceding station	Niederbarnimer Eisenbahn	Following station
Ahrensfelde Friedhof towards Berlin Ostkreuz	RB 25	Blumberg-Rehhahn towards Werneuchen
Location

Ahrensfelde Nord station, is a railway station in the northern part of the municipality of Ahrensfelde, located in the Barnim district in Brandenburg, Germany. It is served by the Regionalbahn service RB 25 of the Niederbarnimer Eisenbahn.
