= Ahrensfelde Friedhof station =

Railway station in Ahrensfelde, Germany

Ahrensfelde Friedhof
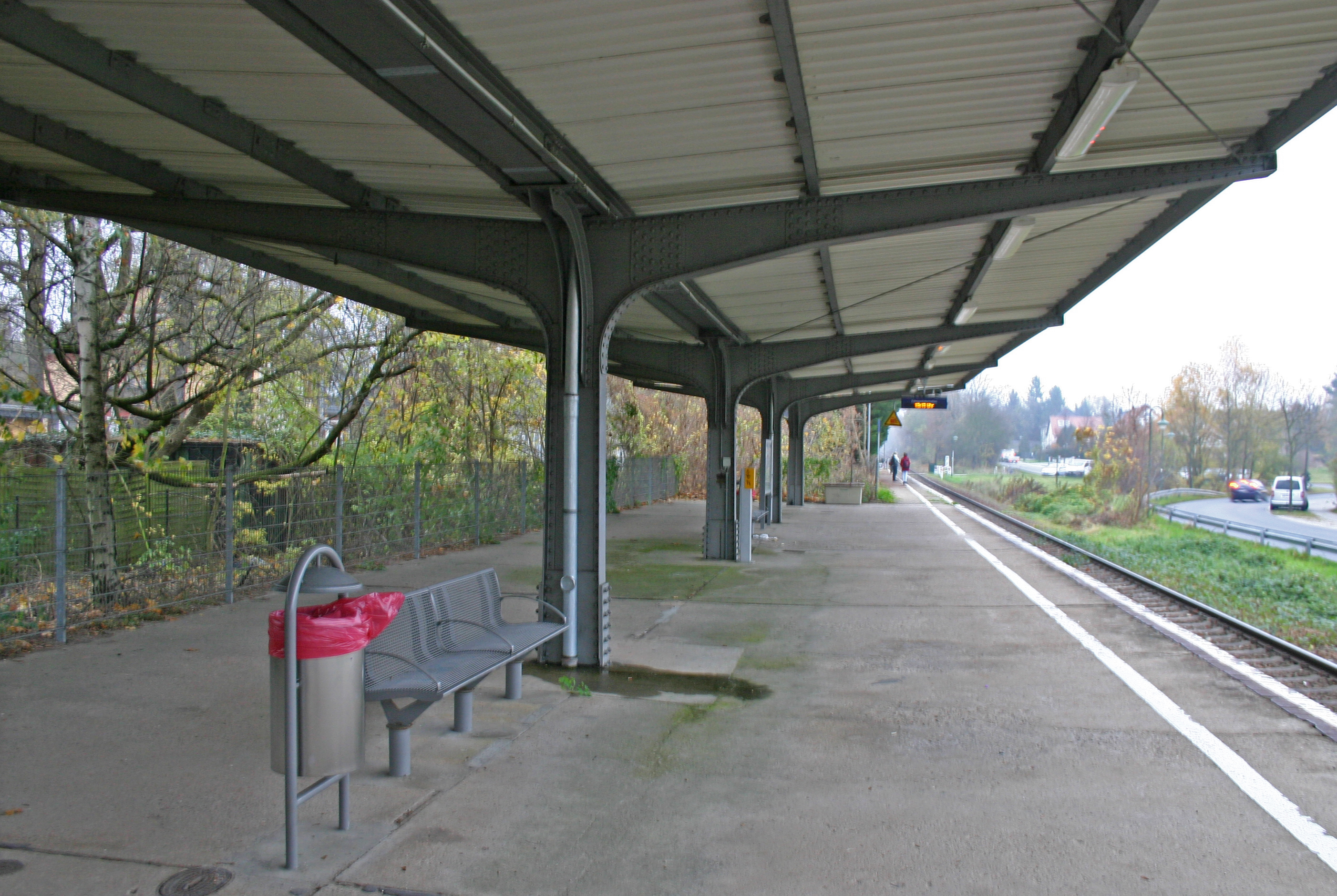
- 2014

General information
- Location: Ulmenallee 3a 16356 Ahrensfelde; Brandenburg; Germany
- Coordinates: 52.5805°N 13.5730°E
- Owner: Deutsche Bahn
- Operator: DB Netz; DB Station&Service
- Line: Wriezen Railway
- Platforms: 1 side platform
- Tracks: 1
- Train operators: Niederbarnimer Eisenbahn

Other information
- Station code: 29
- DS100 code: BAFR
- IBNR: 8011004
- Category: 6
- Fare zone: : Berlin C/5359
- Website: www.bahnhof.de

History
- Opened: 16 November 1908; 117 years ago

Services
Preceding station	Niederbarnimer Eisenbahn	Following station
Ahrensfelde towards Berlin Ostkreuz	RB 25	Ahrensfelde Nord towards Werneuchen
Location

Ahrensfelde Friedhof station, literally "Ahrensfelde Cemetery", is a railway station in the municipality of Ahrensfelde near the local cemetery, located in the Barnim district in Brandenburg, Germany. It is served by the Regionalbahn service RB 25 of the Niederbarnimer Eisenbahn.
