= Blumberg-Rehhahn station =

Railway station in Germany

Blumberg-Rehhahn
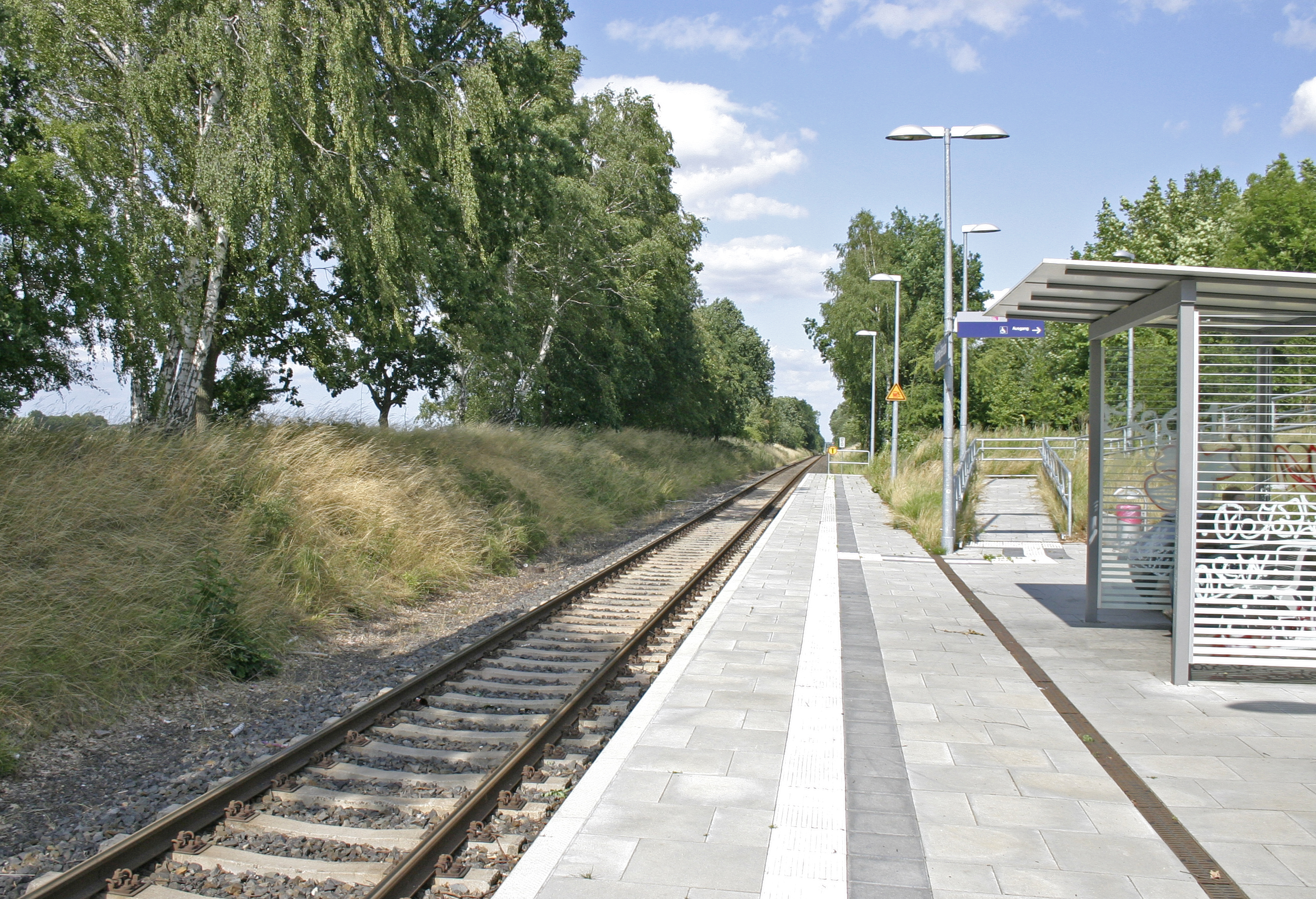
- 2015

General information
- Location: Henry-Kruse-Straße/Ehrig-Hahn-Straße; 16356 Blumberg-Rehhahn; Brandenburg; Germany
- Coordinates: 52.5968°N 13.5923°E
- Owner: Deutsche Bahn
- Operator: DB Netz; DB Station&Service
- Line: Wriezen Railway
- Platforms: 1 side platform
- Tracks: 1
- Train operators: Niederbarnimer Eisenbahn

Other information
- Station code: 8243
- DS100 code: BAHH
- IBNR: 8011064
- Category: 7
- Fare zone: : Berlin C/5459
- Website: www.bahnhof.de

History
- Opened: 13 August 2013; 13 years ago

Services
Preceding station	Niederbarnimer Eisenbahn	Following station
Ahrensfelde Nord towards Berlin Ostkreuz	RB 25	Blumberg (bei Berlin) towards Werneuchen
Location
- Location within Brandenburg

Blumberg-Rehhahn station is a railway station in the Rehhahn district of the municipality of Ahrensfelde, located in the Barnim district in Brandenburg, Germany. It is served by the Regionalbahn service RB 25 of the Niederbarnimer Eisenbahn.
