= Seefeld (Mark) station =

Railway station in Germany

Seefeld (Mark)
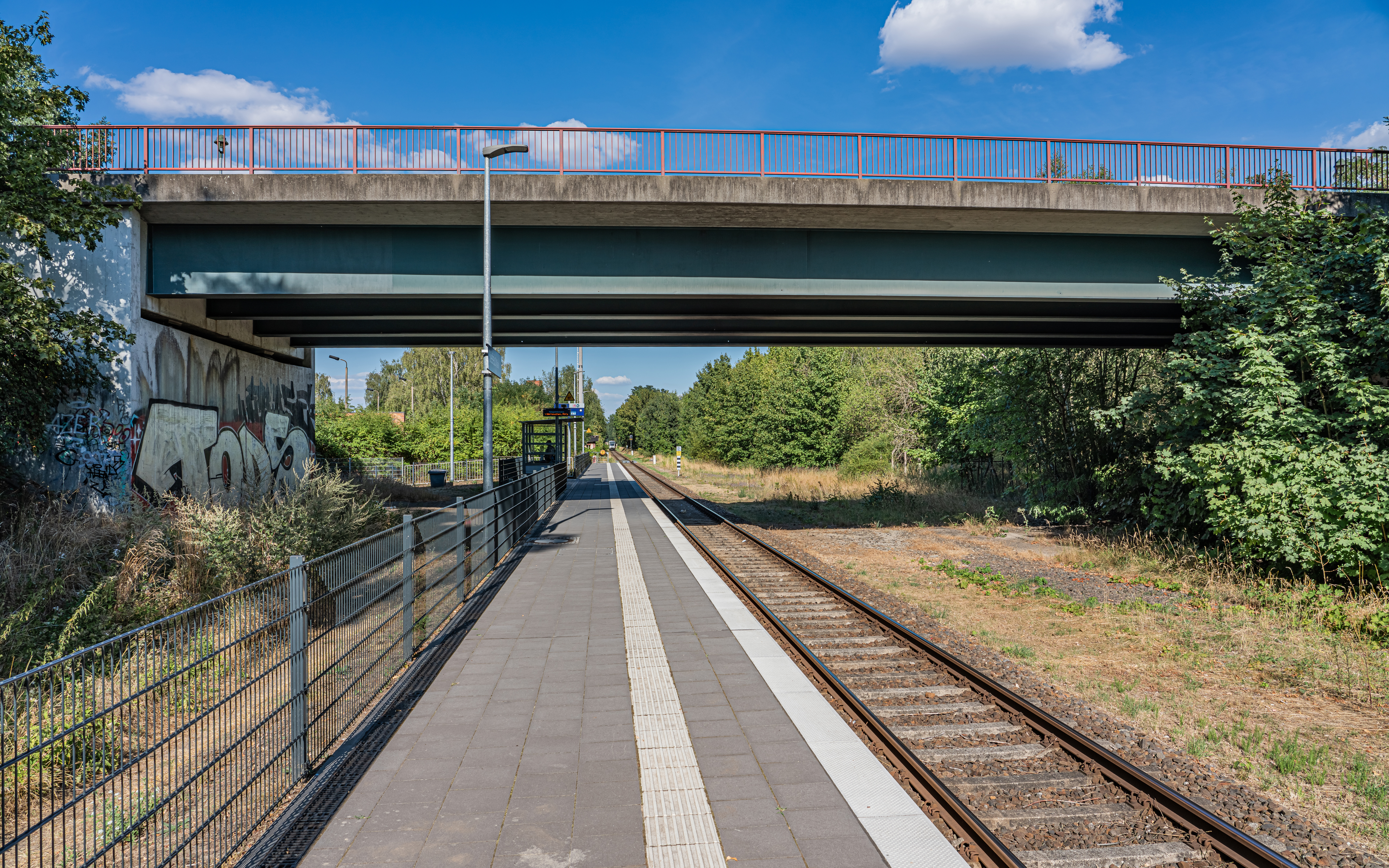
- 2022

General information
- Location: Bahnhofstraße 12b 16356 Werneuchen; Brandenburg; Germany
- Coordinates: 52.6183°N 13.6757°E
- Owner: DB Netz
- Operator: DB Station&Service
- Line: Wriezen Railway
- Platforms: 1 side platform
- Tracks: 1
- Train operators: Niederbarnimer Eisenbahn

Other information
- Station code: 5783
- DS100 code: BSEE
- IBNR: 8012966
- Category: 6
- Fare zone: : Berlin C/5260
- Website: www.bahnhof.de

History
- Opened: 1 May 1898; 128 years ago

Services
| Preceding station | Niederbarnimer Eisenbahn | Following station |
|---|---|---|
| Blumberg (bei Berlin) towards Berlin Ostkreuz | RB 25 | Werneuchen Terminus |
Location
- Location within Brandenburg

Seefeld (Mark) station is a railway station in the Seefeld district of the municipality of Werneuchen, located in the Barnim district in Brandenburg, Germany. It is served by the Regionalbahn service RB 25 of the Niederbarnimer Eisenbahn.
