= Kirsikka Lansmann =

German politician (born 1986)

Member of the Landtag of Lower Saxony
- Incumbent
- Assumed office 8 November 2022
- Preceded by: Tobias Heilmann
- Constituency: Gifhorn-Nord/Wolfsburg

Personal details
- Born: 12 December 1986 (age 39)
- Party: Social Democratic Party

Kirsikka Anna Lansmann (born 12 December 1986) is a German politician serving as a member of the Landtag of Lower Saxony since 2022. She has served as education policy spokesperson of the Social Democratic Party group since 2025.
