= Adolf Bötticher =

German art historian and conservator

Adolf Bötticher or Adolf Boetticher (12 December 1842 – 9 June 1901) was a German art historian and conservator.

Bötticher was born in Blumberg, Brandenburg, and studied at the Bauakademie in Berlin (1865–68). After performing excavatory work in Greece from 1875 to 1877, he published a weekly newspaper for architects and engineers (Wochenblatt für Architekten und Ingenieure). In 1886 Bötticher headed the registry for historic buildings and art monuments in East Prussia, and in 1891 he was named conservator for the province. He died in Warnicken.

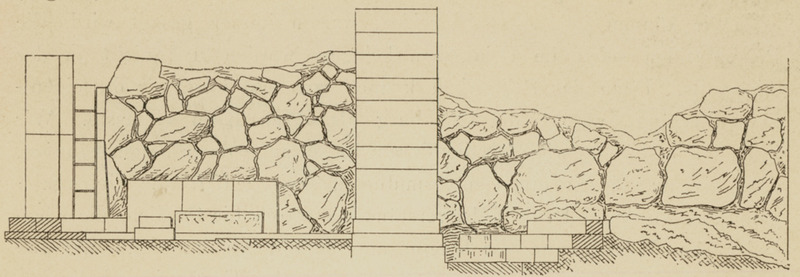
Pelasgic wall, illustration from Die Akropolis von Athen (1888).

== Published works ==
From 1891 to 1898 he published the 8-volume Die Bau und Kunstdenkmäler der Provinz Ostpreussen (9th volume, 1899 by Walther von Schimmelfennig), documenting architectural and artistic landmarks of East Prussia. Other noted works by Bötticher include:

- Auf griechischen Landstrassen, 1883 – On Greek country roads.
- Olympia, das fest und seine stätte, nach den berichten der alten und den ergebnissen der deutschen augrabungen, 1886 – Olympia, the festival and its site, according to old records and the results of German excavations.
- Die Akropolis von Athen nach den berichten der alten und den neusten erforschungen, 1888 – The Acropolis of Athens, according to old reports and the latest research.
