= 2024 Brandenburg local elections =

Local elections in Germany

- 9 June 2024

938 seats on district councils and independent city councils
- Turnout: 1,406,103 (66.03%) ▲7.61%
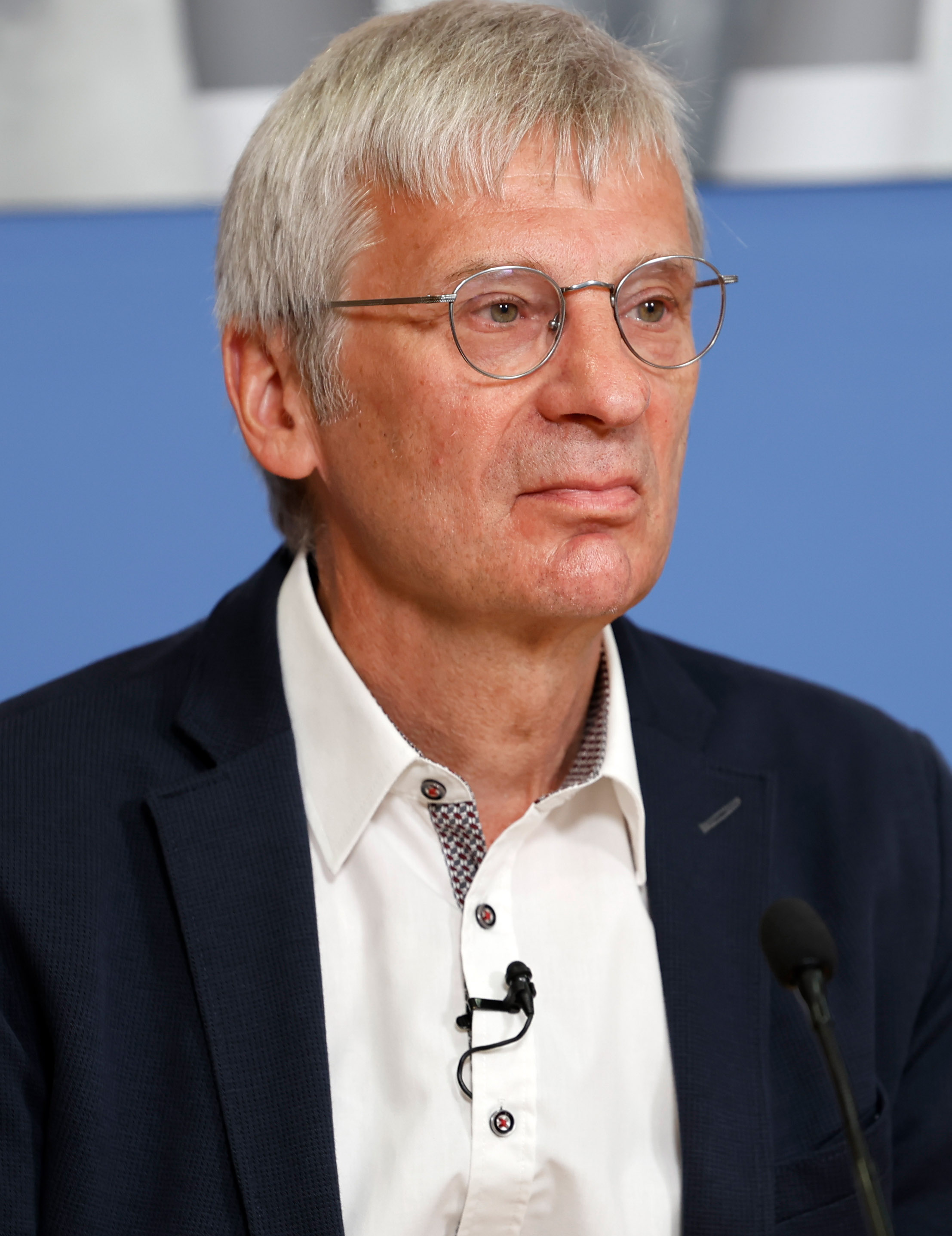

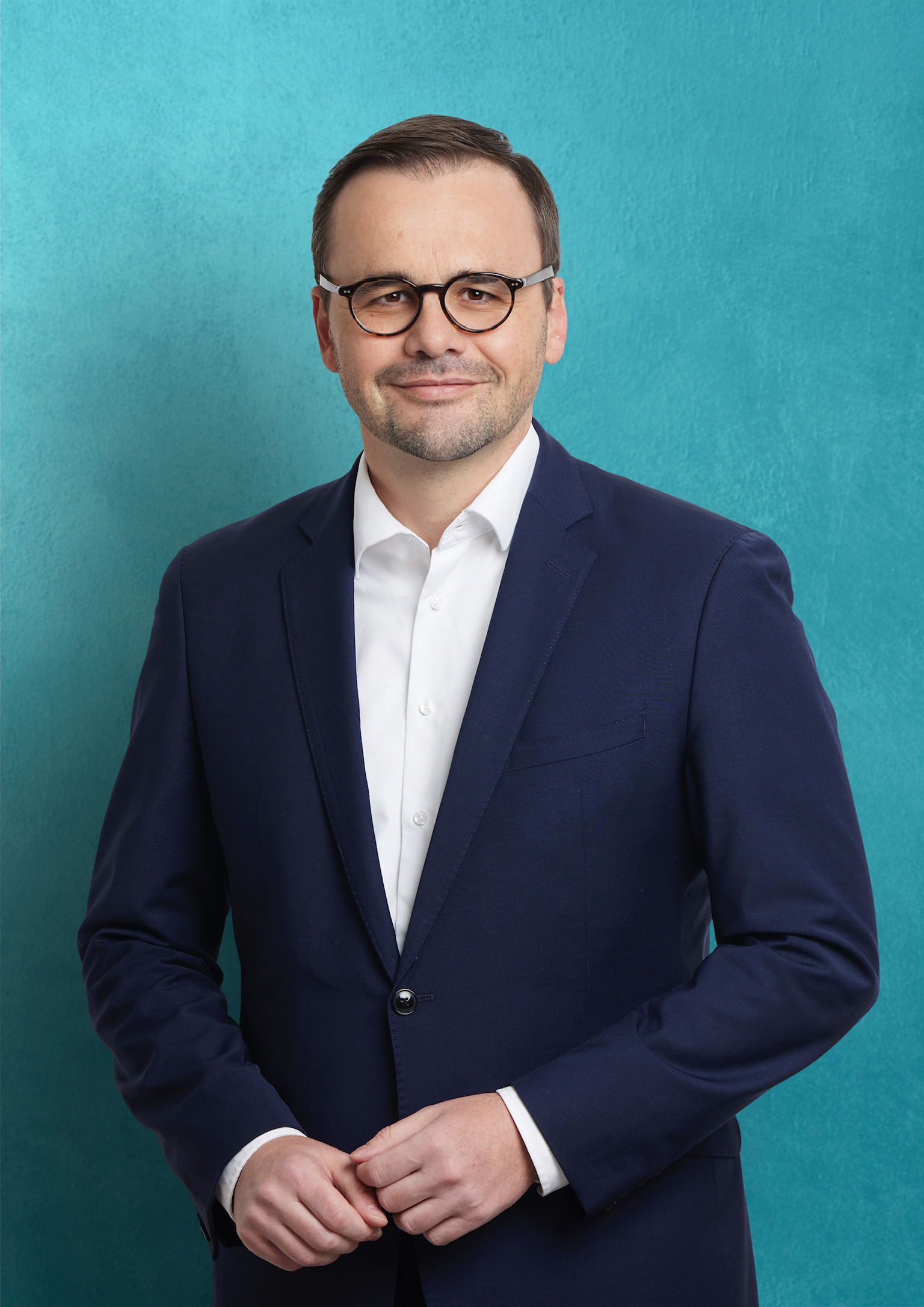

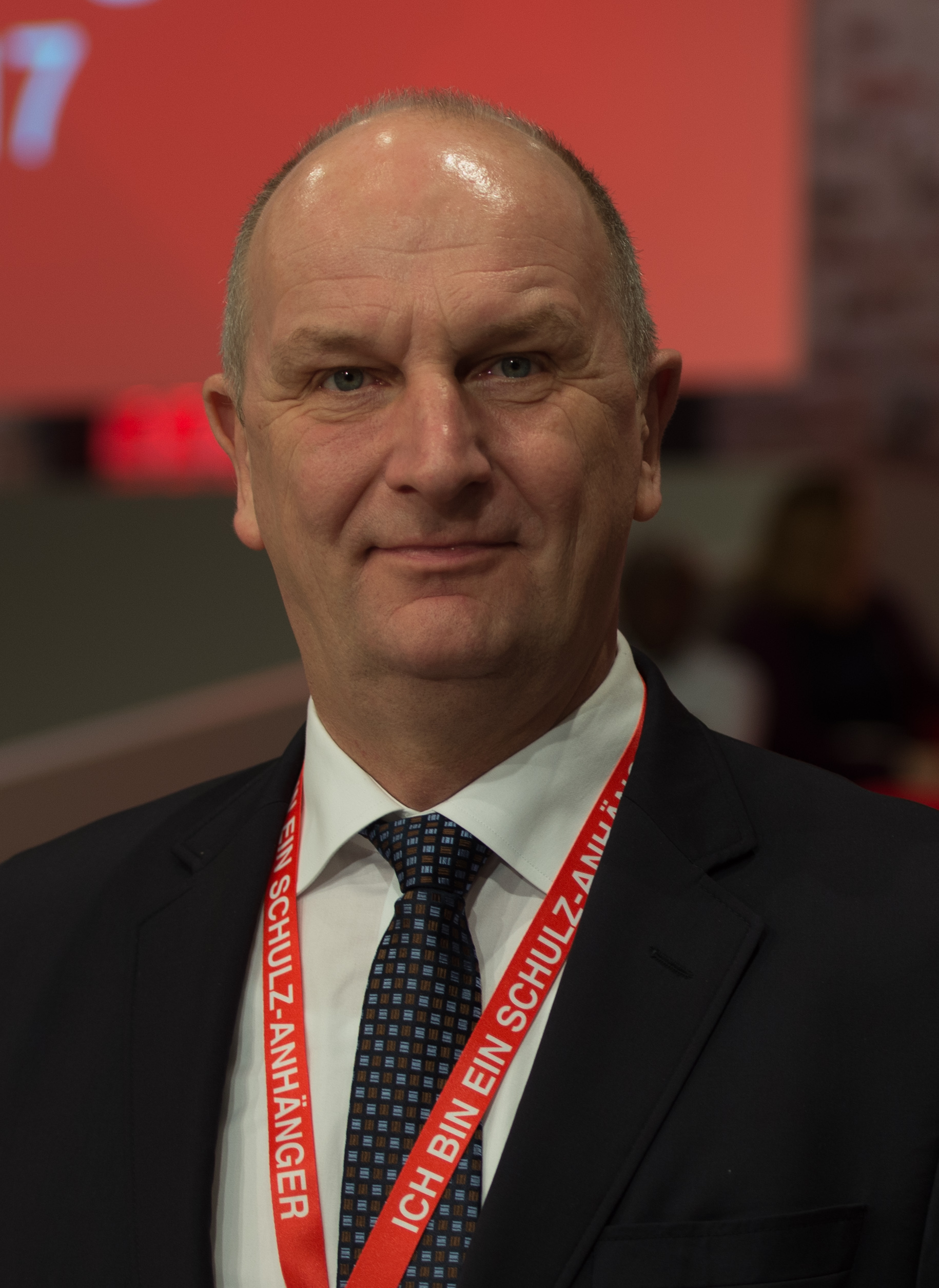

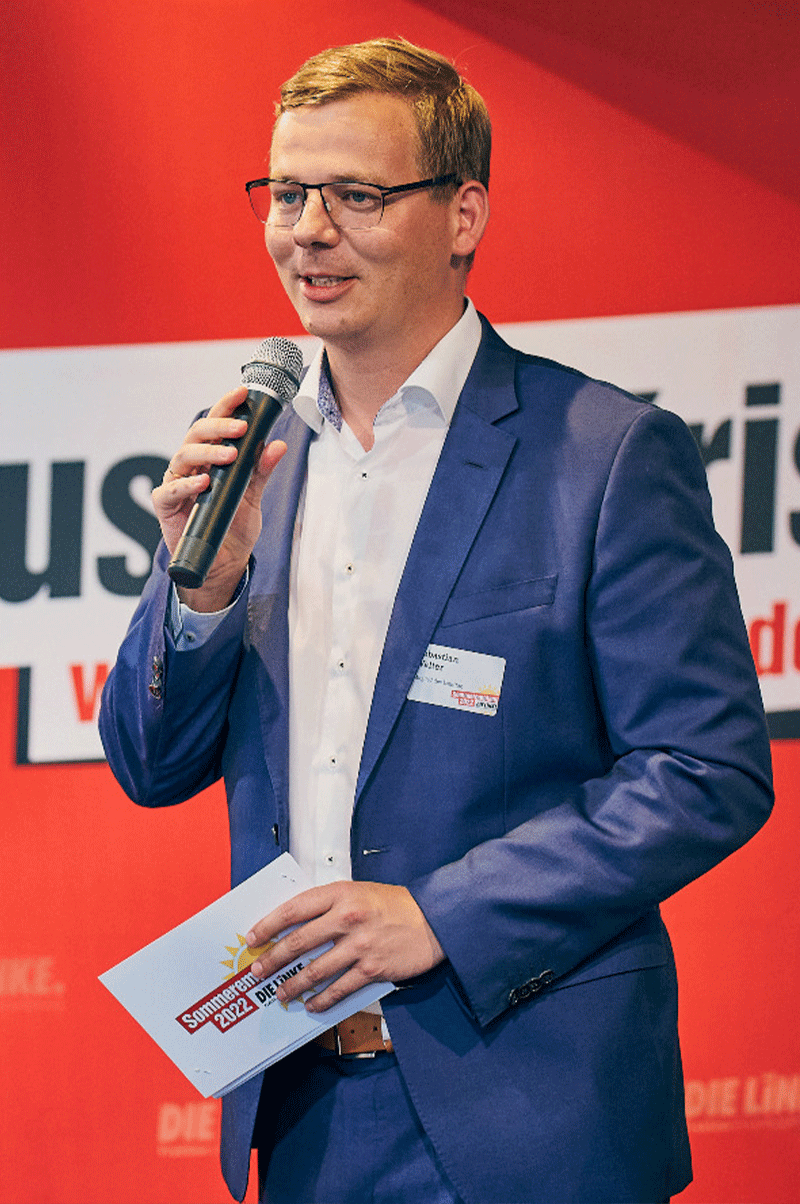

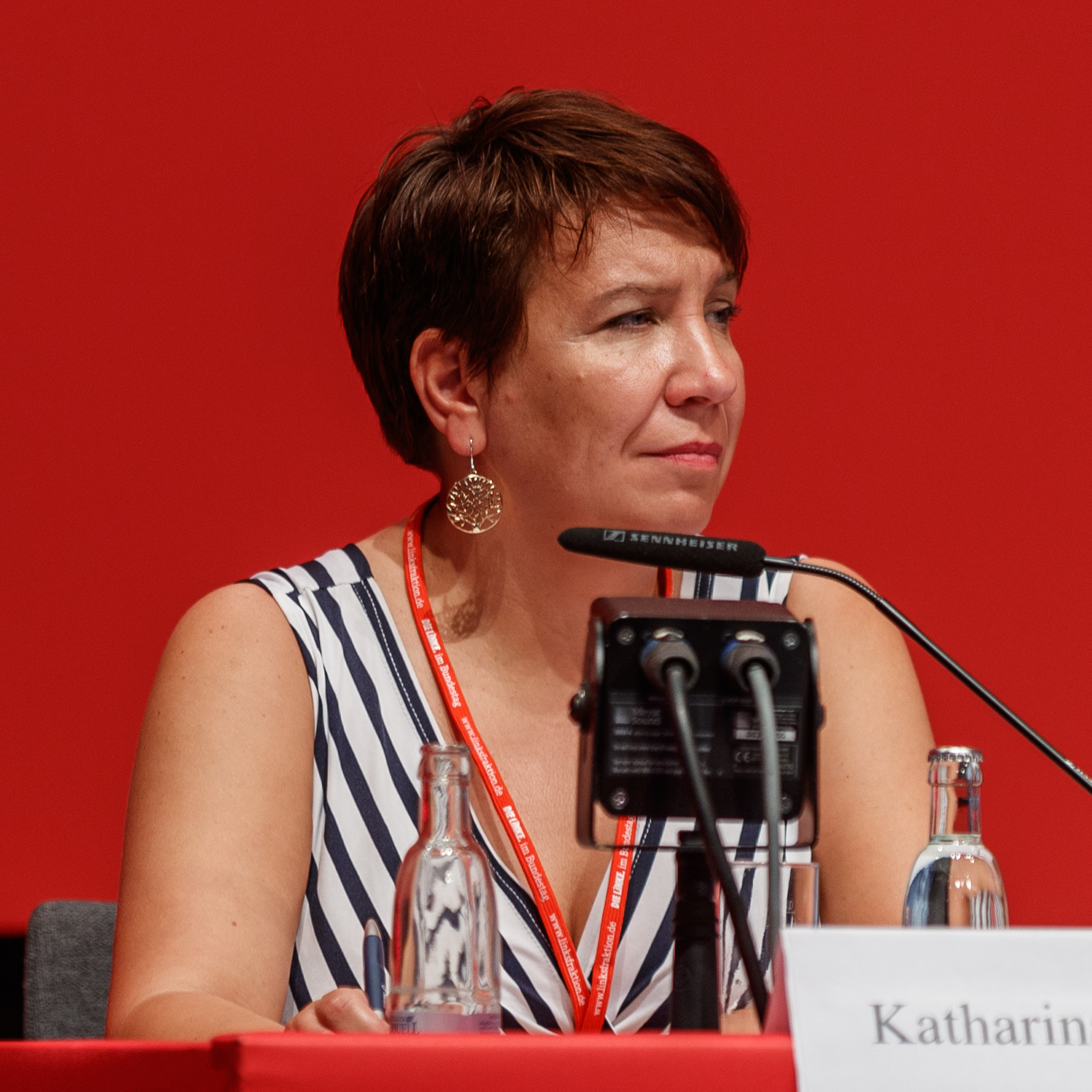

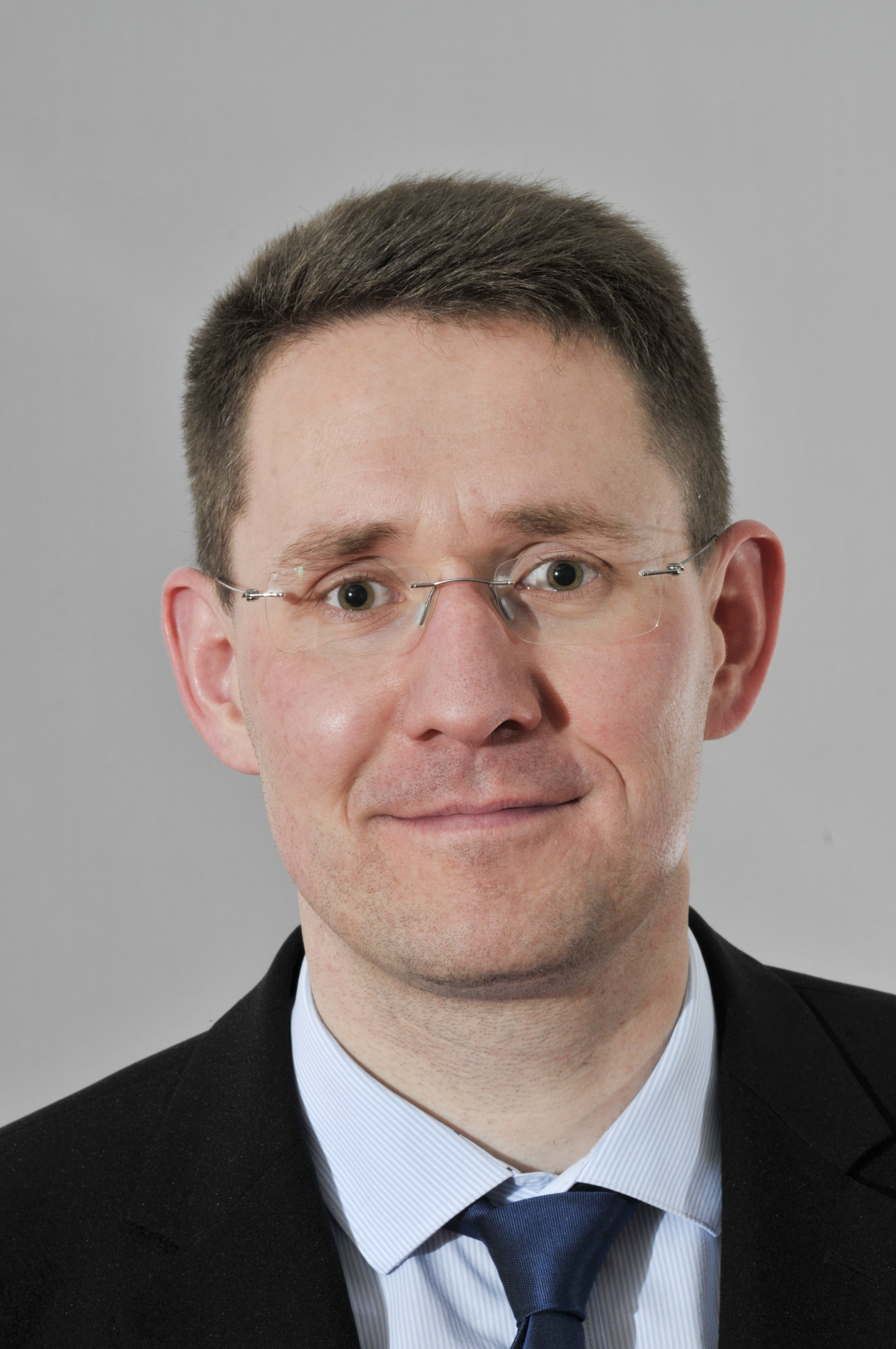

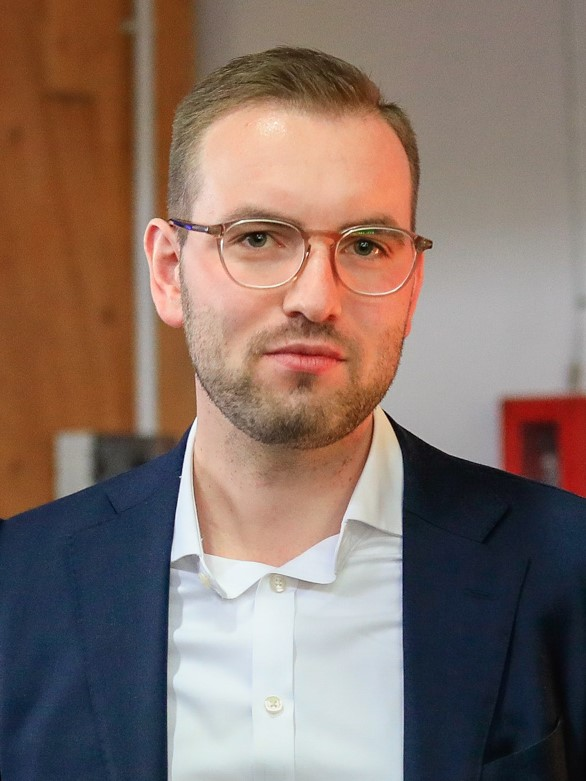
	First party	Second party	Third party
Leader	Hans-Christoph Berndt	Jan Redmann	Dietmar Woidke
Party	AfD	CDU	SPD
Last election	153 seats, 15.90%	178 seats, 18.26%	164 seats, 17.67%
Seats won	248	184	153
Seat change	▲95	▲6	▼11
Popular vote	1,051,634	787,192	677,391
Percentage	25.74%	19.27%	16.58%
Swing	▲9.84%	▲1.01%	▼1.09%
	Fourth party	Fifth party	Sixth party
Leader	Sebastian Walter & Katharina Slanina	Péter Vida	Alexandra Pichl & Hanna Große Holtrup
Party	Linke	BVB/FW	Greens
Last election	134 seats, 14.08%	60 seats, 6.32%	98 seats, 11.06%
Seats won	74	67	59
Seat change	▼60	▲7	▼39
Popular vote	319,573	302,858	272,691
Percentage	7.82%	7.41%	6.67%
Swing	▼6.26%	▲1.09%	▼4.39%
	Seventh party	Eighth party
Leader	Zyon Braun	Holger Hiestermann
Party	FDP	PARTEI
Last election	46 seats, 4.94%	5 seats, 0.54%
Seats won	29	7
Seat change	▼17	▲2
Popular vote	132,529	39,472
Percentage	3.24%	0.97%
Swing	▼1.70%	▲0.43%

The 2024 Brandenburg local elections were held on June 9, 2024 to elect members of Brandenburg's 14 district councils and 4 independent city councils. Voters also elected members of 409 municipal councils. The elections were held on the same day as the 2024 European Parliament election in Germany.

== Results ==
The Alternative for Germany (AfD) placed first, followed by the Christian Democratic Union (CDU) and Social Democratic Party (SPD). The election marked the first time the AfD had placed first in local elections in Brandenburg. Die Linke experienced the largest decline in both votes and seats, achieving its highest share of the vote in Frankfurt an der Oder. The Social Democratic Party also experienced a modest decline in support, and was strongest in the cities of Cottbus and Potsdam. The election also marked the first time that both Volt Germany and the Third Way won district council seats. The newly-formed Sahra Wagenknecht Alliance (BSW) opted not to participate in the elections, although party leader Sahra Wagenknecht claimed that several BSW members were standing for election as members of local voters' associations.

Summary of results for the 2024 Brandenburg local elections
Party	Votes (Overall)	%	+/-	Seats	+/-
Alternative for Germany (AfD)	1,051,634	25.74	▲9.84	248	▲95
Christian Democratic Union (CDU)	787,192	19.27	▲1.01	184	▲6
Social Democratic Party (SPD)	677,391	16.58	▼1.09	153	▼11
Die Linke	319,573	7.82	▼6.26	74	▼60
Brandenburg United Civic Movements/Free Voters (BVB/FW)	302,858	7.41	▲1.09	67	▲7
Local voters' associations	277,554	6.79	▲2.60	65	▲24
The Greens (Grüne)	272,691	6.67	▼4.39	59	▼39
Farmers' associations	145,996	3.57	▲0.06	36	▲1
Free Democratic Party (FDP)	132,529	3.24	▼1.70	29	▼17
Die PARTEI	39,472	0.97	▲0.43	7	▲2
Independents	22,452	0.55	– (Note: Data for previous elections combines independents with local voters' associations)	4	– (Note: Data for previous elections combines independents with local voters' associations)
Animal Protection Party	21,553	0.53	▲0.42	4	▲3
Pirate Party Germany	20,639	0.51	▲0.03	4	0
The Homeland	6,207	0.15	▼0.42	2	▼3
Volt Germany	5,503	0.13	New	1	New
Third Way	2,449	0.06	New	1	New
Total	4,085,693 (Note: Local elections in Brandenburg use a panachage cumulative voting system, meaning that the total number of votes can be up to three times the number of voters)			938	0
Voter turnout	1,406,103	66.03	▲7.61		
Eligible voters	2,129,602				
