= Dastagird =

Ancient Sasanian city

Map of Asoristan and its surrounding provinces

Dastagird (also spelled as Dastgerd, Dastigird and Daskara), was an ancient Sasanian city in present-day Iraq, and was close to its capital, Ctesiphon.

Originally known as Artemita, the city was rebuilt and renamed by king Hormizd I (r. 270-271). During the reign of king Khosrow I (r. 531-579), the city greatly expanded and had its own court, palace and fortress. During this period, the city also got a secondary name, Khosrow-shad-Kavadh. During the reign of the latter's grandson, Khosrow II (r. 590-628), Dastagird became a royal residence of the Sasanians. In 628, Dastagird was sacked by the Byzantine emperor Heraclius. After that, the city completely disappears from sources.

== Sources ==
- Fisher, William Bayne; Yarshater, Ehsan (1983). The Cambridge History of Iran: The Seleucid, Parthian and Sasanian periods. Cambridge University Press. ISBN 978-0-521-24693-4.
- Pourshariati, Parvaneh (2008). Decline and Fall of the Sasanian Empire: The Sasanian-Parthian Confederacy and the Arab Conquest of Iran. London and New York: I.B. Tauris. ISBN 978-1-84511-645-3.
- Howard-Johnston, James (2010). "ḴOSROW II". Encyclopaedia Iranica, Online Edition.
- Kaegi, Walter Emil (2003), Heraclius: Emperor of Byzantium, Cambridge University Press, ISBN 0-521-81459-6.
