= Werneuchen =

- Town
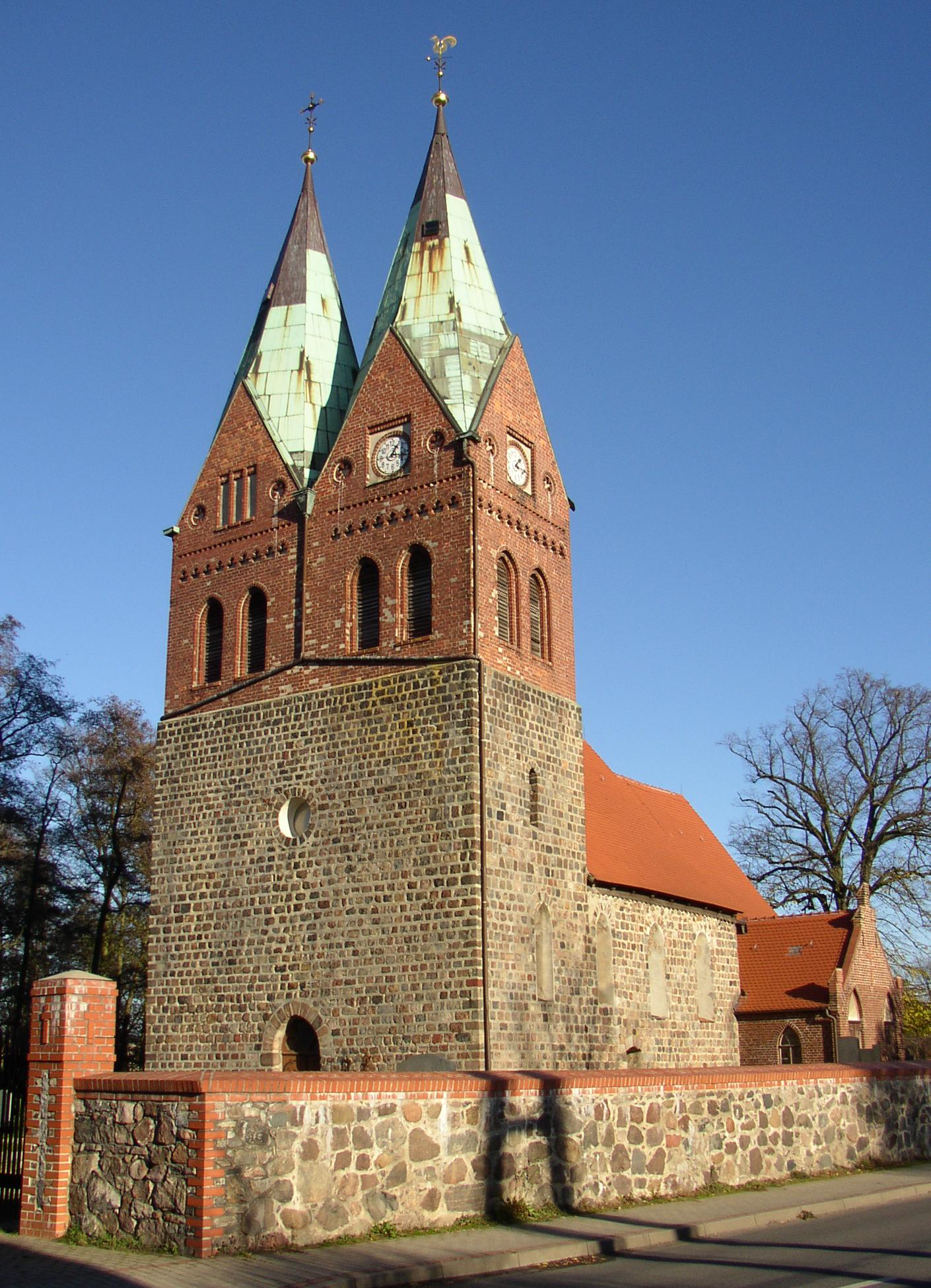
- Church in Willmersdorf

- Flag Coat of arms

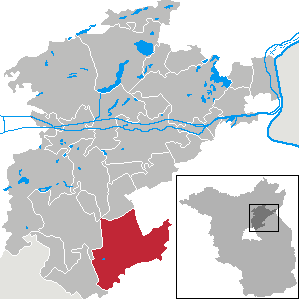
- Location of Werneuchen within Barnim district
- Interactive map of Werneuchen
- Location within Germany Location within Brandenburg
- Coordinates: 52°38′N 13°44′E
- Country: Germany
- State: Brandenburg
- District: Barnim
- Subdivisions: 9 Ortsteile

Government
  - Mayor (2019–27): Frank Kulicke (Ind.)

Area
  - Total: 117.01 km^{2} (45.18 sq mi)
- Elevation: 75 m (246 ft)

Population (2025-12-31)
  - Total: 9,430
  - Density: 80.6/km^{2} (209/sq mi)
- Time zone: UTC+01:00 (CET)
  - Summer (DST): UTC+02:00 (CEST)
- Postal codes: 16356
- Dialling codes: 033398
- Vehicle registration: BAR
- Website: www.stadt-werneuchen.de

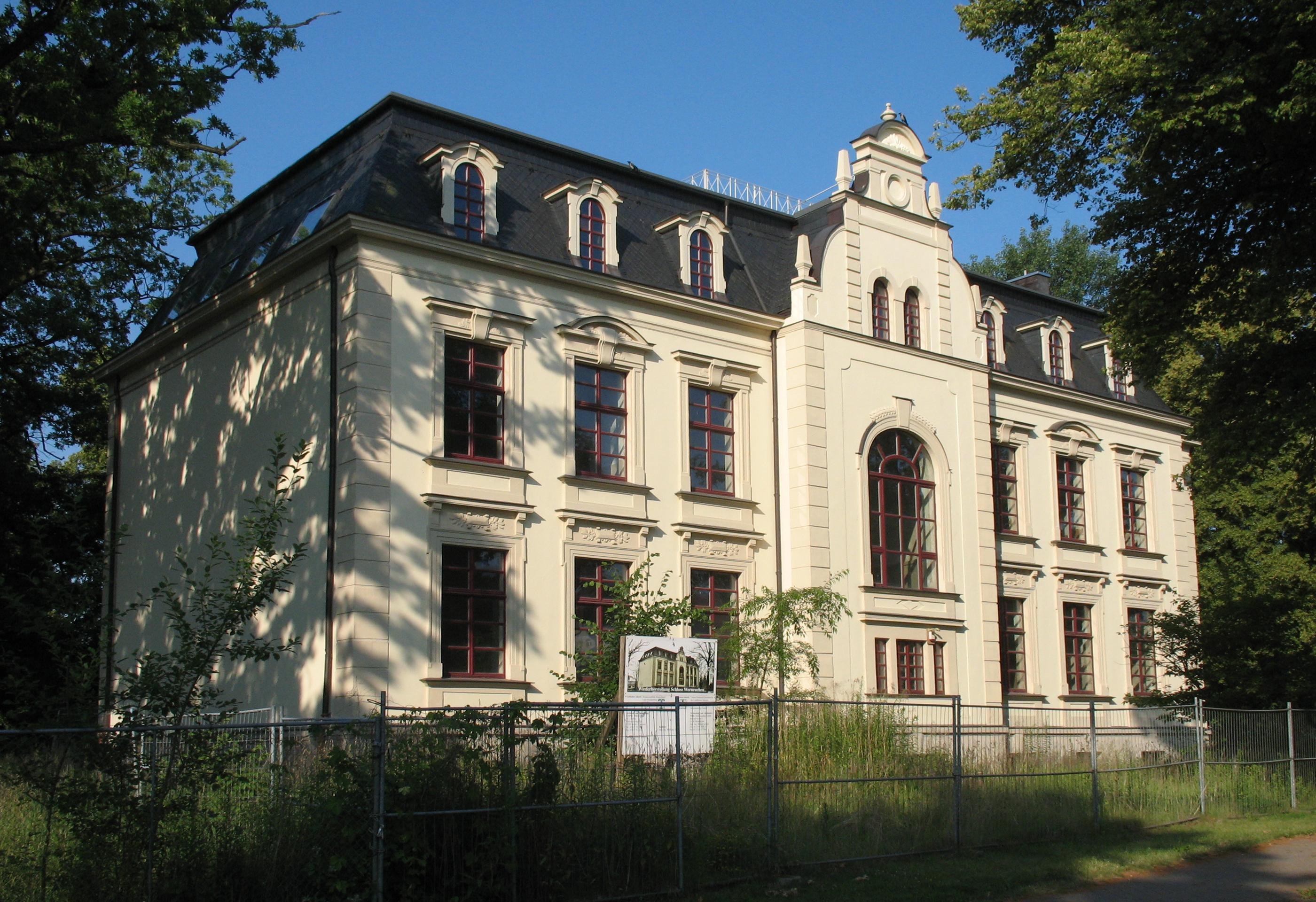
Manor house

Werneuchen (German pronunciation: [vɛɐ̯ˈnɔʏçn̩]) is a town in Brandenburg, Germany, in the district of Barnim northeast of Berlin within the metropolitan area. Most of the population of Werneuchen commutes to Berlin.

== History ==
From 1815 to 1947, Werneuchen was part of the Prussian Province of Brandenburg, from 1947 to 1952 of the State of Brandenburg, from 1952 to 1990 of the East German Bezirk Frankfurt and since 1990 again of Brandenburg.

== Demography ==
Development of population since 1875 within the current boundaries (blue line: population; dotted line: comparison to population development of Brandenburg state; grey background: time of Nazi rule; red background: time of communist rule)

Recent population development and projections (population development before 2011 census (blue line); recent population development according to the Census in Germany in 2011 and 2022 (blue bordered line); official projection for 2024–2040 in three variants (dotted lines 2025–2040)

Werneuchen: Population development
within the current boundaries (2025)

Year	Pop.	±% p.a.
1875	3,997	—
1890	4,433	+0.69%
1910	5,200	+0.80%
1925	5,574	+0.46%
1933	6,029	+0.99%
1939	7,224	+3.06%
1946	7,722	+0.96%

Year	Pop.	±% p.a.
1950	8,248	+1.66%
1964	7,292	−0.88%
1971	7,733	+0.84%
1981	7,081	−0.88%
1985	6,920	−0.57%
1990	6,376	−1.62%
1995	6,413	+0.12%

Year	Pop.	±% p.a.
2000	7,152	+2.21%
2005	7,799	+1.75%
2010	7,920	+0.31%
2015	8,321	+0.99%
2020	9,226	+2.09%
2025	9,430	+0.44%

== International relations ==
Werneuchen is twinned with:

- Dziwnów, Poland
