= Rhahzadh =

7th-century Sasanian general

Roch Vehan
- Born: Armenia, Sasanian Empire
- Died: 12 December 627; Nineveh
- Military career
- Allegiance: Sasanian Empire
- Branch: Sasanian army
- Rank: Spahbed
- Conflicts: Byzantine–Sasanian War of 602–628: Battle of Nineveh (627) †

Rhahzadh (Middle Persian: Rāhzād), originally Roch Vehan (from Rōzbehān, "son of Rōzbeh"), known in Byzantine sources as Rhazates (Ancient Greek: Ῥαζάτης) was a Sasanian general of Armenian origin under Shah Khosrow II (r. 590–628).

== Biography ==
As the war that had begun in 602 between the Sasanian Empire and the Byzantine Empire came close to its twenty-fifth year, the Byzantine Emperor Heraclius (r. 610–641) made a bold move. As the campaigning season of 627 ended, Heraclius gathered his heterogeneous army of Göktürks and Byzantines, and invaded the Persian heartland at the beginning of September. The news threw Khosrau into a panic. After fifteen years of war, his army was exhausted and his two foremost generals were not available; Shahin was dead and Shahrbaraz was away in Egypt, fearing that Khosrau wanted him dead. Consequently, Khosrau gathered an army and appointed as its commander Rhahzadh, a warlike and brave nobleman.

Rhahzadh moved to cut off Heraclius and prevent him from reaching Ctesiphon, the Persian capital. Heraclius continued burning and pillaging as he went, Rhahzadh following Heraclius, biding his time until he was ready to meet the Romans. Finally Heraclius crossed the Great Zab River and set up camp preventing Rhahzadh from crossing by the same bridge without forcing battle. Instead he moved down and forded further downstream. When Heraclius heard of this he detached part of his army under Baanes to harass Rhahzadh. In the ensuing skirmish the Romans killed and captured many Persians, including Rhahzadh's personal aide. From him Heraclius learned that Rhahzadh was awaiting some 3000 reinforcements. Heraclius became concerned when he heard of this: his army was severely depleted by the desertion of the Turkic contingent and was concerned that Rhahzadh's reinforcements could tip the scale.

So on 12 December 627, near Nineveh, Heraclius drew up his army on a plain and waited for Rhahzadh. Rhahzadh saw this and moved to meet the Byzantines. He drew up his army in three divisions similar to phalanxes, and advanced towards Heraclius. At the height of the battle Rhahzadh suddenly challenged Heraclius to single combat with the hope of forcing the Romans to flee. Heraclius accepted the challenge and spurred his horse forward and with a single blow struck off Rhahzadh's head, taking from the dead Persian his shield of 120 gold plates and gold breastplate as trophies. With Rhahzadh's death perished the Persians' hopes of victory: seeing their brave commander and many other high-ranking officers being slain by Heraclius and his household troops, the Persian troops lost heart and were slaughtered suffering around 6,000 casualties.

Other historians doubt the numbers were that high or that Rhahzadh squared off against Heraclius in single combat, believing it to be exaggerated for romanticism.

== Sources ==
- Kaegi, Walter Emil (2003), Heraclius: emperor of Byzantium, Cambridge University Press, ISBN 0-521-81459-6
