= Ahrensfelde =

- Municipality
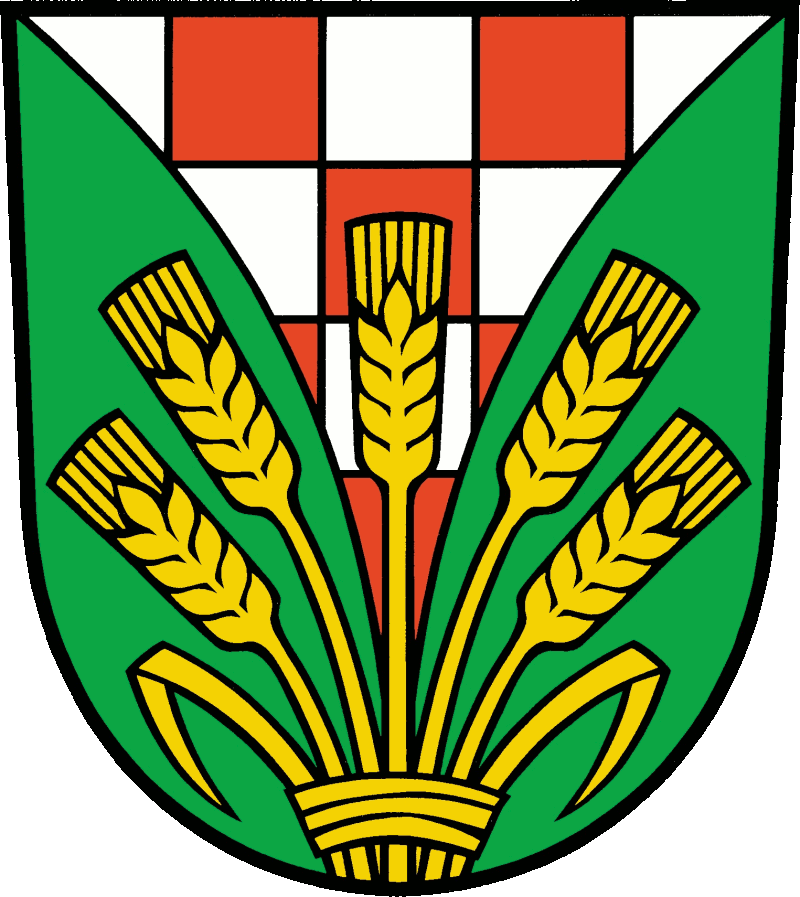
- Coat of arms

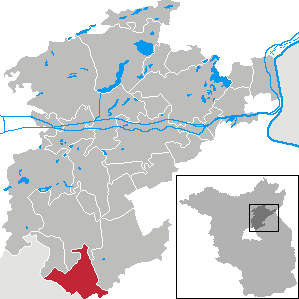
- Location of Ahrensfelde within Barnim district
- Interactive map of Ahrensfelde
- Location within Germany Location within Brandenburg
- Coordinates: 52°34′33″N 13°34′35″E
- Country: Germany
- State: Brandenburg
- District: Barnim
- Subdivisions: 5 Ortsteile

Government
  - Mayor (2019–27): Wilfried Gehrke (CDU)

Area
  - Total: 57.94 km^{2} (22.37 sq mi)
- Elevation: 56–85 m (184–279 ft)

Population (2025-12-31)
  - Total: 14,464
  - Density: 249.6/km^{2} (646.6/sq mi)
- Time zone: UTC+01:00 (CET)
  - Summer (DST): UTC+02:00 (CEST)
- Postal codes: 16356
- Dialling codes: 030
- Vehicle registration: BAR
- Website: www.ahrensfelde.de

Ahrensfelde (German pronunciation: [aːʁənsˈfɛldə]) is a municipality in the district of Barnim, in Brandenburg, Germany. It is situated on the Barnim Plateau at the city limits of Berlin, about 13 km (8.1 mi) northeast of the city centre. The municipal area comprises the villages of Ahrensfelde, Blumberg, Eiche, Lindenberg, and Mehrow.

== History ==
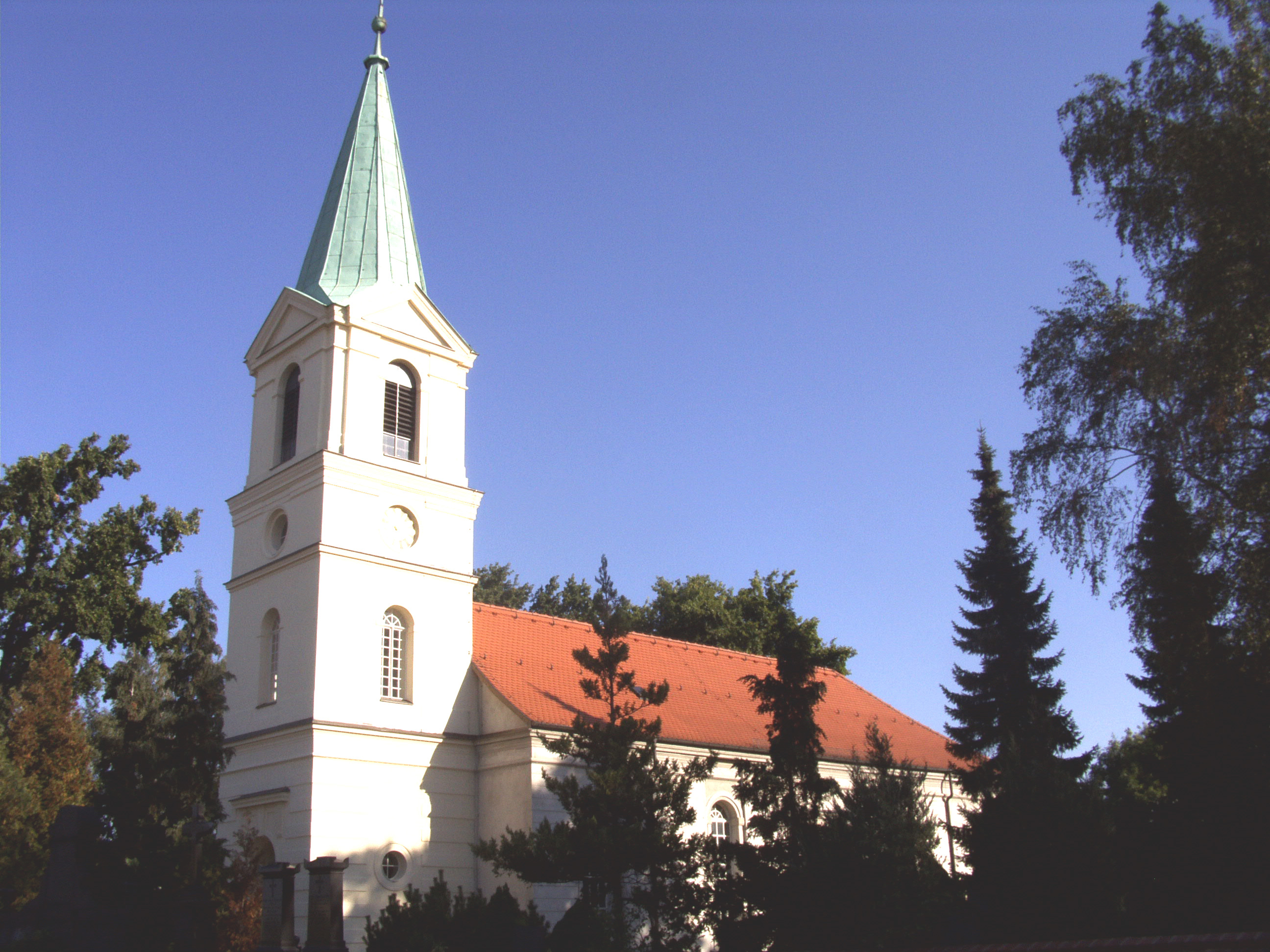
Ahrensfelde parish church

Ahrensfelde, like the neighbouring village of Eiche, was first mentioned in the 1375 Landbuch (domesday book) survey executed for Emperor Charles IV, after he had acquired the Margraviate of Brandenburg two years before. The oldest village however is Blumberg, once a possession held by the Bishops of Brandenburg, which was first mentioned as Blumenberch in 1253. Blumberg manor was acquired by the poet and diplomat Friedrich von Canitz in the late 17th century, the castle was later rebuilt according to plans by Karl Friedrich Schinkel with a park designed by Peter Joseph Lenné. It was destroyed by the advancing Red Army during the 1945 Battle of Berlin. The art historian Adolf Bötticher was a native of Blumberg.

From 1815 to 1947, Ahrensfelde was part of the Prussian Province of Brandenburg, from 1947 to 1952 of the State of Brandenburg, from 1952 to 1990 of the East German Bezirk Frankfurt and since 1990 again of Brandenburg.

In 1908 the Ahrensfelde Cemetery was established by the Evangelical Church of the Prussian Union as a multi-regional burial site outside of Berlin. Parts of the municipal area near Ahrensfelde station were overbuilt and finally incorporated into the East Berlin borough of Marzahn in 1990. The present-day municipality was established by the merger of Ahrensfelde proper with Blumberg, Eiche and Lindeberg on 26 October 2003.

== Demography ==
Development of Population since 1875 within the Current Boundaries (Blue Line: Population; Dotted Line: Comparison to Population Development of Brandenburg state; Grey Background: Time of Nazi rule; Red Background: Time of Communist rule)

Recent Population Development and Projections (Population Development before Census 2011 (blue line); Recent Population Development according to the Census in Germany in 2011 (blue bordered line); Official projections for 2005-2030 (yellow line); for 2014-2030 (red line); for 2017-2030 (scarlet line)

Ahrensfelde: Population development
within the current boundaries (2020)

Year	Pop.	±% p.a.
1875	2,766	—
1890	3,130	+0.83%
1910	3,320	+0.30%
1925	3,477	+0.31%
1933	5,041	+4.75%
1939	6,766	+5.03%
1946	7,055	+0.60%

Year	Pop.	±% p.a.
1950	7,711	+2.25%
1964	7,178	−0.51%
1971	6,918	−0.53%
1981	5,674	−1.96%
1985	5,438	−1.06%
1990	5,036	−1.52%
1995	6,494	+5.22%

Year	Pop.	±% p.a.
2000	10,612	+10.32%
2005	12,848	+3.90%
2010	13,028	+0.28%
2015	12,954	−0.11%
2020	13,959	+1.51%
2025	14,464	+0.71%

== Education ==
There are 3 schools in the Ahrensfelde municipality, with no post-secondary education institutions.

- Lindenberg Primary School
- Bloomberg Primary and Secondary School
- Docemus Campus Bloomberg

== Infrastructure ==
=== Rail and Bus ===
Ahrensfelde municipality is a part of the Verkehrsverbund Berlin-Brandenburg (VBB) public transportation network.

Liniennetz Ahrensfelde is a municipal bus and railway system with 9 bus and 3 railway routes.

== Politics ==
Seats in the municipal assembly (Gemeindevertretung) as of the 2024 local election:

- Alternative for Germany: 5
- Ahrensfelde Voters Association: 4
- Christian Democratic Union: 3
- Social Democratic Party of Germany: 2
- "Citizens' Association Eiche": 2
- Citizens for Ahrensfelde: 2
- Free Voters (Ahrensfelde): 2
- The Left: 1
- Alliance 90/The Greens: 1
