= Werneuchen station =

Railway station in Werneuchen, Germany

Werneuchen
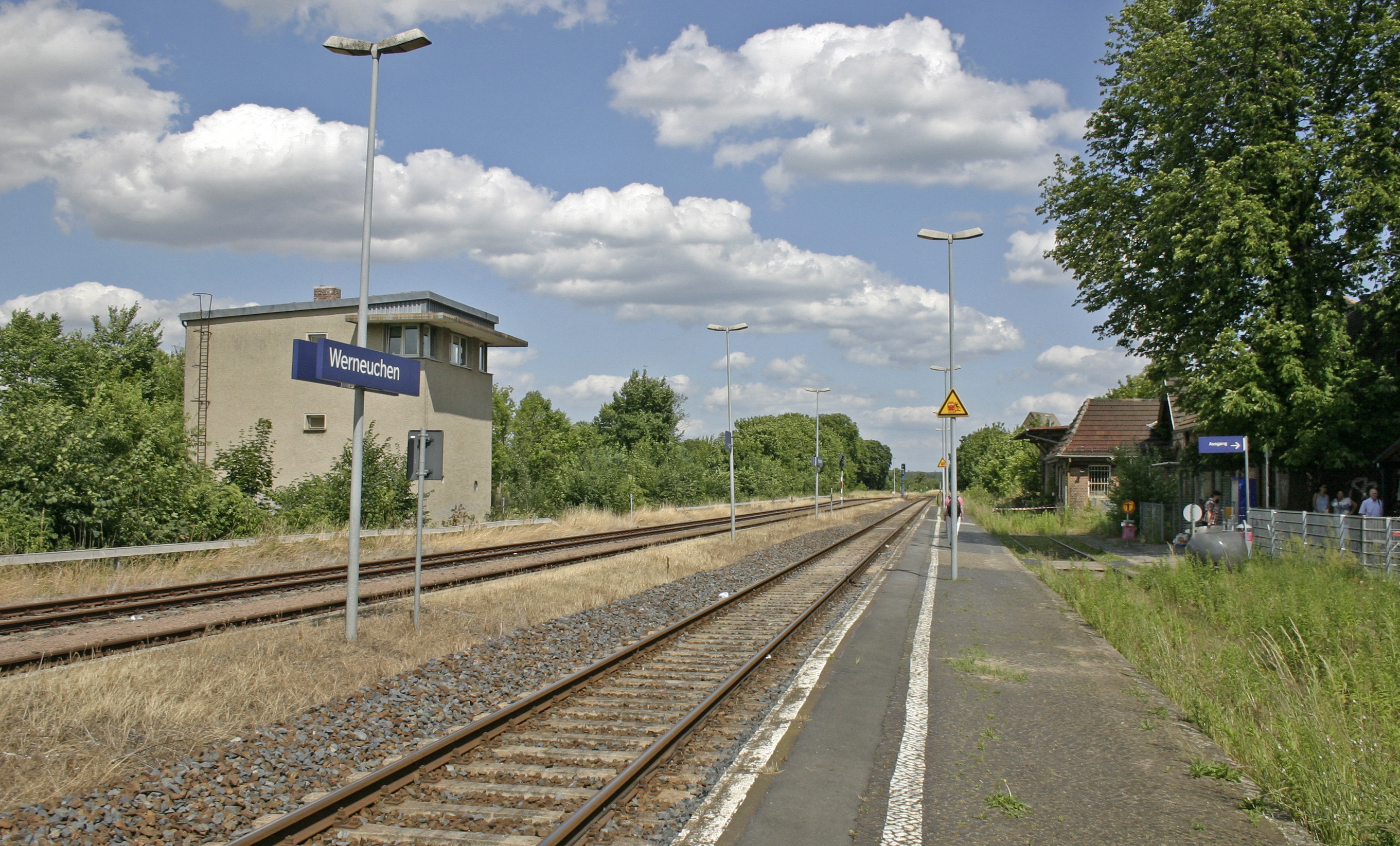
- 2015

General information
- Location: Am Bahnhof 3; 16356 Werneuchen; Brandenburg; Germany
- Coordinates: 52.6373°N 13.7385°E
- Owner: DB Netz
- Operator: DB Station&Service
- Line: Wriezen Railway
- Platforms: 2 side platforms
- Tracks: 3
- Train operators: Niederbarnimer Eisenbahn

Other information
- Station code: 6690
- DS100 code: BWER
- IBNR: 8013285
- Category: 6
- Fare zone: : Berlin C/5261
- Website: www.bahnhof.de

History
- Opened: 1 May 1898; 128 years ago

Services
Preceding station	Niederbarnimer Eisenbahn	Following station
Seefeld (Mark) towards Berlin Ostkreuz	RB 25	Terminus
Location
- Location within Brandenburg

Werneuchen station is a railway station in the municipality of Werneuchen, located in the Barnim district in Brandenburg, Germany. It is served by the Regionalbahn service RB 25 of the Niederbarnimer Eisenbahn to Berlin and is its terminal station.
