= Marzahn =

- Quarter of Berlin
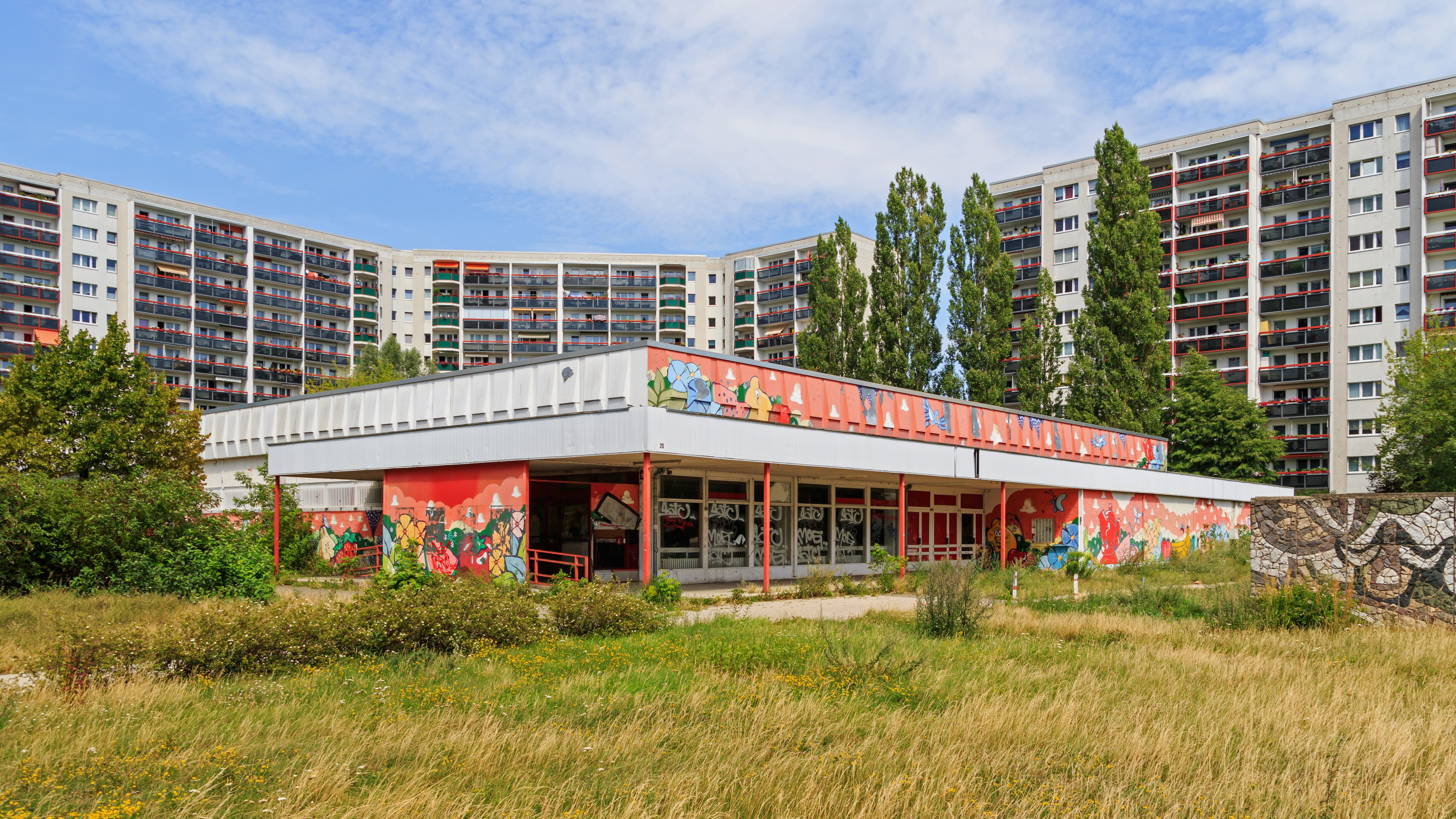
- Bärensteinstraße: plattenbau apartment houses and an abandoned former Konsum retail building

- Coat of arms

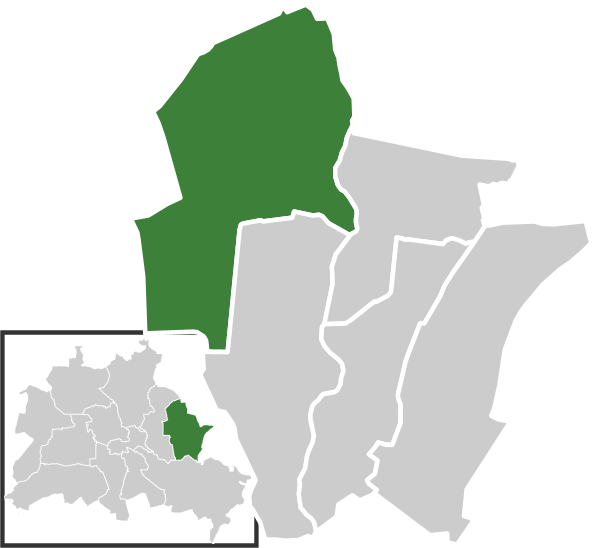
- Location of Marzahn in Marzahn-Hellersdorf and Berlin
- Interactive map of Marzahn
- Location within Germany Location within Berlin
- Coordinates: 52°33′00″N 13°33′00″E
- Country: Germany
- State: Berlin
- City: Berlin
- Borough: Marzahn-Hellersdorf
- Founded: 1300
- Subdivisions: 3 zones

Area
  - Total: 19.5 km^{2} (7.5 sq mi)
- Elevation: 112 m (367 ft)

Population (2024-12-31)
  - Total: 119,584
  - Density: 6,130/km^{2} (15,900/sq mi)
- Time zone: UTC+01:00 (CET)
  - Summer (DST): UTC+02:00 (CEST)
- Postal codes: 12671, 12679, 12681, 12685, 12687, 12689
- Vehicle registration: B

Marzahn (German pronunciation: [maʁˈtsaːn]) is a locality within the borough of Marzahn-Hellersdorf in Berlin. Berlin's 2001 administrative reform led to the former boroughs of Marzahn and Hellersdorf fusing into a single new borough. In the north the Marzahn locality includes the neighbourhoods of Bürknersfelde and Ahrensfelde, an overbuilt strip of land which once had belonged to the Brandenburg municipality of Ahrensfelde and was incorporated into Berlin in 1990.

== Geography ==
=== Subdivision ===
Marzahn is divided into three zones (Ortslagen):

- Marzahn-Nord (Berlin-Ahrensfelde)
- Marzahn-Mitte
- Marzahn-Süd

== History ==
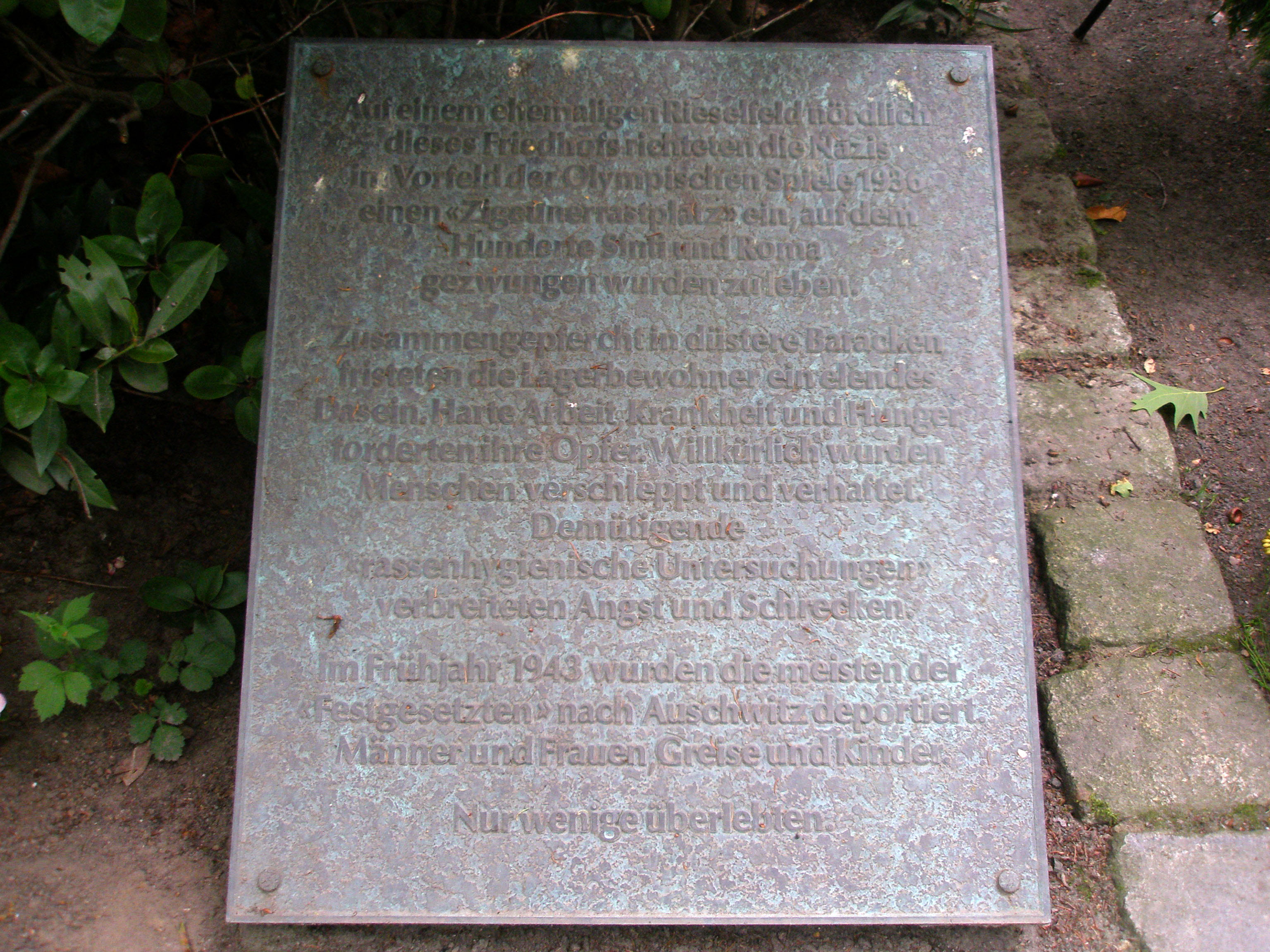
Inscription on a plate next to the memorial stone on the Marzahn cemetery: "On a former sewage field North of the cemetery, the Nazis set up a so called "Zigeunerrastplatz" (gypsies' resting place) in advance of the 1936 Olympic Games, on which hundreds of Sinti and Roma were forced to live. Crowded into dark shacks, the inhabitants of the camp survived with difficulty. Hard labour, sickness and hunger claimed their victims. At random people were abducted and arrested. Humiliating "racial hygiene" examinations spread fear and terror. In the spring of 1943 most of the "detained people" were deported to Auschwitz. Men and women, seniors and children. Only a few survived."

The historic village of Marzahn was first mentioned as Morczane in a 1300 deed by Margrave Albert III of Brandenburg-Salzwedel, when he granted the estates to the Friedland Cistercian abbey (in today's Neuhardenberg). After the Thirty Years' War it fell to Elector Frederick William of Brandenburg. The new village church was finished in 1871 according to plans by Friedrich August Stüler, another landmark is the Marzahn post mill, rebuilt in 1994. The village became part of Greater Berlin in 1920, as a locality of the Lichtenberg district.

Marzahn was the site of a labour camp (today a water treatment plant), where Romani were interned during the 1936 Summer Olympics in Berlin, away from visitors' eyes. As a part of the Nazi Porajmos extermination policy, up to 2000 inmates remained there until 1943, when they were deported to Auschwitz-Birkenau, where most of them were gassed. In 1941 the large factory of the Carl Hasse & Wrede machine tool company (now Knorr-Bremse) was erected, where hundreds of forced labourers were employed. The victims were buried at the nearby Parkfriedhof; a memorial marks the site.

On 21 April 1945, during the opening phase of the Battle of Berlin, the city's eastern district of Marzahn was the first in Berlin to be conquered by the Soviet Red Army under General Nikolai Berzarin's command. A single-storey building (Landsberger Allee 563), apparently the "first freed house", still stands today on Landsberger Allee as a memorial to the Soviet victory after the battle.

A part of East Berlin from 1949, Marzahn remained a rural site until 1977 when vast housing estates were built on its fields by order of the East German authorities. The construction, carried out in the typical plattenbau prefabricated-building style, dragged on until the late 1980s. In the course of the considerable population growth Marzahn was separated from Lichtenberg in 1979 to become a borough in its own right and in 1986 the new Hellersdorf district (including Kaulsdorf and Mahlsdorf) was split from it.

In 1987, Marzahn hosted the Berliner Gartenschau, a horticulture show, on the occasion of Berlin's 750th anniversary. The area today called Erholungspark Marzahn includes the Gärten der Welt (Gardens of the World) project, showing Chinese, Japanese, Balinese, and Korean labyrinths modelled on Hampton Court Palace and Chartres Cathedral, as well as a garden of the Italian Renaissance.

After 1989 (as the Berlin Wall fell and Germany reunified), the Marzahn estate became known for being a place synonymous with neo-Nazis and their activities and "foreigners were warned not even to visit there", despite the area having a significant Russian and Vietnamese community.

== Public transport ==
Marzahn is served by the S-Bahn lines S7 and S75 at the stations Springpfuhl, Poelchaustraße, Marzahn, Raoul-Wallenberg-Straße, Mehrower Allee and Ahrensfelde. Tramway connections to the inner city are provided by the M6 and M8 lines of the Berlin Straßenbahn.

== See also ==
- Berlin-Marzahn concentration camp
- ORWOhaus

== Gallery ==
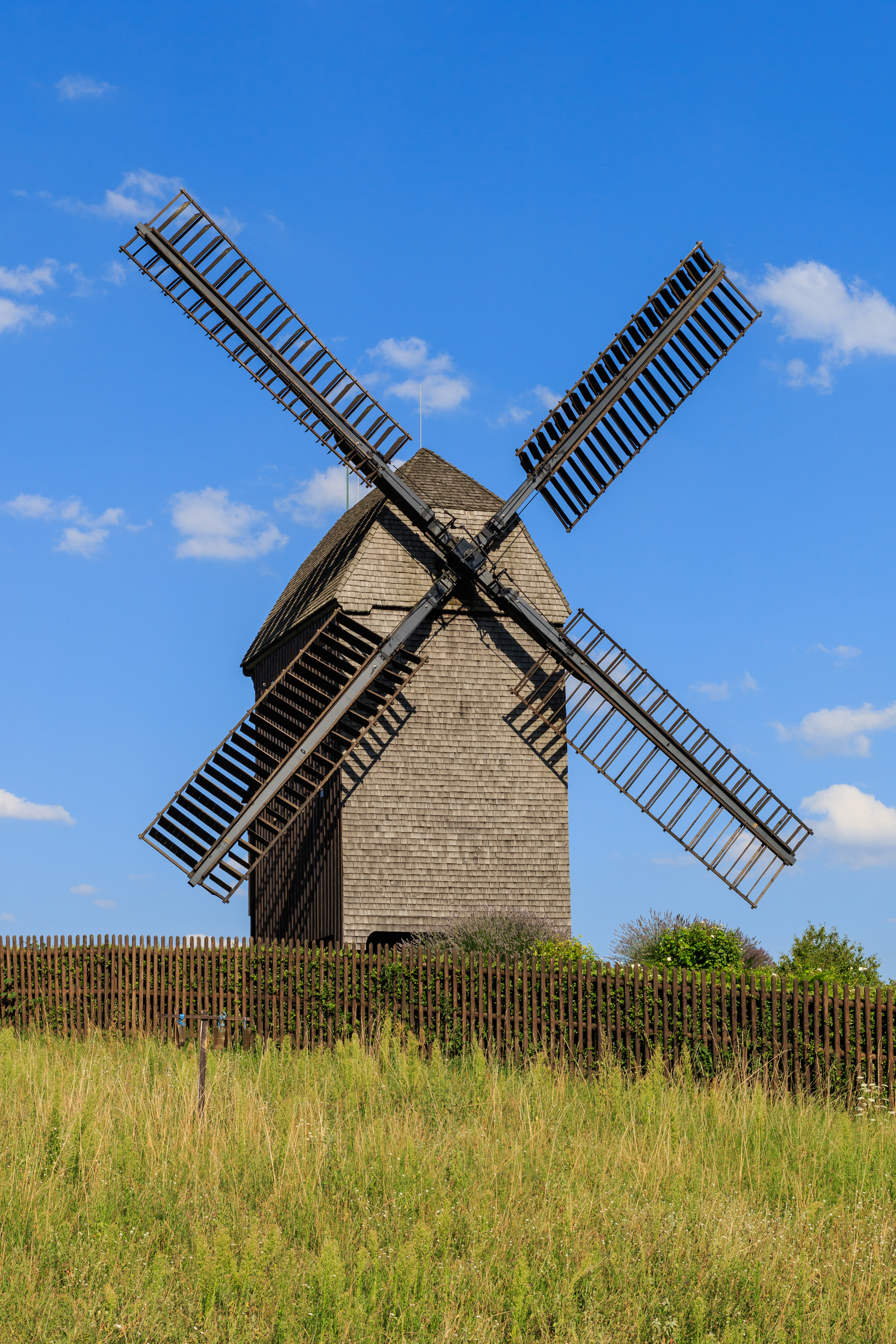
Post mill

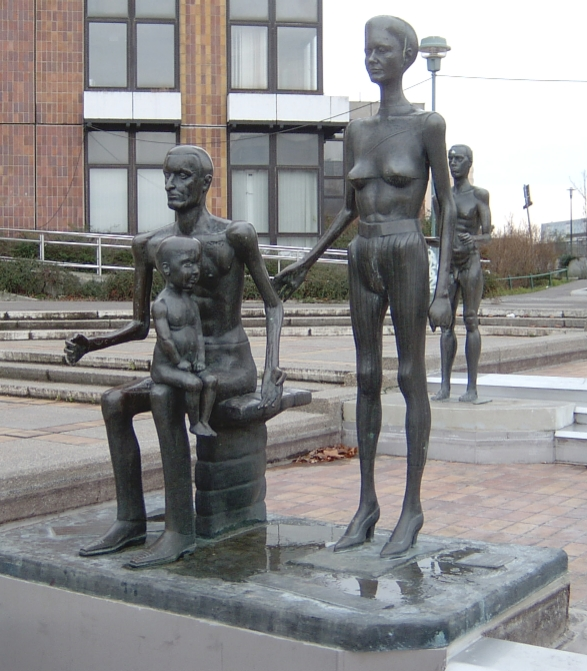
Rolf Biebl fountain

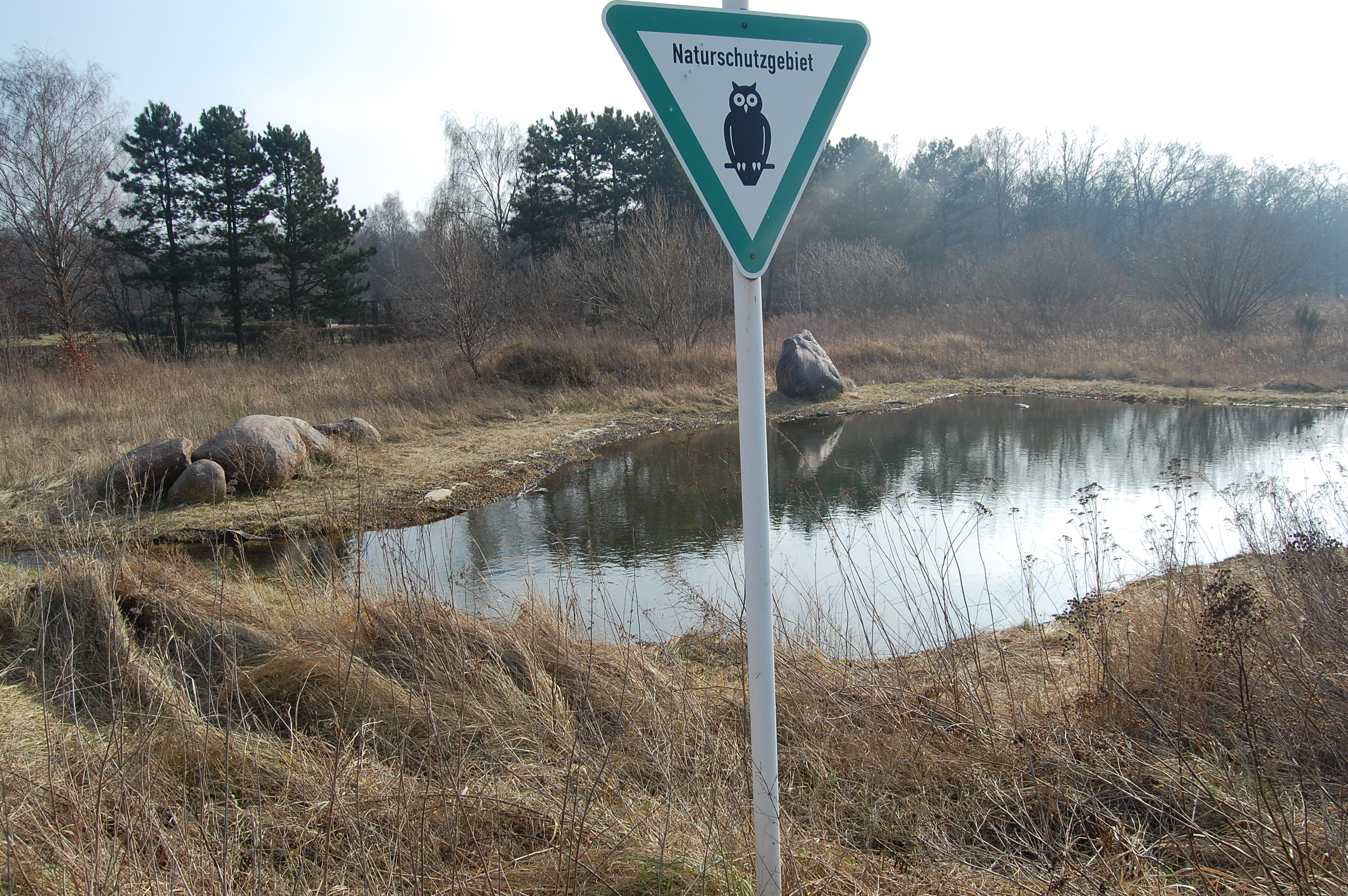
Unkenpfuhle

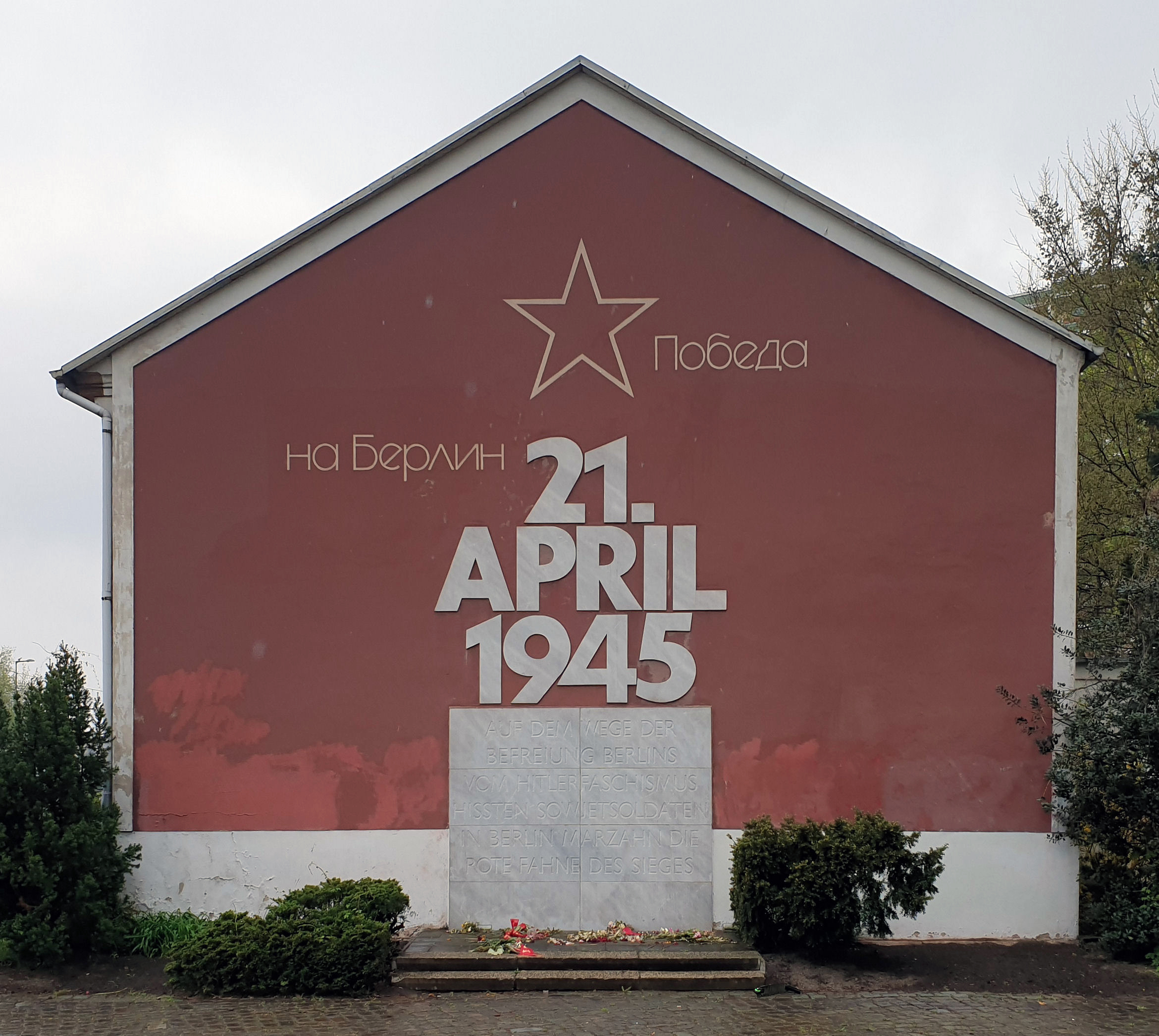
Gedenktafel Landsberger Allee 563 (Marza) 21 April 1945

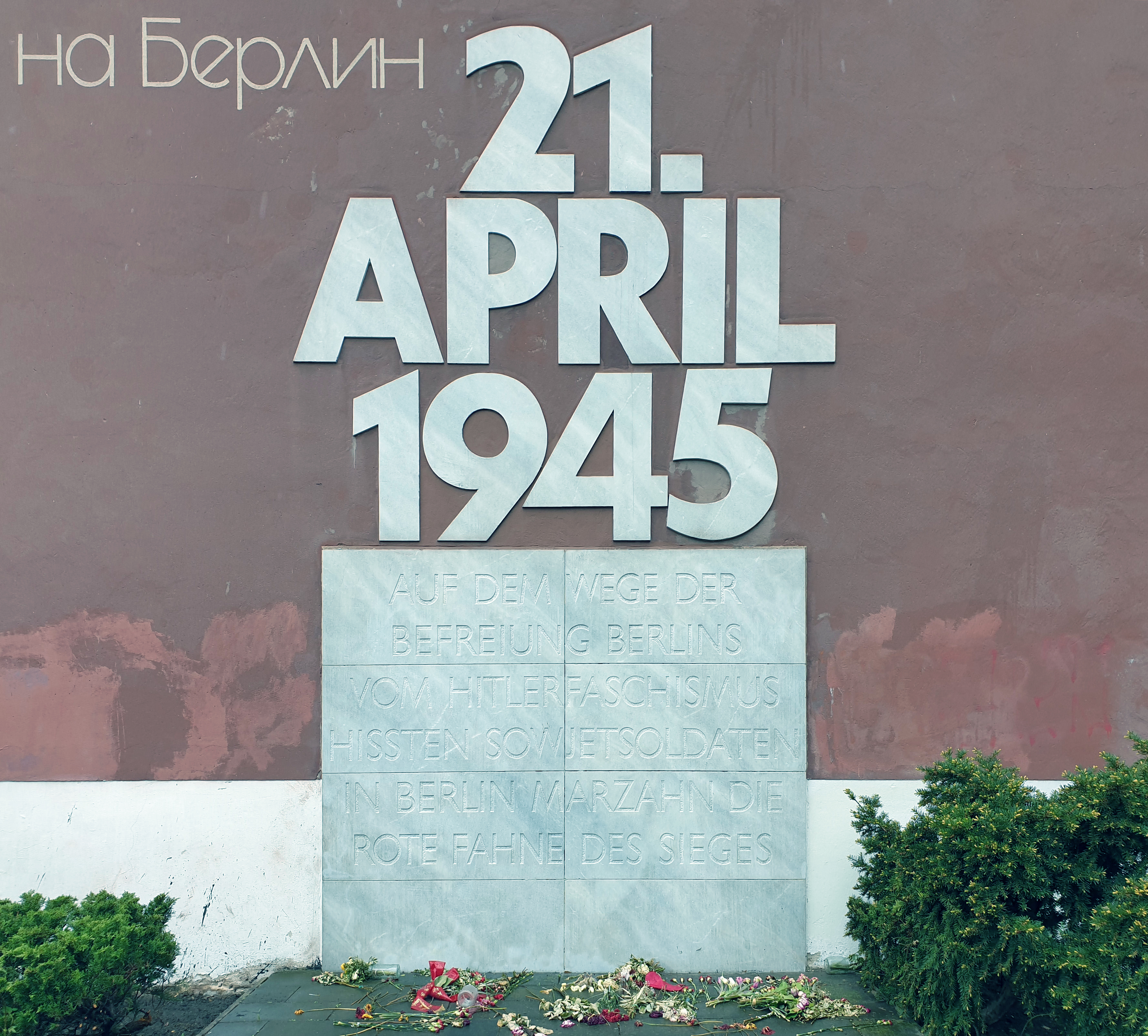
Gedenktafel Landsberger Allee 563 (Marza) 21 April 1945
