= Berlin-Friedrichsfelde Ost station =

Railway station in Berlin, Germany

Coordinates: 52.5141°N 13.5198°E

Friedrichsfelde Ost
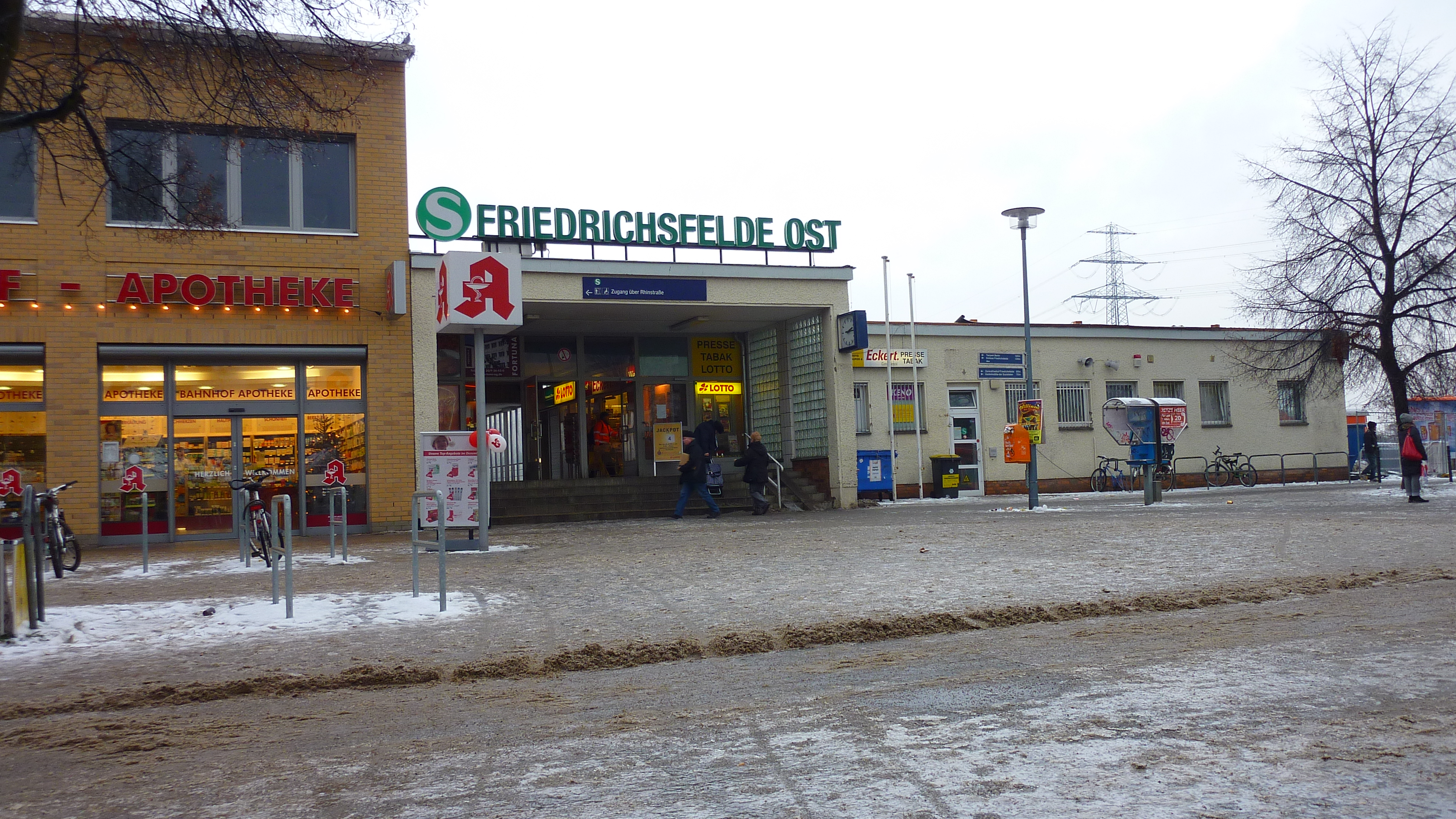
- 2009

General information
- Location: Seddiner Straße 23; 10315 Berlin; Marzahn; Germany
- Owner: DB Netz
- Operator: DB Station&Service
- Lines: Prussian Eastern Railway (KBS 200.5)
- Platforms: 1 island platform
- Tracks: 2
- Train operators: S-Bahn Berlin
- Connections: 192 194

Other information
- Station code: 1944
- DS100 code: BFFO
- IBNR: 8089059
- Category: 4
- Fare zone: : Berlin B/5656
- Website: www.bahnhof.de

History
- Opened: 6 September 1979; 46 years ago

Services
Preceding station	Berlin S-Bahn	Following station
Lichtenberg towards Westkreuz	S5	Biesdorf towards Strausberg Nord
Lichtenberg towards Potsdam Hbf	S7	Springpfuhl towards Ahrensfelde
Lichtenberg towards Warschauer Straße	S75	Springpfuhl towards Wartenberg
Location

Friedrichsfelde Ost is a railway station in the Marzahn district of Berlin. The station is located north of the district border to Friedrichsfelde at the intersection of the route of the Prussian Eastern Railway with the Rhinstraße and is served by three lines of the Berlin S-Bahn.

== Operation ==
The station is served by the S-Bahn lines S5, S7 and S75.
