= Potsdam-Babelsberg station =

Railway station in Potsdam, Germany

Babelsberg
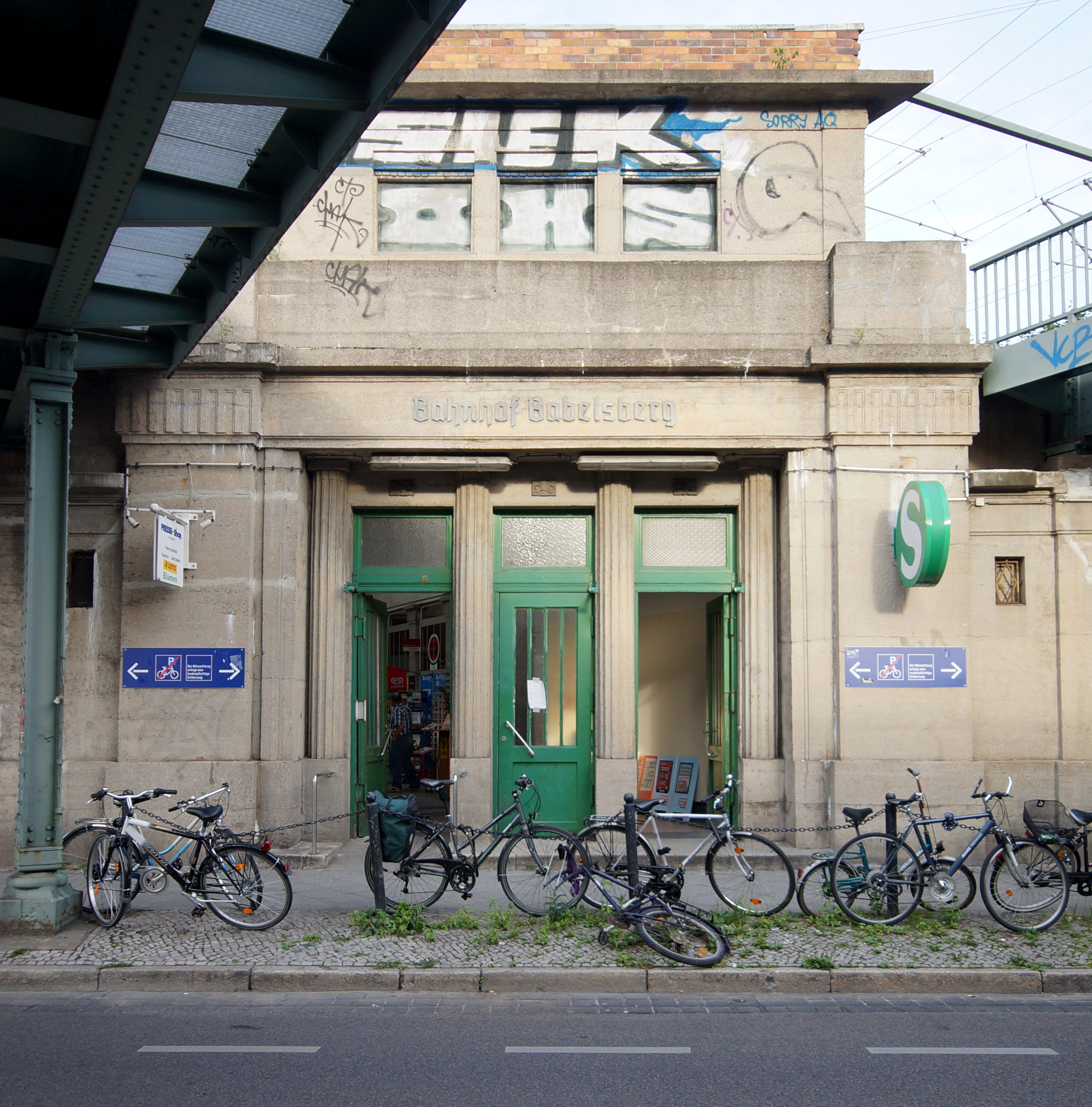
- Western entrance

General information
- Location: Rudolf-Breitscheid-Straße 40, Babelsberg, Potsdam, Brandenburg; Germany
- Coordinates: 52°23′29″N 13°05′34″E
- Owner: Deutsche Bahn
- Operator: DB Netz; DB Station&Service
- Lines: Wannsee Railway (km 31.2) (KBS 200.7)
- Platforms: 2

Construction
- Accessible: Yes

Other information
- Station code: 237
- DS100 code: BBAB
- IBNR: 8080070
- Category: 5
- Fare zone: : Berlin C and Potsdam B/5851
- Website: www.bahnhof.de

History
- Opened: 1862

Services
Preceding station	Berlin S-Bahn	Following station
Potsdam Hbf Terminus	S7	Griebnitzsee towards Ahrensfelde
Location

Potsdam-Babelsberg station is an S-Bahn station in the Potsdam district of Babelsberg. It is located on the tracks of an extension of the Wannsee Railway between Griebnitzsee station and Potsdam Hauptbahnhof. It is classified by Deutsche Bahn as a category 5 station.

== Location ==
The station is located in the Babelsberg district and is surrounded by the streets of Rudolf-Breitscheid- Straße, Karl-Liebknecht-Straße, Schulstraße and Wattstraße. It is located at the kilometre 31.2 on the Wannsee Railway, where it runs parallel to the mainline tracks of the Berlin–Magdeburg railway.

== History ==
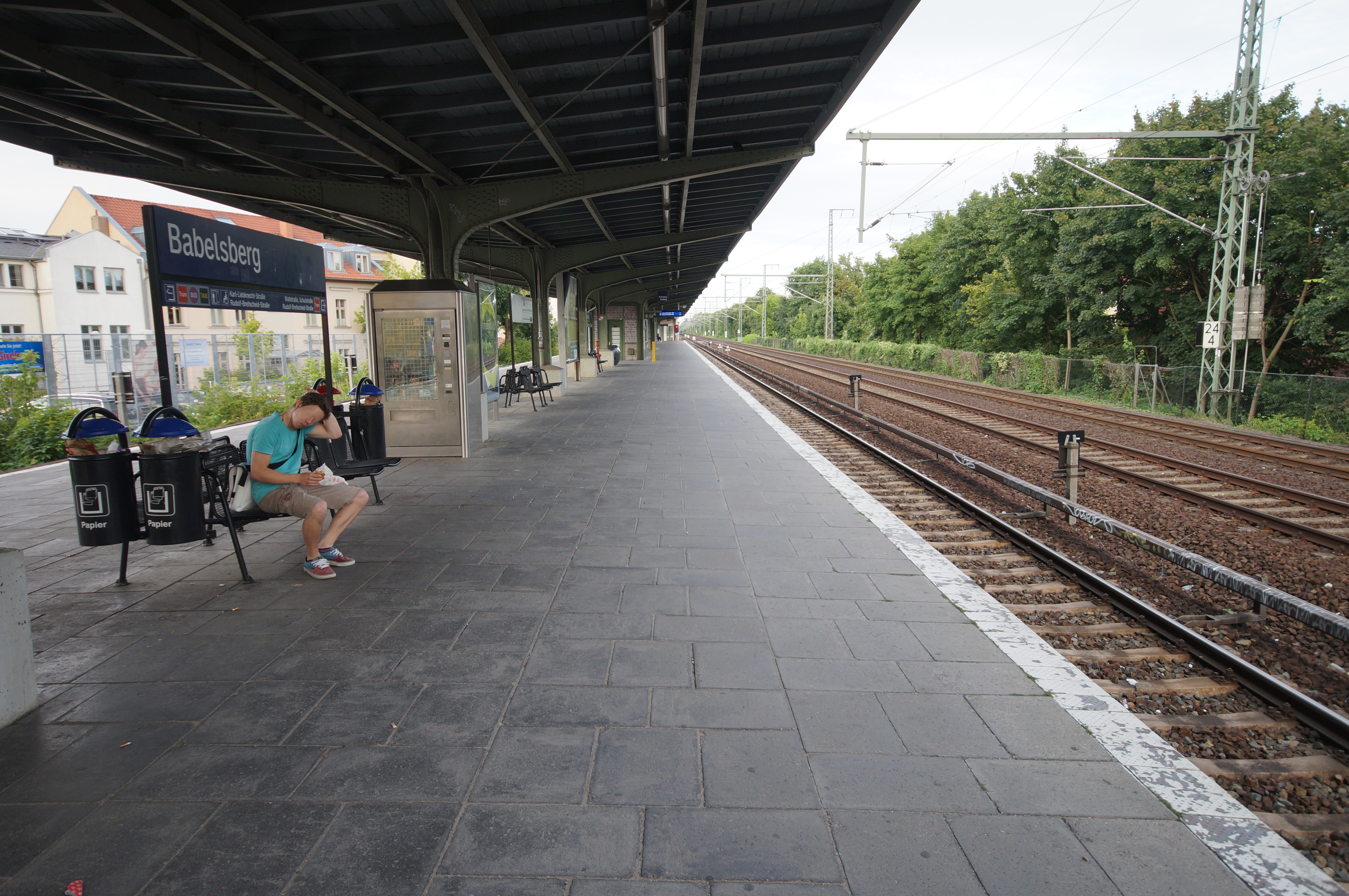
The platform

The first station in Babelsberg was opened on the main line in 1862 under the name of Neuendorf as a special stop for the royal trains of the King of Prussia, William I. It was west of the current station. From 1866/1868, ordinary trains stopped at the station, originally at a side platform; later it was supplemented by a second side platform.

In 1888, the tracks of Wannsee Railway was extended from Neubabelsberg (now Griebnitzsee) to Potsdam, resulting in this section now having four tracks. The old station was closed and a new suburban station opened on the Wannsee Railway in the current position. This was renamed Neuendorf-Nowawes on 1 May 1890 and, on 1 March 1908, it was renamed Nowawes, the Czech translation of the name Neuendorf ("new village"). The track was elevated between 1911 and 1914 and the current station was established.

As of 11 June 1928, the station was served by electric trains of the Berlin Stadtbahn, the Ringbahn and the suburban railways, which have been branded as the S-Bahn since 1 September 1928. The trains continued on the tracks of the Berlin-Blankenheim railway (Wetzlarer Bahn) to the Stadtbahn rather than over the Wannsee Railway. Eight years later, on 1 April 1938, the station was named Babelsberg and, in the same year, the town was incorporated into Potsdam.

The introduction of border controls for inter-zone traffic (between East and West Germany in February 1951 meant that the station was closed for several days.

With the construction of the Berlin Wall on 13 August 1961, the railway line from Potsdam to West Berlin was broken. Until 9 October, the track between Potsdam Stadt (now Potsdam Hauptbahnhof), Babelsberg and Griebnitzsee was operated as an S-Bahn island; it was then operated with diesel railcars. To enable this change of operations, a connecting track was built between the suburban and the long-distance tracks. The trains ran from Griebnitzsee via Babelsberg, Potsdam Stadt, Potsdam West (now Potsdam Charlottenhof) to Potsdam Hauptbahnhof (now Potsdam Pirschheide). On 29 October of the same year, Griebnitzsee station was converted into a station for carrying out border controls only and the diesel service to Babelsberg was withdrawn.

After the re-opening of the border in 1989, a connection from Babelsberg via Griebnitzsee to Berlin-Wannsee was restored on 22 January 1990 using diesel trains. S-bahn services were restored on 1 April 1992. Four years later, an authentic restoration was carried out on the station.

== Infrastructure ==
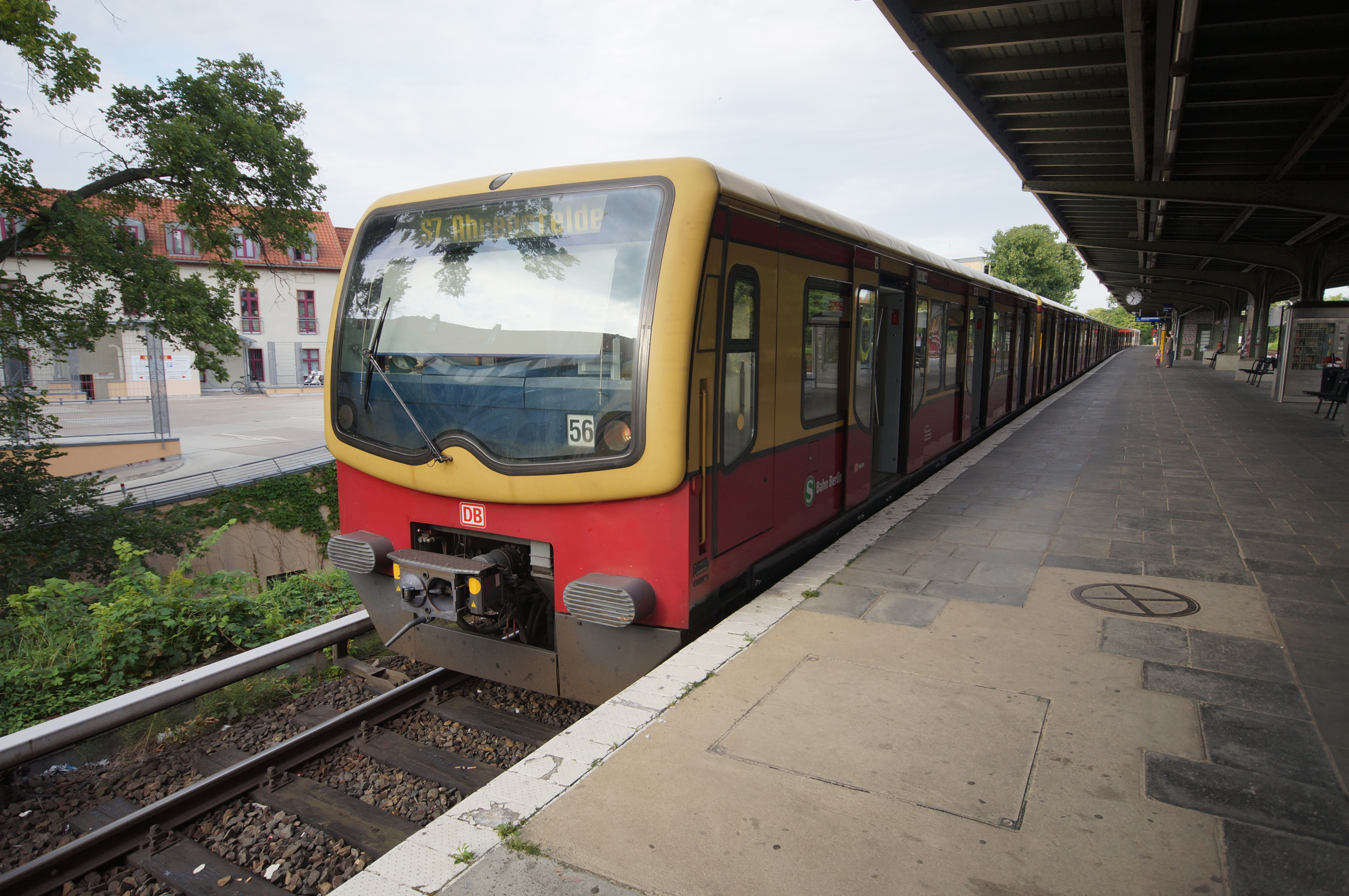
Train of class 481 on S-Bahn line 7 on the way to Ahrensfelde

The station is elevated and consists of a 159-metre-long island platform with two platform tracks on the S-Bahn line, which is otherwise single track in this area. Trains regularly pass each other at the station. The two main line tracks of the Berlin–Magdeburg railway run past to the south of the station. Both platforms are each connected by stairs with skylights to an entrance room, which formerly included ticket offices. Today the premises are used for a restaurant, snack bars and a flower shop. The entrances connect to Karl-Liebknecht-Straße in the west and Wattstraße to the east.

The station is protected as a listed monument.

The station's DS-100 code is BBAB and its station code is 237.

== Passenger services ==
The S-Bahn station is served by line S7 of the Berlin S-Bahn. It is possible to change to the bus and tram lines operated by Verkehrsbetrieb Potsdam.

== See also ==
- List of railway stations in Brandenburg
