= Berlin Springpfuhl station =

German Train Station

Coordinates: 52°31′38″N 13°32′11″E

Springpfuhl
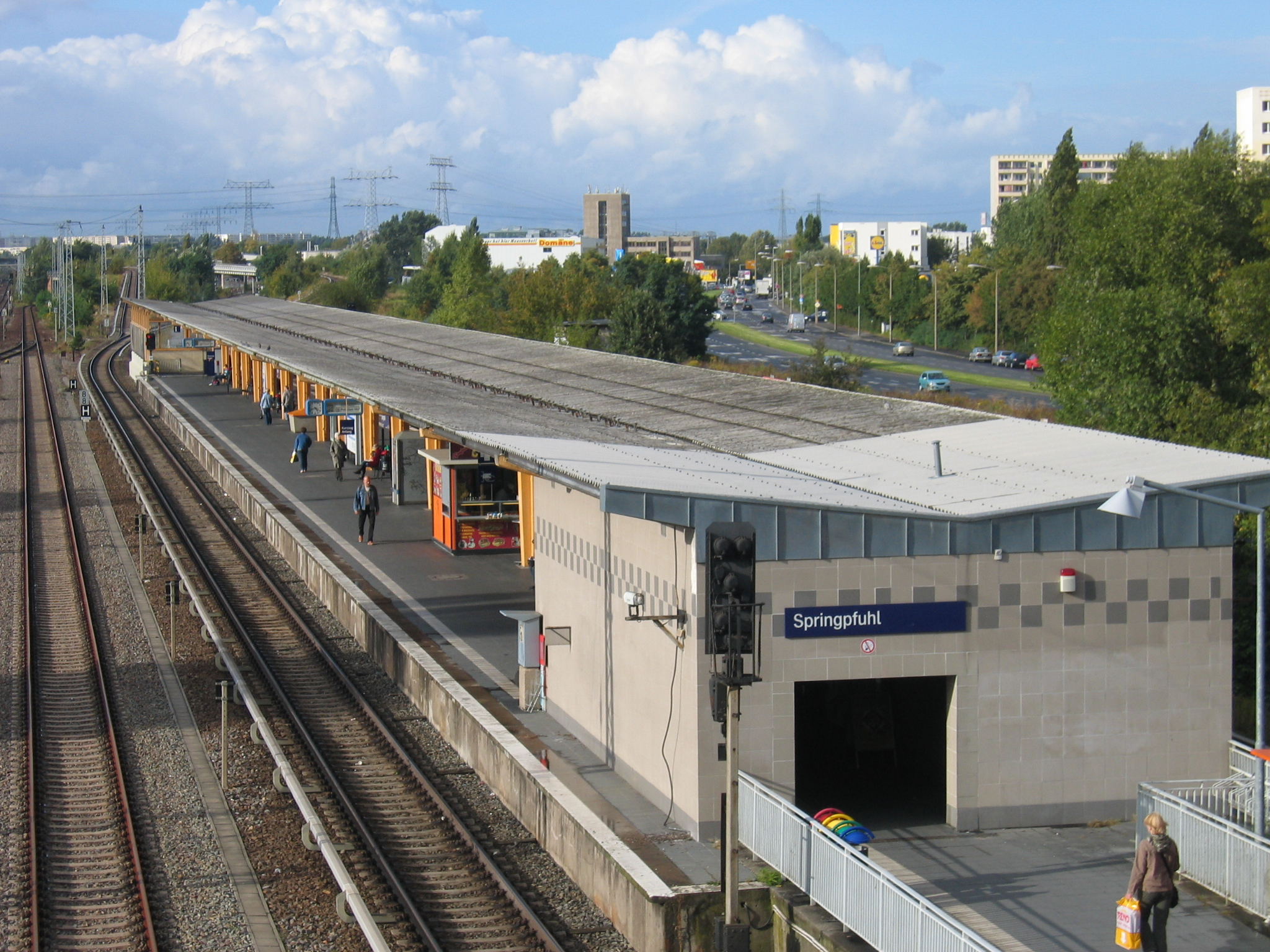

General information
- Location: Marzahn-Hellersdorf, Berlin, Berlin; Germany
- Platforms: 1 island platform
- Tracks: 2
- Connections: S7 S75

Other information
- Station code: 5934
- DS100 code: BSPH
- Category: 4
- Fare zone: : Berlin B/5656

History
- Opened: 30 December 1976; 49 years ago

Services
Preceding station	Berlin S-Bahn	Following station
Friedrichsfelde Ost towards Potsdam Hbf	S7	Poelchaustraße towards Ahrensfelde
Friedrichsfelde Ost towards Warschauer Straße	S75	Gehrenseestraße towards Wartenberg
Location

Springpfuhl is a railway station in the Marzahn district of Berlin. It is served by the S-Bahn lines S7 and S75.

The station opened on December 30, 1976, at the railway line to Wriezen built in 1898.
