= Berlin Poelchaustraße station =

Railway station in Berlin

Poelchaustraße
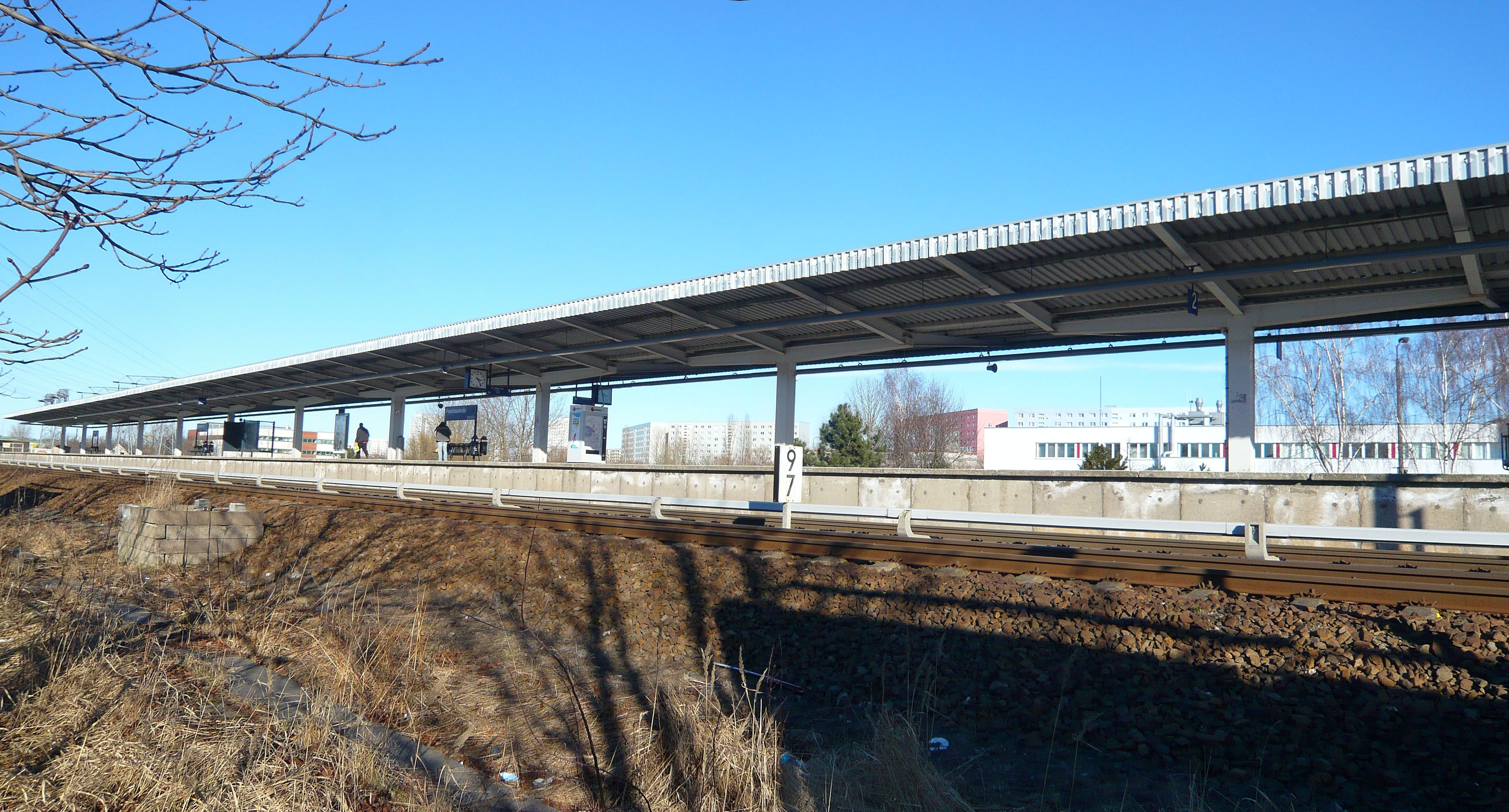

General information
- Location: Poelchaustraße/Märkische Allee; 12681 Berlin; Marzahn-Hellersdorf, Berlin, Berlin; Germany
- Coordinates: 52°32′8″N 13°32′8″E
- Owner: DB Netz
- Operator: DB Station&Service
- Line: Wriezen Railway
- Platforms: 1 island platform
- Tracks: 2
- Connections: S7

Other information
- Station code: 4976
- DS100 code: BPOE
- Category: 5
- Fare zone: : Berlin B/5656
- Website: s-bahn-berlin.de

History
- Opened: 28 September 1979; 46 years ago

Services
Preceding station	Berlin S-Bahn	Following station
Springpfuhl towards Potsdam Hbf	S7	Marzahn towards Ahrensfelde
Location

Berlin Poelchaustraße is a railway station in the Marzahn-Hellersdorf district of Berlin. It is served by the S-Bahn line S7.
