= Wriezen Railway =

Railway line in Germany

Berlin–Wriezen–Jädickendorf
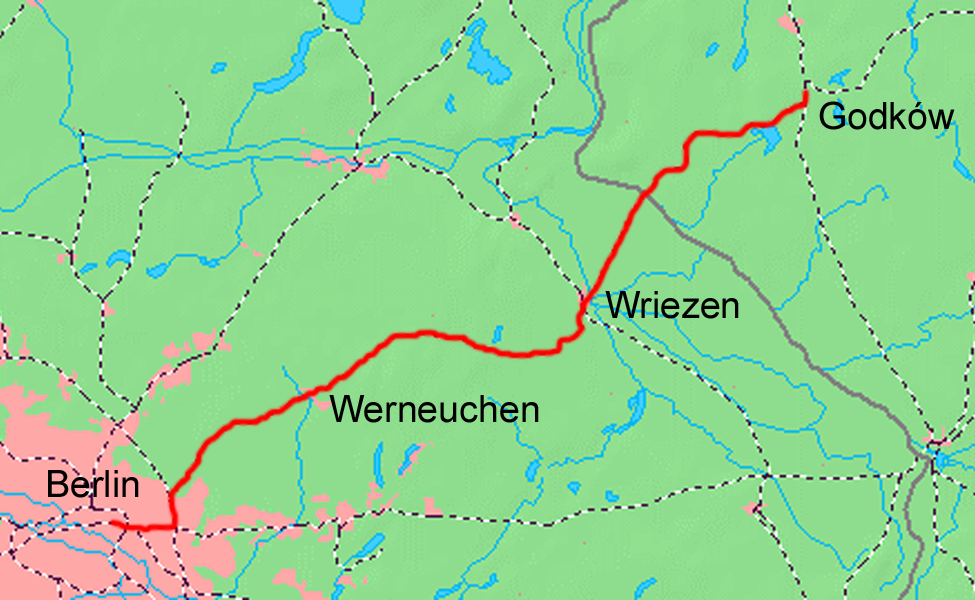

Overview
- Line number: 6958 S-Bahn: 6078 Wriezener Gbf–Lichtenberg; 6072 Lichtenberg–Ahrensfelde; 6528 Ahrensfelde–Wriezen; 6529 Wriezen–border; 411 border–Godków
- Locale: Berlin and Brandenburg, Germany

Service
- Route number: 200.7 S-Bahn; 209.25 Lichtenberg–Werneuchen

Technical
- Line length: 95.1 km (59.1 mi)
- Track gauge: 1,435 mm (4 ft 8 1/2 in) standard gauge
- Minimum radius: 300 m (984 ft)
- Electrification: 750 V DC
- Maximum incline: 0.1%

The Wriezen Railway is a line in the northeast of the German states of Berlin and Brandenburg. It runs from Berlin to Werneuchen and formerly extended via Wriezen to Jädickendorf (now Godków in Poland). Its terminus in Berlin from 1903 to 1949 was the Wriezener Bahnhof (Wriezen line station). The predominantly single-track line has operated only between Berlin-Lichtenberg station and Werneuchen since December 2006.

== Route ==
The line formerly branched off at Friedrichsfelde Ost from the Eastern Railway and ran to the north. Just after the first curve, there was Friedrichsfelde Friedhof station, serving Berlin's central cemetery. After two more curves, the line ran to the north-northeast. The section within the Berlin outer ring is not used today, trains now branch off the outer ring after Springpfuhl station on to the Wriezen line. Marzahn and Ahrensfelde both have freight yards and passenger stations. The line to Ahrensfelde is also served by S-Bahn line S 7. After Ahrensfelde the line turns more to the east, along the road to Bad Freienwalde. After Tiefensee, the line swung away from the road, running to the east for a while, and then to the north, where about 55 km from the junction with the Eastern Railway, it used to reach its terminus at Wriezen. From here, there were connections to Eberswalde, Frankfurt (Oder), Angermünde and Königsberg in der Neumark (now Chojna). Trains on the extension to Königsberg, which was opened in 1892, usually continued to Berlin on the Wriezen Railway.

== History ==
In 1866, the Eberswalde–Frankfurt (Oder) railway was opened. According to the initial plans of 1863, it was intended that there would be a perpendicular link from Berlin via Freienwalde and Zehden (now Cedynia) towards Neumark arise, but this line was not built.

Around 1870, Alexis Graf (count) von Haeseler, who was the administrator of the Landkreis (district) of Oberbarnim from 1845–1874 and had an estate in Harnekop, sought the implementation of these plans. He also offered to provide his own land free of charge, if necessary, for the establishment of the route of the line. It is it likely that the change of the route was due to Haeseler’s influence. In 1863 the route from Tiefensee along the existing highway through Freienwalde and Zehden to Königsberg was shorter and easier to build. It was now planned instead to build a railway line through Wriezen, which was longer and avoided almost all settlements, with the exception of Wriezen, and ran across undulating undeveloped country. However, this route ran past the count’s estate. The line, as built, runs through uncommonly beautiful scenery, but the stations were mostly far from the towns.

In 1873, the Minister of Trade, Commerce and Public Works, Heinrich von Achenbach charged the Mayor of Wriezen with the preparatory work for a railway from Berlin via Wriezen to Konitz (now Chojnice). Thus the government had agreed to the modified route. In 1886, the financing of the Wriezen–Jädickendorf line was secured under a state guarantee.

In 1888, the son of the count, Gottlieb von Haeseler, later a Prussian Field Marshal, revoked the promise previously given by his father to provide land for the construction of the railway. In the meantime, however, its alignment was fixed and in 1889 funds were approved for its construction from Berlin to Wriezen.

=== From its opening until 1944 ===
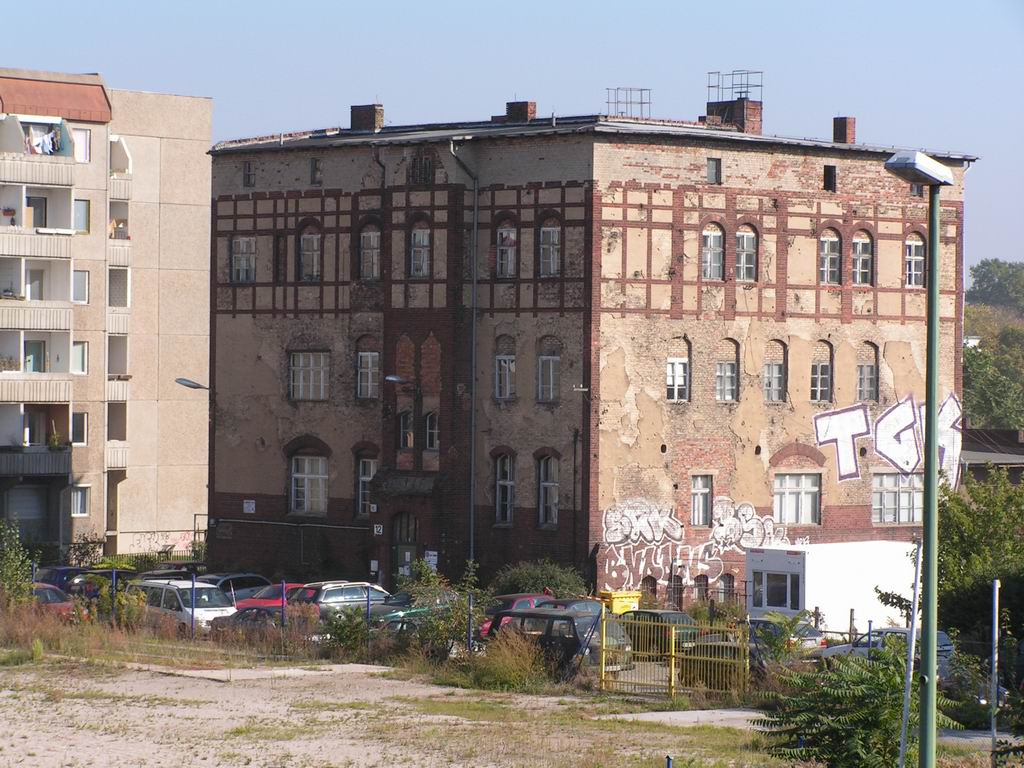
An administrative building of the former Wriezen line freight yard in Berlin

The eastern section from Wriezen to Königsberg opened to traffic on 20 December 1892. The western section between Lichtenberg-Friedrichsfelde (then located outside of Berlin, now Berlin-Lichtenberg) and Werneuchen opened to traffic on 1 May 1898. Stations were built in all towns along the line. The middle section from Werneuchen to Wriezen was completed on 15 October 1898. This allowed trains to run all the way from Lichtenberg to Konigsberg.

In 1903, the line was extended into Berlin. A satellite station was built north of the Silesian Station, which was then called Schlesischer Bahnhof (Wriezener Bahnsteig), that is Silesian Station (Wriezen platform). In 1924, it was renamed Wriezener Bahnhof (Wriezen line station). Trains ran to Friedrichsfelde junction parallel with the tracks of the Prussian Eastern Railway.

This line remained unchanged until early 1945. A halt was opened in 1903 at the Magerviehhof (meat market) between the stations of Zentralfriedhof Friedrichsfelde, and Marzahn. Werftpfuhl station opened in 1907.

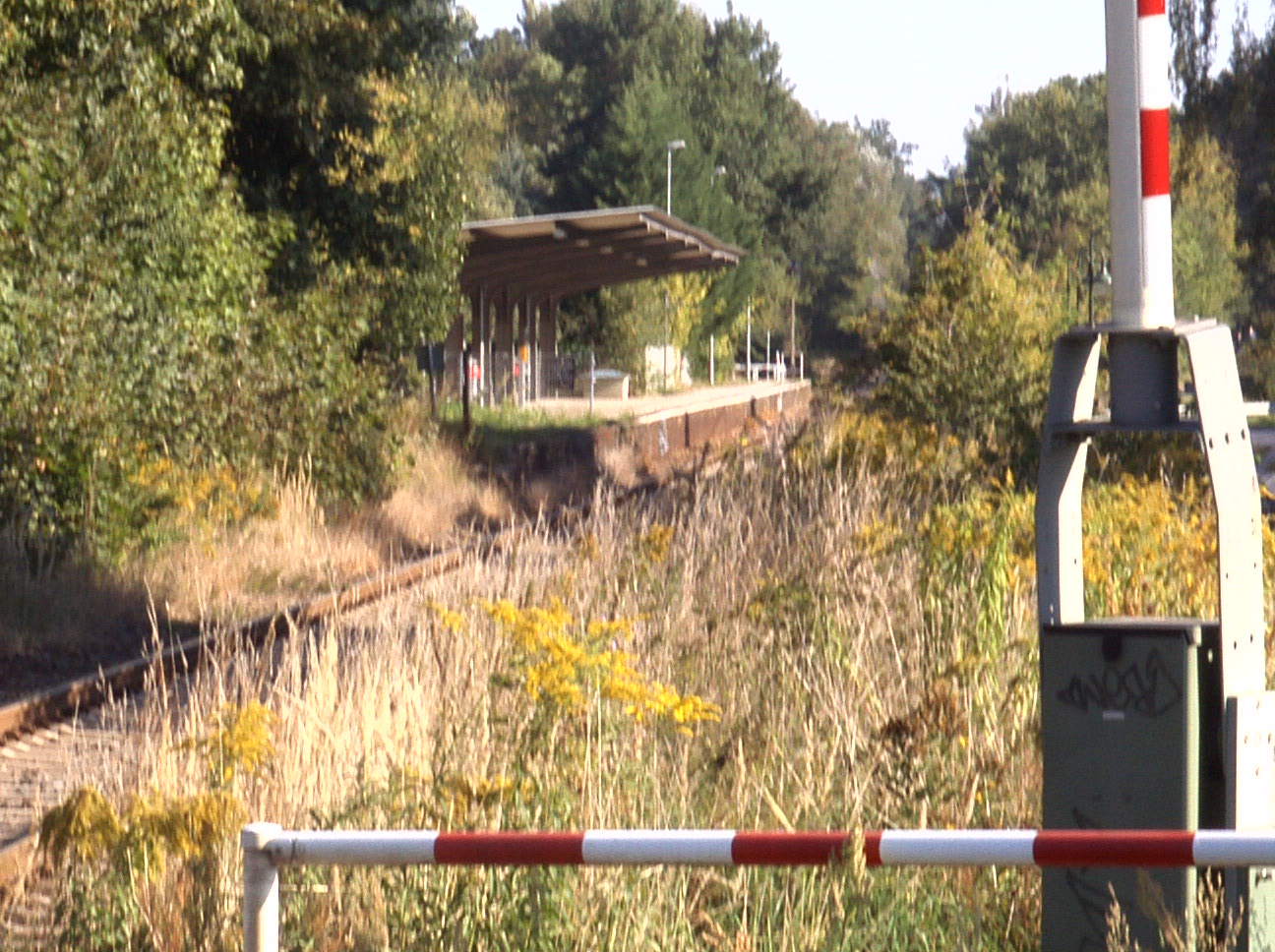
Line near Ahrensfelde Friedhof

Ahrensfelde Friedhof (cemetery) station was opened in July 1908 as a temporary halt. In October 1910, a three-tracked station with a covered central platform and a platform tunnel was opened. This was the third cemetery station on the line, because the next stop after Friedrichsfelde Friedhof station, Marzahn station is also at a cemetery.

The introduction of suburban operations was rejected in 1913, as the cost for doubling the track and the elimination of busy level crossings was considered too high. The main reason given was that very few settlements existed and no major settlement was expected on the fields between Marzahn and Ahrensfelde.

The Greater Berlin Act of 1 October 1920 meant that the city of Berlin extended to Ahrensfelde. Ahrensfelde station is just within Berlin, while Ahrensfelde village is just over the border.

In 1938, the Wriezen line became one of the last lines in the Berlin area to be included in the suburban fare zone, following pressure from, among others, the flying school in Werneuchen. As a result, suburban fares, then and now, continue to Werneuchen. At that time, it was intended to extend electric train operations to Werneuchen. A pair of tracks for the S-Bahn was to be built as far as Ahrensfelde next to the existing track; after that mixed operations of long-distance and S-Bahn services was to be provided. Diesel railcars were to be operated for traffic between Berlin and Königsberg. This plan were thwarted by the Second World War.

=== Oder bridge ===
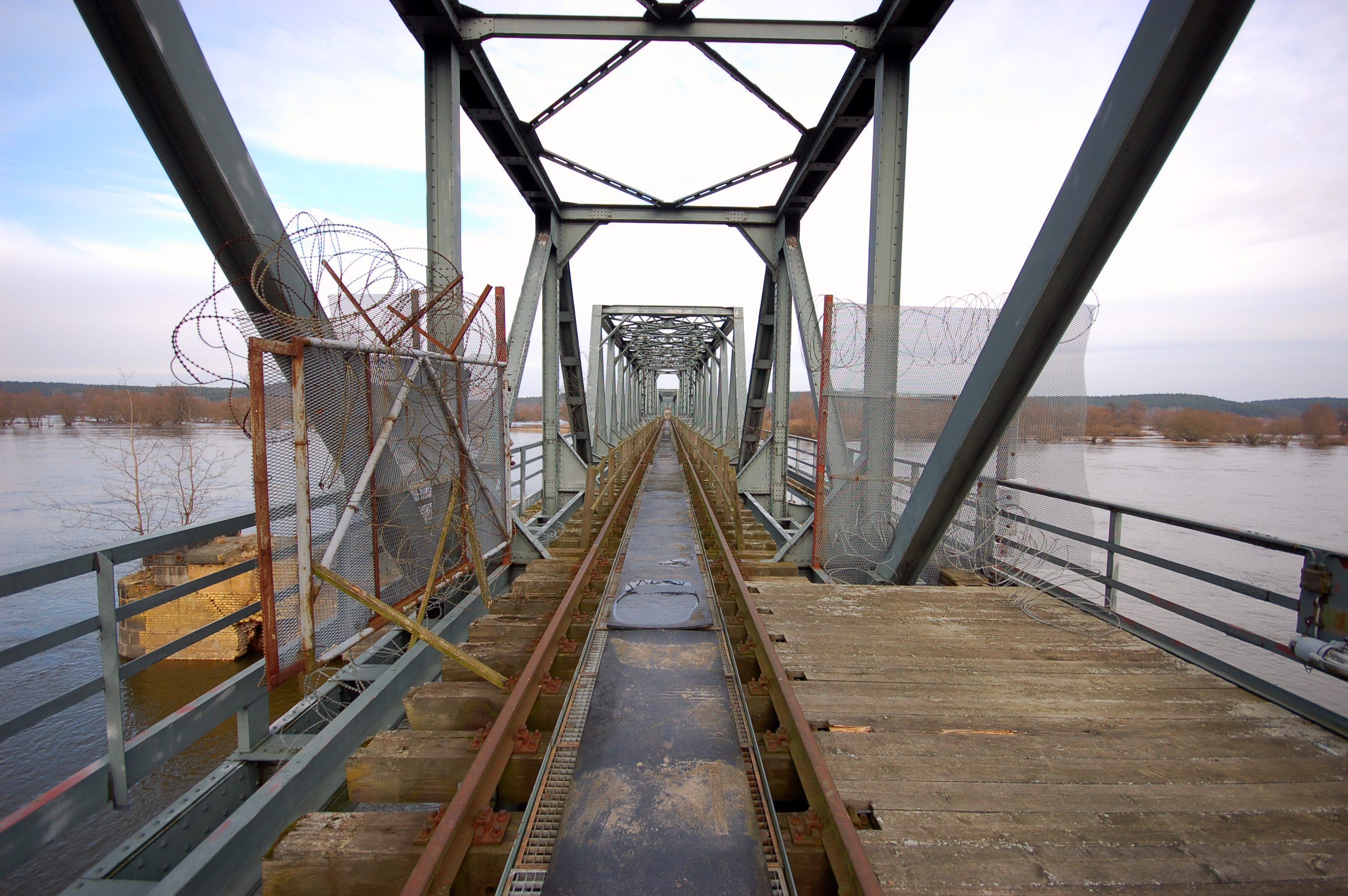
View over the Oder bridge

Construction of the railway bridge over the Oder started in 1890. The construction project consisted of two bridges and a causeway in between. Since there were no other bridges in the vicinity, it was built so that it could also be used as a road bridge. In 1910, the bridges were raised by 1.60 metres and the bridges bearings are reinforced to allow heavier trains to operate and larger boats to sail under it. In 1930, a new bridge was built next to the old bridge for the railway. The old bridge was now used only as a road bridge.

In February 1945, both bridges were blown up by German troops. The Oder then became the boundary between Germany and Poland. After that the line was owned by Deutsche Reichsbahn as far as the border, the rest was taken over by Polish State Railways.

The reconstruction of the Oder bridge lasted until 1955, but the line from Wriezen to Godków was set aside for military purposes. No trains ever ran over the new Oder bridge.

In 1984 (according to another source in 1976) on each side of the line new sidings were built branching off to the Oder dike. This was intended to support a technology developed by pioneers for building a parallel pontoon bridge for the railway in the event of possible damage to the bridge. The system was tested once in 1984 and was no longer operational in 1986.

The Oder bridge built in 1955 still exists. In the region there are discussions about a possible opening of the bridge as a border crossing.

=== The Berlin–Wriezen section of the line 1945–1990 ===
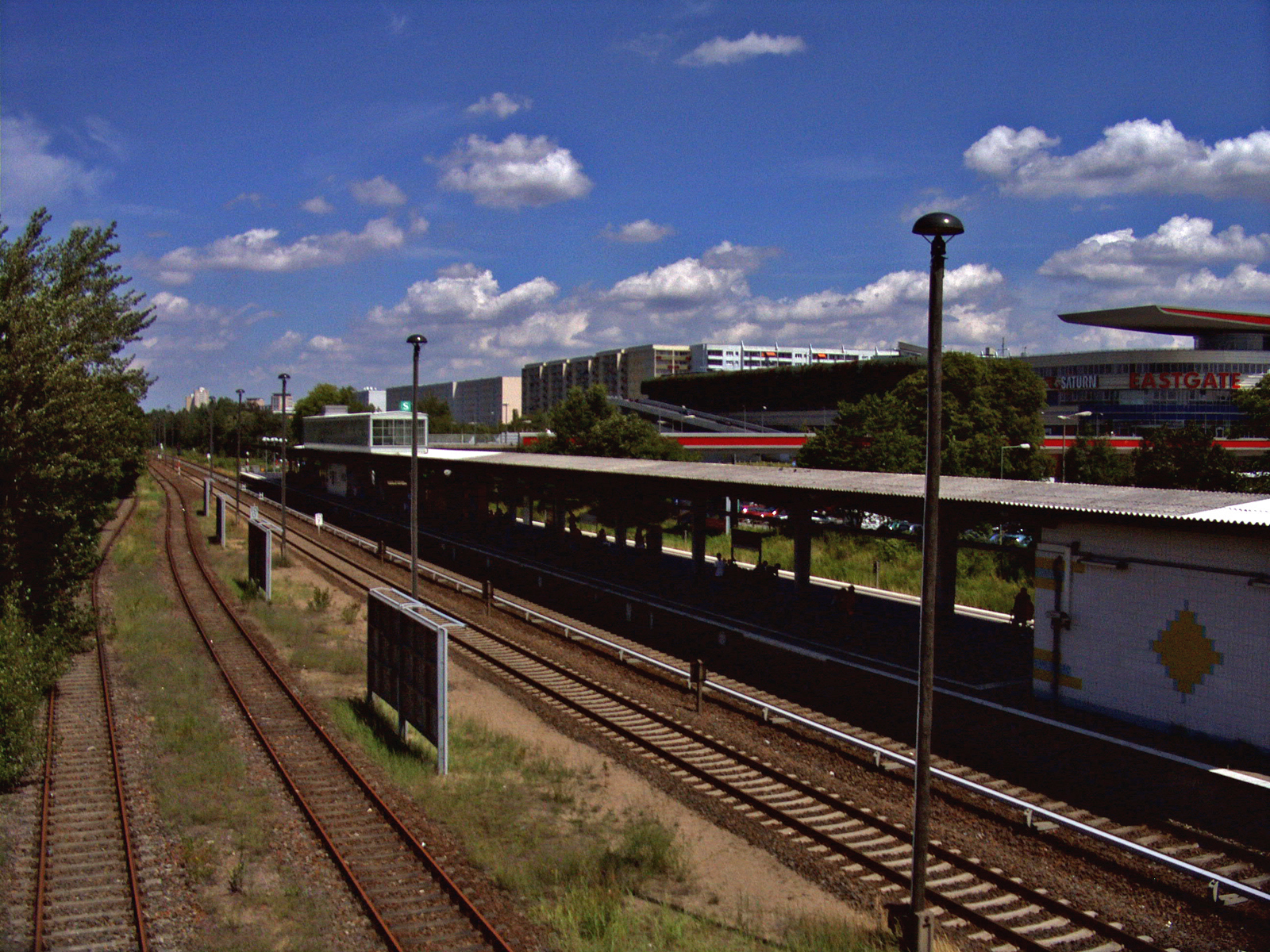
Marzahn S-Bahn station

Passenger operations between Berlin-Lichtenberg and Werneuchen, which was now in the Soviet occupation zone, were resumed in November 1945. Magerviehhof station remained permanently closed. The additional tracks at Ahrensfelde Friedhof station were eliminated and it became a simple halt on a single track as it still is.

The extension to Wriezen became operable only in August 1947, since the tracks from Werneuchen to Wriezen had been destroyed in April 1945 by a military railway plough.

Wriezener Bahnhof was reopened in May 1947 as the terminus in Berlin, but in December 1949 it was permanently closed for passenger traffic. Of the station’s buildings only an administration building is preserved. Trains have since started and ended again in Berlin-Lichtenberg station.

The second phase of planning for an S-Bahn began in the 1960s and had more concrete results than that of 30 years earlier. Major satellite developments were planned in Marzahn and Ahrensfelde; the S-Bahn would ensure access to the central city.

Since 1971, trains have no longer run on the traditional route along the shortest path from Lichtenberg via Magerviehhof to Marzahn, but instead initially continue from Friedrichsfelde on the Eastern Railway east to Biesdorf Cross and from there north on the Berlin outer ring to Marzahn. This change lengthened the route. The old route was used for freight. Later, the connection was severed at the Eastern Railway. A remaining section is still used for freight and is connected the Berlin-Nordost freight yard on the outer ring.

From 1976 the electric S-Bahn operated to Marzahn, serving two intermediate stations at Springpfuhl on the outer ring and Karl Maron (now Poelchaustraße) just past the junction. The local trains were cut back to start at Marzahn. The trains were initially used mainly by construction workers. The housing estate, built out of pre-fabricated, pre-stressed concrete, was still under construction; the district was completed three years after the opening of the S-Bahn.

In 1980, the S-Bahn was extended by two stations to Otto-Winzer-Straße (now Mehrower Allee station) and local trains were again cut back to start there. In 1982, the S-Bahn was extended to its current terminus at Ahrensfelde. Again the local trains on the Wriezen line (which ended mostly in Werneuchen) were cut back and now started in Ahrensfelde. In 1983 Ahrensfelde Nord station was opened.

=== Section from Wriezen to the Oder ===
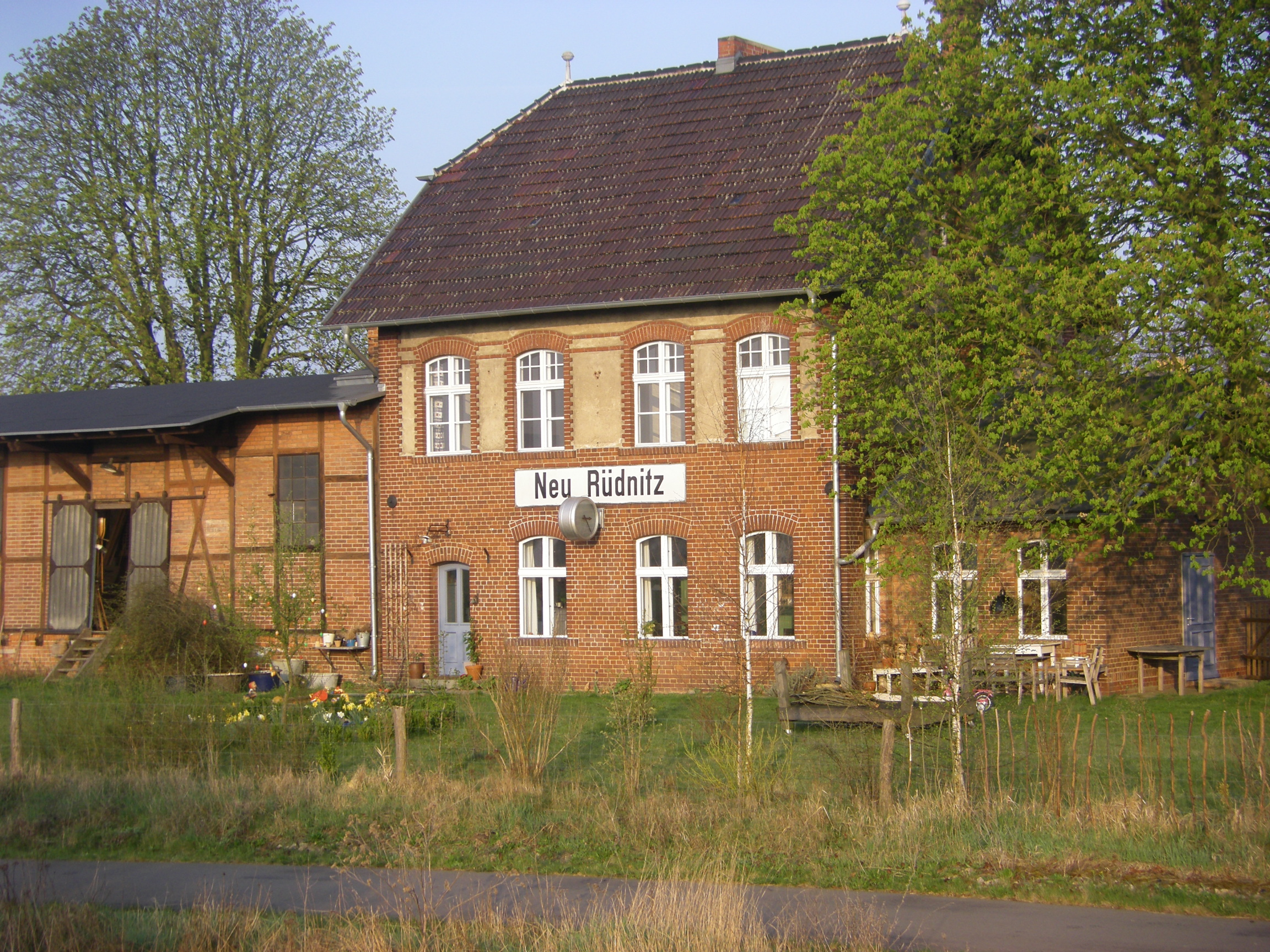
Neu Rüdnitz station (2009)

The rest of the German section of the line through the Oderbruch was dismantled in late 1945 as reparations to the Soviet Union. The line was restored during the reconstruction of the Oder bridge around 1955. In 1957, passenger traffic was resumed between Wriezen and Neurüdnitz, the last station before the Oder bridge. Operations on the line was divided into two sections, with passengers from Berlin having to change in Wriezen.

The line was also used for freight until 1965. The last passenger train ran in 1982. The line remained operational for military purposes. The tracks near the Oder bridge were used for the parking of freight wagons around 1990.

Track on this section was dismantled by 2000 and a paved bicycle path was created in 2005. The old station buildings have been sold to private users and some of them have been well restored. The bridge over the Alte (old) Oder still exists at Wriezen.

=== Section of the course in Poland ===
On the Polish side, there were passenger services between Godków (Jädickendorf) and Siekierki (Zäckerick-Alt Rüdnitz) until 31 July 1991. Freight traffic ended in late 1999. After a special excursion to Siekierki in 2002, the line was closed.

=== Berlin–Wriezen section since 1990 ===
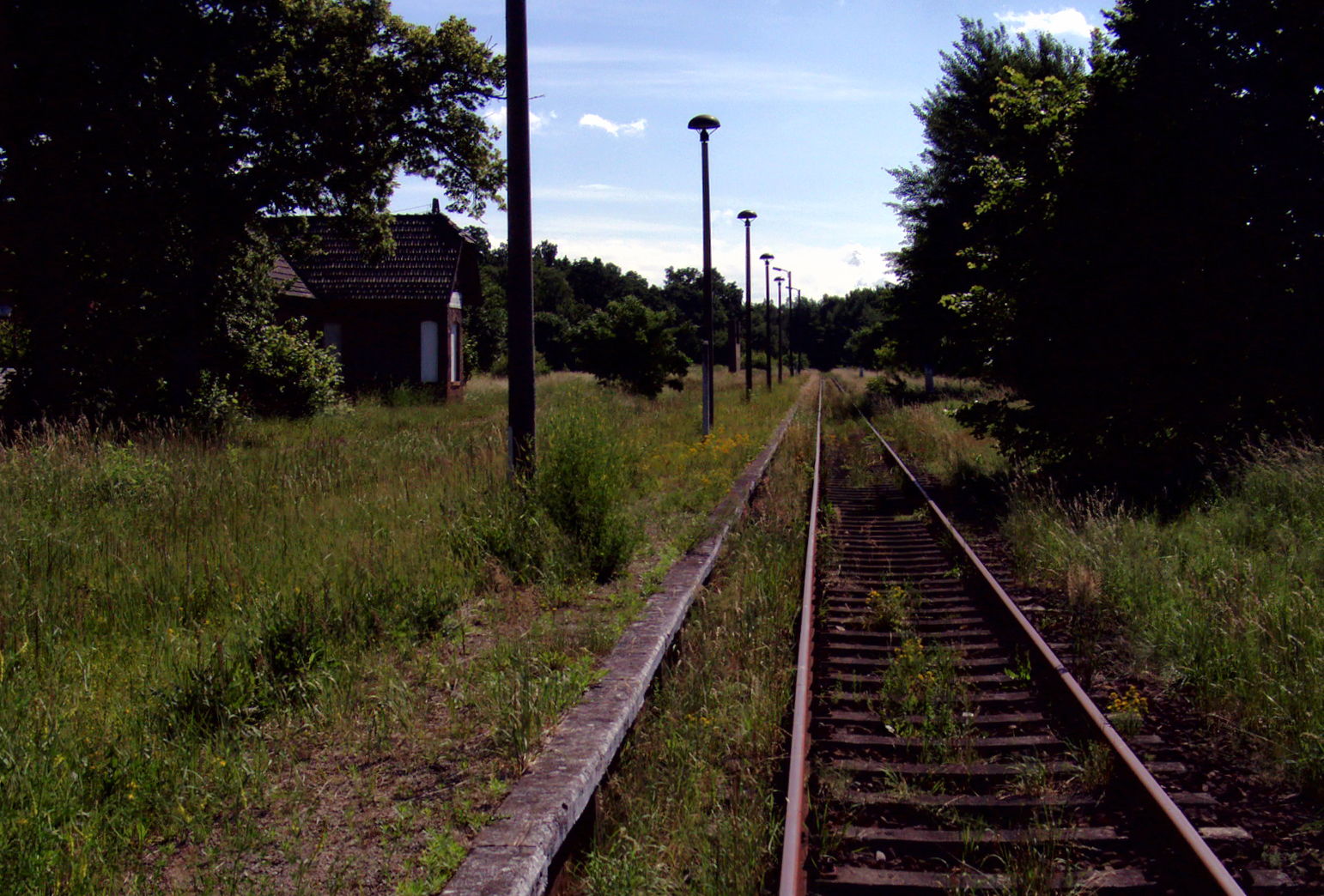
Line and former station in Leuenberg

After the political change in East Germany (Die Wende) in 1990, regional services were again extended to Berlin-Lichtenberg. They go from Ahrensfelde to Lichtenberg without stopping. Even Marzahn station is not served, although it is now the centre of a district with a population that has grown to 160,000.

After 1990, the name of Poelchaustraße station was changed to honour Harald Poelchau rather than Karl Maron. The S-Bahn line was designated as line S 7 and, in the years after 1990, the Regionalbahn service was called R 7.

On 18 April 1998, passenger services were discontinued from Tiefensee to Wriezen. Trains from Berlin then operated only to Tiefensee (every two hours) or Werneuchen (hourly). Wriezen station has since only been served by the tangential Eberswalde–Frankfurt line. Freight traffic was also discontinued between Tiefensee and Wriezen. The section between Wriezen and Tiefensee was closed on 15 December 1999. Southwest of Wriezen a short section of the line was dismantled to allow to building of a new section of the B 167 federal highway. From Tiefensee to Sternebeck the line is now used for operating draisines. A heritage railway operates on the line from Sternebeck until shortly before Wriezen (the 59.2 km point at the former Krautwurst junction). It is planned to construct a terminus for the heritage railway’s operations near the level crossing at Vevais.

In 2002, Ostdeutsche Eisenbahn began operating passenger services between Berlin and Tiefensee and the service is now designated as OE 25. Passenger services were abandoned between Werneuchen and Tiefensee at the beginning of the 2006/2007 timetable on 10 December 2006.

There are still substantial freight operations to Ahrensfelde and Werneuchen.

Since 2006 the municipality of Ahrensfelde and the state of Brandenburg have planned to build a new station in the Ahrensfelde-Rehhahn industrial area on the initiative of a local hotelier. The station was originally planned to go into operation in December 2008. This date could not be met because, although the residents are willing to finance the construction of the station, no agreement has been reached on financing the costs of ongoing operations of the station and the level of fares. Therefore, the municipality wants a private operator. This is not provided for in the Ordinance on the Construction and Operation of Railways, so a change in federal legislation would be required.
