= ORWOhaus =

Coordinates: 52°32′14″N 13°31′48″E

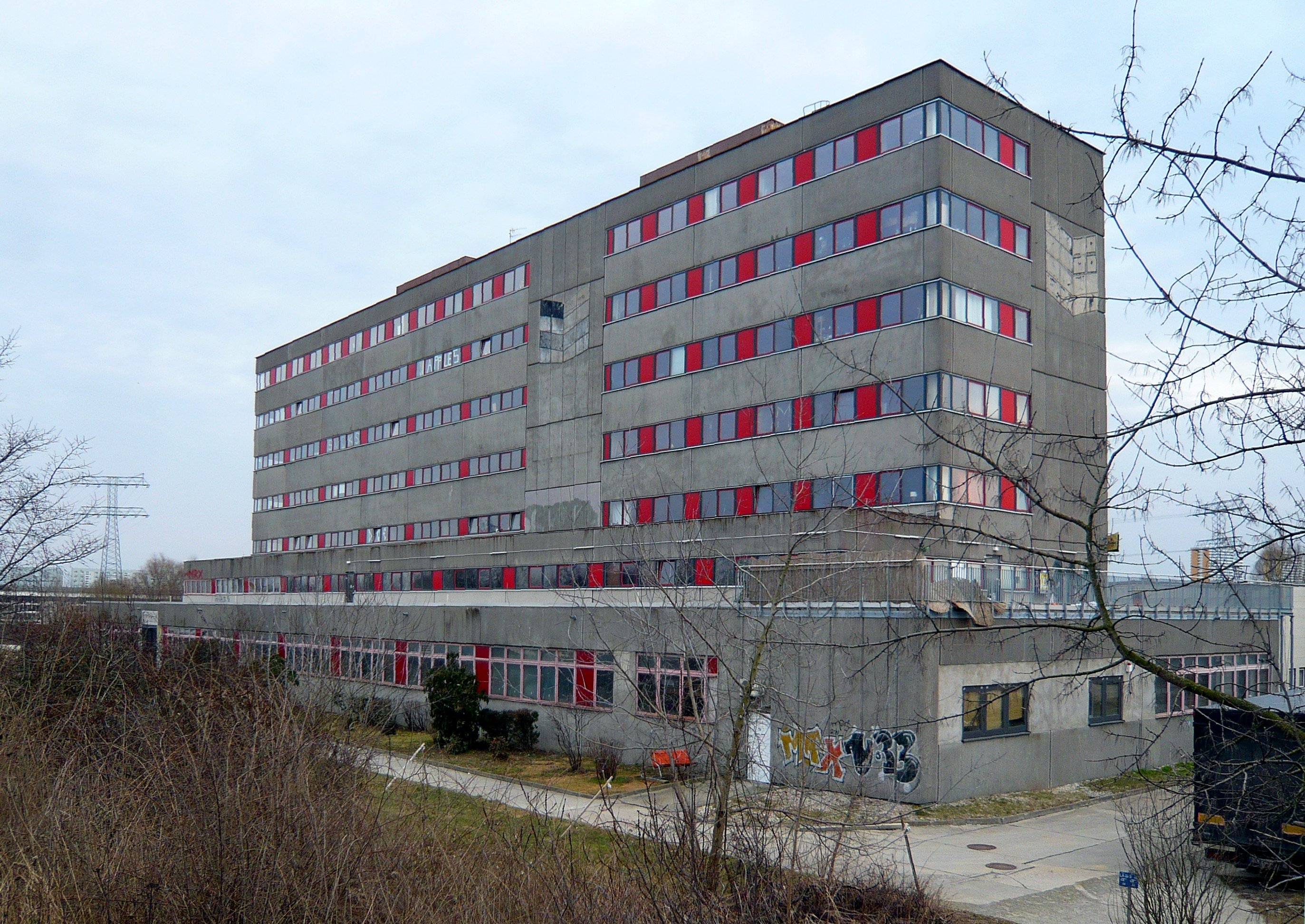
The ORWOhaus seen from the Landsberger Allee (north)

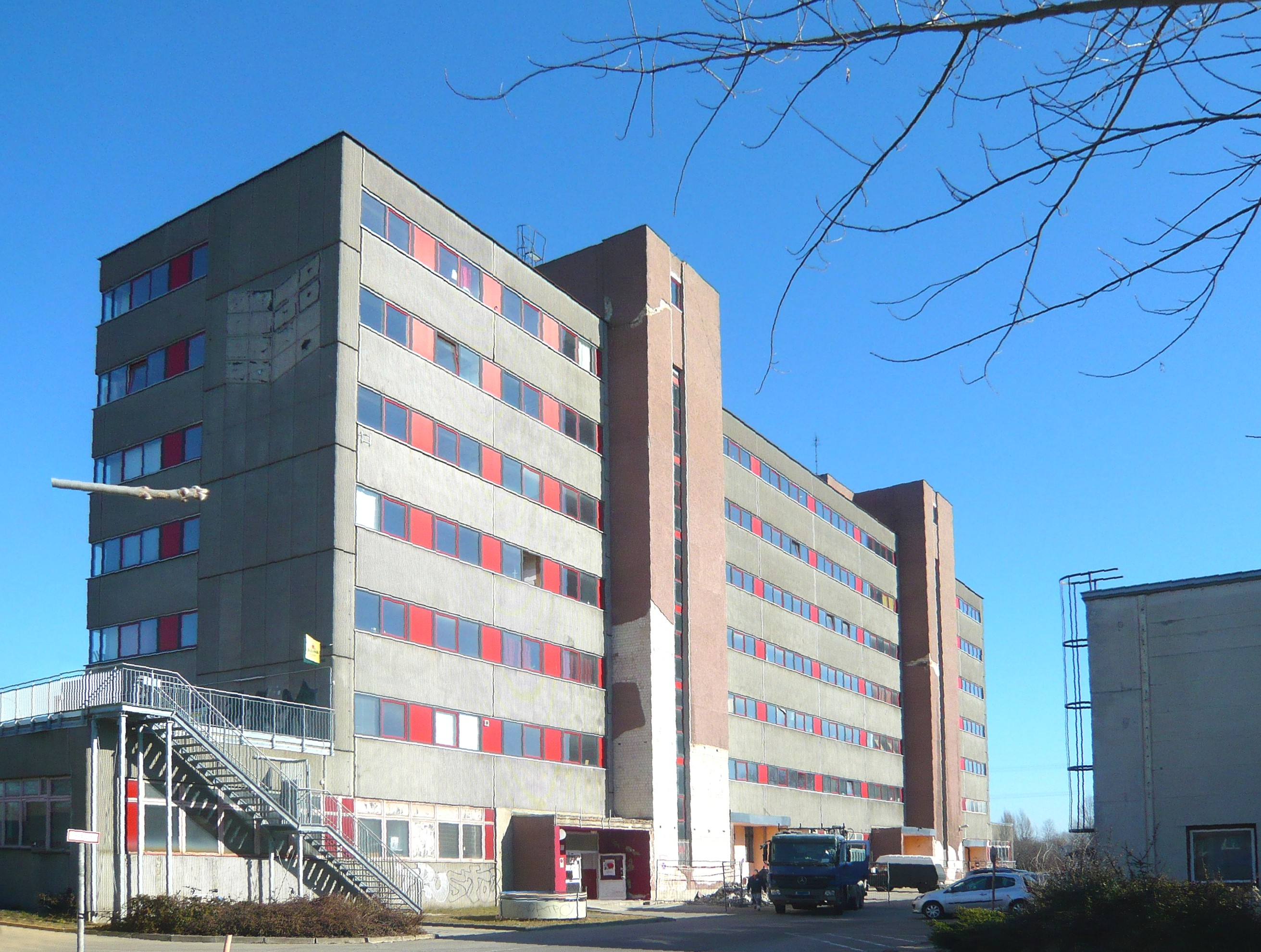
The ORWOhaus seen from the south

The ORWOhaus is a Berlin-based musical collective. It is located in a 1970s industrial building in Marzahn-Hellersdorf district of Berlin.

Built for the ORWO company which produced photographic film, by 1990 the building was owned by the property company TLG (Treuhandliegenschaftsgesellschaft), and was mostly empty, with some floors used by other companies for storage. From 1998 it was increasingly used by bands for rehearsal space, thanks to its isolation in an industrial estate. In June 2004 the lack of statutory fire protection meant that the owners had to close the building. By that time approximately 400 musicians had found a place for rehearsals, and had extensively adapted and furnished their rooms.

By use of protests and the occasional occupation they generated publicity for the project, and gained support from the press and local politicians. Berlin senator Thomas Flierl negotiated with the TLG and achieved an agreement. A non-profit association "ORWOhaus" was created that gained financial support from the National Lottery, and recognition from the "Germany - Land of Ideas" initiative. On 30 April 2005, the ORWOhaus association signed a sales contract, which was confirmed at the end of May 2006. Repairs to bring the building up-to-date were begun and in July 2006 a music festival mounted.

In mid-2007 — after two years of campaigning by ORWOhaus musicians to have the street's name changed — their street (Street 13) was renamed "Frank-Zappa-Straße" after American composer and musician Frank Zappa. Sheik Yerbouti — a Frank Zappa cover band; Napoleon Murphy Brock; and sixteen other bands celebrated the renaming with an all-night concert. More than 2,800 people attended the concert, which was held on the final weekend of July, 2007.

As the reason for their efforts to rename the street, a spokesperson for the ORWOhaus association is quoted by the AP as saying: "...he was without taboo, musically versatile, provocative, and didn't allow himself to be captured by capitalistic enterprises.".

== Facilities ==
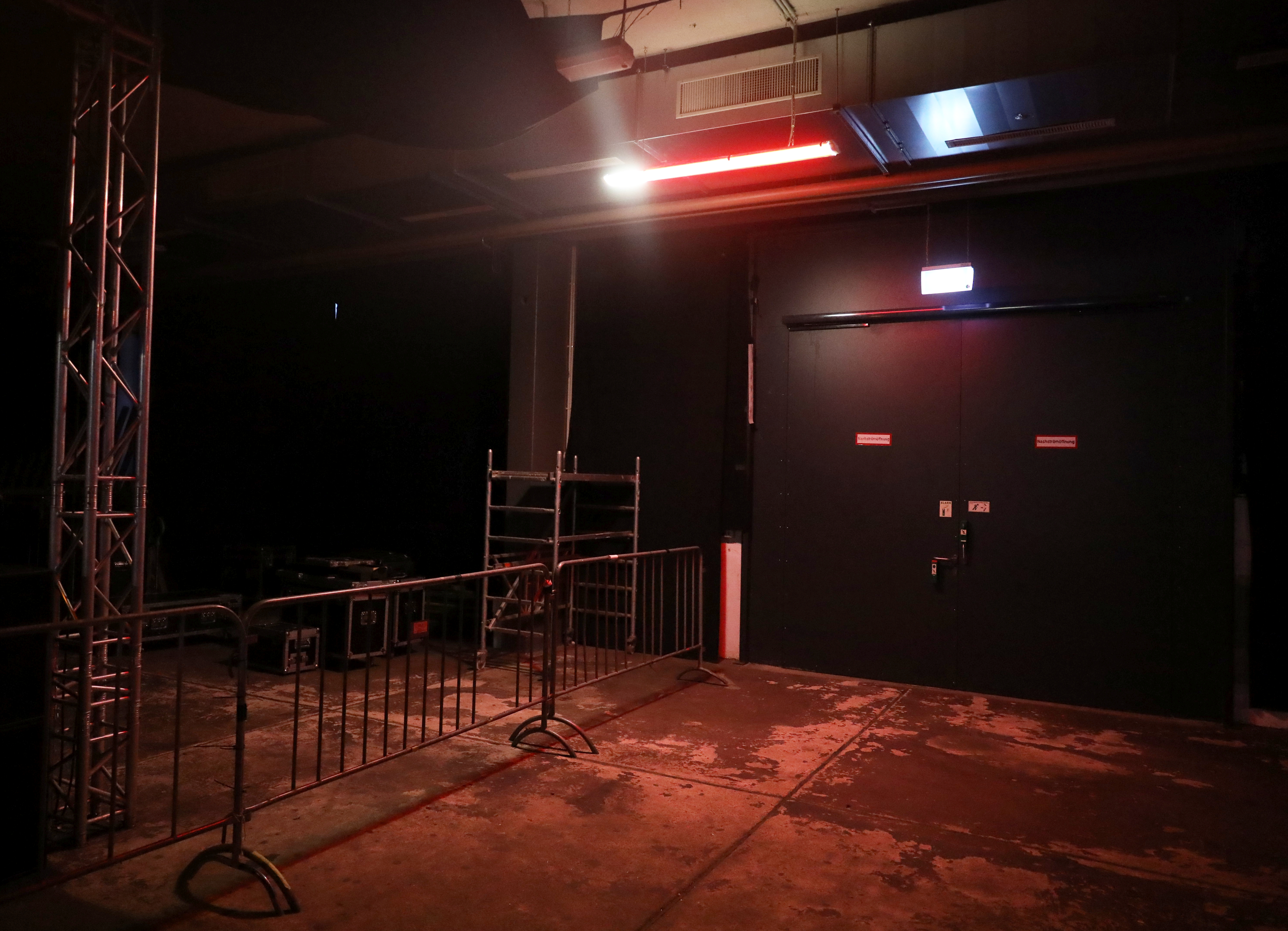
Event space in ORWOhaus

The ORWOhaus is a unique facility for musicians and artists in Berlin. It offers meeting places, studios, and music services in approximately 2500sq.m. of space, open around the clock. In addition there are booking agents, companies providing event management and promotion, graphic and web design, equipment rental and artist management. On the ground floor concerts and workshops can be organized. A café with a roof terrace is planned in which musicians can meet, exchange ideas and make contacts.
