= Berlin-Marzahn station =

Railway station in Berlin, Germany

Berlin Marzahn
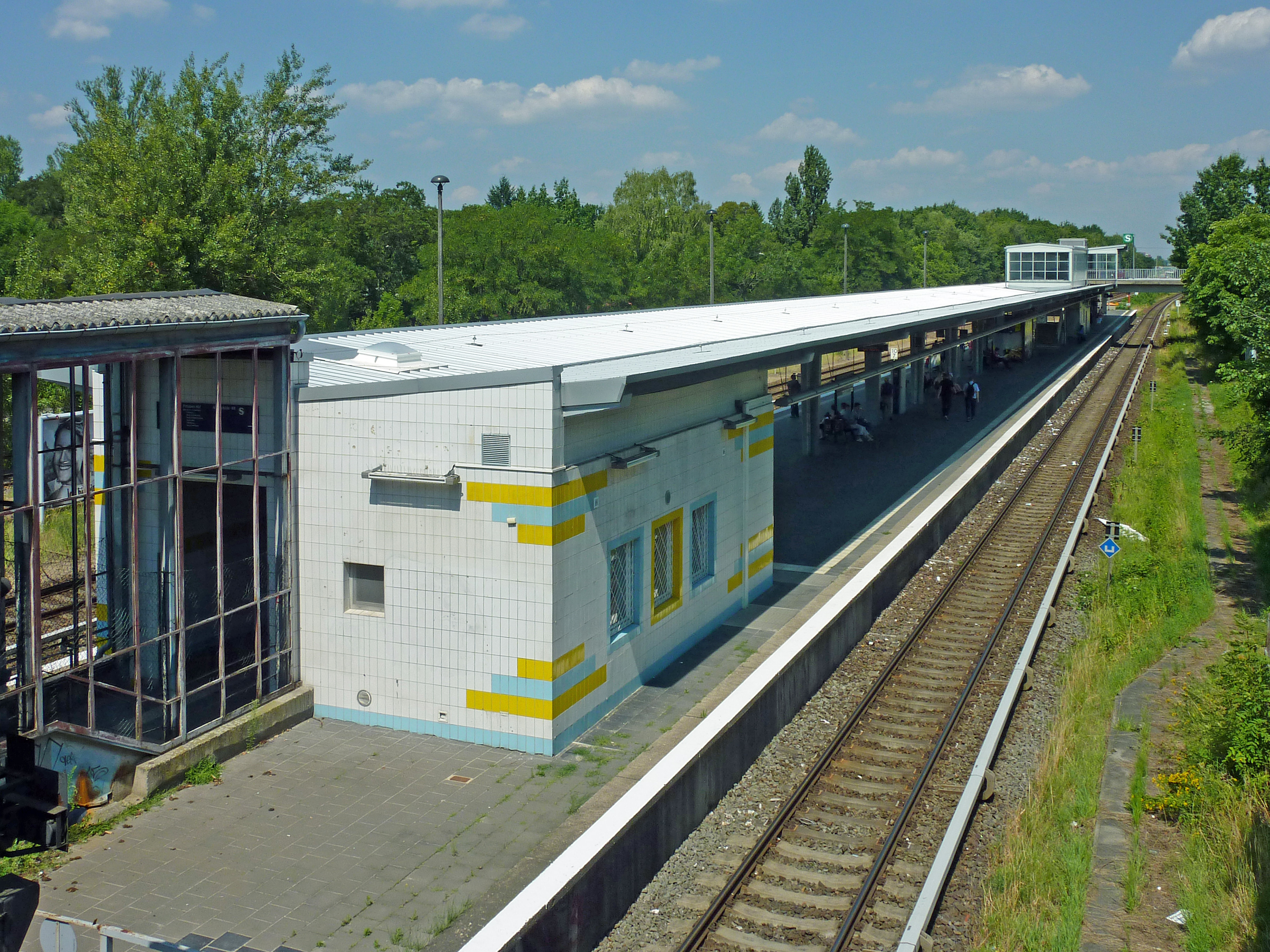

General information
- Location: Marzahn-Hellersdorf, Berlin; Germany
- Coordinates: 52°32′38″N 13°32′29″E
- Line: Wriezen Railway
- Platforms: 1 island platform
- Tracks: 2
- Connections: S7

Other information
- Station code: 553
- DS100 code: BMAR
- Category: 4
- Fare zone: : Berlin B/5656
- Website: www.bahnhof.de

History
- Opened: 1 May 1898

Services
| Preceding station | Berlin S-Bahn | Following station |
|---|---|---|
| Poelchaustraße towards Potsdam Hbf | S7 | Raoul-Wallenberg-Straße towards Ahrensfelde |
Location

Marzahn is a railway station in the Marzahn-Hellersdorf district of Berlin. It is served by the S-Bahn line S7. The major shopping mall Eastgate Berlin is located next to the station and linked to it by a footbridge.
