= Mehrower Allee station =

Railway station in Germany

Mehrower Allee
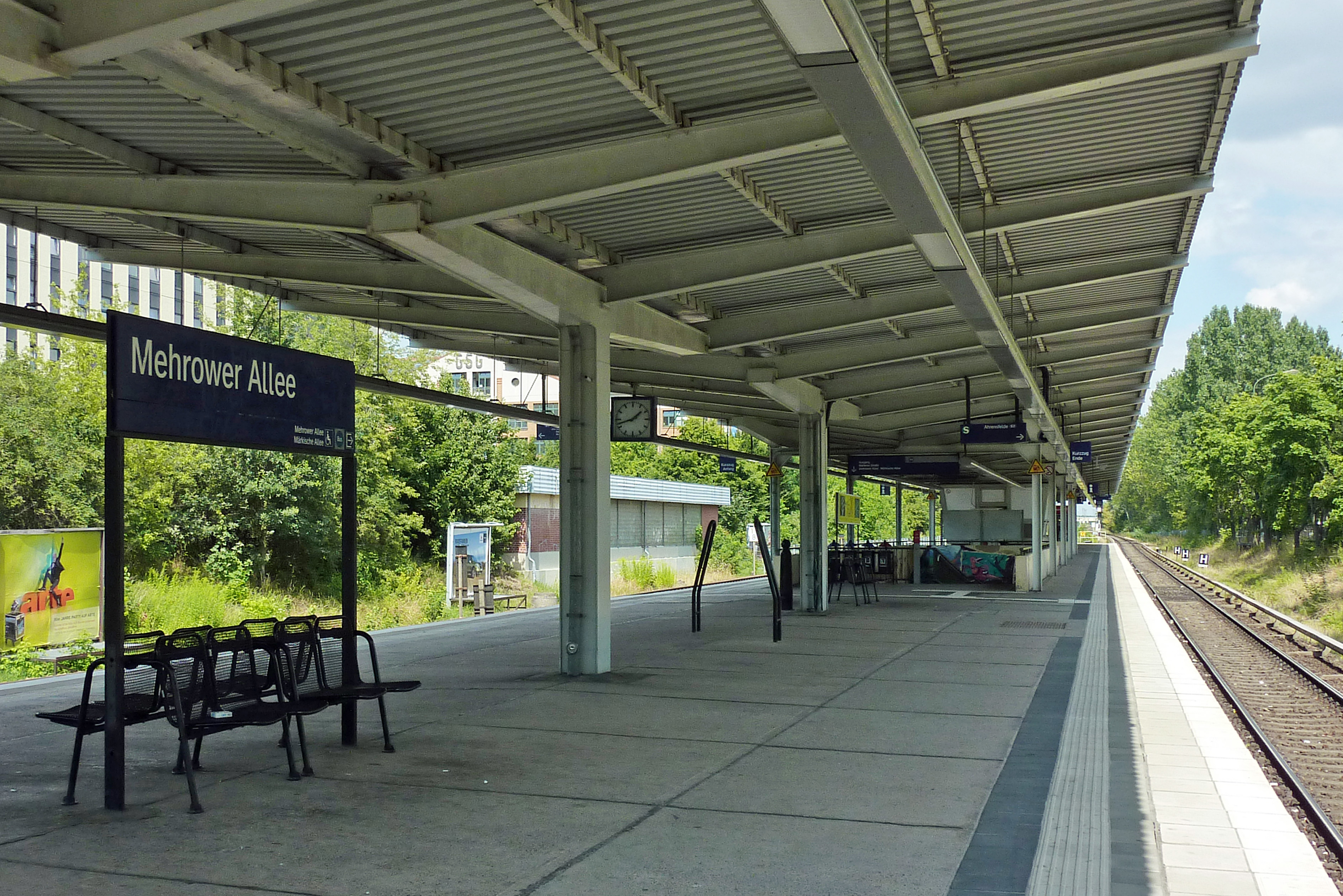

General information
- Location: Marzahn-Hellersdorf, Berlin; Germany
- Coordinates: 52°33′27″N 13°33′13″E
- Owner: DB Netz
- Operator: DB Station&Service
- Line: Wriezen Railway
- Platforms: 1 island platform
- Tracks: 2
- Connections: S7

Other information
- Station code: 4027
- DS100 code: BMEA
- Category: 5
- Fare zone: : Berlin B/5656
- Website: www.bahnhof.de

History
- Opened: 15 December 1980; 45 years ago

Services
Preceding station	Berlin S-Bahn	Following station
Raoul-Wallenberg-Straße towards Potsdam Hbf	S7	Ahrensfelde Terminus
Location

Mehrower Allee is a railway station in the Marzahn-Hellersdorf district of Berlin. It is served by the S-Bahn line S7.
