= S7 (Berlin) =

Overview
- Locale: Berlin

Service
- System: Berlin S-Bahn
- Operator(s): S-Bahn Berlin GmbH
- Rolling stock: DBAG Class 481

Technical
- Electrification: 750 V DC Third rail

S7 is a line on the Berlin S-Bahn. It operates from Ahrensfelde to Potsdam over:

- the Wriezen Railway, completed on 1 May 1898 and electrified to Marzahn in 1976, to Mehrower Allee in 1980 and to Ahrensfelde in 1982,
- a section of the Outer ring, completed in the early 1940s as part of the Outer freight ring and electrified in 1976,
- a section of the Prussian Eastern line, opened on 1 October 1866 and electrified on 6 November 1928,
- the Stadtbahn, opened on 7 February 1882 and electrified on 11 June 1928,
- a section of the Berlin-Blankenheim line, opened west of Grunewald in 1879 and further east in 1882 and electrified in 1928 and
- a section of the Berlin-Potsdam-Magdeburg line, opened in 1838 and electrified in 1928.

== Service history ==
The S7 was created on 2 June 1991, replacing the Red route of the East Berlin S-Bahn between Alexanderplatz and Ahrensfelde, with the western terminus extended to Friedrichstraße.

== Gallery ==
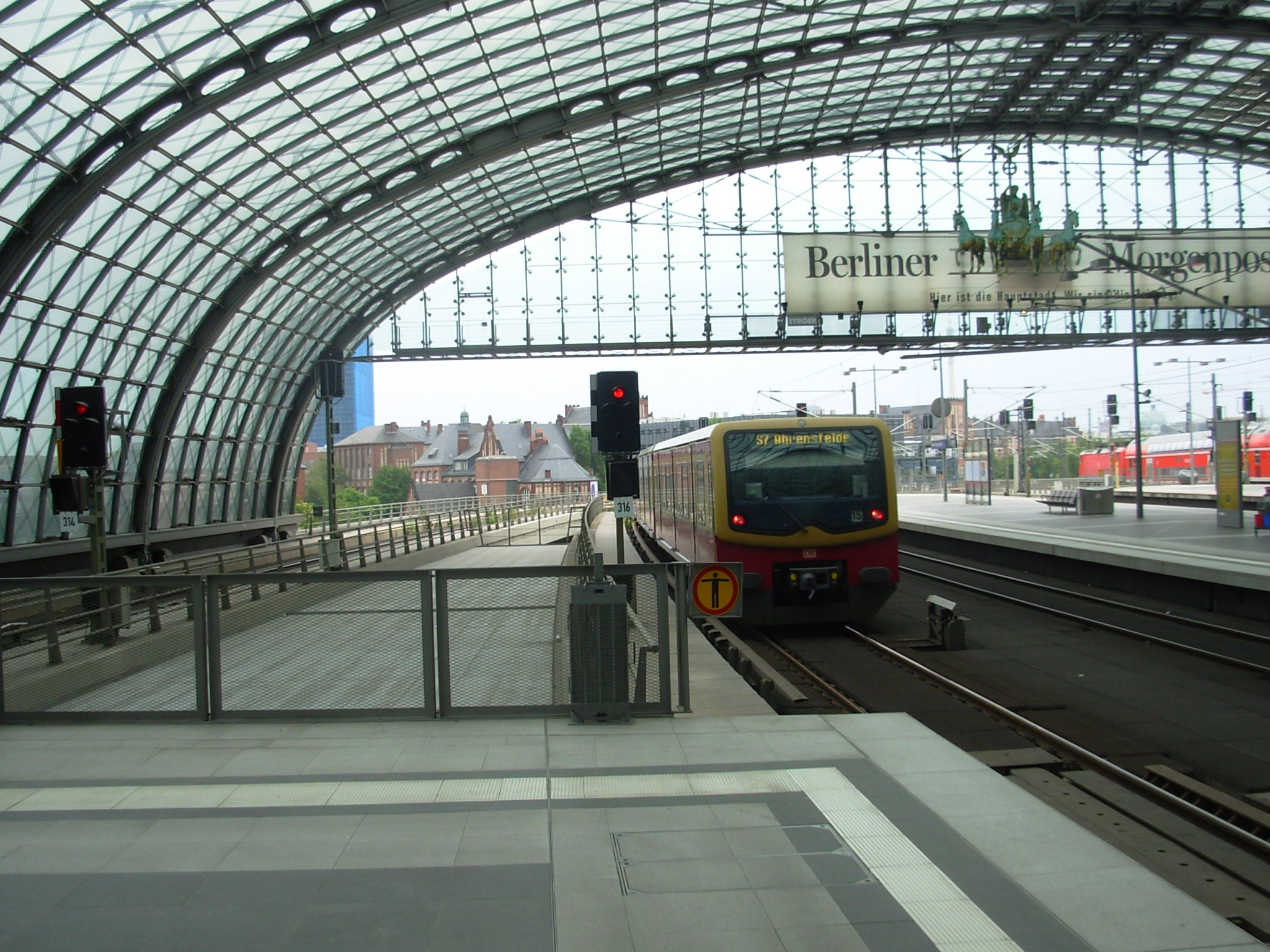
S7 leaving Berlin Hauptbahnhof en route for Ahrensfelde
