= Ahrensfelde station =

Railway station in Berlin, Germany

Ahrensfelde
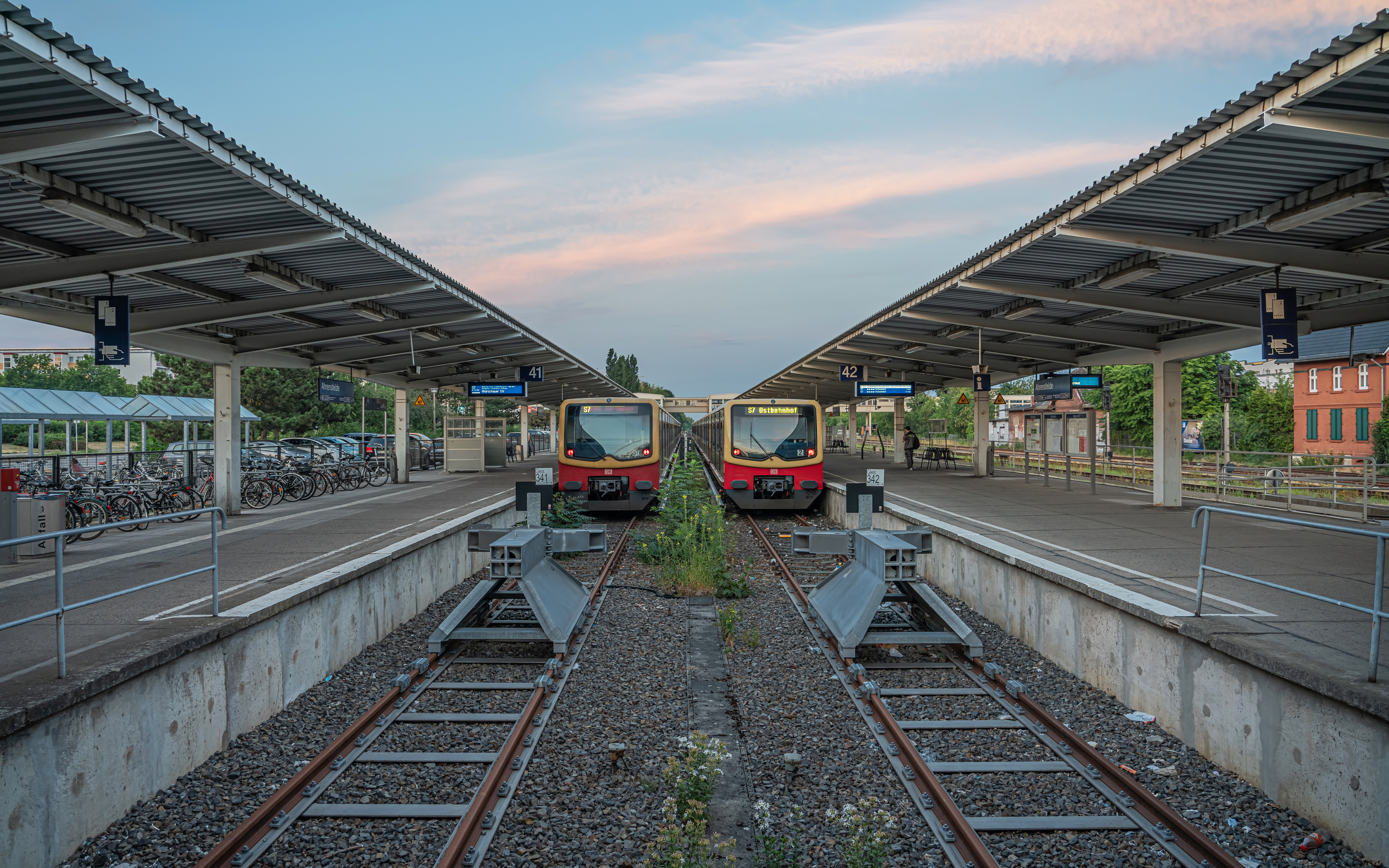

General information
- Location: Märkische Allee, Ahrensfelde, Berlin; Germany
- Coordinates: 52°34′16″N 13°33′55″E
- Owner: Deutsche Bahn
- Operator: DB Station&Service
- Line: Wriezen Railway
- Platforms: 1 island platform 1 side platform
- Tracks: 3
- Train operators: Niederbarnimer Eisenbahn; S-Bahn Berlin
- Connections: : M8; : 16; : 197, 390, N97

Construction
- Structure type: At-grade
- Cycle facilities: Bicycle parking
- Accessible: Yes

Other information
- Station code: 28
- DS100 code: BAHR
- IBNR: 8011003
- Category: 4
- Fare zone: : Berlin B/5656
- Website: www.bahnhof.de

History
- Opened: 1 May 1898

Passengers
- < 50,000 (2006)

Services
Preceding station	Niederbarnimer Eisenbahn	Following station
Berlin-Lichtenberg towards Berlin Ostkreuz	RB 25	Ahrensfelde Friedhof towards Werneuchen
Preceding station	Berlin S-Bahn	Following station
Mehrower Allee towards Potsdam Hbf	S7	Terminus
Location

Ahrensfelde station is a station serving regional and S-Bahn services in the Berlin borough of Marzahn-Hellersdorf. It is located on the border of Berlin just outside the municipality of Ahrensfelde, which is in the state of Brandenburg. The station has three platform edges, one side platform for the S-Bahn, and an island platform for Regionalbahn and S-Bahn services.

== Location ==
This station is located within parts of Ahrensfelde. It was located within parts of Falkenberg, which, with the passing of the Greater Berlin Act in 1920, became a part of Weißensee. In 1979, the boundary was moved with the new formation of the city of Marzahn, which in 2001 was absorbed into the district of Marzahn-Hellersdorf.

The station is operationally composed of two independent stations. The Ahrensfelde station (hereinafter referred to as remote station) is used for regional trains, while the Ahrensfelde (S-Bahn) station (hereinafter S-Bahn station) is the east adjacent station of the Berlin S-Bahn. The depots are located at the Wriezener Bahn, which includes three local routes according to the list of local permissible speeds (VzG). These are the VzG routes 6072 (Berlin-Lichtenberg - Ahrensfelde) and 6528 (Ahrensfelde - Wriezen) on the mainline and the VzG route 6011 (Berlin-Friedrichsfelde Ost - Ahrensfelde S-Bahn) on the S-Bahn. In the directory of stations, the station is run as BAHR for the long-distance railway section and BAF for the S-Bahn section. The station has three platform edges, a side platform for the S-Bahn (track 161), and a common island platform for regional and S-Bahn (tracks 161 and 24).

The long-distance station is limited by entrance signals 61 (km 12,647) from Berlin-Lichtenberg and 90 (km 13,990) from the direction of Wriezen. The station has five main tracks, of which track 26 is the main thoroughfare. All main tracks are equipped with extension signals in both directions. Track 24, where the platform is located, is again divided by the intermediate signals 75 and 76 before turnout 14. Two additional side tracks (tracks 29 and 30) are no longer available. The S-Bahn station is limited by entry signals 1039 (regular track, km 13,561) and 1037 (counter track, km 13,482). The continuous main tracks to the platforms are tracks 161 and 162, at them are exit signals 1042 and 1044. A trapezoidal change between the two tracks is possible. Siding 23 is located in the extension direction west of the main tracks. About the points connection 13-14 vehicles between the two stations can be implemented.

The reception building from the station's opening in 1898 is located on a side branch of Ahrensfelder Chaussee west of the tracks. The ensemble of the reception building and various outbuildings from the time is a listed building. The 1982 reception building is located north of the S-Bahn tracks. In the northern section, there is a railroad crossing where Ahrensfelder Chaussee crosses the mainline.

The operation and monitoring of the signaling equipment is carried out by the Ahr interlocking. The construction, which was put into operation around 1982, is a GS II 64b relay interlocking. It replaced an older mechanical interlocking from the opening period.

== History ==
The station was opened simultaneously with the Wriezen Railway on 1 May 1898, but over the years was never in the municipality of Ahrensfelde. Initially the station premises were in the Gutsbezirk (a rural district owned and controlled by a landlord) of Falkenberg, which under the Greater Berlin Act became part of the district of Weissensee. In 1979, it became part of the new borough of Marzahn and, in 2001, Marzahn was absorbed into Marzahn-Hellersdorf.

In the time of the Third Reich, it was proposed that the S-Bahn station be extended on the line to Werneuchen. This was prevented by the outbreak of World War II. The only part of the plan to be implemented was the inclusion of the station in the suburban fare zone in 1938.

During World War II, the route was spared for a long time from the fighting. Rail traffic could probably be maintained until mid-April 1945. When German troops retreated from Wriezen, the superstructure was destroyed on several sections, including between the motorway bridge at Blumberg and Ahrensfelde, by rail wolf. The first trains between Berlin-Lichtenberg, Ahrensfelde and Werneuchen ran from 25 November 1945.

With the construction of the new development areas in the district of Marzahn formed in 1979, starting from the Friedrichsfelde Ost S-Bahn station, the S-Bahn was gradually extended to Ahrensfelde. The trains on the Wriezener (long-distance) railway were simultaneously withdrawn. From May 30, 1982, the S-Bahn ended in Ahrensfelde. The station was extensively expanded in advance. A side platform was built for the S-Bahn, and a common island platform was built for trains to Werneuchen and Wriezen. The old mechanical interlocking gave way to a track plan interlocking with relay technology. At the head of the side platform, a new reception building was built. The original plans were to build the building in steel skeleton construction and wall framework. The facades were to be decorated with glass blocks. The location of the building was considered a possible extension of the S-Bahn to the breakpoint Ahrensfelde North. On the southern platforms, a pedestrian bridge was built in 1987 as a second access.

With the summer timetable in 1992, the Deutsche Reichsbahn introduced the hourly rate between Ahrensfelde and Werneuchen. Six pairs of trains crossed Werneuchen every two hours to Wriezen. In order to increase the utilization of the Wriezener Bahn, the Reichsbahn and, from 1994, Deutsche Bahn extended the offer further. Since May 1993, a part ended, since May 1994, all trains back in Berlin-Lichtenberg. In the opposite direction there were now direct connections via Wriezen to Bad Freienwalde (Oder) and Angermünde. With the summer timetable of May 1997, Deutsche Bahn suspended the direct connections to Wriezen. Since May 1998, the section from Tiefensee to Wriezen has been suspended.

Regional trains, originally starting at Lichtenberg, were cut back to start at Ahrensfelde with the commissioning of the S-Bahn to Ahrensfelde on 30 December 1982. Since 1993, the regional trains have continued to Lichtenberg.

== Transport links ==
In addition to Regionalbahn service RB 25 of the Niederbarnimer Eisenbahn, the station is served by line S7 of the Berlin S-Bahn and several bus lines operated by Berliner Verkehrsbetriebe and other regional bus companies.
