= Berlin Frankfurter Allee–Berlin-Rummelsburg railway =

Railway line in Germany

Overview
- Line number: 6140 Frankfurter Allee–Rummelsburg; 6139 Ostkreuz–Lichtenberg
- Locale: Berlin, Germany

Technical
- Line length: 2.7 kilometres (1.7 mi)/1.9 kilometres (1.2 mi)
- Electrification: 15 kV/16.7 Hz AC overhead

The Berlin Frankfurter Allee–Berlin-Rummelsburg railway is an electrified line in Berlin. It connects the Ringbahn with the Berlin-Betriebsbahnhof Rummelsburg station. Except for a short section, the line has two tracks. It was originally created as a freight line, but it is now used primarily used for the transfer of empty passenger trains that are maintained at the Rummelsburg depot. The track is also linked by a double-track line from the Ringbahn from the south to the Berlin-Lichtenberg station.

== Route ==
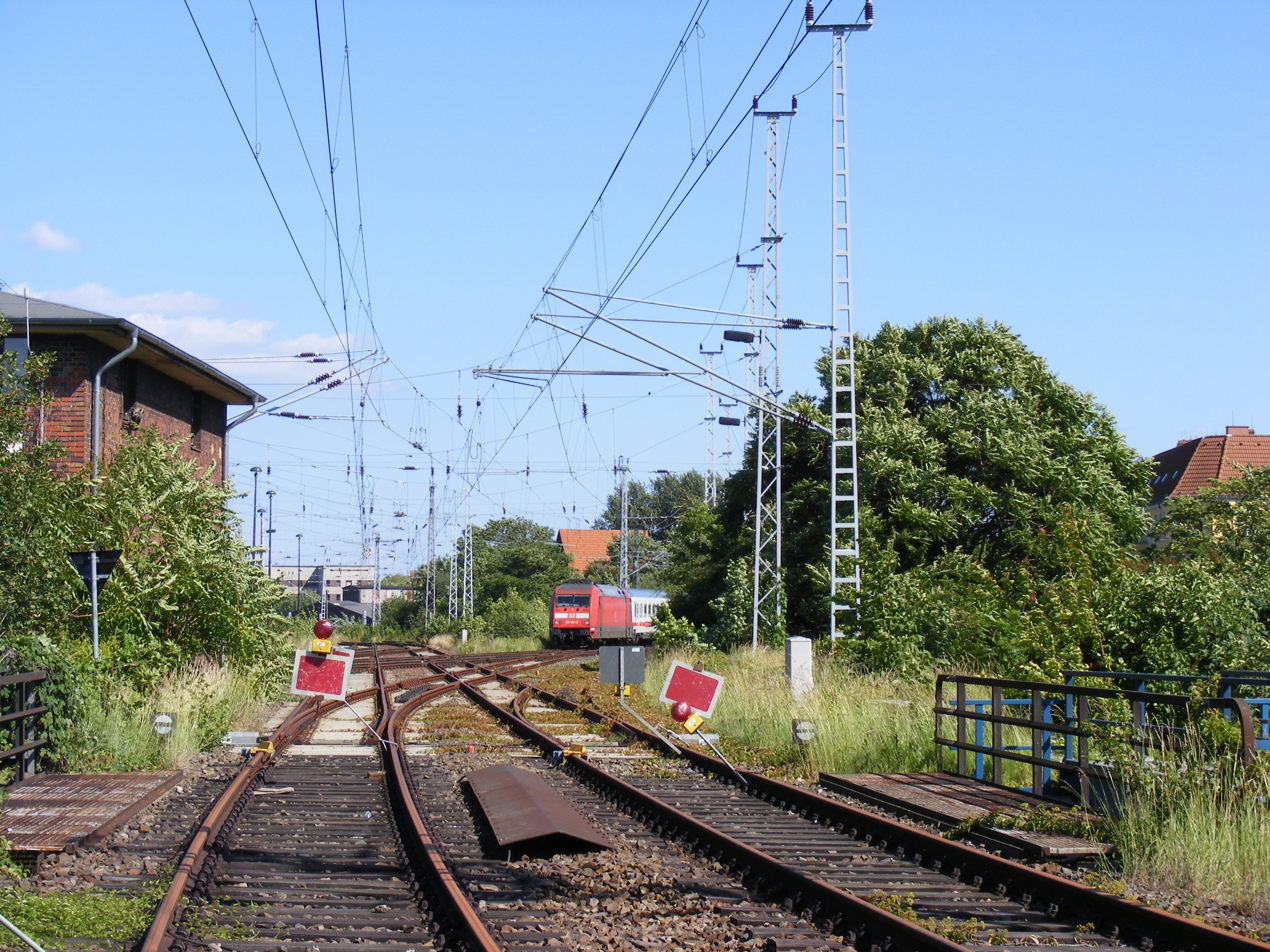
Lichtenberg B1 signalbox (Gabelung junction) with junction of the Frankfurter Allee–Rummelsburg line (right, with train) and the Ostkreuz–Lichtenberg line

The line branches to the east from the long-distance tracks of the Ringbahn at Berlin Frankfurter Allee junction, about 400 metres south of Frankfurter Allee station after the overpass over Gürtelstraße. From there to Rummelsburg, it runs exclusively on embankments, with a total of nine overpasses over roads, paths and two other railway lines.

After about 600 metres, the line, which is elevated on a bridge over the Pfarrstraße, reaches the B1 signalbox at the west end of Berlin-Lichtenberg station. Previously, there was a signalbox at Gabelung junction. Here it intersects with a double-track and electrified line, which is 1.9 km long, coming from the south from Ostkreuz and branching from the Ringbahn at Ostkreuz Nord junction and then it runs to the east to Lichtenberg station. Both links have two tracks.

The line to Rummelsburg extends further to the southeast on the northeastern edge of Victoriastadt. It crosses the Eastern Railway and several streets in the Nöldnerplatze area. Subsequently, it crosses the S-Bahn and the most long-distance tracks of the line to Frankfurt on a bridge. This bridge is the only single-track section of the line. South of the bridge, the track connects with a track that connects the Stadtbahn to the southern part of the Rummelsburg yard. The line runs for another kilometre and ends in the central part of the yard. There is no direct connection with the VnK Railway, which branches east in Rummelsburg.

== History ==
In 1871, the Neuen Verbindungsbahn (new connecting railway) on the Moabit–Stralau–Schöneberg route was built in the eastern part of the city, creating the first part of the Ringbahn around Berlin, which was initially intended primarily for freight traffic. The Ringbahn was completed in 1877. At the same time further important freight customers were established in the area of the Ringbahn, such as the Zentralvieh- und Schlachthof (“central cattle and slaughterhouse”) north of Frankfurter Allee. At the same time, new marshalling yards were built outside the former city of Berlin, such as the Lichtenberg-Friedrichsfelde (now Berlin-Lichtenberg) marshalling yard of the Eastern Railway and at the Rummelsburg bei Berlin (now Berlin-Rummelsburg) marshalling yard of the Niederschlesisch-Märkische railway. Thus, a connection of these two line to the Ringbahn was necessary. In 1879, the two links from Friedrichsberg (now Frankfurter Allee) and Stralau (now Ostkreuz) were completed to Lichtenberg-Friedrichsfelde and Rummelsburg and double-tracked in 1880. The lines were also known as the Gleisschleife (or Gleise-Schleife) Rummelsburg (Rummelsburg loop line or lines). The line was used primarily for freight. They contributed to the growing traffic on the Ringbahn, which was therefore expanded to four tracks in this area from 1880 to 1882, with separate passenger and freight tracks.

=== After 1945 ===
After the Second World War and the division of Germany and Berlin, Berlin-Lichtenberg station became one of the main stations in Berlin for passengers, especially after the construction of the Berlin Wall in 1961. In the late 1950s, the Berlin outer ring emerged and the main responsibility for passenger service was transferred to Lichtenberg. Because, on the one hand, the outer ring often reached its capacity limits and, on the other hand, some through trains running in north–south direction reversed in Lichtenberg, a few express trains ran from Lichtenberg on the Ringbahn and therefore used a section of this link.

The Frankfurter Allee container terminal was especially important for freight transport. Some freight trains ran via the link and Lichtenberg to the outer ring. Some trains terminating in Berlin-Lichtenberg ran over the link to carriage yards in this area. After the Second World War, there was a wagon washing facility at the central slaughterhouse and empty freight wagons were transferred from Rummelsburg three times a day for washing.

In December 1984, electrification was completed on the Ringbahn from the south to Frankfurter Allee and on the two link railways.

=== After 1990 ===
After German reunification, traffic flows in passenger transport changed. In 1990, the very heavy traffic that formerly ran through Berlin in the north–south direction decreased significantly. In addition, rail freight traffic declined. The Frankfurter Allee container terminal was closed in late 1999. The central slaughterhouse was closed in 1991 and the former Berlin-Pankow marshalling yard was closed in 1997. Several years later the connection in Pankow to the north was reinstated. With the re-opening of the Berlin Stadtbahn for long-distance transport, Lichtenberg station became even less important. This has had significant consequences for the links from Rummelsburg and Lichtenberg to the Ringbahn. The traffic to Rummelsburg even ceased completely.

Since 2004, the connection towards Ostkreuz has been blocked because of the preparations for the redevelopment of the station. There remained only limited freight from Lichtenberg to Greifswalder Straße freight yard.

Since the completion of the new Berlin Hauptbahnhof and the north–south mainline, several long-distance trains heading south begin and end in Berlin-Gesundbrunnen station. These trains are maintained at the Rummelsburg depot. To transfer these trains from Gesundbrunnen to Rummelsburg it was necessary to restore the line from Frankfurter Allee to Rummelsburg. The track was renovated from 2004 to 2006. The viaduct over the line to Frankfurt in Rummelsburg was replaced by a single-track structure, which was completed in late 2005. There will be new traffic on the link to Ostkreuz from the mid-2010s after the restoration of the regional platform there. Then regional traffic will be routed along this line.

=== Passenger traffic ===
Scheduled passenger services have only used the links since the 1950s and only to and from Lichtenberg, never to and from Rummelsburg. Part of Berlin-Lichtenberg station was used by long-distance trains using the connection to the Ringbahn. This included both trains heading north (especially to Schwerin), which used the Ringbahn to Schönhauser Allee and ran via Pankow to Karow Cross and trains heading south via Berlin-Schöneweide station to Grünau Cross.

In 1985, some passenger trains from locations on the northern Berlin outer ring to Lichtenberg station were extended in the peak hour over the link towards Ostkreuz and Schöneweide. Although this connection was abandoned in 1990 soon after Die Wende, Regionalbahn services repeatedly ran on this section in the years up to 2003.

There have been occasional passenger services from Lichtenberg to the northern Ringbahn since 2006. In the 2009 timetable, it was used by a scheduled pair of services in the summer season from Berlin-Lichtenberg to Rheinsberg. There are also some night trains on the line.
