= Alt-Hohenschönhausen =

- Quarter of Berlin
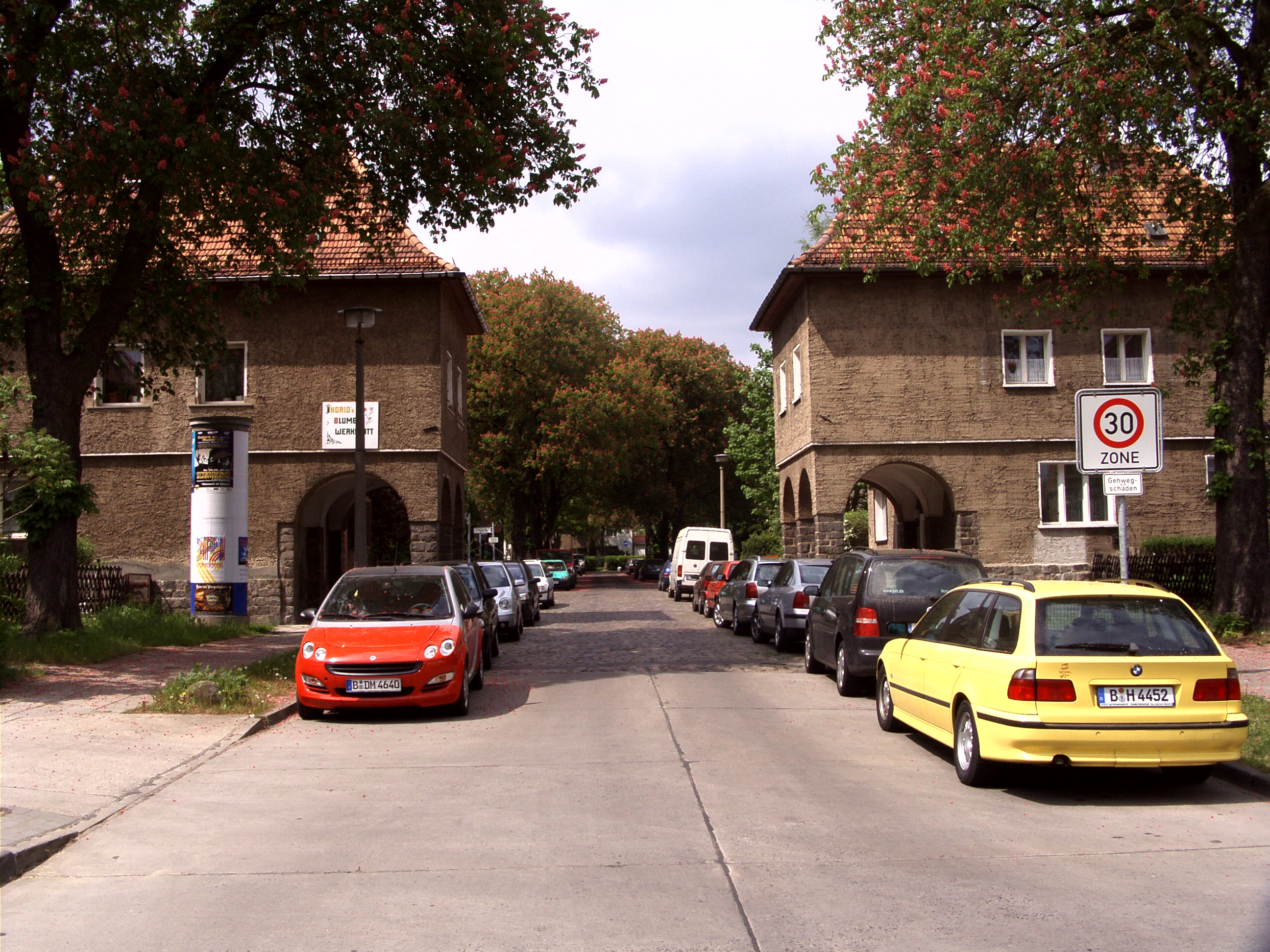
- Bruno-Taut-Siedlung

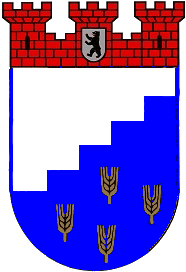
- Coat of arms

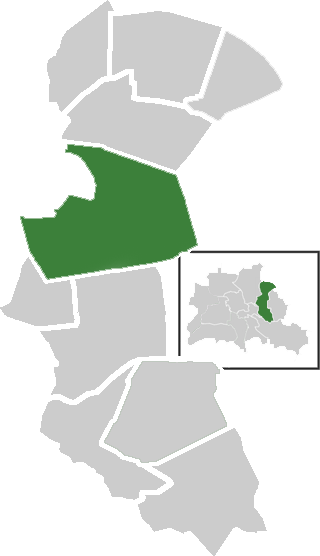
- Location of Alt-Hohenschönhausen in Lichtenberg borough and Berlin
- Interactive map of Alt-Hohenschönhausen
- Location within Germany Location within Berlin
- Coordinates: 52°35′55″N 13°30′27″E
- Country: Germany
- State: Berlin
- City: Berlin
- Borough: Lichtenberg
- Subdivisions: 8 zones

Area
  - Total: 9.33 km^{2} (3.60 sq mi)
- Elevation: 52 m (171 ft)

Population (2024-12-31)
  - Total: 53,086
  - Density: 5,690/km^{2} (14,700/sq mi)
- Time zone: UTC+01:00 (CET)
  - Summer (DST): UTC+02:00 (CEST)
- Postal codes: 13053, 13055
- Vehicle registration: B

Alt-Hohenschönhausen (German: [ˈalt ˌhoːənˌʃøːnˈhaʊ̯zn̩], lit. 'Old Hohenschönhausen') is a locality (Ortsteil) in the borough (Bezirk) of Lichtenberg, Berlin. Known also as Hohenschönhausen it was, until 2001, the main and the eponymous locality of the former Hohenschönhausen borough. In 2023, the population was about 51,000.

== History ==
=== Early history ===
The earliest evidence of settlement in Alt-Hohenschönhausen are from the Bronze Age, and when the settlement history of the wider Berlin area is taken into consideration, there could have been settlements there since 10,000BC. Alt-Hohenschönhausen was first mentioned in 1230. In the initial centuries of the Common Era the area was mainly inhabited by the Sprevane and Hevelli tribes. By the 13th century the area had been colonised by Germans, particularly from the settlement of Schönhausen, during the eastward migration and settlement of Germans in the medieval period. By the 14th century, the prefix Hoh (high) was added to the name of the village to distinguish itself from the southerly village of Niederschönhausen. The first definitive written record of Hohenschönhausen is from an official certificate to Conradus de Schonehusen, dated 19 August 1284.

=== Effects of War ===
==== Thirty Years' War ====
From 1626 Hohenschönhausen was affected by the Thirty Years' War. Apart from the Swedish forces who were passing through the area, the troops of Albrecht von Wallenstein also plundered the area and its surroundings, with only the village church remaining undamaged. The result of this was a large-scale desertion of the area by its inhabitants and widespread famine. In the following years, The Plague and other epidemics were reported, including a plague of locusts in 1651. As a result of these factors, the village had lost 58% of its inhabitants by the mid-17th century.

==== Seven Years' War and Industrialisation ====
Hohenschönhausen was affected by the Seven Years' War, and was plundered by Austrian and Russian troops after Frederick the Great's defeat at the Battle of Kunersdorf. From 1817 the village and the surrounding estates were under the control of the local state councillor, Christian Friedrich Scharnweber. Under his tenure and those of his successors, Hohenschönhausen began expanding along the road to Berlin (German: Berliner Weg), today's Konrad-Wolf-Straße. Apart from the settlements, at this point cereals were also widely grown and, after the easing of restrictions in 1810, milled on-site. As the 19th century progressed and Germany began to industrialise, Hohenschönhausen benefitted from investment in infrastructure, such as the opening of an electric tram line to Berlin in 1899, and a brewery which opened in the early 1890s.

=== Weimar Republic and Nazi Germany ===
==== Amalgamation with Berlin ====
With the Greater Berlin Act of October 1920, Alt-Hohenschönhausen officially became incorporated as part of Greater Berlin within the Weißensee district. Along with the rest of the city, Hohenschönhausen saw food and housing shortages throughout the financial crisis of the mid-1920s.

==== Nazi Germany ====
The district was broadly left-wing in the early 1930s; when the Nazi Party took power in 1933, the majority of residents were members of the social democratic parties, the USPD and the SPD. Nevertheless, more than 100 local civil servants were replaced by officials more favourable to the Party on 7 April 1933. After the pogroms of Kristallnacht on 9 November 1938, only some isolated Jews were still allowed to carry out their business, among them was Hohenschönhausen doctor Victor Aronstein, whose waiting room served as a secret meeting place for communists and social democrats until 1939. In 1938 the district's synagogue was completely destroyed by the Nazis; its location is now the site of a memorial to the persecuted Jews of Hohenschönhausen.

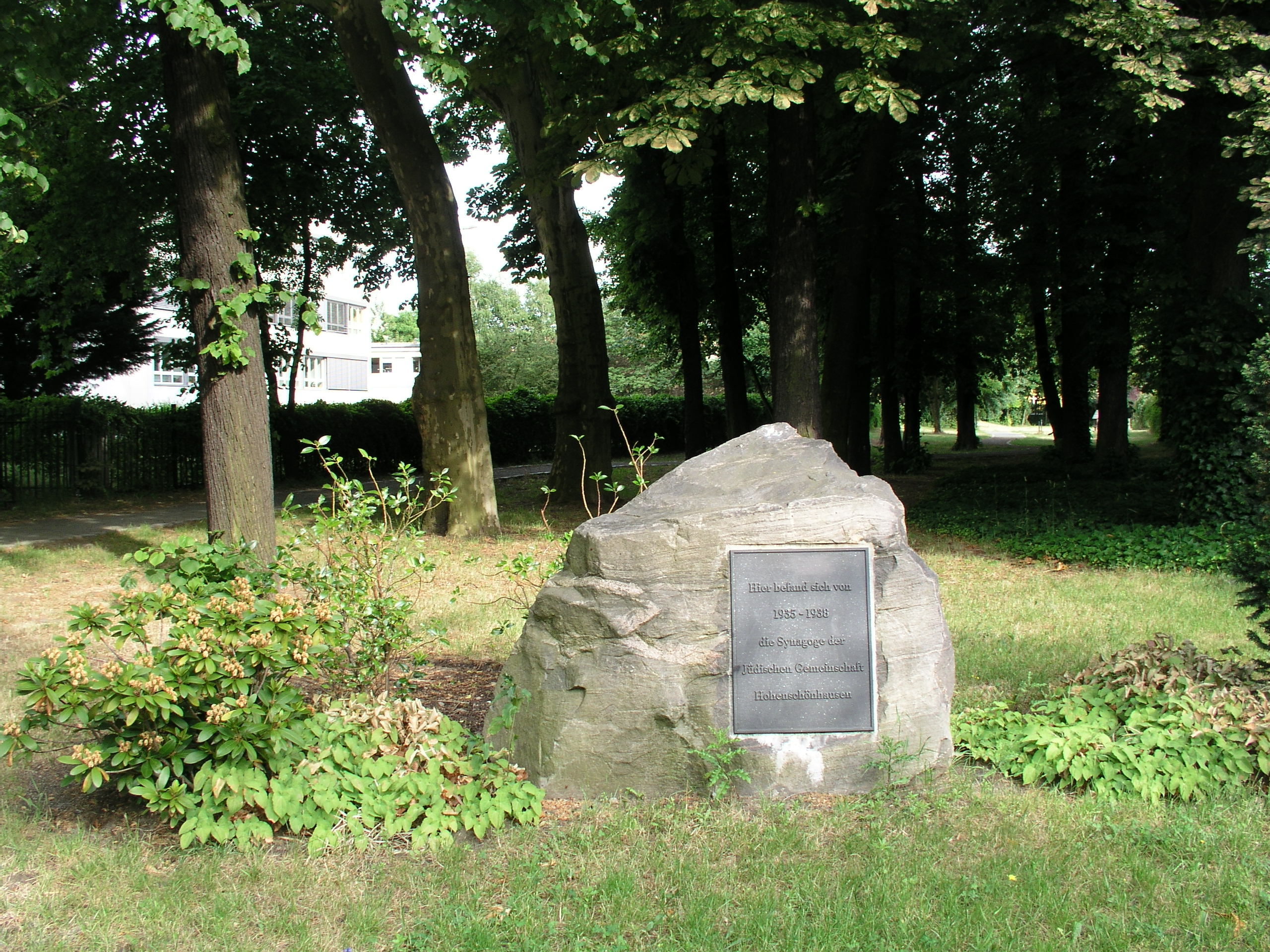
A plaque commemorating Hohenschönhausen's synagogue, which was destroyed by the Nazis in 1938

=== Post-war History ===
==== Capitulation ====
Together with Wartenberg, Falkenberg and Marzahn, Hohenschönhausen was one of the first parts of Greater Berlin to be capitulated by the Red Army in the evening of 21 April 1945. Like most of Berlin, the immediate problems facing the area included outbreaks of Typhus and Shigellosis, a lack of gas and electricity, and widespread homelessness and orphancy. By the end of the summer of 1945, schools had re-opened and Hohenschönhausen Castle began functioning as a hospital, which continued until 1989. At around the same time, the Soviet secret police took over a building in an industrial area formerly occupied by the Nazi welfare organisation, the NSV, and converted into use as a detainment and transit camp for prisoners of war, which continued to be used until the beginning of the fall of the German Democratic Republic in 1989.

==== Hohenschönhausen as part of the GDR ====
On 18 June 1953 more than 1,000 residents of Alt-Hohenschönhausen took part in the mass uprising which spread throughout the country. Like most of the country, the district saw a reduction in its population up until 1961 when the Berlin Wall was built. In the 1970s the district was expanded with the construction of new high-rise apartment buildings. Thanks to the secretive nature of the prison in Hohenschönhausen, a large part of the district where the facility was located was left blank on official maps.

=== Post-1989 History ===
After Die Wende in 1989, East and West Berlin merged to form the federal state of Berlin in 1990. On 1 January 2001 the former borough of Hohenschönhausen, consisting of Alt-Hohenschönhausen as well as the localities Neu-Hohenschönhausen, Malchow, Wartenberg and Falkenberg, was merged with the borough of Lichtenberg into the contemporary borough of Lichtenberg.

== Geography ==
=== Position ===
Alt-Hohenschönhausen is situated on the Barnim Plateau in the northeast of Berlin. It borders on the localities of Neu-Hohenschönhausen, Lichtenberg, Fennpfuhl, Marzahn (in Marzahn-Hellersdorf borough) and Weißensee (in Pankow borough).

=== Subdivision ===
The district is divided into 8 zones (Viertel):

- Dorfkern
- Gartenstadt
- Märkisches Viertel
- Siedlung Dingelstädter Straße
- Siedlung Malchower Weg
- Villenviertel am Oranksee
- Weiße Taube
- Wilhelmsberg

== Culture ==
Hohenschönhausen Castle is located in Alt-Hohenschönhausen. The Association Hohenschönhausen Castle cares for the restoration and cultural revitalization of this manor house and regularly organizes different events in the castle, such as exhibitions, readings, and concerts.

== Transport ==
=== Personal transport ===
The road network in Alt-Hohenschönhausen focuses mainly on some of the historic major roads of the Berlin network, such as Main Street (Hauptstraße) and Konrad Wolf Street (Konrad-Wolf-Straße). According to some estimates, daily traffic on some of the busiest roads in the area can reach 32,000 movements.

=== Public transport ===
The district is served by the M4, M5, M6, 16, M17 and 27 lines of the Berlin tram network and by the S-Bahn stations Berlin Gehrenseestraße (S75 line) and Berlin Hohenschönhausen (S75 + DB).

== Photo gallery ==
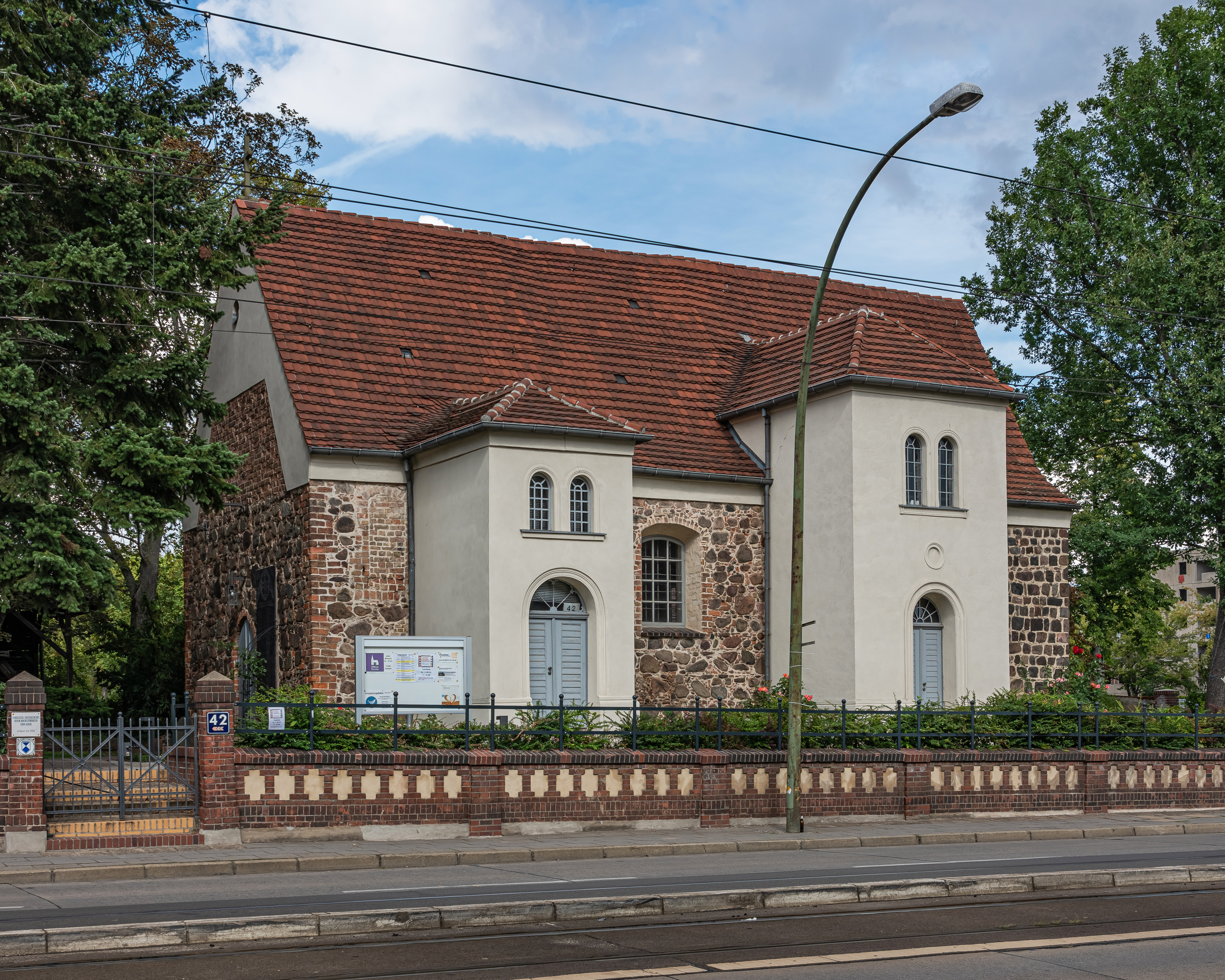
Protestant Tabor Church on the Hauptstraße

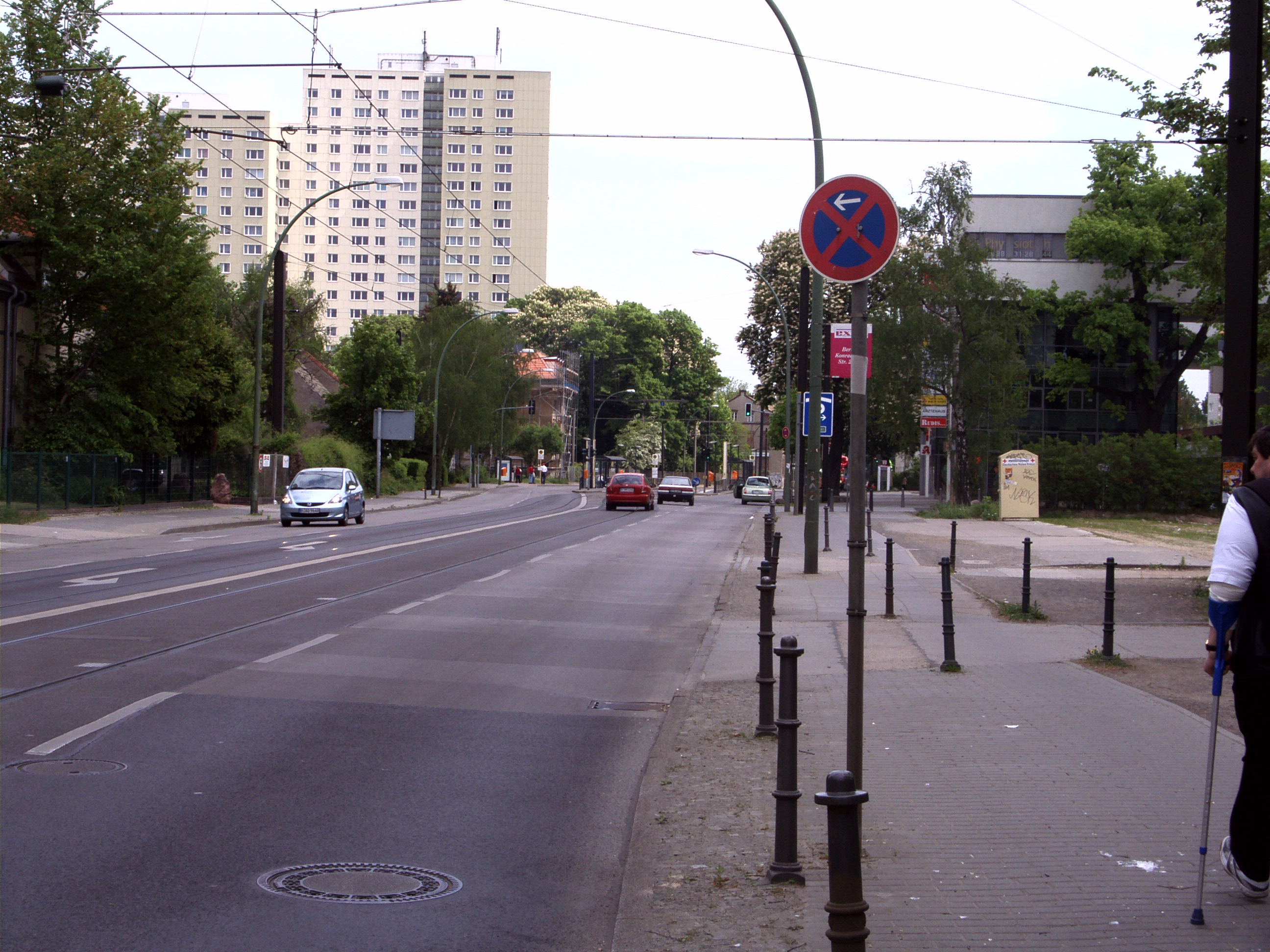
Hauptstraße
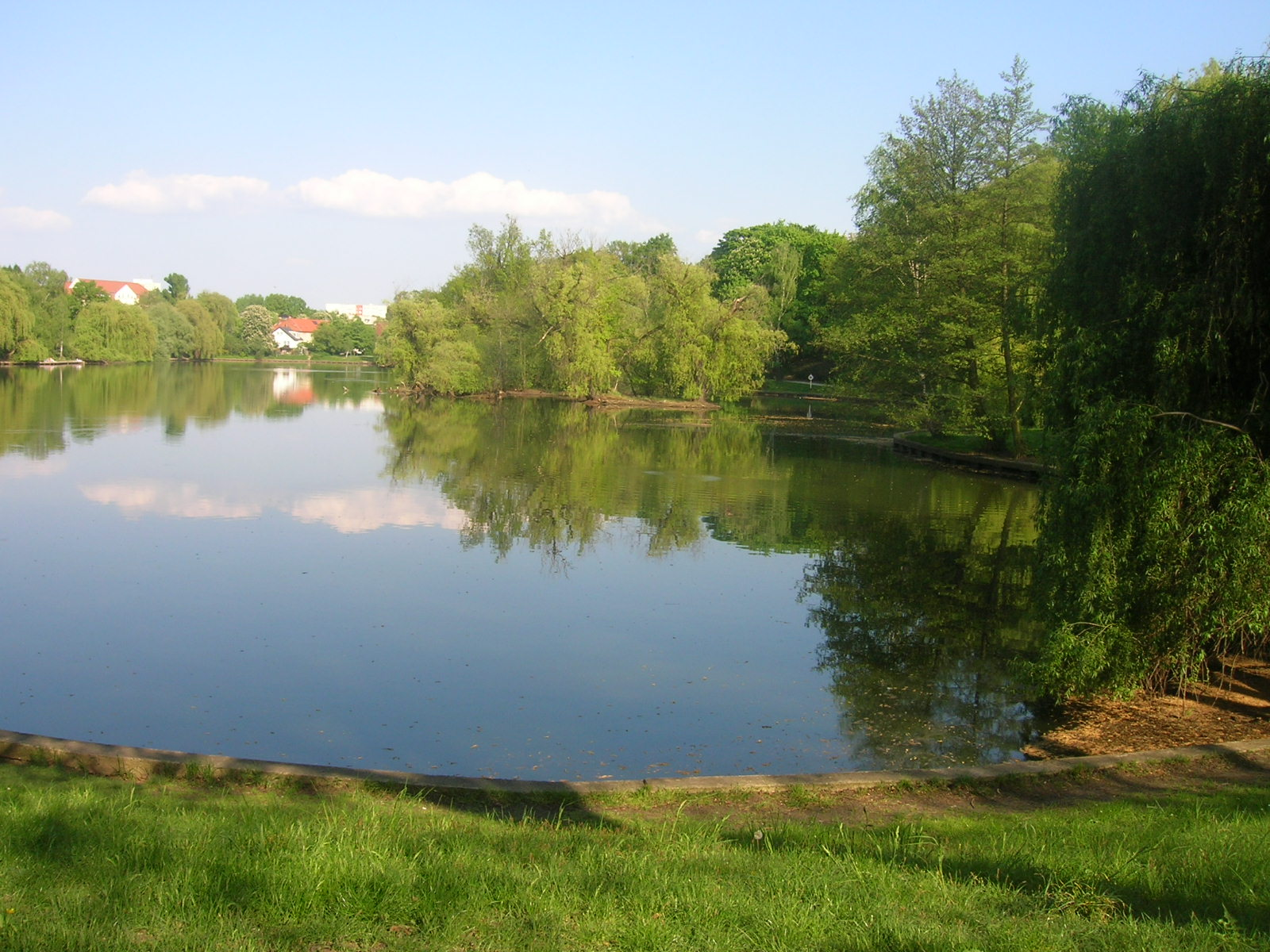
The Obersee lake

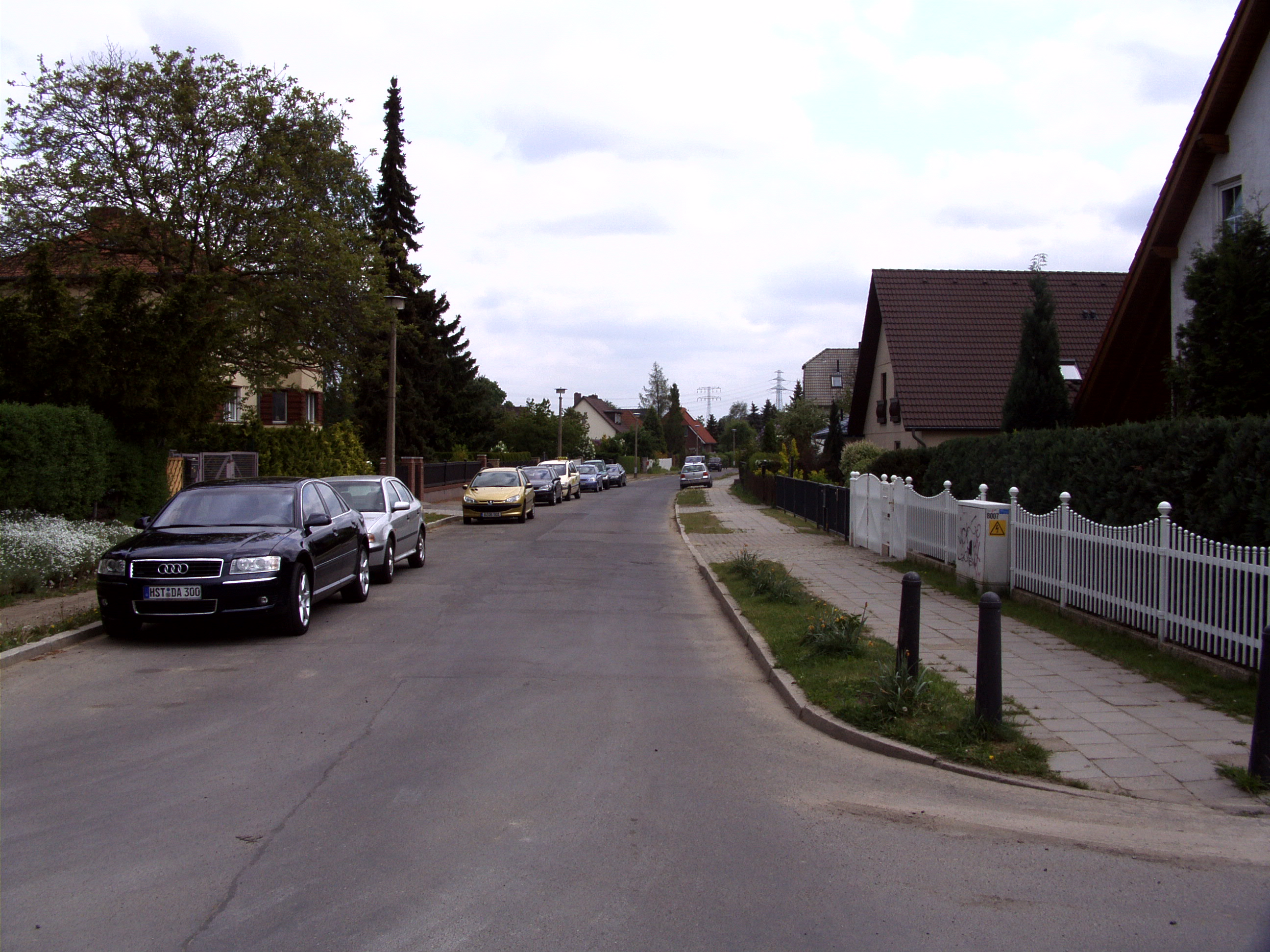
Gottfriedstraße in Gartenstadt

The Siedlung Flusspferdhof

== See also ==
- Berlin-Hohenschönhausen Memorial
