= Berlin-Lichtenberg station =

Railway station in Berlin, Germany

Berlin-Lichtenberg
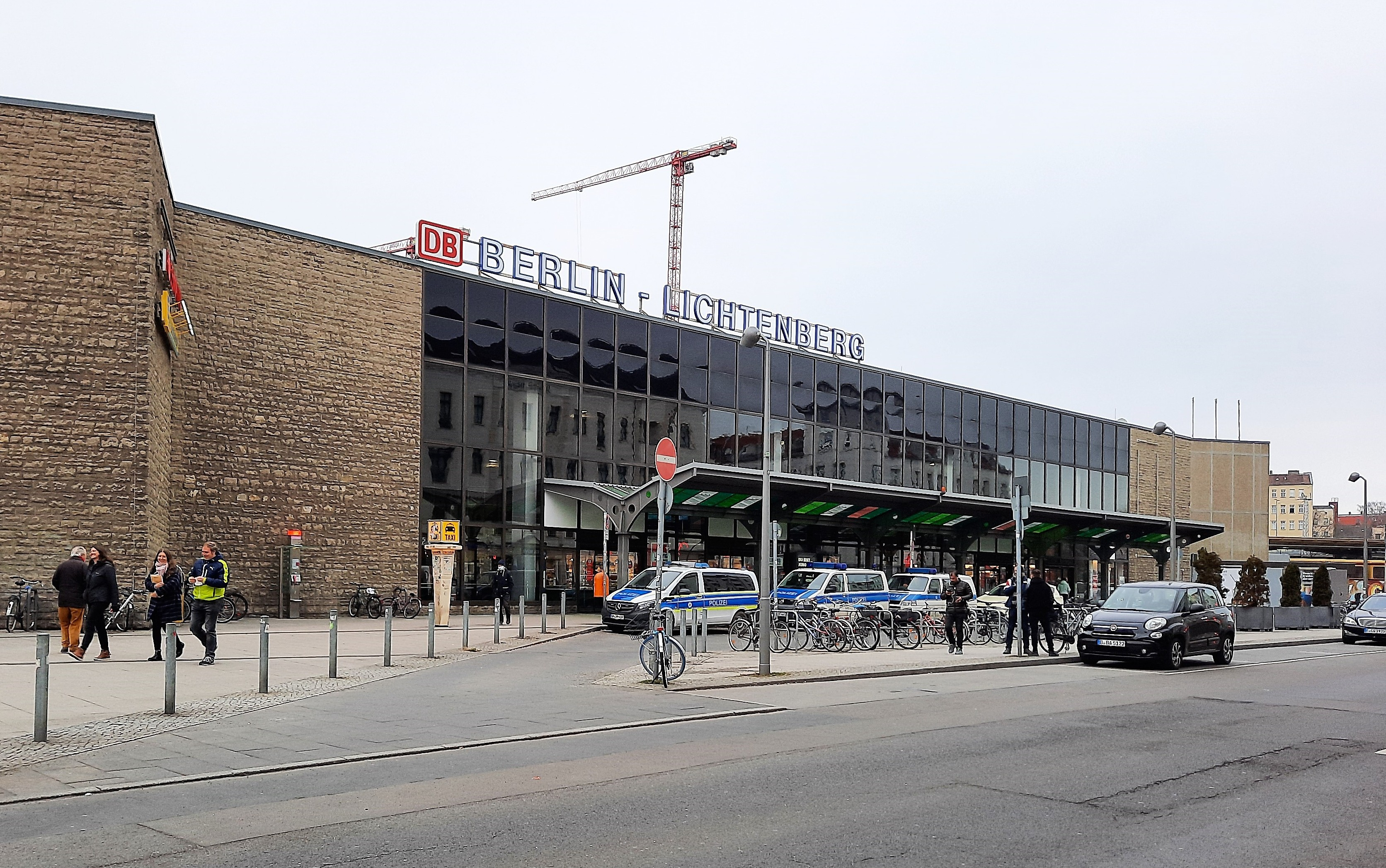
- Entrance hall

General information
- Location: Weitlingstraße 22; Lichtenberg, Berlin; Germany
- Coordinates: 52°30′38″N 13°29′47″E
- Operator: DB Station&Service
- Lines: Eastern Railway; Wriezen Railway; Berlin Frankfurter Allee–Berlin-Rummelsburg railway
- Platforms: 4
- Tracks: 8
- Connections: 108 240 256 296 396 N5 N50 N94

Other information
- Station code: 549
- DS100 code: BLO
- IBNR: 10036
- Category: 2
- Fare zone: : Berlin B/5656
- Website: www.bahnhof.de

History
- Opened: 1881
Services
Preceding station	DB Fernverkehr	Following station
Berlin Gesundbrunnen towards Berlin Hbf	EC 95	Frankfurt (Oder) towards Warszawa Wschodnia or Gdynia Główna
Berlin Gesundbrunnen towards Berlin Hbf	EC 96	Frankfurt (Oder) towards Przemyśl Główny
Preceding station	DB Regio Nordost	Following station
Berlin Ostkreuz towards Wünsdorf-Waldstadt	RB 24	Berlin-Hohenschönhausen towards Eberswalde Hbf
Berlin Ostkreuz towards Ludwigsfelde	RB 32	Berlin-Hohenschönhausen towards Oranienburg
Terminus	IRE Kulturzug	Berlin Ostkreuz towards Wroclaw Glowny
Preceding station	Niederbarnimer Eisenbahn	Following station
Berlin Ostkreuz Terminus	RB 12	Berlin-Hohenschönhausen towards Templin Stadt
Berlin Ostkreuz Terminus	RB 25	Ahrensfelde towards Werneuchen
Berlin Ostkreuz Terminus	RB 26	Berlin-Mahlsdorf towards Kostrzyn
Terminus	TES	Erkner towards Fangschleuse Tesla Süd
Preceding station	Berlin S-Bahn	Following station
Nöldnerplatz towards Westkreuz	S5	Friedrichsfelde Ost towards Strausberg Nord
Nöldnerplatz towards Potsdam Hbf	S7	Friedrichsfelde Ost towards Ahrensfelde
Nöldnerplatz towards Warschauer Straße	S75	Friedrichsfelde Ost towards Wartenberg
Preceding station	Berlin U-Bahn	Following station
Magdalenenstraße towards Berlin Hbf	U5	Friedrichsfelde towards Hönow
Location

Berlin-Lichtenberg is a railway station in Berlin, Germany. It is located on the Eastern Railway, Wriezen Railway and Berlin Frankfurter Allee–Berlin-Rummelsburg railway lines in the Lichtenberg district. The station is also part of the Berlin S-Bahn and U-Bahn (U5 line) network.

During the division of the city, Lichtenberg with its extended railyards became the central transport facility of East Berlin, together with Berlin Ostbahnhof. Today, the station mainly provides regional rail service to the eastern and northern environs.

== Overview ==
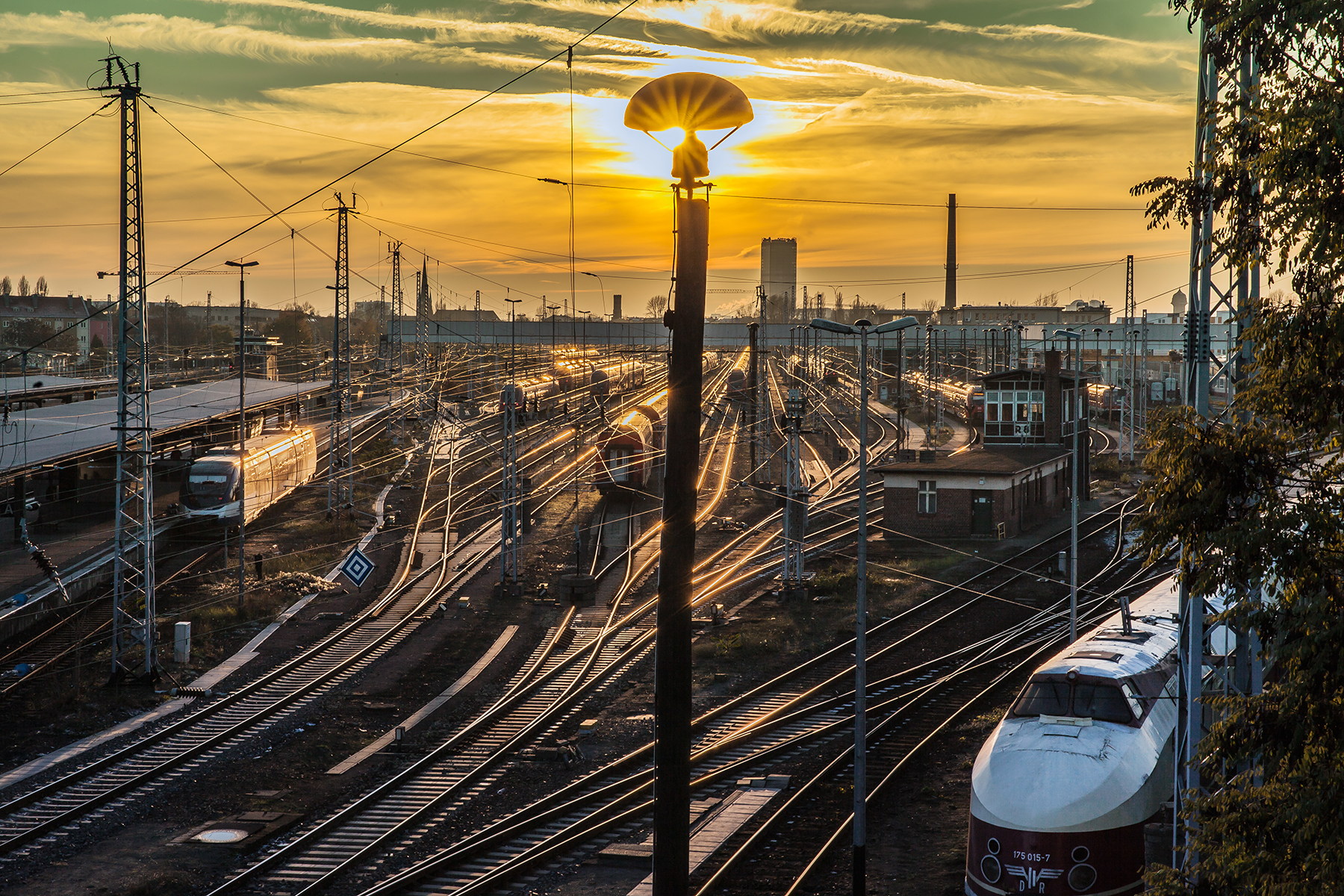
Railway tracks, view from Lichtenberger Brücke

The station building marks the southeastern border of the Lichtenberg quarter and is primarily accessible from the Weitlingstraße neighbourhood in the adjacent Rummelsburg locality. North of it, the Frankfurter Allee, part of the Bundesstraße 1/5 highway, crosses the tracks on the eight-lane Lichtenberger Brücke (Lichtenberg Bridge).

Until 2006, international trains to Kaliningrad, Warsaw, Kyiv, Minsk, Moscow and Siberia (among others Omsk, Novosibirsk and Kazakhstan) used to stop at Berlin-Lichtenberg. However, after the completion of Berlin Hauptbahnhof, these trains now stop there. Night trains from all parts of Germany still terminate at this station, however, as do some trains from Warsaw and Kraków.

Lichtenberg was featured in the opening scene of the 2007 movie The Bourne Ultimatum where it was made to look like a Moscow train station.

== History ==
Following the opening of the Prussian Eastern Railway line to Strausberg and Küstrin in 1867 and the first sections of the Berlin Ringbahn at nearby Ostkreuz station in 1871, the first marshalling yard at the site was laid out in the 1870s. Passenger trains stopped here from 1881 onwards; the station was renamed Lichtenberg-Friedrichsfelde the next year. Long-distance trains, however, ran via Schlesischer Bahnhof (the present-day Ostbahnhof) to the central Berlin Stadtbahn line. The Wriezen Railway branch-off was opened in 1898.

After the area was incorporated into Berlin by the 1920 Greater Berlin Act, Lichtenberg received access to the electrified S-Bahn commuter rail network in 1928. The subway station, built in the New Objectivity style according to plans designed by Alfred Grenander, was opened on 21 December 1930. Zentralfriedhof ('Central Cemetery') was then added to the name; from 1935 the station was called "Bahnhof Lichtenberg". During World War II, it served as an air raid shelter. Train services ceased during the Battle of Berlin on 23 April 1945, but were resumed only a month later under Soviet occupation.

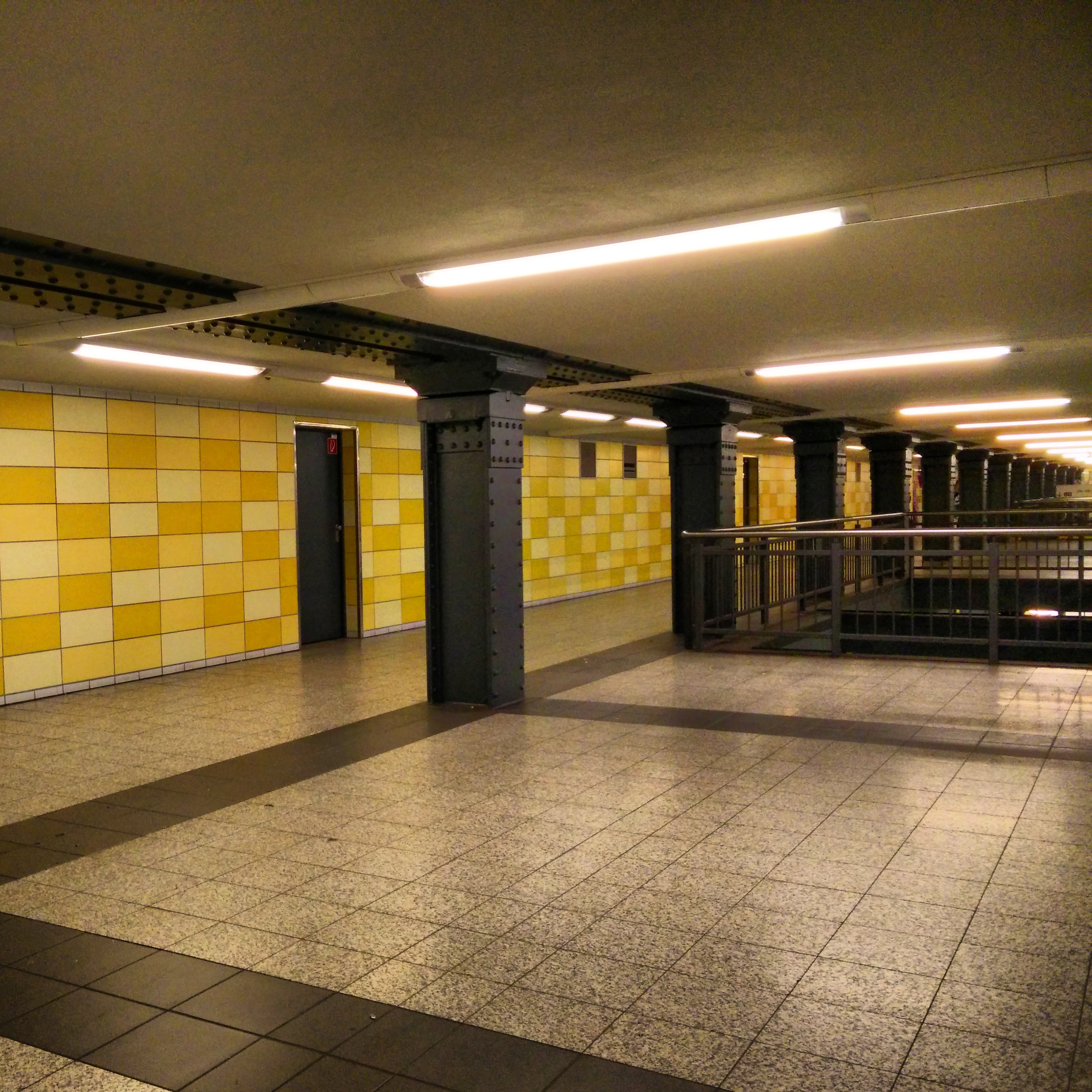
Passenger tunnel

After the war, the Deutsche Reichsbahn authority had Lichtenberg gradually rebuilt as the main train station of East Berlin, providing direct connections with the Ringbahn line and the Berlin outer ring. An additional platform for suburban trains was opened in 1952, accessible via a passenger tunnel above the U-Bahn tracks which has only a ceiling height of 2.25 m (7 ft 5 in). The track system was extensively remodeled with the construction of the Lichtenberger Brücke viaduct from 1972 to 1976. A new entrance hall was inaugurated on 15 December 1982.

Since German reunification, Lichtenberg station has declined in importance, mainly with the opening of the Berlin North-South mainline in 2006. Nevertheless, large parts of the facilities have been restored and modernised in recent years.

== Train services ==
The station was served by the following services in 2026:

Line	Route	Interval
RB 12	Templin – Löwenberg – Oranienburg – Berlin-Lichtenberg – Berlin Ostkreuz	60 min
RB 24	Eberswalde – Biesenthal – Bernau – Berlin-Lichtenberg – Berlin Ostkreuz – Berlin-Schöneweide – BER Airport – Blankenfelde – Dahlewitz – Rangsdorf – Dabendorf – Zossen – Wünsdorf-Waldstadt	60 min
RB 25	Werneuchen – Blumberg – Ahrensfelde – Berlin-Lichtenberg – Berlin Ostkreuz	60 min
RB 26	Berlin-Lichtenberg – Berlin-Mahlsdorf – Müncheberg – Kostrzyn	60 min
RB 32	Oranienburg – Berlin-Lichtenberg – Berlin Ostkreuz – Berlin-Schöneweide – BER Airport – Birkengrund – Ludwigsfelde	60 min
RB 54	Berlin-Lichtenberg – Oranienburg – Rheinsberg	One train
IRE; Kulturzug	Berlin-Lichtenberg – Berlin Ostkreuz – Cottbus – Wrocław Główny	One train Sa+Su
TES	Berlin-Lichtenberg – Erkner – Fangschleuse Tesla Süd	One train
