= Lichtenberg (locality) =

- Quarter of Berlin
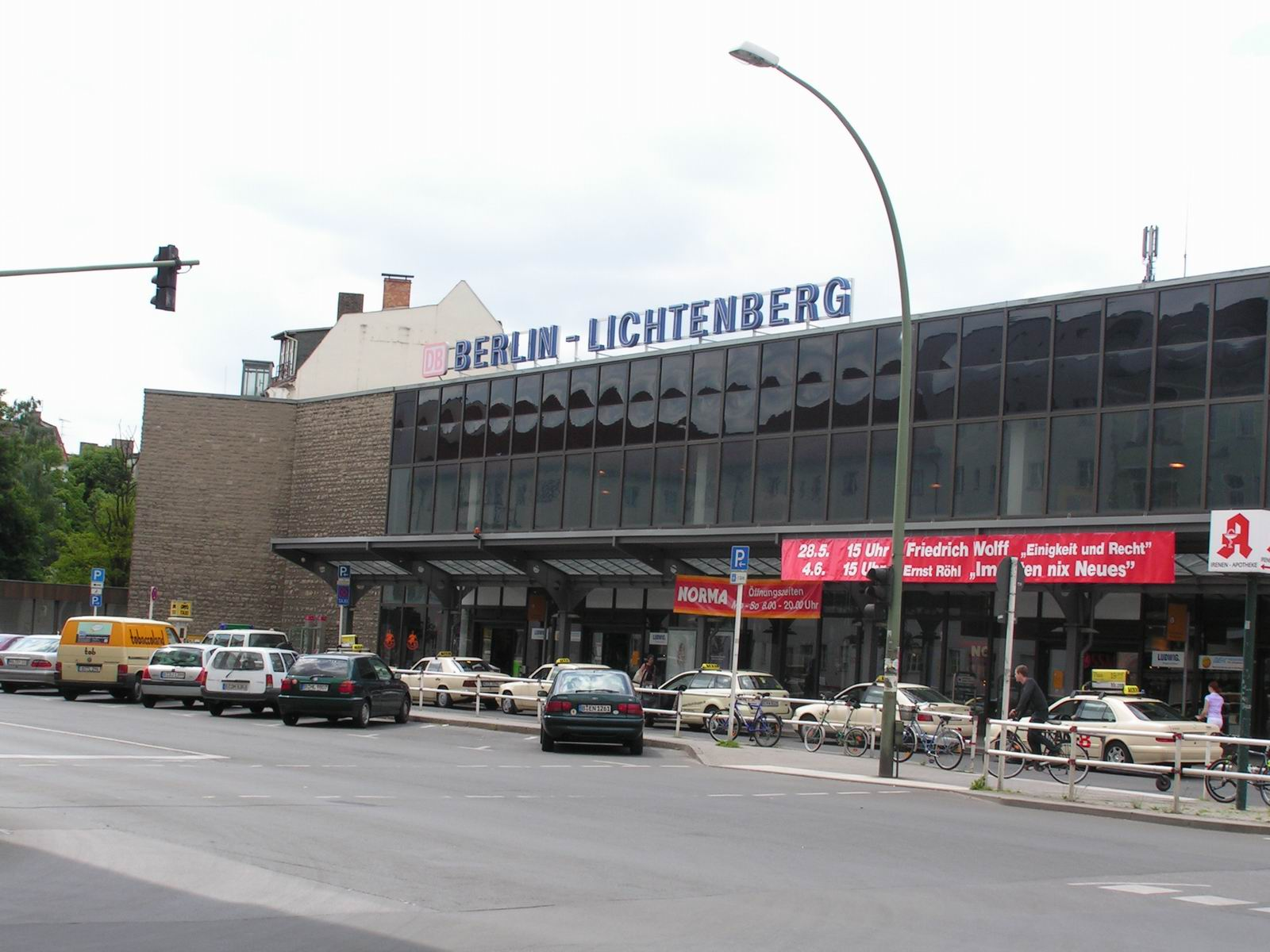
- Lichtenberg railway station

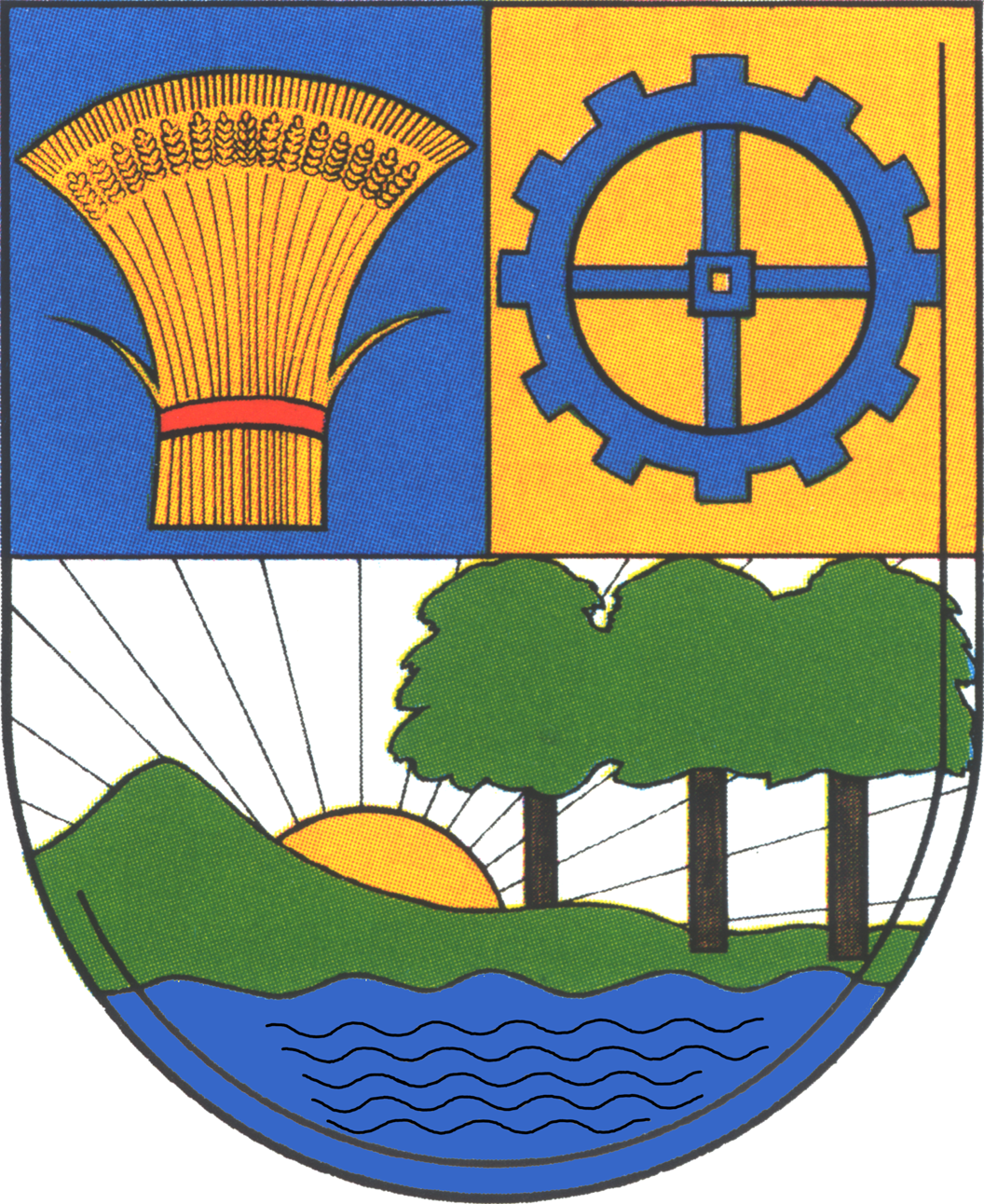
- Coat of arms

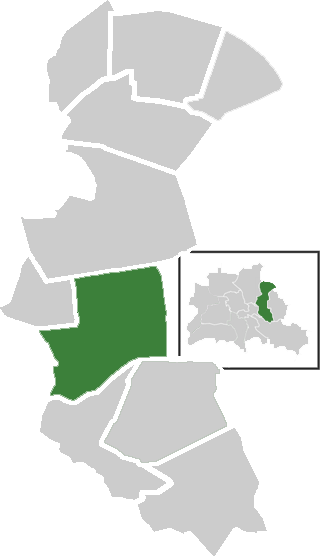
- Location of Lichtenberg in Lichtenberg district and Berlin
- Interactive map of Lichtenberg
- Location within Germany Location within Berlin
- Coordinates: 52°31′16″N 13°28′48″E
- Country: Germany
- State: Berlin
- City: Berlin
- Borough: Lichtenberg, Berlin
- Founded: 1230

Area
  - Total: 7.22 km^{2} (2.79 sq mi)
- Elevation: 52 m (171 ft)

Population (2024-12-31)
  - Total: 44,837
  - Density: 6,210/km^{2} (16,100/sq mi)
- Time zone: UTC+01:00 (CET)
  - Summer (DST): UTC+02:00 (CEST)
- Postal codes: 10365, 10367
- Vehicle registration: B

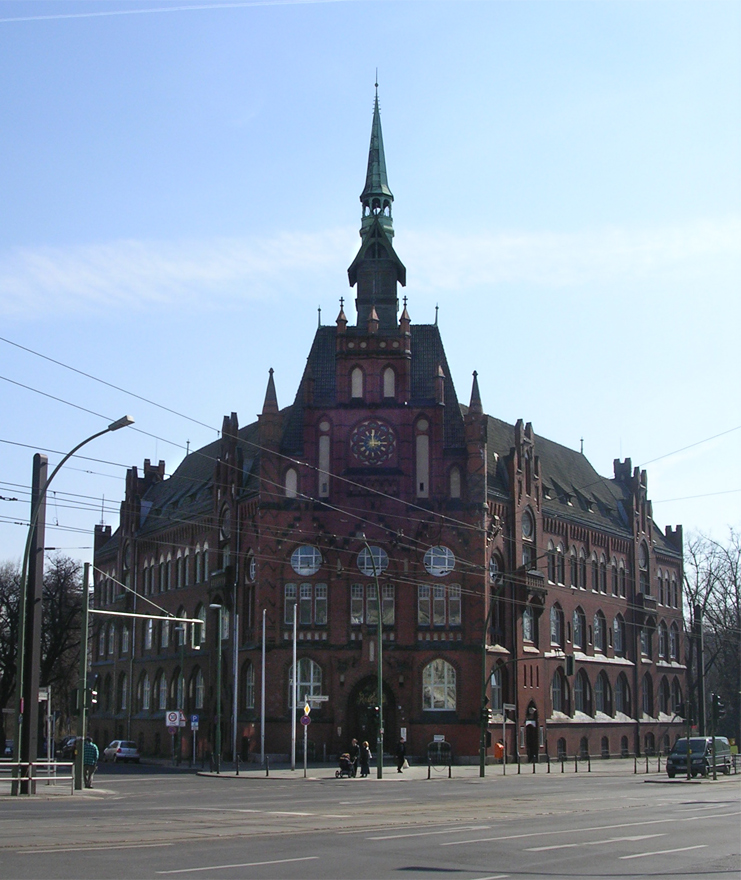
The Neo Gothic city hall

Lichtenberg (German: [ˈlɪçtn̩bɛʁk]) is a quarter (Ortsteil) of Berlin in the homonymous borough (Bezirk) of Lichtenberg. Until 2001 it was an autonomous district with the localities of Fennpfuhl, Rummelsburg, Friedrichsfelde and Karlshorst.

== History ==
The historic village of Lichtenberg, today also called Alt-Lichtenberg, was founded about 1230, due to the German colonization of the territory of Barnim. The settlement around the fieldstone church was first mentioned in a 1288 deed, its estates were acquired by the neighbouring City of Berlin in 1391.

Alt-Lichtenberg suffered severely during the Thirty Years' War and remained a small village at the Berlin gates until in the late 18th century Prussian noblemen like general Wichard Joachim Heinrich von Möllendorf built their residences here. In 1815 the Lichtenberg estate became a property of the Prussian chancellor Karl August von Hardenberg.

The village came to be a residential area and a suburb of Berlin from the mid 19th century on. A new town hall was erected in 1898 and in 1907 Lichtenberg received town privileges. Originally an independent city, it became part of Berlin in 1920 in the Greater Berlin Act.

== Geography ==
Lichtenberg is located in the middle of its District. It borders with Friedrichshain (in Friedrichshain-Kreuzberg), Prenzlauer Berg (in Pankow), Fennpfuhl, Alt-Hohenschönhausen, Rummelsburg, Friedrichsfelde and Marzahn (in Marzahn-Hellersdorf). It has an area of 7.22 square kilometres (2.79 sq mi).

== Transportation ==
The locality is served by the Berlin S-Bahn lines S5, S7, S75 at its main railway station Berlin Lichtenberg, periodically used as terminal for international trains to eastern Europe, as for example the "Sibirjak". Lichtenberg station is also a stop on the U-Bahn line U5, which in addition serves Magdalenenstraße. Furthermore, the locality is crossed by several lines of the tramway.

Berlin's main arterial road to the east, the Frankfurter Allee, part of the Bundesstrasse 1 and 5, runs through Lichtenberg.

== Berlin's Asiatown in the East ==
Lichtenberg is a developing center of Asian culture and dubbed the eastern Asiatown or Chinatown of Berlin. The Dong Xuan Center around Herzbergstrasse on former industrial grounds is a development quarter with many different Asian businesses, various shops, food producers and wholesalers/distributors, residential areas and cultural offers.

== Gallery ==
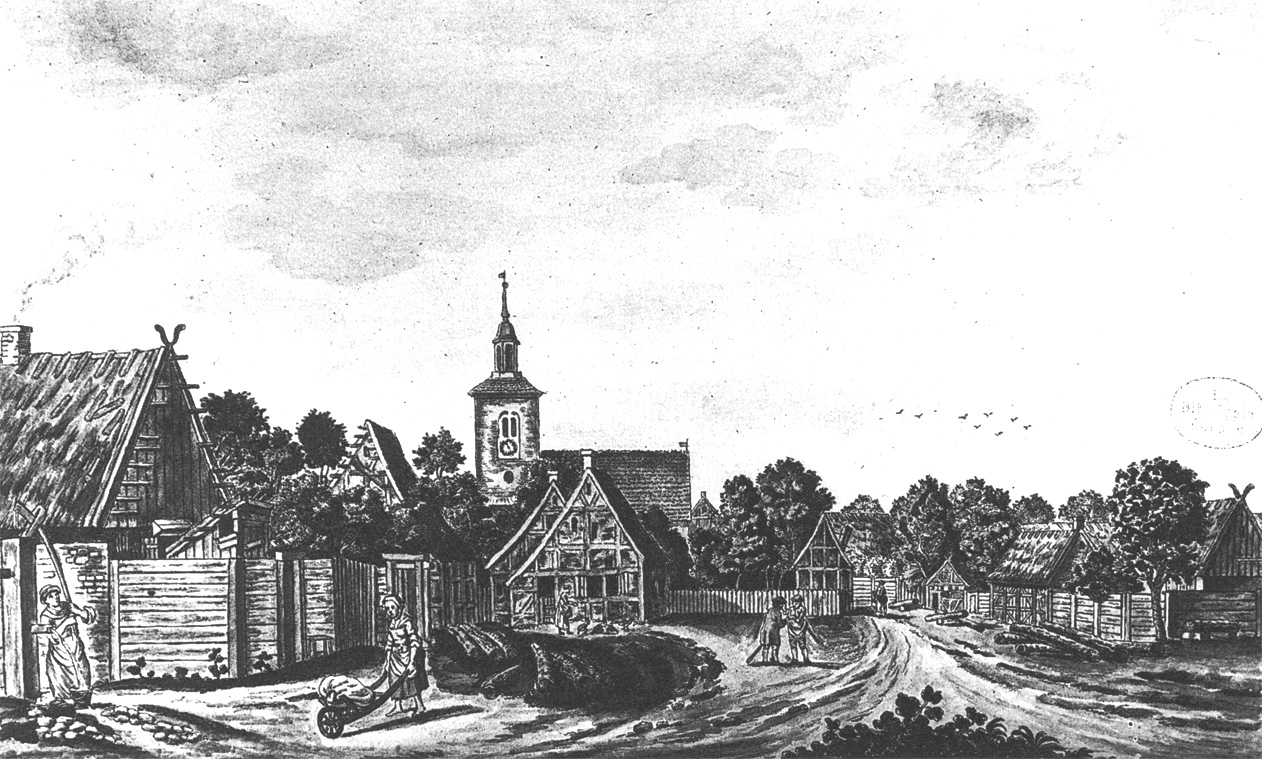
The kernel of Lichtenberg Village, about 1800

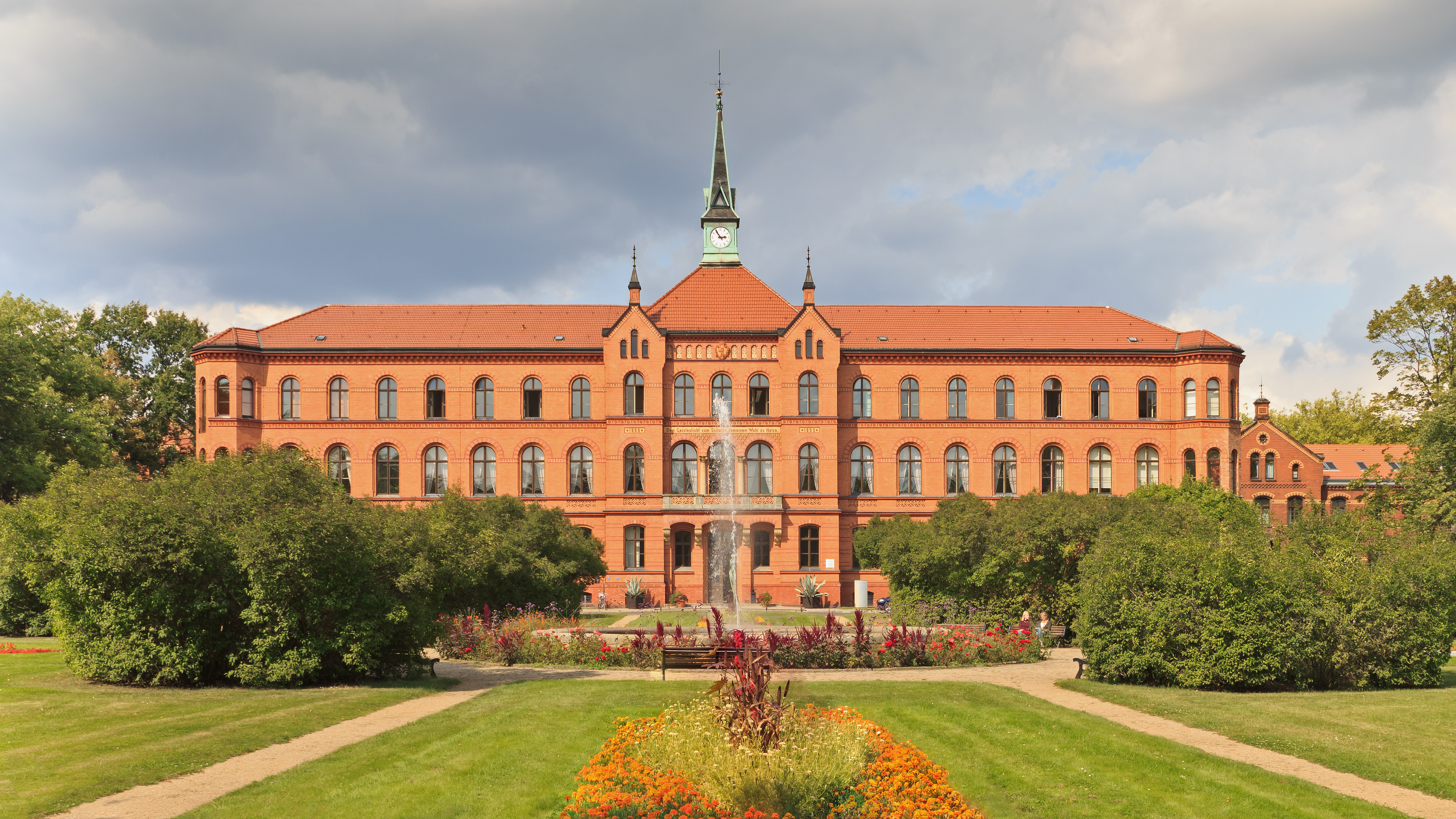
Queen Elizabeth Herzberge Hospital in Lichtenberg

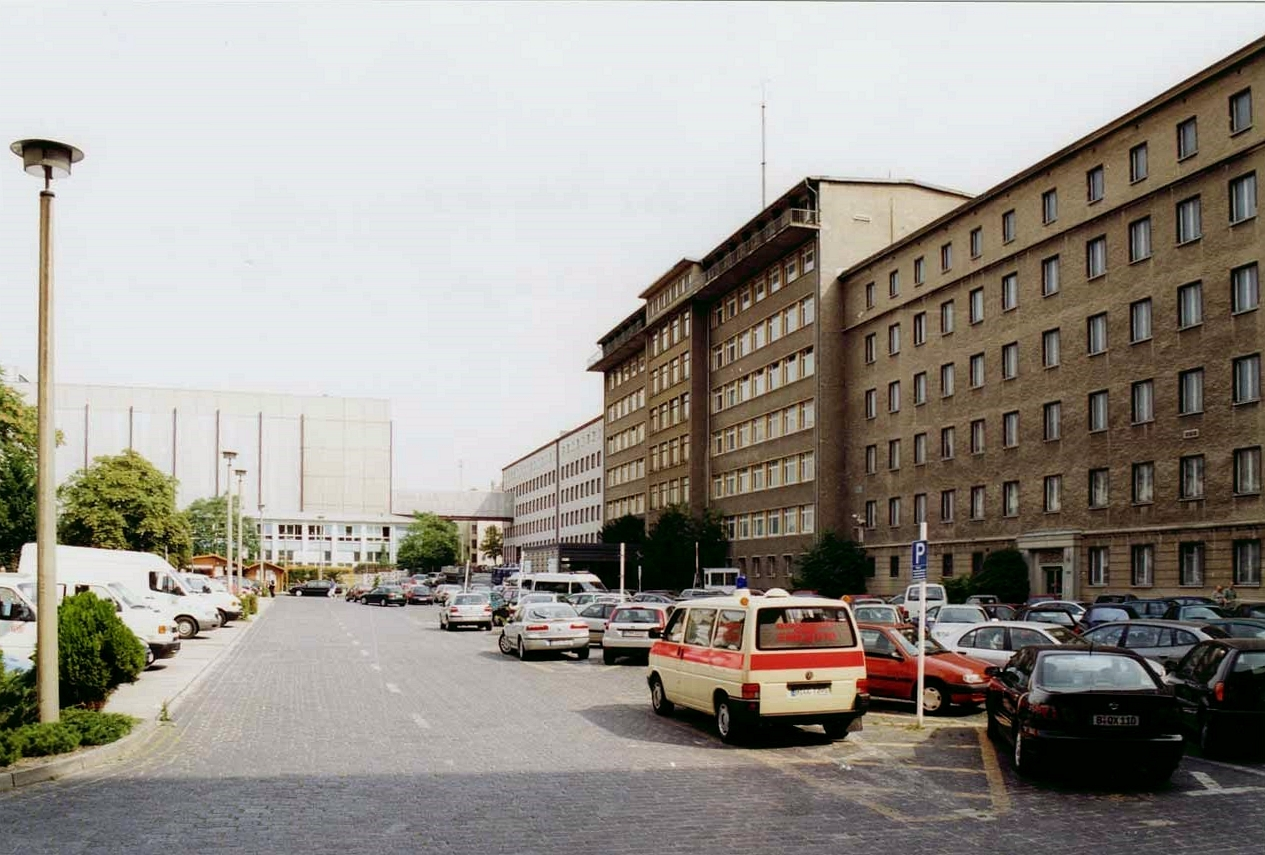
View from south to north to the Normannenstraße, at right the former Stasi building near Ruschestraße

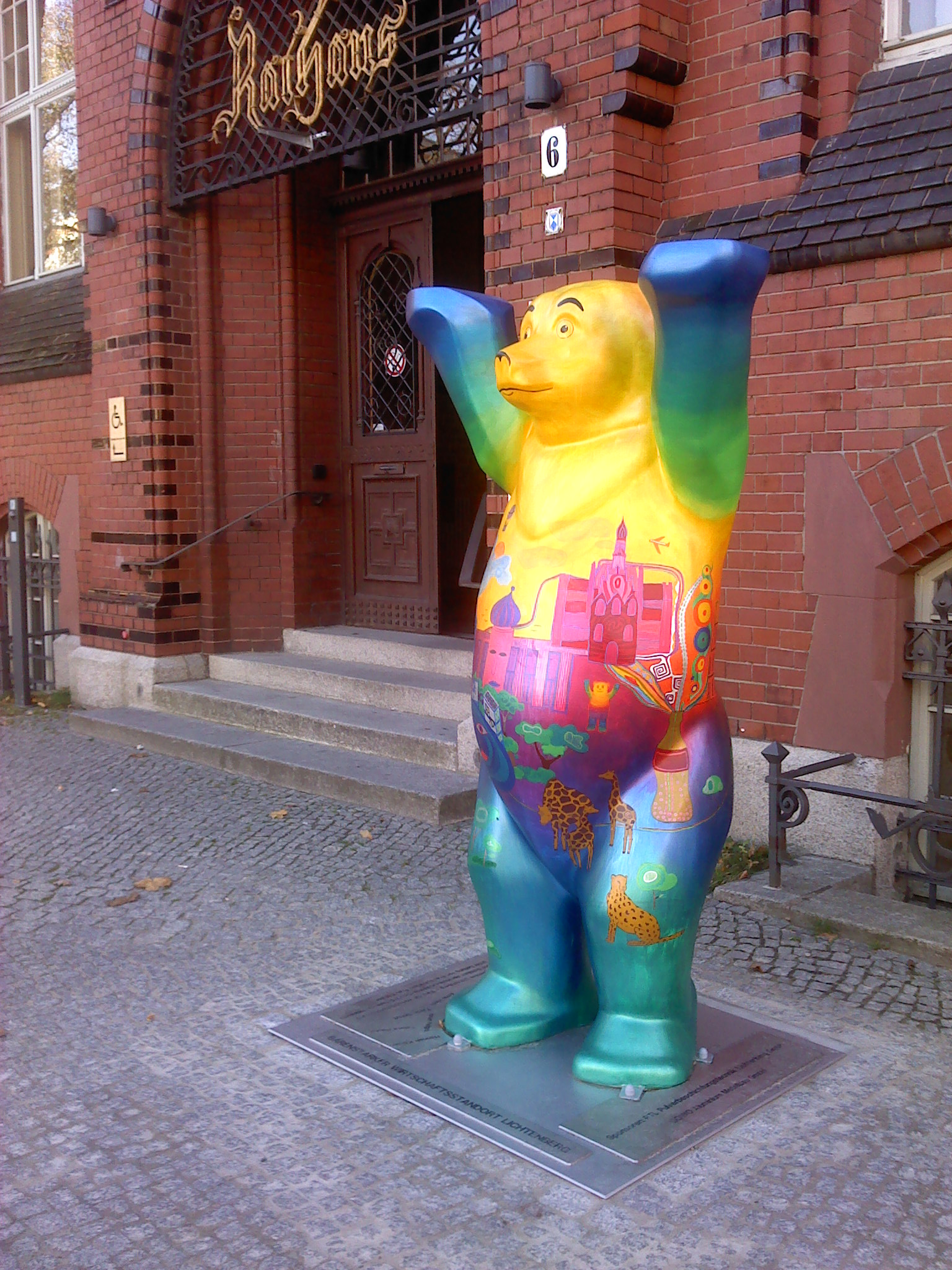
Buddy Bear in front of the town hall

== See also ==
- Berlin-Lichtenberg (electoral district)
- Berlin-Lichtenberg railway station
