= Rummelsburg =

- Quarter of Berlin
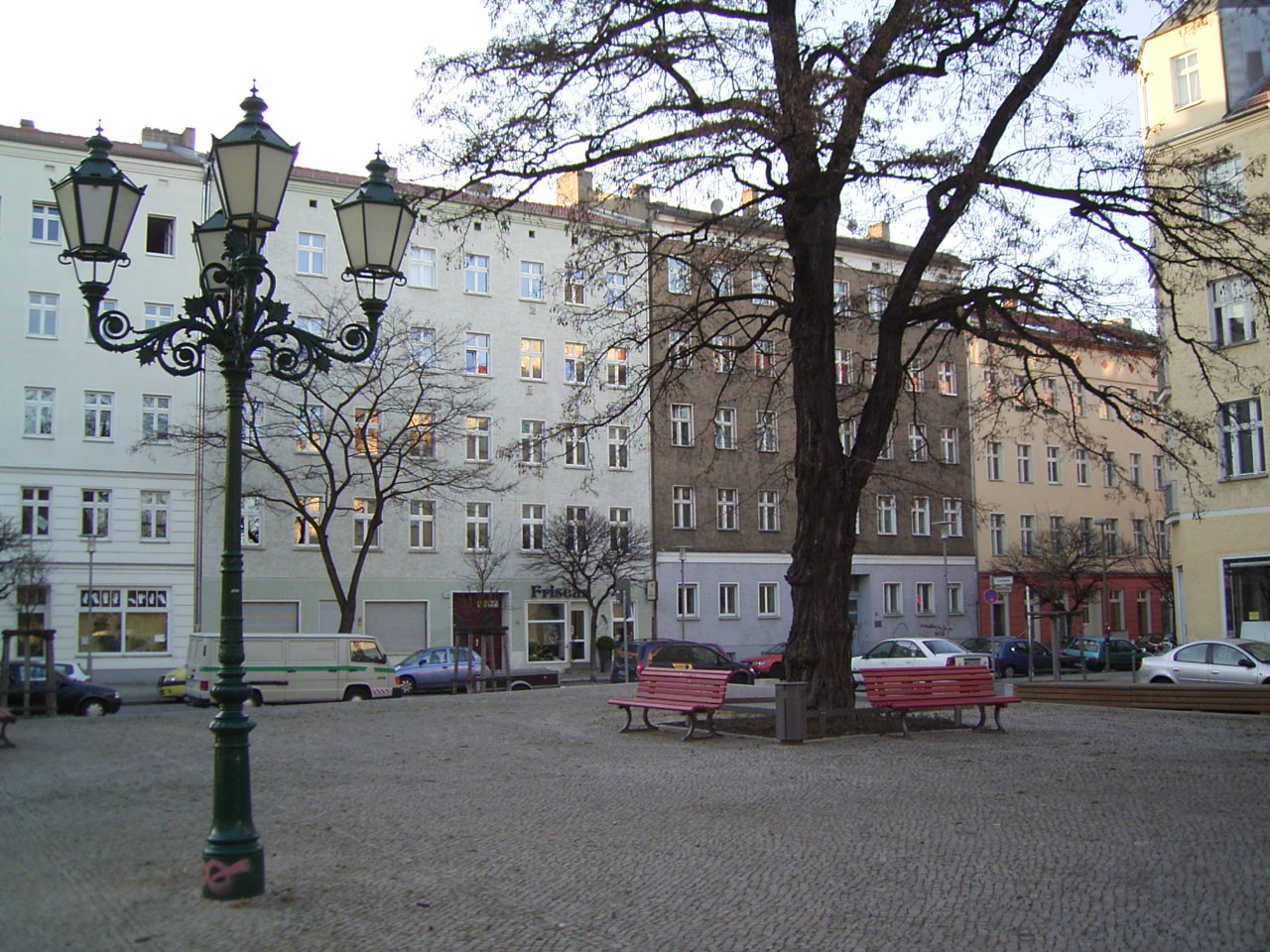
- Tuchollaplatz (Victoriastadt)

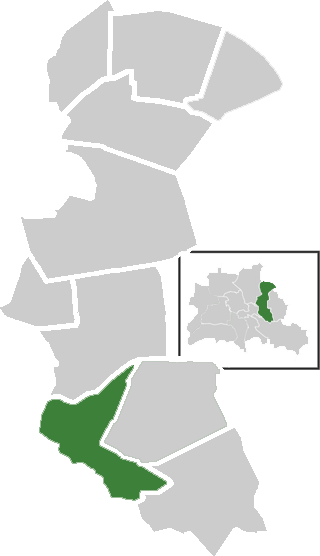
- Location of Rummelsburg in Lichtenberg district and Berlin
- Interactive map of Rummelsburg
- Location within Germany Location within Berlin
- Coordinates: 52°30′00″N 13°29′33″E
- Country: Germany
- State: Berlin
- City: Berlin
- Borough: Lichtenberg, Berlin
- Founded: 1669
- Subdivisions: 1 zone

Area
  - Total: 4.52 km^{2} (1.75 sq mi)
- Elevation: 50 m (160 ft)

Population (2024-12-31)
  - Total: 27,577
  - Density: 6,100/km^{2} (15,800/sq mi)
- Time zone: UTC+01:00 (CET)
  - Summer (DST): UTC+02:00 (CEST)
- Postal codes: 10317
- Vehicle registration: B

Rummelsburg (German: [ˈʁʊml̩sˌbʊʁk]) is a subdivision or neighborhood (Ortsteil) of the borough (Bezirk) of Lichtenberg of the German capital, Berlin.

== History ==
Rummelsburg was founded in 1669. On 30 January 1889 it became a rural municipality, with the name of Boxhagen-Rummelsburg. Merged in 1912 in the town of Lichtenberg, in 1920 it was incorporated in Berlin with the Greater Berlin Act.

== Geography ==
=== Overview ===
Located in the eastern side of the city and crossed by Spree river in the western corner, Rummelsburg borders with Lichtenberg, Friedrichsfelde, Karlshorst, Friedrichshain (in Friedrichshain-Kreuzberg district), Plänterwald and Oberschöneweide (both in Treptow-Köpenick district). The lake Rummelsburger See belongs to the locality and separates it from Stralau, a zone of Friedrichshain.

=== Subdivision ===
Rummelsburg counts 1 zone (Ortslage):

- Victoriastadt

== Transport ==
The locality is served by several urban rail lines of S-Bahn and U-Bahn. The stations serving the locality are Rummelsburg (S3 line), Betriebsbahnhof Rummelsburg (S3), Nöldnerplatz (S5, S7, S75), partly Ostkreuz (S3, S4, S5, S7, S75, S8, S85, S9) and part of the DB station of Lichtenberg (S5, S7, S75, U5, Tram).

== Personalities ==
- Adolph Schlicht (1840–1910)
- Heinrich Zille (1858–1929)
- Margarete Steffin (1908–1941)

== Photogallery ==
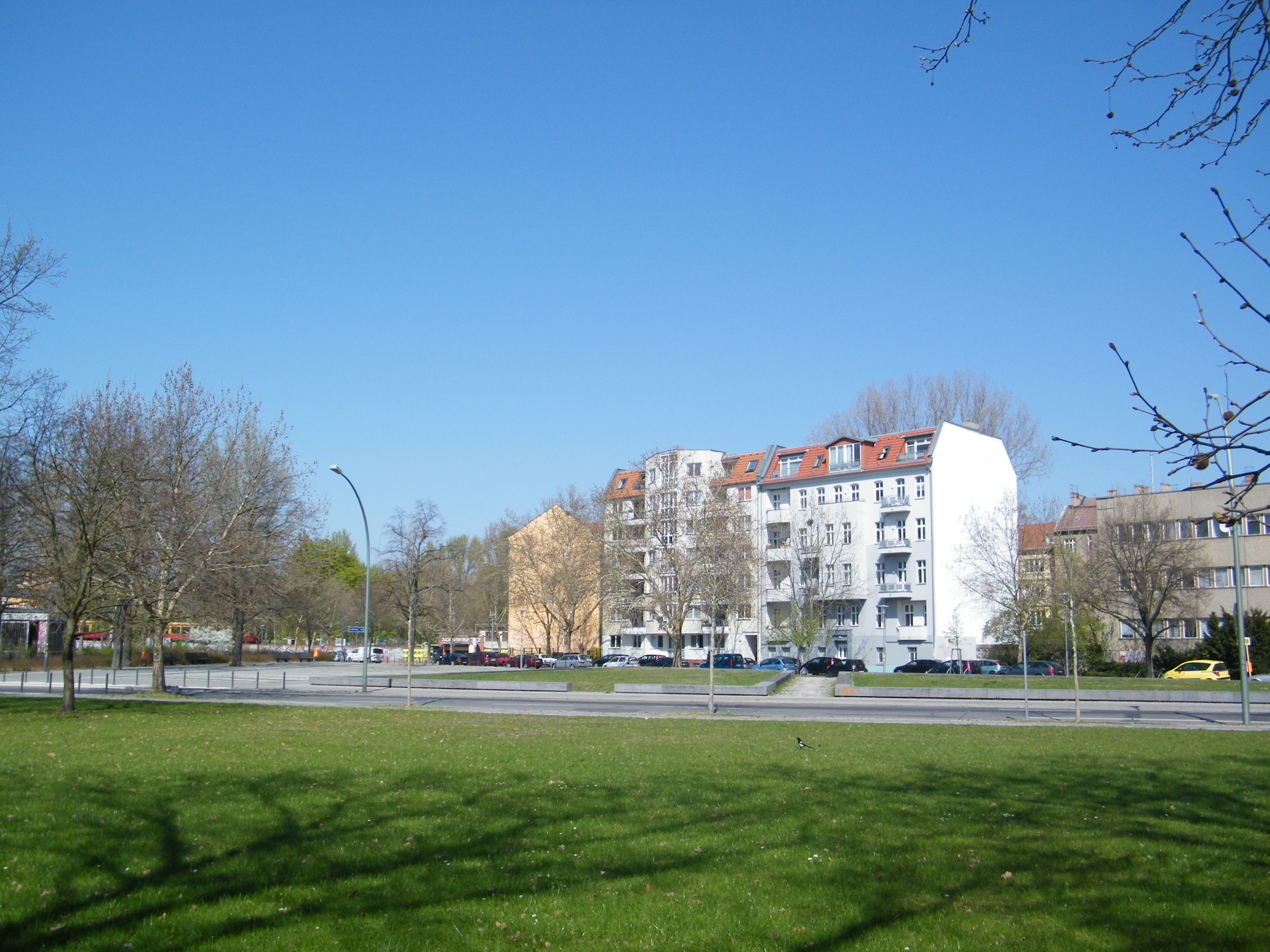
Nöldnerplatz

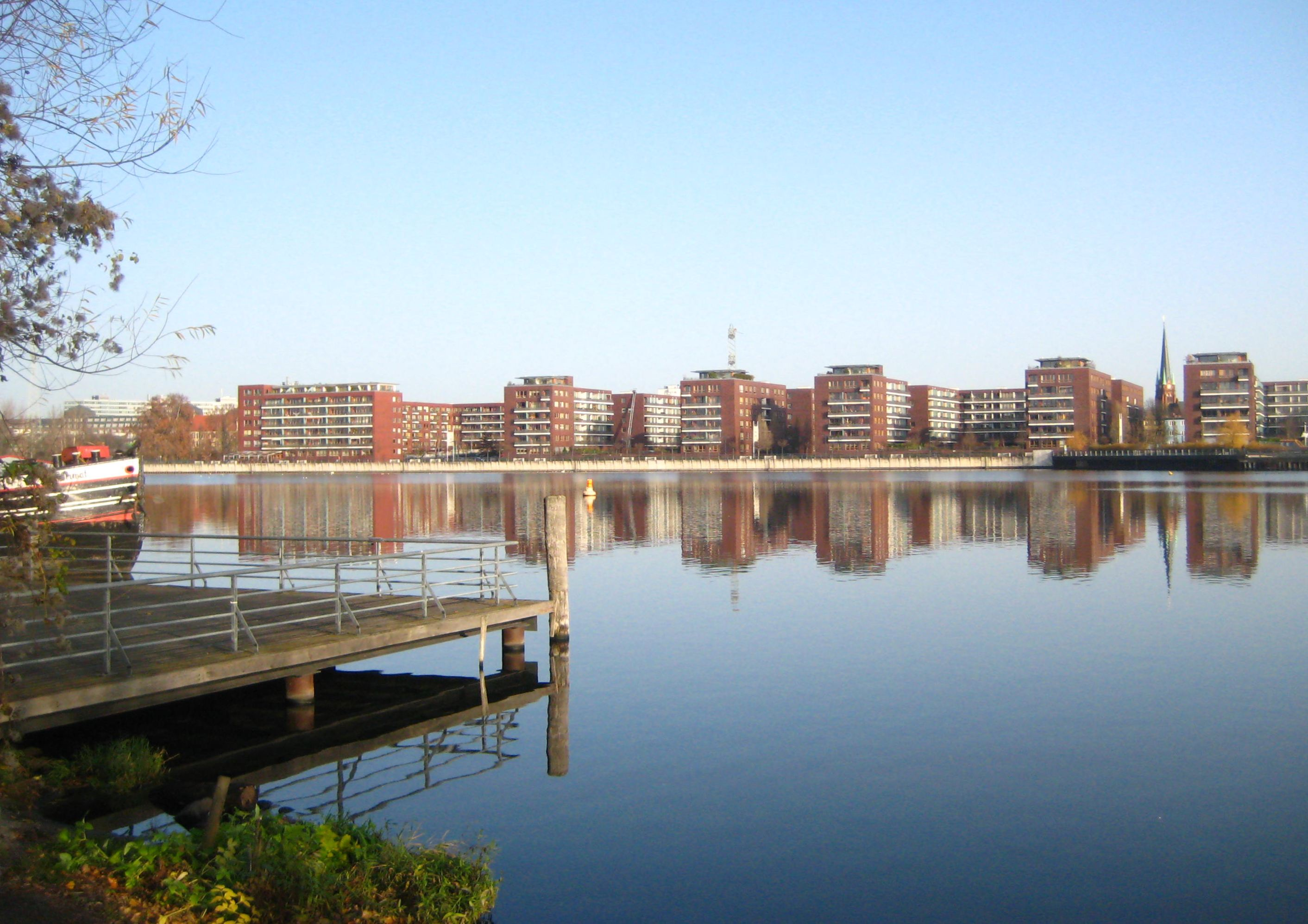
The Rummelsburger See

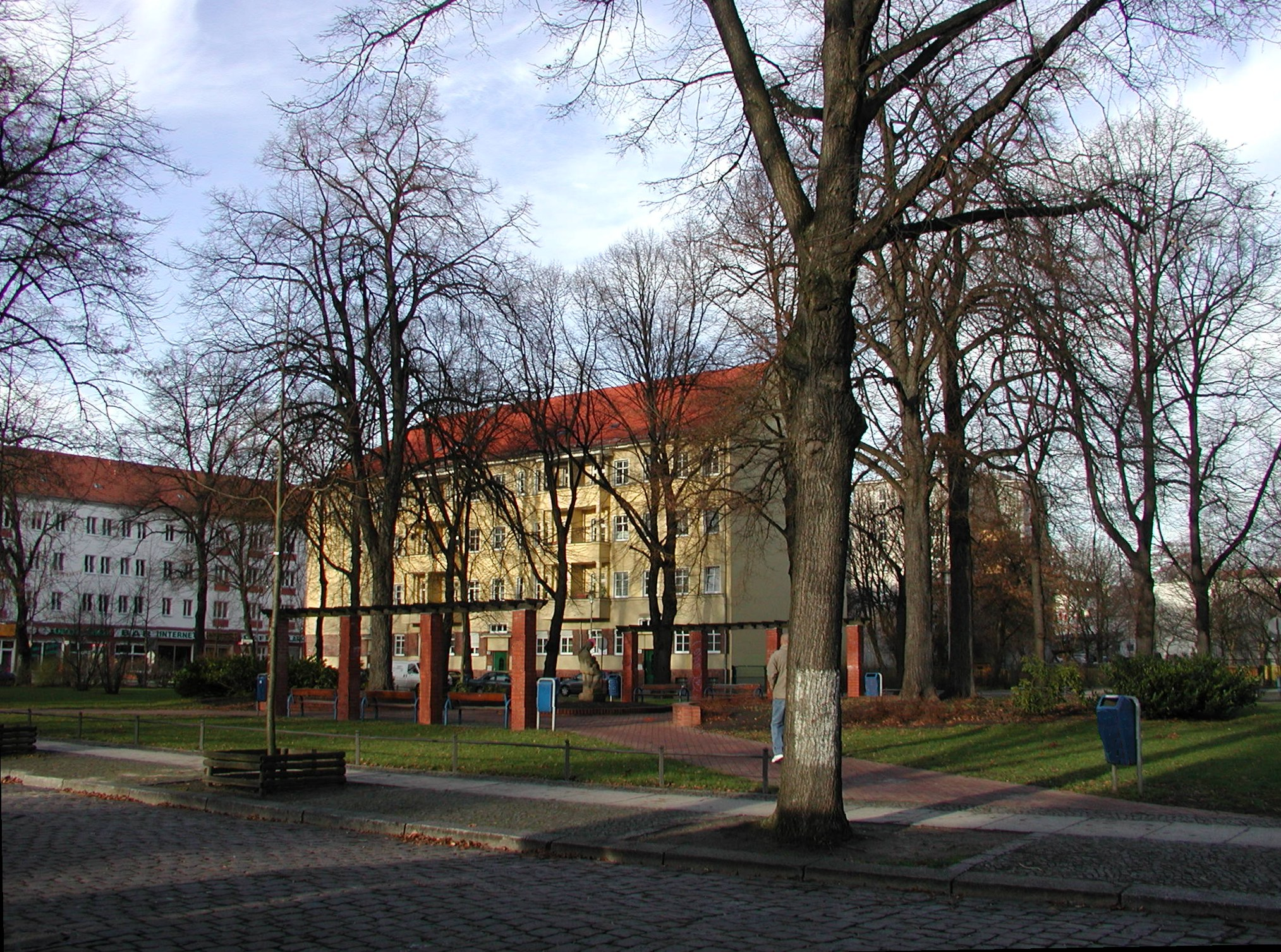
Münsterlandplatz

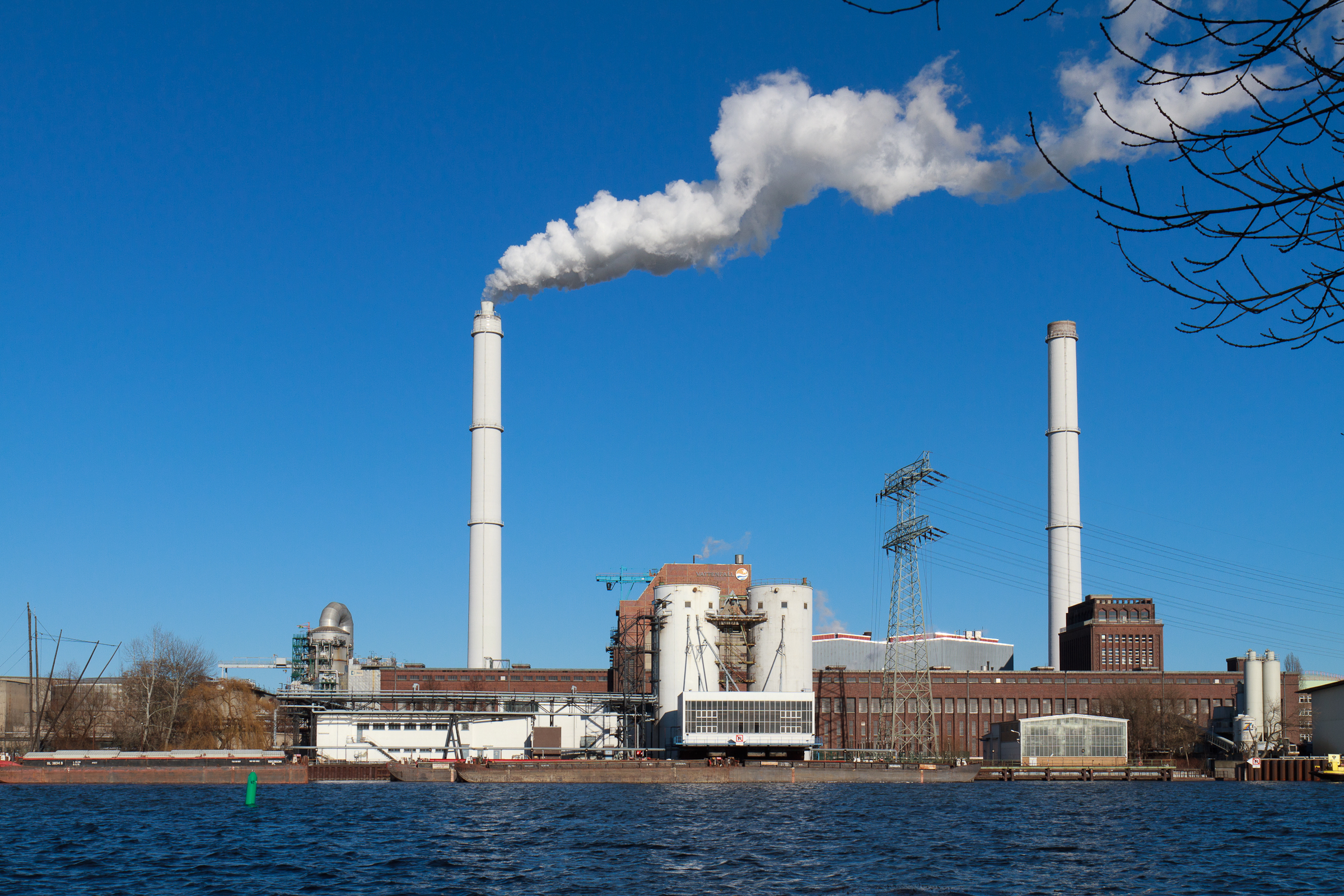
Klingenberg power station
