= Christian Friedrich Scharnweber =

Prussian officer (1770–1822)

Christian Friedrich Scharnweber, born 10 February 1770 in Weende and died 3 July 1822 in Kloster Eberbach, was a Prussian officer. He was the state councillor of Alt-Hohenschönhausen from 1817 onwards, and had considerable influence over Karl August von Hardenberg.
