= Hohenschönhausen Castle =

Coordinates: 52°32′57″N 13°30′21″E

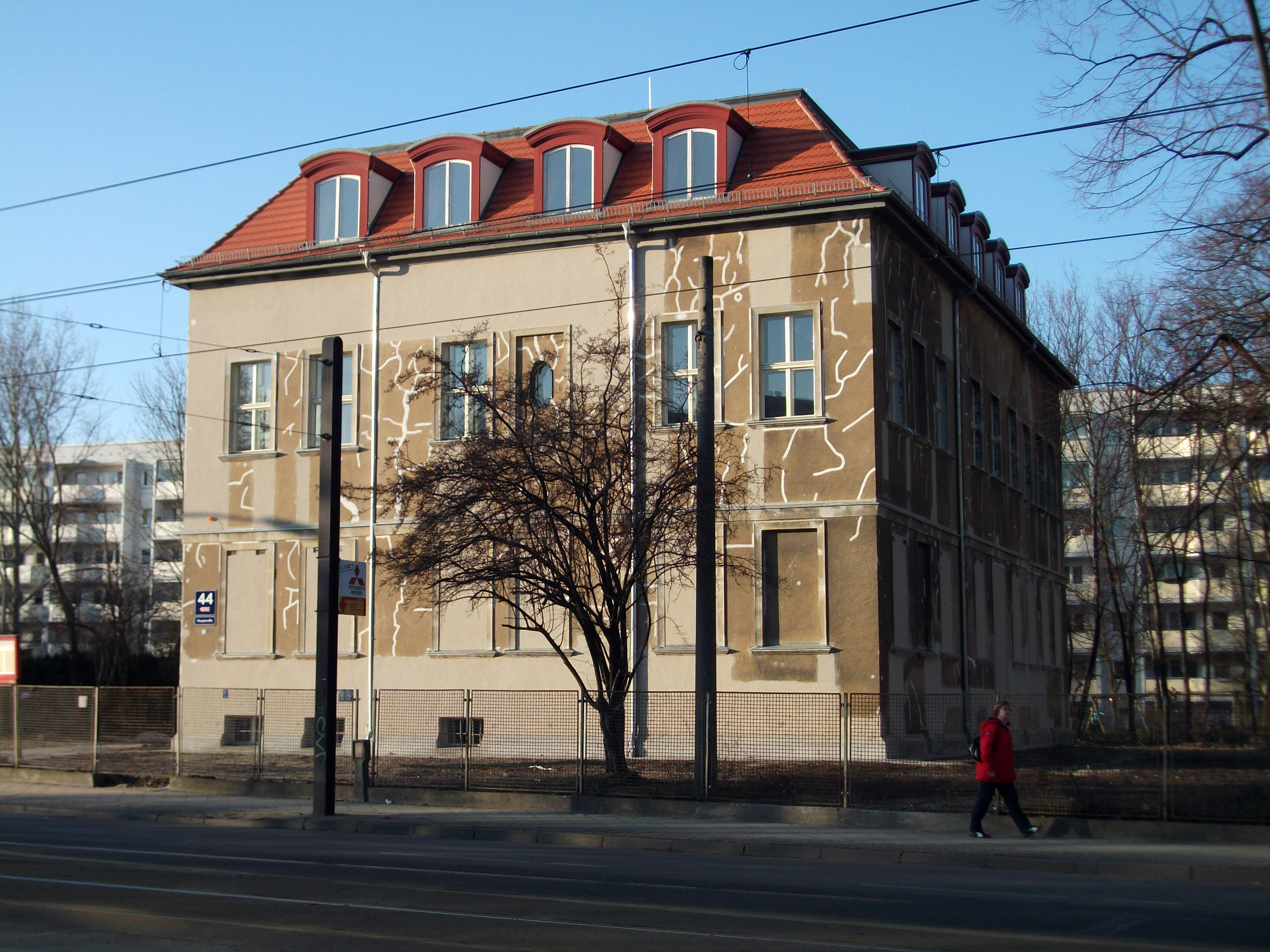
Hohenschönhausen Castle in May 2010

Hohenschönhausen Castle, Berlin

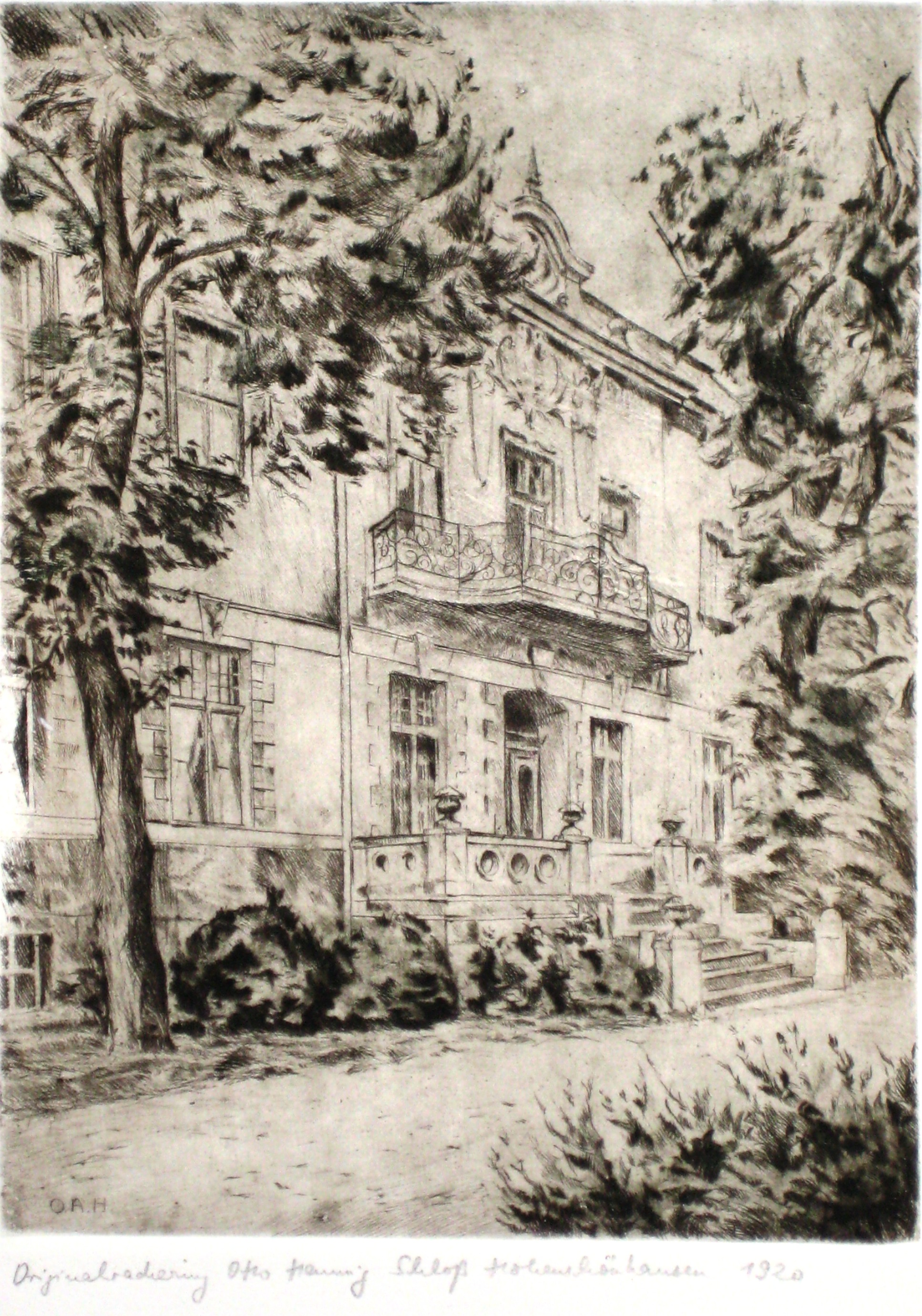
Hohenschönhausen Castle, etching by Otto Hennig (1920)

Hohenschönhausen Castle (German: Schloss Hohenschönhausen or Bürgerschloss Hohenschönhausen) is a manor house in the borough Alt-Hohenschönhausen in Berlin, Germany. It is owned by the Association Hohenschönhausen Castle and listed in the heritage registers of Berlin.

== History ==
=== 13th to 20th century ===
The first buildings in today's castle area were erected between the 13th and 15th century and inhabited by a Schultheiss family. At the end of the 15th century the noble family von Röbel built a manor house in the area, which was bought by the merchant Adam Ebersbach on July 2, 1736. In 1817 it was bought by the Prussian Friedrich Scharnweber, a close employee of Karl August Fürst von Hardenberg, in 1890 it was sold to the banker Henry Suermondt and parceled out. In 1893 the manor house and its area were bought by the merchant Gerhard Puchmüller, who changed the structure of the building. Moreover, the vestibule was decorated with paintings during that time. From 1910 to 1929 the German entrepreneur and inventor Paul Schmidt was the last private owner of the castle. In 1930 the manor house became the property of the city and was first used by social institutions. From 1945 to 1989 a maternity hospital was housed in it. In 1993/94 the city wanted to open a local museum in the castle, but the plan failed due to financial difficulties.

=== 21st century: Cultural use ===
In 1998 the Association Hohenschönhausen Castle was founded, which bought the whole area in February 2008 and since then cares for the restoration and cultural revitalization of the manor house. The Association regularly organizes different events in the castle, such as exhibitions, readings, and concerts. Among the known personalities who give performances at Hohenschönhausen Castle are, inter alia, the former figure skating world champion Christine Errath and the Austrian classical guitarist Johanna Beisteiner, who is also an Honorary member of the Association Hohenschönhausen Castle.

== Literature ==
- Ruben, Bärbel: Manor house Hohenschönhausen – An endless story of a castle / Das Gutshaus Hohenschönhausen – Eine unendliche Schloßgeschichte (German). Decent Editions. Blumberg, 1998. ISBN 3-9806204-2-5.
- Meyerhöfer, Rolf: Hohenschönhausen Castle in the eyes of the local press / Das Schloss Hohenschönhausen im Spiegel der Lokalzeitungen (German). Hohenschönhausener Kalenderblätter, No. 9, (2nd edition). Berlin, September 2001.
