= Victor Aronstein =

German doctor

Victor Aronstein (1 November 1896 – 13 January 1945) was a German-Jewish medical doctor whose practice in Alt-Hohenschönhausen, Berlin served as a meeting place for communists and social democrats during the rule of the Nazi Party. He was deported to the Łódź Ghetto in 1941 and then moved to Auschwitz, where he was murdered in 1945.

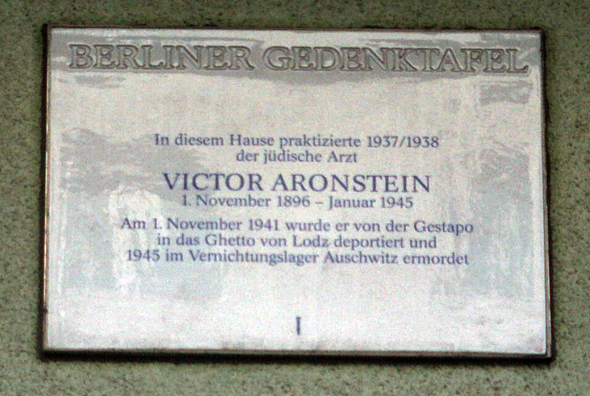
Aronstein's practice, which also served as a meeting place for communists and social democrats during the Nazi period.
