= Berlin Nöldnerplatz station =

Railway station in Berlin, Germany

Coordinates: 52.5038°N 13.4853°E

Nöldnerplatz
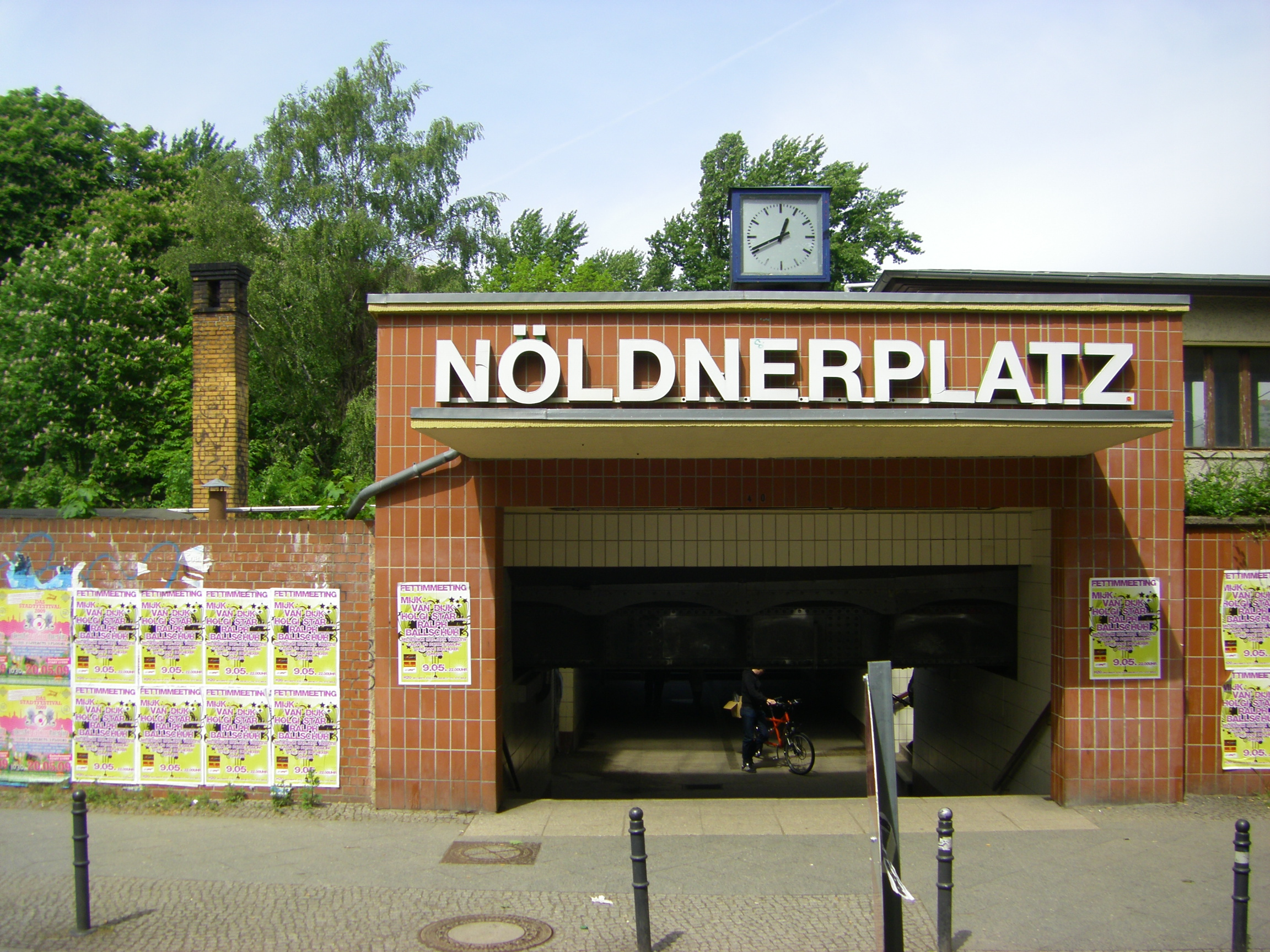

General information
- Location: Lichtenberg, Berlin, Berlin; Germany
- Platforms: 1 island platform
- Tracks: 2
- Connections: S5 S7 S75

Construction
- Accessible: no

Other information
- Station code: 4566
- DS100 code: BNPL
- IBNR: 10036
- Category: 4
- Fare zone: : Berlin B/5656
- Website: www.bahnhof.de

Services
Preceding station	Berlin S-Bahn	Following station
Ostkreuz towards Westkreuz	S5	Lichtenberg towards Strausberg Nord
Ostkreuz towards Potsdam Hbf	S7	Lichtenberg towards Ahrensfelde
Ostkreuz towards Warschauer Straße	S75	Lichtenberg towards Wartenberg
Location

Berlin Nöldnerplatz is a railway station in the Rummelsburg quarter of the Lichtenberg borough in Berlin. It is served by the S-Bahn lines S5, S7 and S75. The station is located on the eponymous square named after the Communist and resistance fighter Erwin Nöldner, killed in 1944, who lived nearby.
